= Endemic fauna of Uzbekistan =

Animal species unique to Uzbekistan

This is a list of the endemic fauna of Uzbekistan. It includes animal species currently reported only from Uzbekistan in major taxonomic databases and scientific publications. Some near-endemic species, whose ranges lie almost entirely within Uzbekistan, are also included. The list may change as taxonomic revisions are made and new distribution records become available.

Endemic animals of Uzbekistan
From the top clockwise: gecko Alsophylax emilia, tree trunk spider Hersiliola esyunini, stone loach Triplophysa ferganaensis, butterfly Melitaea acraeina, spider Palpimanus rakhimovi, gecko Teratoscincus rustamowi, wolf spider Zyuzicosa andreii, scorpion Mesobuthus zonsteini, gecko Alsophylax ferganensis, ant Alloformica flavicornis.

== Context ==
=== Regional endemism ===
Uzbekistan is located in Central Asia, a region that includes several areas of high biodiversity. Parts of Uzbekistan fall within the Mountains of Central Asia biodiversity hotspot, as defined by the Critical Ecosystem Partnership Fund. According to the World Wildlife Fund ecoregion classification, Uzbekistan has no ecoregions found exclusively within its borders and shares all six of its ecoregions with neighbouring countries. These include the Alai–Western Tian Shan steppe, Gissaro–Alai open woodlands, Badghyz and Karabil semi-desert, Central Asian northern desert, Central Asian southern desert, and Central Asian riparian woodlands. (Note: One Earth uses WWF ecoregions as the underlying ecological units for its bioregional classification system.) As a result, much of Uzbekistan's biodiversity is shared across national borders with neighbouring Central Asian countries, including Kazakhstan, Kyrgyzstan, Tajikistan, and Turkmenistan. Many species occurring in Uzbekistan are also expected to occur elsewhere in the region.

Central Asia has a high rate of endemism. For example, among different insect orders, the rate of endemism ranges from 10% to 50–60% of all recognised species. Among millipedes, 90% of species are endemic to Central Asia. At the same time, because biodiversity is shared among several countries, the number of species restricted to the territory of any single Central Asian state, including Uzbekistan, is comparatively limited.

=== Endemism in Uzbekistan ===
There is no officially recognised checklist of the endemic fauna of Uzbekistan. However, an unofficial preliminary checklist was compiled by conservationist and Minnesota Zoo staff member Fred Swengel as part of his global project Living National Treasures, which compiles data from scientific taxonomic databases (HBW/BirdLife Taxonomic Checklist, AviList, The Reptile Database, AmphibiaWeb, Catalog of Fishes, Lepidoptera Mundi, Catalogue of Life, and others) to identify endemic species for each country in the world.

The region with the highest number of endemic species records in Uzbekistan is the Fergana Valley. It is also the most densely populated region of the country and has been heavily transformed by agriculture. Many endemic species were described from this area in the 1930s and 1940s and have not been observed since. Some, such as the moth Zygaena ferganae, are considered extinct. At the same time, new species continue to be discovered in the valley, including vertebrates. In 2023 two new species of lizards were described: the Fergana even-fingered gecko (Alsophylax ferganensis) and Emilia's even-fingered gecko (Alsophylax emilia). Between 2021 and 2024, three new species of fish were also described from the valley: the Fergana stone loach (Triplophysa ferganaensis), the Sokh stone loach (Triplophysa daryoae), and the Uzbekistan stone loach (Dzihunia pseudoamudarjensis).

Large-scale environmental transformation during the Soviet period also affected species distributions within Uzbekistan. Beginning in the 1930s, extensive areas of arid and semi-arid land were irrigated and converted to agriculture, especially for cotton cultivation, through projects such as the Great Fergana Canal and the Virgin Lands campaign. These changes caused the loss and fragmentation of natural habitats. Some species declined or disappeared, while others persisted in modified environments. One example is the butterfly Melitaea acraeina, described in 1886 from the Fergana Valley. It was not recorded again for many decades and was considered possibly extinct until its rediscovery in 1989 by Alexander Kreuzberg. Subsequent observations showed that the species survives in secondary habitats within agricultural landscapes, such as drainage canal slopes. For some species, inclusion in this list may reflect that their remaining known populations are currently confined to Uzbekistan.

The biodiversity of Central Asia, including Uzbekistan, remains poorly studied. Faunistic and taxonomic research on the invertebrates of Uzbekistan has been especially limited. Much scientific effort historically focused on applied topics such as crop pest management and economically important species. Many invertebrate species are known only from their original descriptions. Technically, such species may be treated as endemic in the literature, but this status may just reflect a lack of research and sampling rather than true geographic restriction. Inclusion in this list indicates that a species has so far been reported only from Uzbekistan in available sources; it does not necessarily imply strict endemism. Future research may document these species in neighbouring regions with similar environmental and climatic conditions.

Only species recognised by the Catalogue of Life are included in this list. Only taxa recognised at species rank are included; endemic subspecies are excluded.

There are no known endemic species of mammals, birds, or amphibians in Uzbekistan. As of May 2026, the list includes 4 reptiles, 4 fish, 30 insects (including 3 butterflies and moths, 12 beetles, 4 ants, 5 bees, 2 wasps, 2 flies, 1 grasshopper, 1 webspinner), 27 arachnids (including 21 spiders, 4 scorpions, 2 harvestmen), 2 myriapods, 1 crustacean, 2 mollusks, and 5 earthworms. The total is 75 species. The list is not complete.

== List ==
Endemic fauna of Uzbekistan
#	Common name	Picture	Scientific name	Distribution range / Note	Red Data Book of Uzbekistan status	IUCN Red List status (clickable)	Catalogue of Life species profile (clickable)	Wikispecies profile (clickable)	iNaturalist species profile (clickable)
Reptilia (reptiles)
1	Fergana even-fingered gecko		Alsophylax ferganensis	IUCN: 100% range within Uzbekistan. Fergana Valley	-	Critically Endangered	CoL	Wikispecies	iNaturalist
2	Emilia's even-fingered gecko		Alsophylax emilia	Fergana Valley	-	-	CoL	Wikispecies	iNaturalist
3	Rustamov's plate-tailed gecko		Teratoscincus rustamowi	Near-endemic. IUCN range: Tajikistan and Uzbekistan, with over 90% of its range within Uzbekistan. Fergana Valley.	1 (EN) Endangered	Endangered	CoL	Wikispecies	iNaturalist
4	Reticulated toad-headed agama		Phrynocephalus reticulatus	Near-endemic. IUCN range: Turkmenistan and Uzbekistan, with over 90% of its range within Uzbekistan. Kyzylkum Desert.	-	Endangered	CoL	Wikispecies	iNaturalist
Actinopterygii (ray-finned fishes)
5	Fergana stone loach		Triplophysa ferganaensis	Near-endemic.Tajikistan and Uzbekistan, with over 90% of its range within Uzbekistan. Fergana Valley.	-	-	CoL	Wikispecies	iNaturalist
6	Sokh stone loach		Triplophysa daryoae	Fergana Valley	-	-	CoL	-	iNaturalist
7	Uzbekistan stone loach		Dzihunia pseudoamudarjensis	Fergana Valley	-	-	CoL	-	iNaturalist
8	Stone loach Dzihunia ilan		Dzihunia ilan	Near-endemic. IUCN range: Tajikistan and Uzbekistan, with over 90% of its range within Uzbekistan. Zeravshan River.	-	Least Concern	CoL	-	iNaturalist
Insecta (insects)
Orthoptera (grasshoppers, locusts, and crickets)
9	Grasshopper Conophyma turkestanicum		Conophyma turkestanicum	Turkestan Mountain Range	-	-	CoL	-	iNaturalist
Embioptera (webspinners)
10	Webspinner Uranembia rivkusi		Uranembia rivkusi	Kyzylkum Desert, Navoiy Region, Qashqadaryo Region	-	-	CoL	Wikispecies	iNaturalist
Coleoptera (beetles)
11	Longhorn beetle Neoplocaederus danilevskyi		Neoplocaederus danilevskyi	Surxondaryo Region	-	-	CoL	Wikispecies	iNaturalist
12	Click beetle Reitterelater kovalenkoi		Reitterelater kovalenkoi	Nuratau Mountains	-	-	CoL	-	-
13	Fergana earth-boring dung beetle Lethrus bispinus		Lethrus bispinus	Fergana Valley	1 (CR) Critically Endangered	-	CoL	Wikispecies	-
14	Darkling beetle Colposcelis khudaybergani		Colposcelis khudaybergani	Karakalpakstan	-	-	CoL	-	-
15	Darkling beetle Colposcelis ustyurtensis		Colposcelis ustyurtensis	Karakalpakstan	-	-	CoL	-	-
16	Darkling beetle Trigonoscelis ceromatica		Trigonoscelis ceromatica	Surxondaryo Region	-	-	CoL	-	iNaturalist
17	Jewel beetle Acmaeoderella zeravshanica		Acmaeoderella zeravshanica	Zeravshan Mountain Range	-	-	CoL	-	iNaturalist
18	Jewel beetle Acmaeoderella nigrentis		Acmaeoderella nigrentis	Samarkand Region	-	-	CoL	-	-
19	Jewel beetle Sphenoptera varia		Sphenoptera varia	Uzbekistan	-	-	CoL	-	-
20	Jewel beetle Sphenoptera caesia		Sphenoptera caesia	Uzbekistan	-	-	CoL	-	-
21	Jewel beetle Sphenoptera korshinskii		Sphenoptera korshinskii	Uzbekistan	-	-	CoL	-	-
22	Rove beetle Lesteva somsa		Lesteva somsa	Chatkal Mountain Range	-	-	CoL	-	-
23	Weevil Gymnetron propinquum		Gymnetron propinquum	Kughitangtau Mountain Range	-	-	CoL	-	-
Lepidoptera (butterflies and moths)
24	Nymphalid butterfly Melitaea acraeina		Melitaea acraeina	Fergana Valley	1 (CR) Critically Endangered	-	CoL	-	iNaturalist
25	Fergana smoky moth Zygaena ferganae		Zygaena ferganae	Fergana Valley	0 (EX) Extinct	-	CoL	Wikispecies	iNaturalist
26	Cossid moth Cossulus nikiforoviorum		Cossulus nikiforoviorum	Hisar Mountain Range	-	-	CoL	Wikispecies	iNaturalist
Hymenoptera (wasps, bees, ants, and sawflies)
27	Ant Leptanilla alexandri		Leptanilla alexandri	Qashqadaryo Region	-	-	CoL	-	iNaturalist
28	Ant Alloformica flavicornis		Alloformica flavicornis	Mountains of Tashkent Region. probably Kazakhstan	-	-	CoL	Wikispecies	-
29	Ant Stenamma sogdianum		Stenamma sogdianum	Zeravshan Mountain Range	-	-	CoL	-	iNaturalist
30	Ant Proformica similis		Proformica similis	Qashqadaryo Region	-	-	CoL	-	iNaturalist
31	Bee Colletes uzbekus		Colletes uzbekus	Qurama Mountains	-	-	CoL	-	-
32	Bee Andrena ahenea		Andrena ahenea	Samarkand Region	-	-	CoL	Wikispecies	iNaturalist
33	Bee Andrena lucidicollis		Andrena lucidicollis	Tashkent region	-	-	CoL	Wikispecies	iNaturalist
34	Bee Andrena sordidella		Andrena sordidella	Tashkent region	-	-	CoL	Wikispecies	iNaturalist
35	Bee Andrena subaenescens		Andrena subaenescens	Samarkand Region	-	-	CoL	Wikispecies	iNaturalist
36	Wasp Dinetus rakhimovi		Dinetus rakhimovi	Qashqadaryo Region	-	-	CoL	-	-
37	Wasp Eumenes selisi		Eumenes selisi	Uzbekistan	-	-	CoL	-	-
Diptera (flies and mosquitoes)
38	Hover fly Eumerus ryzhik		Eumerus ryzhik	Surxondaryo Region	-	-	CoL	-	-
39	Hover fly Eumerus ferulae		Eumerus ferulae	Kyzylkum Desert	1 (EN) Endangered	-	CoL	-	-
Arachnida (arachnids)
Araneae (spiders)
40	Palp-footed spider Palpimanus rakhimovi		Palpimanus rakhimovi	Surxondaryo Region	-	-	CoL	Wikispecies	iNaturalist
41	Palp-footed spider Palpimanus wagneri		Palpimanus wagneri	Uzbekistan	-	-	CoL	-	iNaturalist
42	Tree trunk spider Hersiliola esyunini		Hersiliola esyunini	Fergana Valley	-	-	CoL	Wikispecies	iNaturalist
43	Crevice weaver spider Zaitunia minuta		Zaitunia minuta	Qurama Mountains, Fergana Valley	-	-	CoL	-	iNaturalist
44	Jumping spider Pseudomogrus tamdybulak		Pseudomogrus tamdybulak	Kyzylkum Desert, Navoi Region	-	-	CoL	-	iNaturalist
45	Jumping spider Pseudomogrus nurataus		Pseudomogrus nurataus	Nuratau Mountains	-	-	CoL	-	iNaturalist
46	Wolf spider Zyuzicosa andreii		Zyuzicosa andreii	Surxondaryo Region	-	-	CoL	Wikispecies	iNaturalist
47	Wolf spider Zyuzicosa gigantea		Zyuzicosa gigantea	Surxondaryo Region	-	-	CoL	Wikispecies	iNaturalist
48	Wolf spider Zyuzicosa baisunica		Zyuzicosa baisunica	Surxondaryo Region	-	-	CoL	Wikispecies	iNaturalist
49	Wolf spider Zyuzicosa fulviventris		Zyuzicosa fulviventris	Zeravshan Mountain Range	-	-	CoL	Wikispecies	iNaturalist
50	Wolf spider Zyuzicosa uzbekistanica		Zyuzicosa uzbekistanica	Surxondaryo Region	-	-	CoL	Wikispecies	iNaturalist
51	Wolf spider Karakumosa gromovi		Karakumosa gromovi	Surxondaryo Region	-	-	CoL	Wikispecies	iNaturalist
52	Wolf spider Arctosa pardosina		Arctosa pardosina	Uzbekistan	-	-	CoL	-	iNaturalist
53	Tangle-web spider Theridion reinhardti		Theridion reinhardti	Uzbekistan	-	-	CoL	-	iNaturalist
54	Tangle-web spider Theridion turanicum		Theridion turanicum	Uzbekistan	-	-	CoL	-	iNaturalist
55	Spider Cedicoides simoni		Cedicoides simoni	Uzbekistan	-	-	CoL	-	iNaturalist
56	Crab spider Misumenops turanicus		Misumenops turanicus	Uzbekistan	-	-	CoL	-	iNaturalist
57	Sac spider Clubiona maracandica		Clubiona maracandica	Uzbekistan	-	-	CoL	-	iNaturalist
58	Spider Liocranum freibergi		Liocranum freibergi	Uzbekistan	-	-	CoL	-	iNaturalist
59	Ground spider Pterotricha argentosa		Pterotricha argentosa	Uzbekistan	-	-	CoL	-	iNaturalist
60	Funnel weaver spider Gorbiscape zarafshanicus		Gorbiscape zarafshanicus	Zeravshan Mountain Range	-	-	CoL	Wikispecies	iNaturalist
Scorpiones (scorpions)
61	Scorpion Orthochirus feti		Orthochirus feti	Surxondaryo Region	-	-	CoL	Wikispecies	iNaturalist
62	Scorpion Olivierus nenilini		Olivierus nenilini	Qurama Mountains, Fergana Valley, probably Kyrgyzstan	-	-	CoL	-	iNaturalist
63	Scorpion Mesobuthus barszczevskii		Mesobuthus barszczevskii	Surxondaryo Region	-	-	CoL	Wikispecies	iNaturalist
64	Scorpion Mesobuthus zonsteini		Mesobuthus zonsteini	Navoiy Region	-	-	CoL	-	iNaturalist
Opiliones (harvestmen)
65	Harvestman Phalangium gromovi		Phalangium gromovi	Surxondaryo Region	-	-	CoL	-	iNaturalist
66	Harvestman Phalangium kitabense		Phalangium kitabense	Zeravshan Mountain Range	-	-	CoL	-	iNaturalist
Myriapoda (millipedes and centipedes)
67	Millipede Jaxartes zachvatkini		Jaxartes zachvatkini	Tashkent	-	-	CoL	-	-
68	Centipede Taschkentia parthorum		Taschkentia parthorum	Tashkent Region	-	-	CoL	-	-
Crustacea
69	Woodlouse Turanoniscus anacanthotermitis		Turanoniscus anacanthotermitis	The only genus and species in the family Turanoniscidae. Known only from Uzbekistan; inhabits termite nests	-	-	CoL	Wikispecies	iNaturalist
Mollusca (mollusks)
70	Valvatamnicola archangelskii		Valvatamnicola archangelskii	Uzbekistan	1 (CR) Critically Endangered	Data Deficient	CoL	-	iNaturalist
71	Kolhymorbis dildorae		Kolhymorbis dildorae	Uzbekistan	-	Data Deficient	CoL	-	iNaturalist
Annelida (segmented worms)
72	Earthworm Allolobophora taschkentensis		Allolobophora taschkentensis	Khumsan, Karjantau mountains, Tashkent Region	-	-	CoL	-	-
73	Greenheaded worm Allolobophora chlorocephala		Allolobophora chlorocephala	Khumsan, Karjantau mountains, Tashkent Region	2 (VU:R) Vulnerable, naturally rare	-	CoL	-	-
74	Shadowthrive worm Allolobophora umbrophila		Allolobophora umbrophila	Khumsan, Karjantau mountains, Tashkent Region	2 (VU:R) Vulnerable, naturally rare	-	CoL	-	-
75	Earthworm Allolobophora graciosa		Allolobophora graciosa	Sidzhak, Karjantau mountains, Tashkent Region	-	-	CoL	-	-
76	Earthworm Allolobophora stenosoma		Allolobophora stenosoma	Chimgan, Burchmullo, Sidzhak, Tashkent Region	-	-	CoL	-	-
