= List of ecoregions in Uzbekistan =

Alai–Western Tian Shan steppe

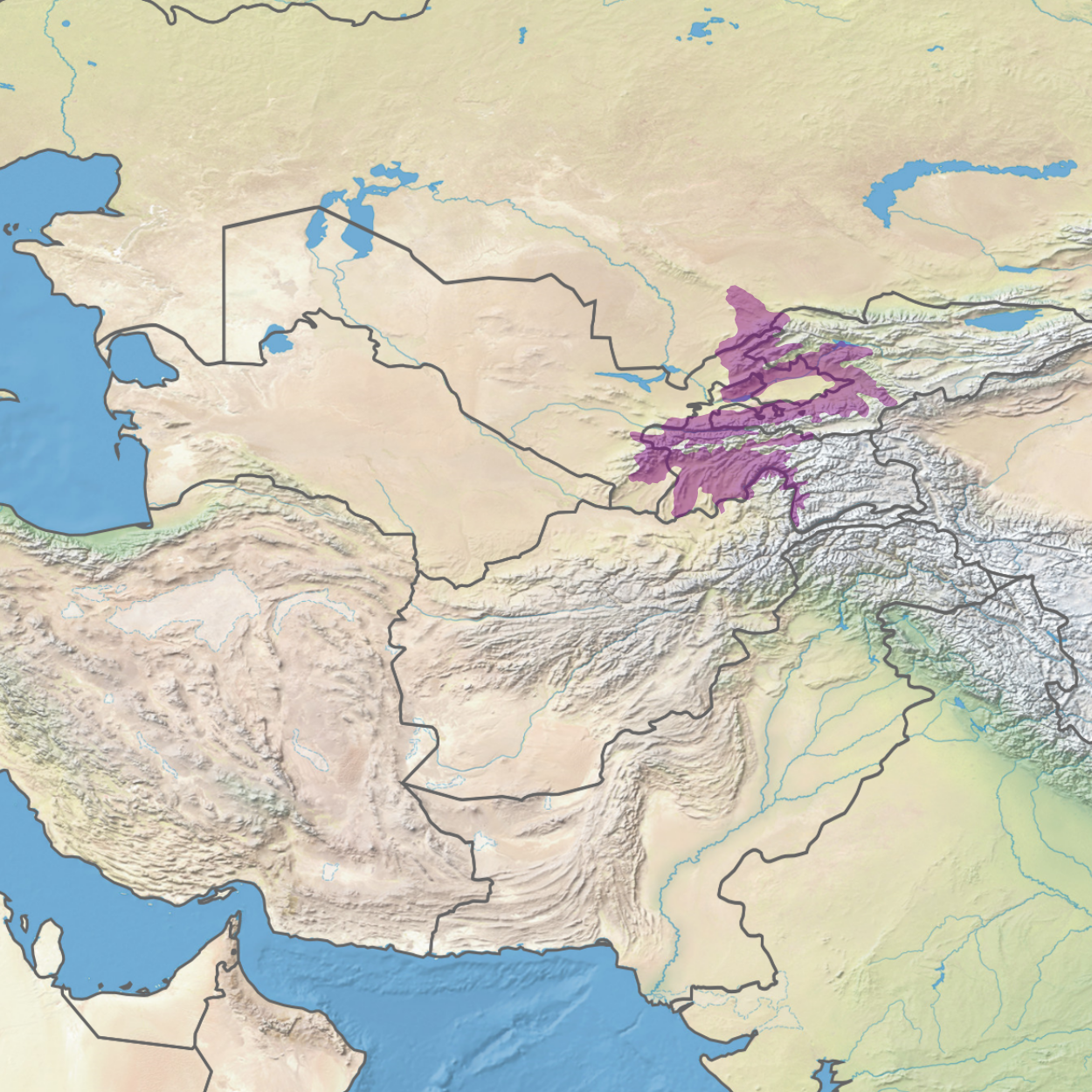
Gissaro–Alai open woodlands

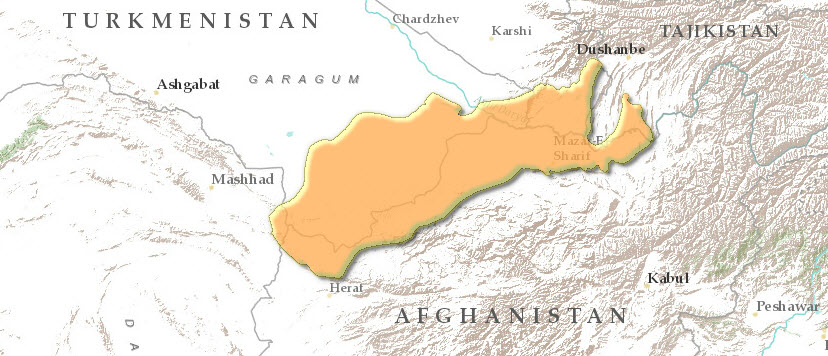
Badghyz and Karabil semi-desert

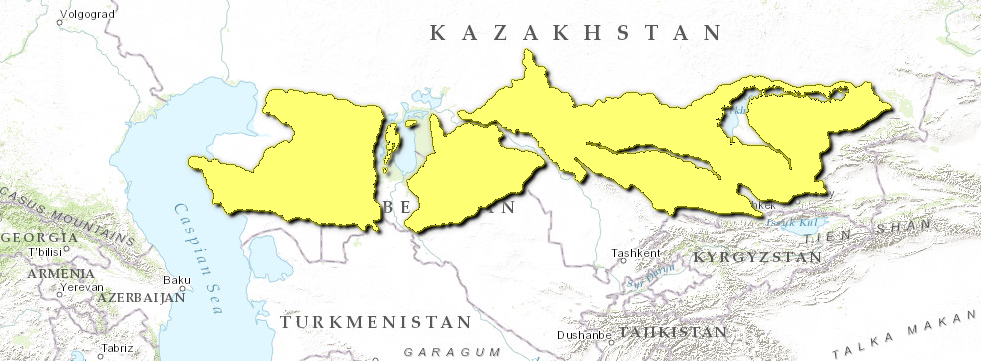
Central Asian northern desert

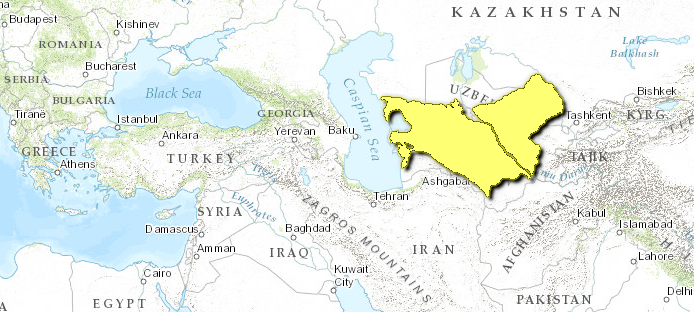
Central Asian southern desert

Central Asian riparian woodlands

The following is a list of ecoregions in Uzbekistan, according to the World Wide Fund for Nature (WWF).

== Terrestrial ==
=== Temperate grasslands, savannas, and shrublands ===
- Alai–Western Tian Shan steppe (Kyrgyzstan, Kazakhstan, Tajikistan, Turkmenistan, Uzbekistan)
- Gissaro–Alai open woodlands (Afghanistan, Kazakhstan, Kyrgyzstan, Tajikistan, Uzbekistan)

=== Deserts and xeric shrublands ===
- Badghyz and Karabil semi-desert (Afghanistan, Iran, Tajikistan, Turkmenistan, Uzbekistan)
- Central Asian northern desert (Kazakhstan, Kyrgyzstan, Uzbekistan)
- Central Asian southern desert (Kazakhstan, Turkmenistan, Uzbekistan)
- Central Asian riparian woodlands (Kazakhstan, Turkmenistan, Uzbekistan)

== See also ==
- List of terrestrial ecoregions (WWF)
- Lists of ecoregions by country
- Palearctic realm
