= Melitaea acraeina =

Scientific classification
- Kingdom: Animalia
- Phylum: Arthropoda
- Clade: Pancrustacea
- Class: Insecta
- Order: Lepidoptera
- Family: Nymphalidae
- Genus: Melitaea
- Species: M. acraeina

Binomial name
- Melitaea acraeina Otto Staudinger, 1886

Species of moth

Melitaea acraeina is a rare species of butterfly in the family Nymphalidae. It is among the most narrowly distributed and critically endangered butterflies in the world. The species was first described by Otto Staudinger in 1886, based on specimens collected near Kokand, Uzbekistan. For a long time, the species was believed to be possibly extinct. However, a surviving population was rediscovered in 1989 by the well-known specialist in Central Asian butterflies, Alexander Kreuzberg, near the village of Akaltin in the Andijan Region of Uzbekistan.

Although it originally inhabited natural desert and tugai (riparian) ecosystems, Melitaea acraeina has survived by adapting to secondary habitats within agro-landscapes, particularly the slopes of drainage canals. The species is currently listed as Critically Endangered (CR) in the Red Data Book of Uzbekistan (2019). Melitaea acraeina is a narrow-range endemic species of the Fergana Valley in Uzbekistan.

== Etymology ==
The specific epithet acraeina was chosen by Staudinger to reflect the resemblance of this butterfly's wing coloration to members of the tropical tribe Acraeini in the family Nymphalidae. The bright, exotic appearance of Melitaea acraeina contrasts strongly with other species in the genus Melitaea and is considered to have notable aesthetic value.

== Description ==
Melitaea acraeina has a wingspan of 40–45 mm. The wings are pale orange-yellow with distinctive dark markings. Along the outer margin of the forewings is a row of triangular black spots. Additional black spots are located near the inner edge and the distal end of the median cell. Males are generally slightly darker than females.

== Habitat ==
Historically, Melitaea acraeina was found in sandy and semi-desert habitats between the towns of Kokand and Margilan in the Fergana Valley. These included open deserts, arid lands, and tugai forests near rivers and lakes. The species disappeared from its original range in the mid-20th century due to agricultural development.

Melitaea acraeina is confined to secondary habitats—primarily the slopes of irrigation and drainage canals in degraded agro-landscapes. These habitats are typically characterized by sparse desert-tugai vegetation and include the presence of the larval host plant Dodartia orientalis. The species is associated with the edges of desert-tugai plant communities (including Populus diversifolia, Phragmites australis, Glycyrrhiza, Limonium, Zygophyllum, Dodartia, Alhagi, Artemisia, and others), located along irrigation-drainage channels.

== Distribution ==
The species is endemic to the Fergana Valley of Uzbekistan. Historical records exist from Kokand, Yazyavan, and Akaltin. The last surviving population is found only near Akaltin village in the Andijan Region. Populations near Kokand and Yazyavan had already become extinct by the 1940s.

Fieldwork conducted since the 1980s has revealed that the Akaltin population consists of about 10 micro-populations, distributed in a mosaic pattern along several kilometers of drainage canal systems.

== Biology ==
Melitaea acraeina is univoltine, producing one generation per year. Adults fly and reproduce from late April through May, although in cooler years the flight period may extend into June. Females lay eggs in small chains of 10–20 on the lower stems of the host plant, Dodartia orientalis.

Larvae feed on the leaves, stems, and flowers of the host plant. After a brief spring feeding period, they enter diapause in June or July by burrowing into the soil at depths of 2–8 cm near the roots. They overwinter in the larval stage and resume feeding the following spring. Pupation occurs among plant debris on the soil surface, sometimes several meters from the host plant.

Adult butterflies are weak fliers and remain closely associated with microhabitats where Dodartia grows. Their dispersal is usually limited to a few dozen meters, although isolated individuals have been recorded several kilometers from the nearest known colonies, suggesting occasional long-range movement.

The species is highly host-specific (monophagous), and its caterpillars are sensitive to disturbance. When threatened, larvae display passive defense by curling into a ring and dropping to the ground.

== Conservation status ==
Melitaea acraeina is listed as Critically Endangered (CR) in the Red Data Book of Uzbekistan (2019). It was also included in the Red Data Book of the USSR (1984) under Category 1, as a narrow-range endemic on the brink of extinction. Furthermore, it was listed in the 1988 Red Data Book of the Tajik SSR, although no specimens have ever been recorded from Tajikistan.

The population is extremely small and fragmented. Peak local densities reach about 1 adult per 100 m^{2} (1,100 sq ft) under favorable conditions, and total annual population size is estimated at fewer than 500 adults.

Key threats include:

- Destruction of natural tugai forests and desert ecosystems due to agricultural expansion.
- Excavator-based cleaning of drainage canals, which destroys both Dodartia plants and diapausing larvae.
- Endoparasitism by hymenopteran parasitoids (family Pteromalidae), which affects 5–25% of larvae.

Despite previous assumptions of extinction, the species has shown a degree of resilience by adapting to human-altered landscapes. Its continued survival, however, depends on the presence of suitable Dodartia patches. Current conservation measures are limited but may include the proposed Yazyavan Nature Reserve, which could protect key microhabitats such as the Akaltin population.

== In culture ==
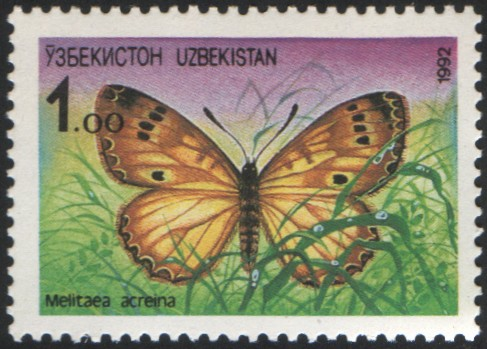
Uzbekistan stamp

In 1992, Melitaea acraeina was featured on the second postage stamp ever issued by independent Uzbekistan, which had become a sovereign nation in 1991. The stamp (catalog codes: Michel: UZ 2, Scott: UZ 2, Yvert et Tellier: UZ 2, Stanley Gibbons: UZ 2) was issued on August 10, 1992, with a face value of 1 Uzbekistani som, and was designed by artist A. Yatskevich. It was printed by the Publishing Center "Marka" in Moscow using multicolor offset lithography on coated paper, with comb perforation (12 × 12¼). The total print run was 3,000,000 copies.
