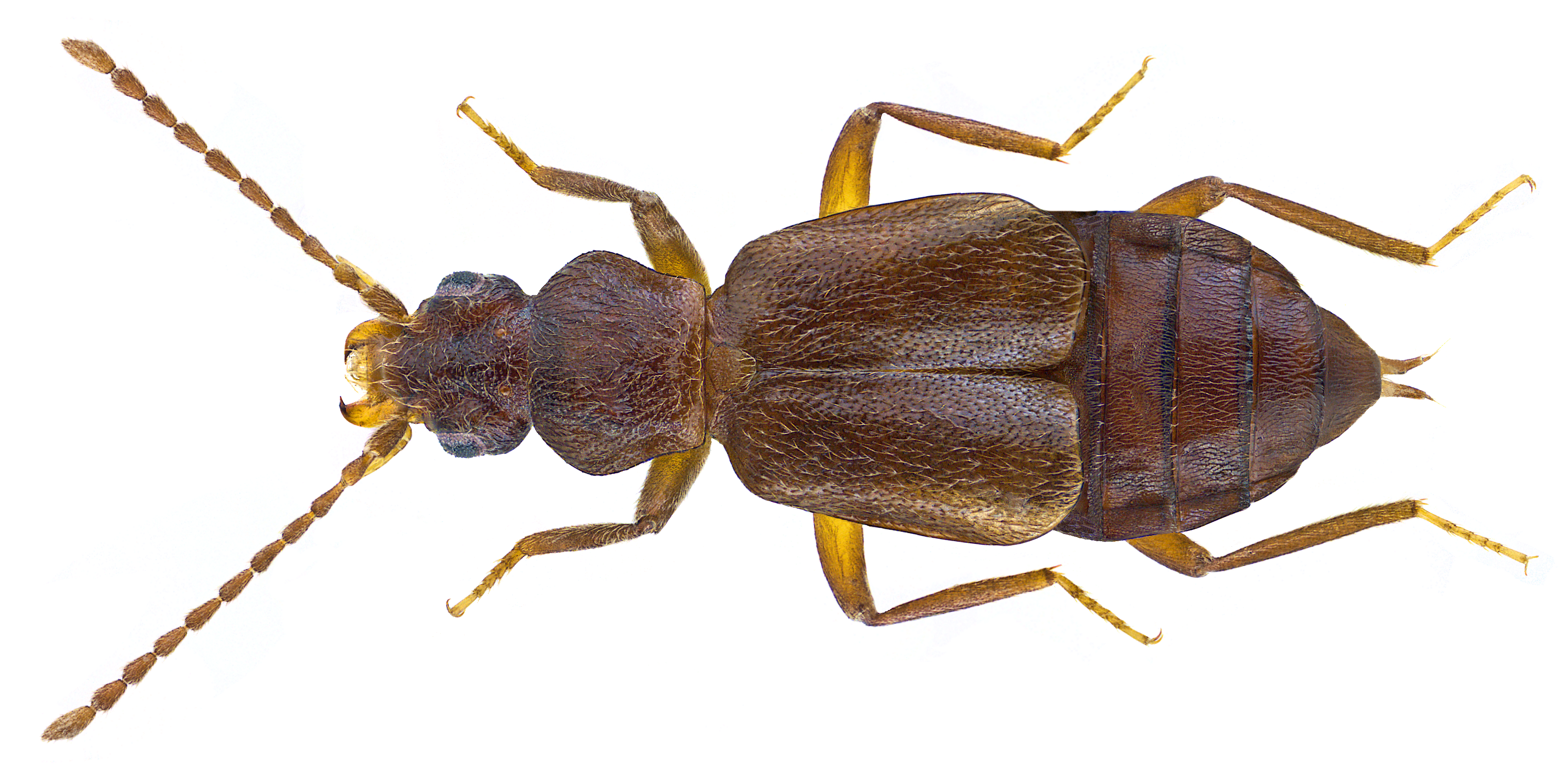
- Lesteva pubescens 4.0 mm (3.5 to 4.0 mm)

Scientific classification
- Domain: Eukaryota
- Kingdom: Animalia
- Phylum: Arthropoda
- Class: Insecta
- Order: Coleoptera
- Suborder: Polyphaga
- Infraorder: Staphyliniformia
- Family: Staphylinidae
- Genus: Lesteva
- Species: L. pubescens

Binomial name
- Lesteva pubescens Mannerheim, 1830

= Lesteva pubescens =

Species of beetle

Lesteva pubescens is a species of rove beetle native to Europe.
