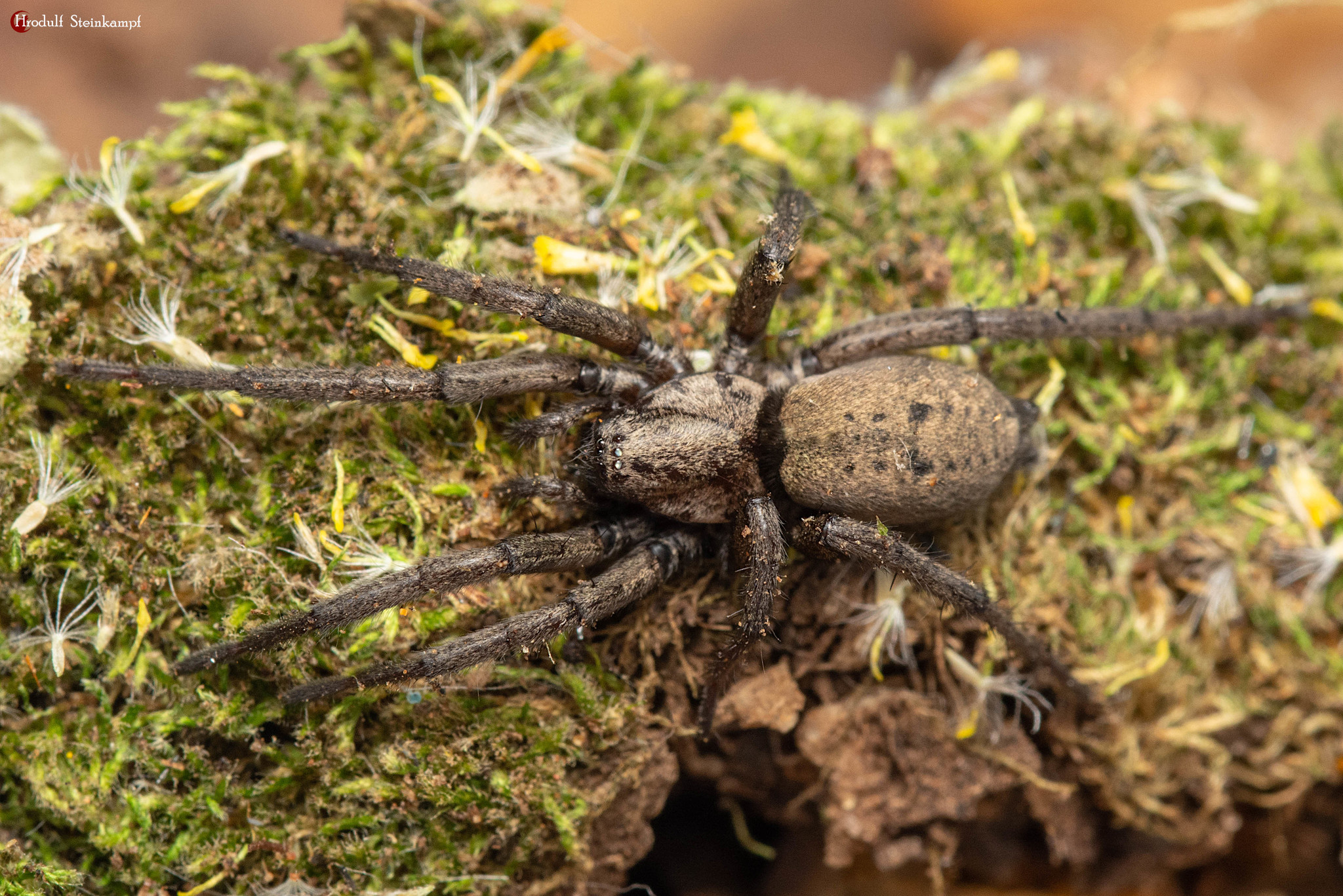
- female
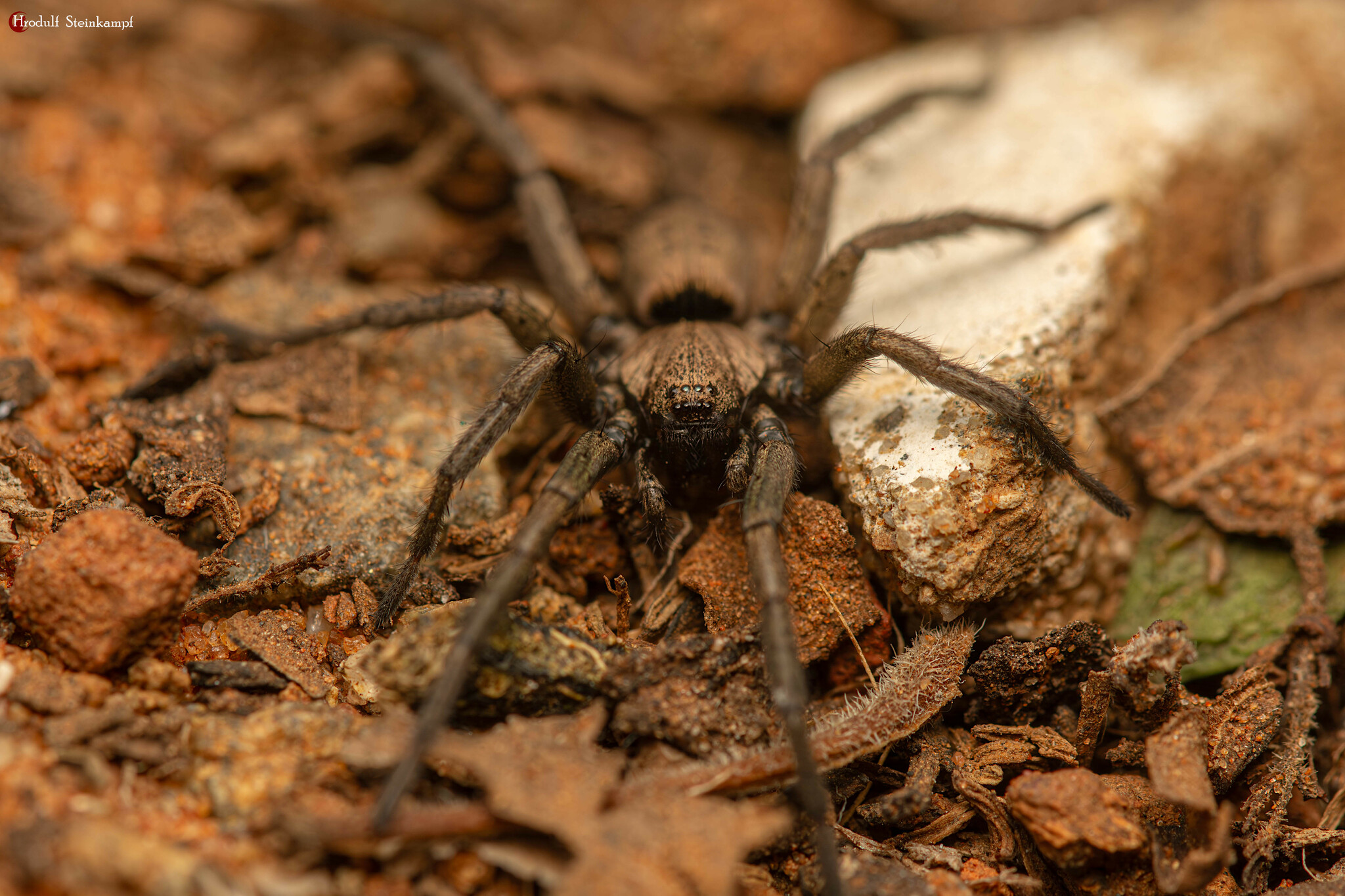
- female

Scientific classification
- Kingdom: Animalia
- Phylum: Arthropoda
- Subphylum: Chelicerata
- Class: Arachnida
- Order: Araneae
- Infraorder: Araneomorphae
- Family: Gnaphosidae
- Genus: Pterotricha
- Species: P. auris

Binomial name
- Pterotricha auris (Tucker, 1923)

Synonyms
- Callilepis auris Tucker, 1923

= Pterotricha auris =

Pterotricha Ground Spider

Species of spider

Pterotricha auris is a species of spider in the family Gnaphosidae. It is endemic to southern Africa and is commonly known as Pterotricha ground spider.

== Distribution ==
Pterotricha auris is found in Botswana, Lesotho, and South Africa. In South Africa, it is recorded from seven provinces: Eastern Cape, Free State, Gauteng, Limpopo, Mpumalanga, Northern Cape, and Western Cape. Notable locations include Strydfontein, Amanzi Private Game Reserve, Klipriviersberg Nature Reserve, Blouberg Nature Reserve, Kruger National Park, and Bontebok National Park.

== Habitat and ecology ==
The species is a free-living ground dweller found at altitudes ranging from 61 to 1,730 m above sea level. It has been sampled from Nama Karoo and Savanna biomes, and also from maize, pistachio orchards, and vineyards.

== Description ==
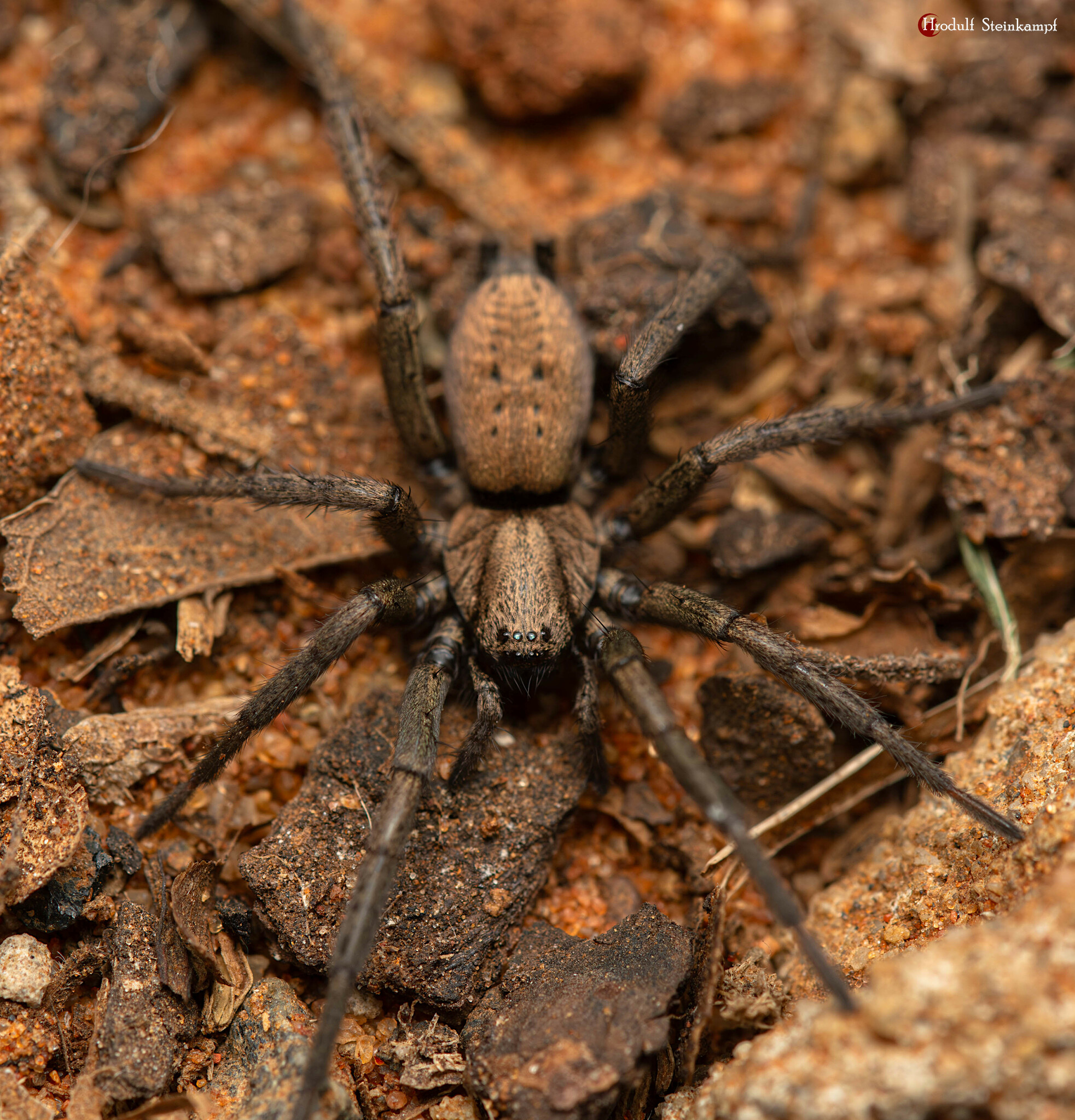
female

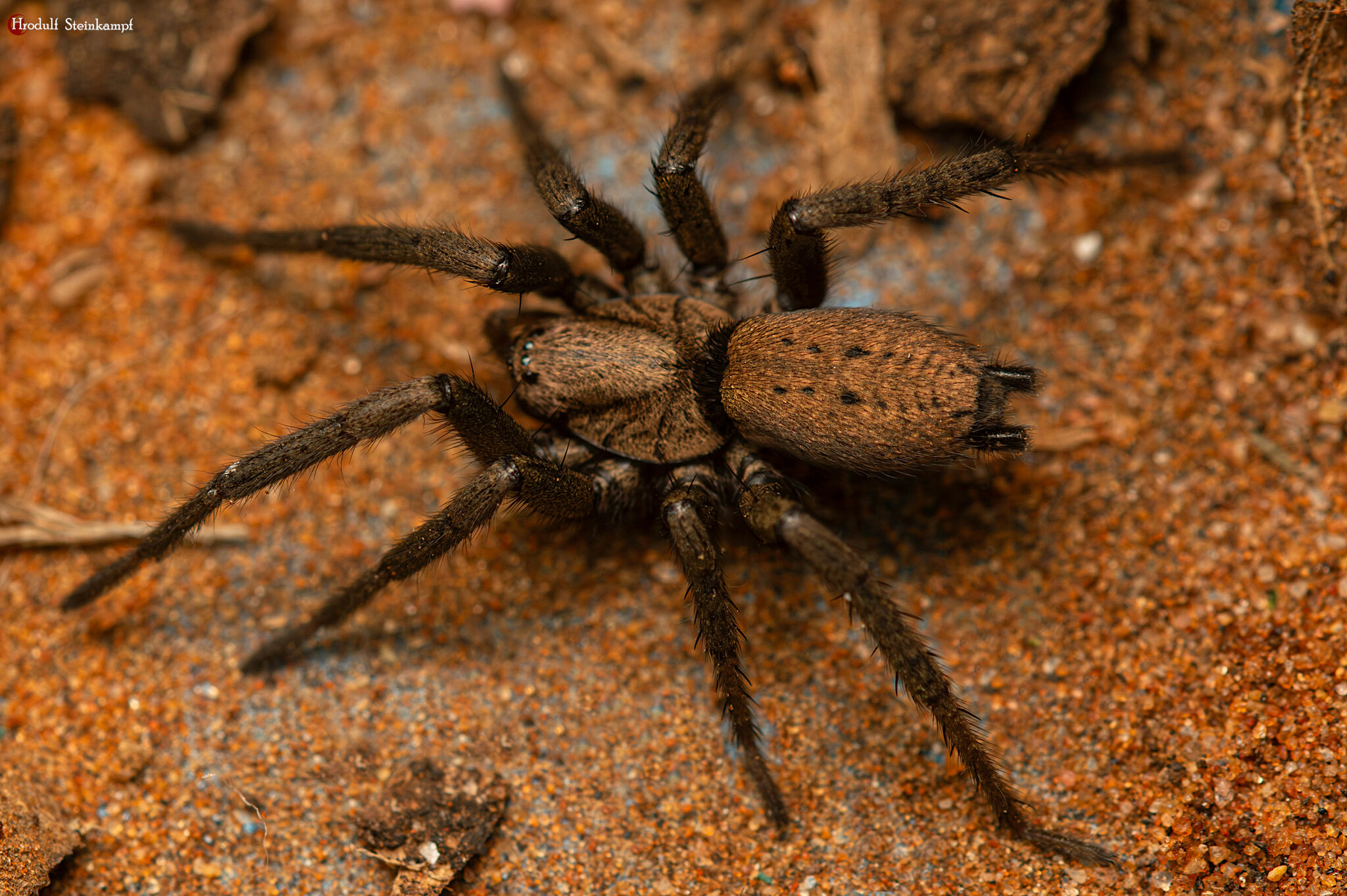
female

== Conservation ==
Pterotricha auris is listed as Least Concern by the South African National Biodiversity Institute due to its wide geographical range. There are no significant threats to the species, and it is protected in seven protected areas.

== Taxonomy ==
The species was originally described by Tucker in 1923 as Callilepis auris from Montagu Baths in the Western Cape. It is known from both sexes.
