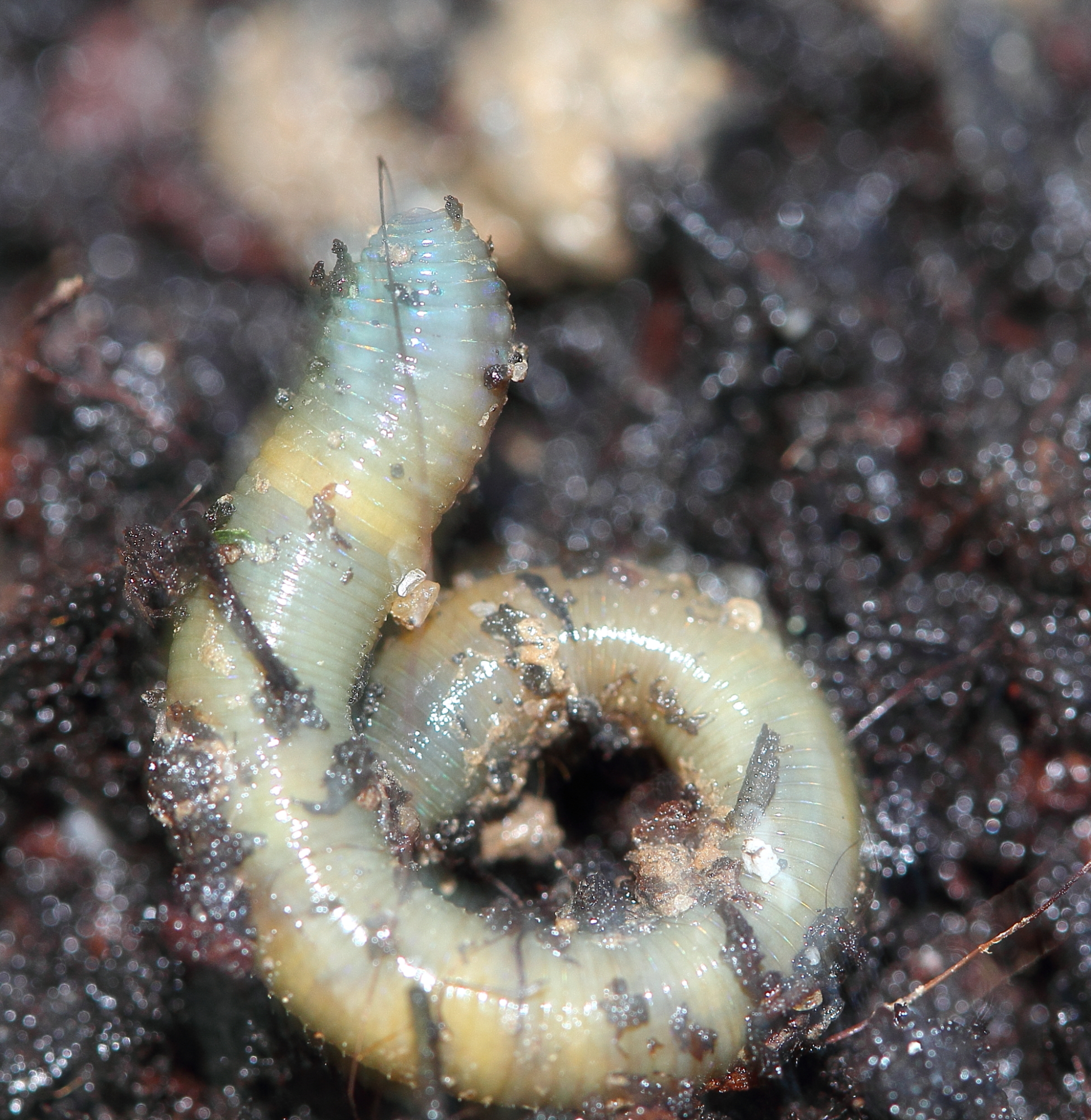
- Green form

Scientific classification
- Domain: Eukaryota
- Kingdom: Animalia
- Phylum: Annelida
- Clade: Pleistoannelida
- Clade: Sedentaria
- Class: Clitellata
- Order: Opisthopora
- Family: Lumbricidae
- Genus: Allolobophora
- Species: A. chlorotica

Binomial name
- Allolobophora chlorotica (Savigny, 1826)

= Allolobophora chlorotica =

Species of annelid worm

Allolobophora chlorotica (commonly known as the green worm) is a species of earthworm that feeds and lives in soil. This species stands out from other earthworms due to the presence of three pairs of sucker-like discs on the underside of the clitellum. An examination of A. chlorotica specimens from many parts of the British Isles suggests that there are two forms of this species, one with green pigment in the body wall, and one which lacks this pigment, making it pink.

== Anatomy ==
Allolobophora chlorotica is a medium-sized earthworm, adults measuring approximately 50 mm in length. This species is unique in that it has three pairs of sucker-like discs on alternate segments on the underside of its clitellum.

== Taxonomy ==
Allolobophora chlorotica is now thought to comprise more than one species. Genetic research carried out by Cardiff University suggests the figure could be as high as four. Certain research led by Central Lancashire University has shown that the pink and green morphs are very likely to be separate species.

These different color morphs are thought to have different habitat niches, green morphs needing very wet conditions while the pink morph favors slightly drier conditions.

=== Genetics ===
Recent breeding experiments have put into question the status of the green and pink color morphs of Allolobophora chlorotica, and whether or not they should be classified as two different species. Pairs were set up for 10 days to facilitate mating, separated, and then maintained in isolation for 28 days to obtain individual reproduction results. Cocoon production and viability were first determined from intra-morphic (p×p and g×g) and inter-morphic (p×g) pairings. All pairings bred true, but when the inter-morphic pairs reproduced, the viability of both was significantly lower, but cocoons produced by the green worm were considerably lower.

Experiments have revealed that the green color generally cannot be seen in Allolobophora chlorotica that are under 2 cm in length and 4 to 6 months old. In some cases, this change in color takes places after the earthworm is sexually mature and develops a clitellum, taking up to a year for it to turn green.

== Distribution and habitat ==
Allolobophora chlorotica is native to the Palearctic, which consists of Europe, Asia north of the foothills of the Himalayas, North Africa, and the northern and central parts of the Arabian Peninsula. It has also now been introduced in North and South America, Africa and New Zealand. It can be found in a wide range of habitats, from arable land to woodland, to even front lawns. In a British study, this species was recorded in all habitats except pine woodland and mires. They are also often the numerically dominant earthworm species in England, especially in neutral to base-rich grasslands and arable soils.

Because Allolobophora chlorotica is an endogeic worm, it builds complex lateral burrow systems through all layers of the upper mineral soil. This species of worm rarely comes to the surface, instead it spends its life in these burrow systems where they feed on mineral soil and decayed organic matter.

Populations of the entirely pink morphs can be found in gardens and woodlands. The green morphs can be found in grasslands, ditches, banks of streams and lakes and among the roots of aquatic plants such as reed mace. In northern England, mixed populations of both pink and green morphs have been found in grasslands.

=== Conservation ===
Unfortunately, the abundance and distribution of earthworm species is poorly known in Europe. In the UK, there is an OPAL national survey of the 13 most common UK species (including A. chlorotica) and research being carried out by NHM staff with volunteers funded by Natural England that will provide more information once it is released.

== Ecology ==
Allolobophora chlorotica is considered an endogeic worm, which means that they are topsoil or subsoil-dwelling worms that feed on soil, burrow and cast within soil, and create horizontal burrows in the upper 10–30 cm of soil.

A 1959 survey of 17 sites in northern England supporting Allolobophora chlorotica populations seemed to indicate a possible relationship between soil moisture levels and the distribution of the pink and green morphs. It was found that sites which had a soil moisture content greater than 40% supported populations which were made up of more than 90% green morphs. A suggestion was made that it may not be simply the soil moisture content that affects distribution of the colour morphs but that it might be availability of the soil water to the earthworms that is important.
