= Zygaena ferganae =

Scientific classification
- Kingdom: Animalia
- Phylum: Arthropoda
- Clade: Pancrustacea
- Class: Insecta
- Order: Lepidoptera
- Family: Zygaenidae
- Genus: Zygaena
- Subgenus: Agrumenia
- Species: Z. ferganae

Binomial name
- Zygaena ferganae Leo Sheljuzhko, 1941

Species of moth

Zygaena ferganae is a species of burnet moth in the family Zygaenidae. It was described by Leo Sheljuzhko in 1941 based on specimens collected in 1937 and 1938 in the Fergana Valley, Uzbekistan. The species is known only from a small historical type series and has not been observed since the 1940s. According to the Red Data Book of Uzbekistan (2019), this species is currently considered extinct. However, some authors argue that a remnant population might survive undetected because fragments of suitable habitat, other Zygaena species of similar ecology, and the presumed host plant still occur in the region.

== Description ==
Zygaena ferganae is a medium‑sized burnet moth in the olivieri group of the subgenus Agrumenia. The body is mainly black, with 5-7 bright red abdominal segments. The forewings display a dark bluish gloss and bear large, often confluent yellow spots that contain little or no red pigment, setting the species apart from the similar-looking Zygaena truchmena. The hindwings are almost entirely covered with red scales, leaving only a small transparent basal window. Females are usually slightly larger and have paler yellow markings than males.

== Distribution ==
Endemic to Uzbekistan, the moth was recorded only from several localities in the Kokand district: Katta‑Otuz‑Ashbar, Besh‑Aryk, Tschambaj, Katagan, Dshar‑Kischlak, Dzhandtal and Taulj.

== Type ==
The holotype and most of the type series are conserved in the Zoological Museum of the Taras Shevchenko National University (Kyiv, Ukraine). The reconciliation of the catalogue data shows that 23 type specimens are extant. In addition, 42 non‑type specimens collected in 1940 are also held in Kyiv. These preserved specimens represent the last physical evidence of the species. Also, according to oral information from curator Igor Yu. Kostjuk, two paratypes were presented to the late Professor Clas M. Naumann and are now presumed to be in a German collection.

== Conservation status ==
Zygaena ferganae is listed as Extinct (EX) in the most recent edition of the Red Data Book of Uzbekistan (2019).
