= Alai–Western Tian Shan steppe =

Mountain range in Central Asia

Alai-Western Tian Shan steppe
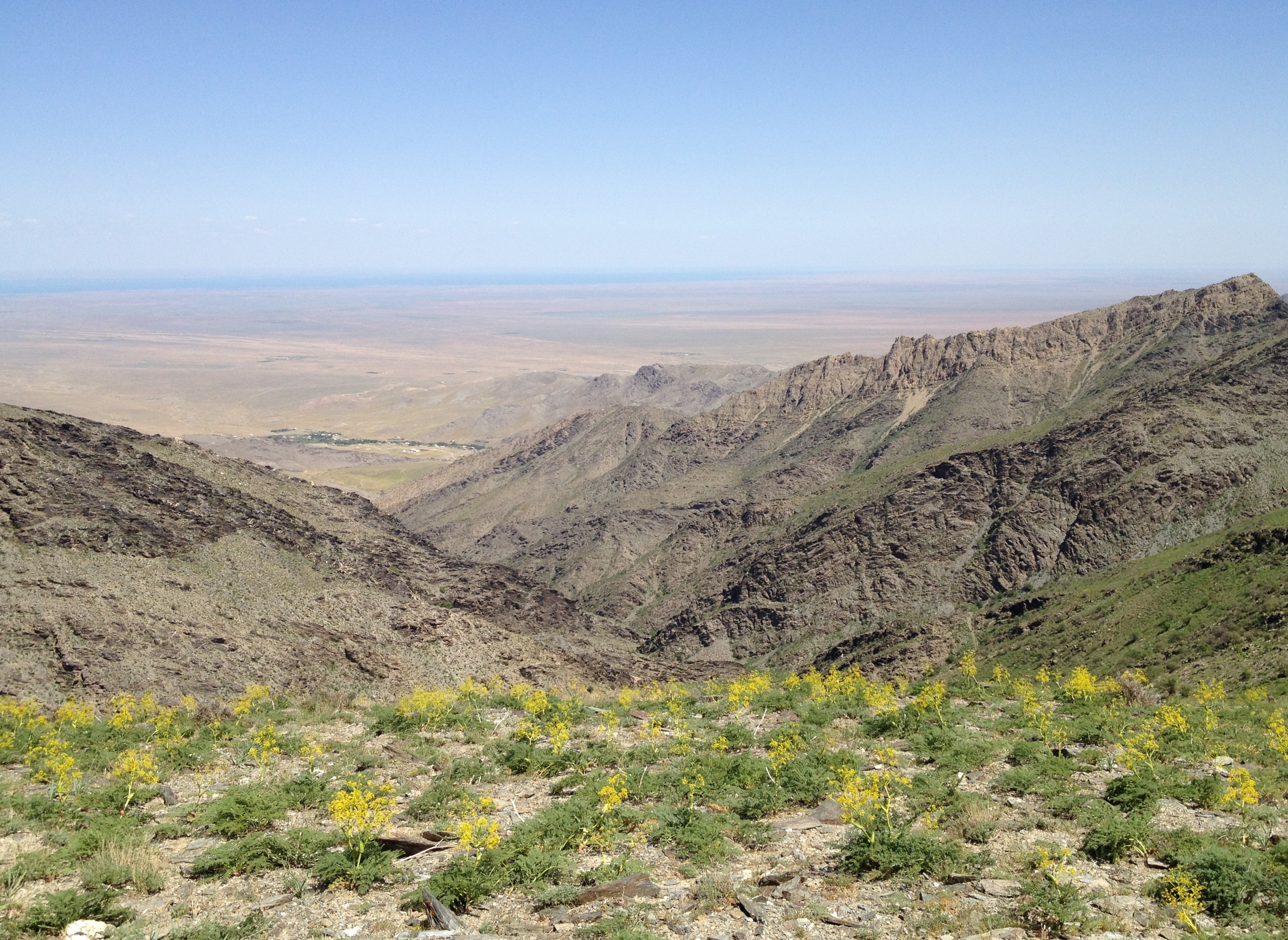
- Nuratau Mountains and Aydar Lake

- Ecoregion territory (encircled in purple)

Ecology
- Realm: Palearctic
- Biome: Temperate grasslands, savannas, and shrublands

Geography
- Country: Kazakhstan, Uzbekistan, Turkmenistan
- Coordinates: 40.5°N 67.2°E

The Alai-Western Tian Shan steppe ecoregion (WWF ID: PA0801) covers the foothills on the western edge of the Tien Shan and Alay Mountains of Central Asia. This territory is mostly in southeastern Uzbekistan, with a portion running north into Kazakhstan on the east side of the Syr Darya River, and a small portion in Turkmenistan.

== Location and description ==
The ecoregion stretches 650 km from north to south, from 50 km north of the city of Turkistan in Kazakhstan to Magdanly on the eastern tip of Turkmenistan. The band of foothills is about 250 km west to east, but an additional 250 km reaches into the Fergana Valley of the far east of Uzbekistan. On the west is the Kyzylkum Desert, part of the Central Asian southern desert ecoregion. To the north is the Central Asian northern desert. To the east is the Gissaro-Alai open woodlands ecoregion. Rivers running through the ecoregion support very narrow corridors of the Central Asian riparian woodlands ecoregion. The large (4,000 km2) Aydar Lake sits in a saline depression in the middle of the region.

== Climate ==
The climate of the ecoregion is Humid continental climate - Hot, dry summer sub-type (Köppen climate classification Dsa), with large seasonal temperature differentials and a hot summer (at least one month averaging over 22 °C (72 °F), and mild winters. The driest month between April and September does not have more than 30 millimetres of precipitation. Precipitation averages 300-600 mm/year.

== Flora ==
The lower altitude hills display low herbaceous cover known as savannoids, with Bulbous meadow-grass (Poa bulbosa), sedges (Carex pachystilis), and Artemisia. Biodiversity is high, with over 2,000 species of plants recorded in the region. Higher elevations see ephemeroid grasses such as Elymus (syn. Elytrigia) and Bulbous barley (Hordeum bulbosum).
