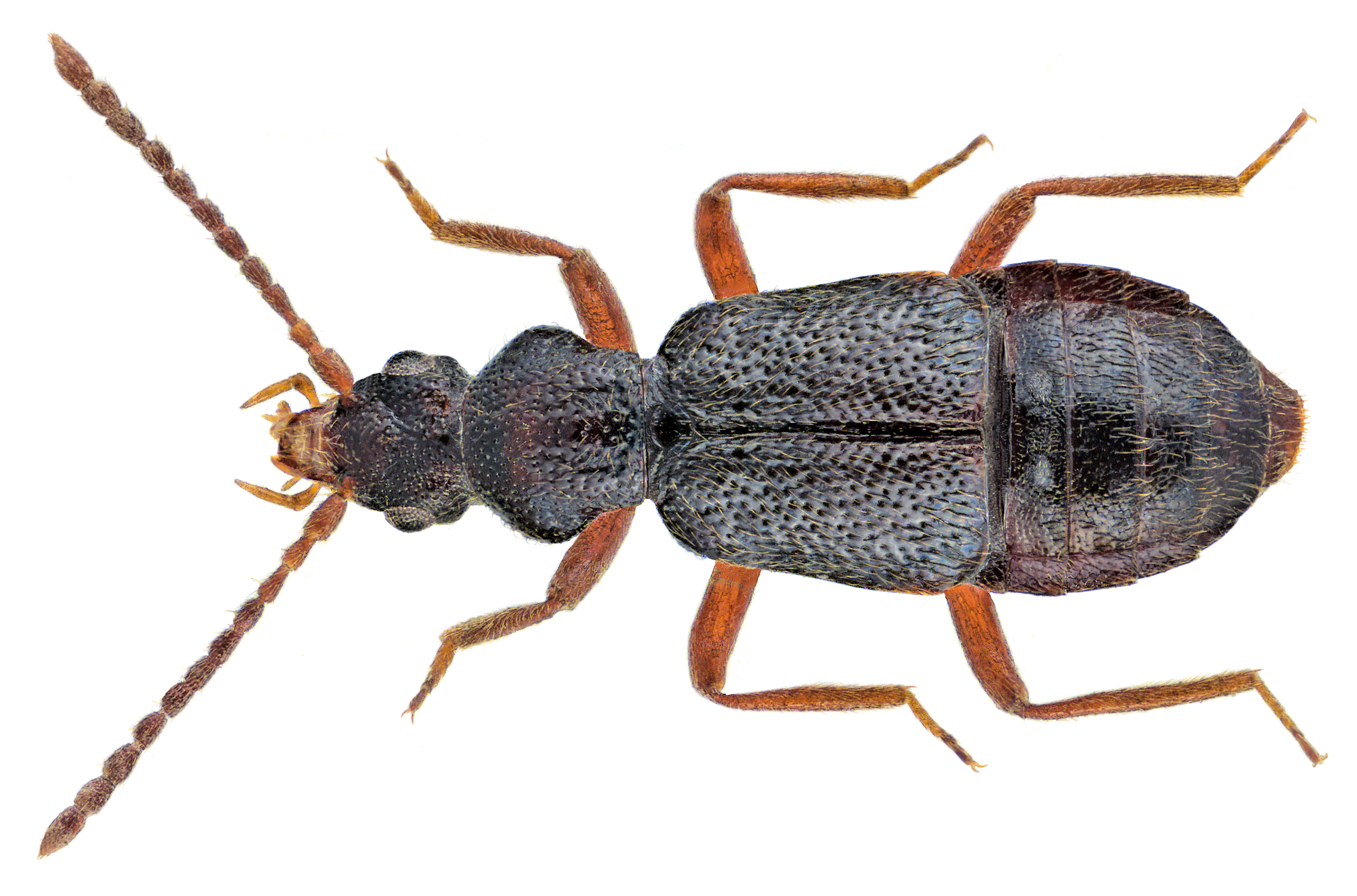

Scientific classification
- Kingdom: Animalia
- Phylum: Arthropoda
- Class: Insecta
- Order: Coleoptera
- Suborder: Polyphaga
- Infraorder: Staphyliniformia
- Family: Staphylinidae
- Genus: Lesteva
- Species: L. punctata

Binomial name
- Lesteva punctata (Erichson, 1839)

Synonyms
- Lesteva villosa

= Lesteva punctata =

Species of beetle

Lesteva punctata is a species of beetle belonging to the family Staphylinidae.

It is native to Europe.
