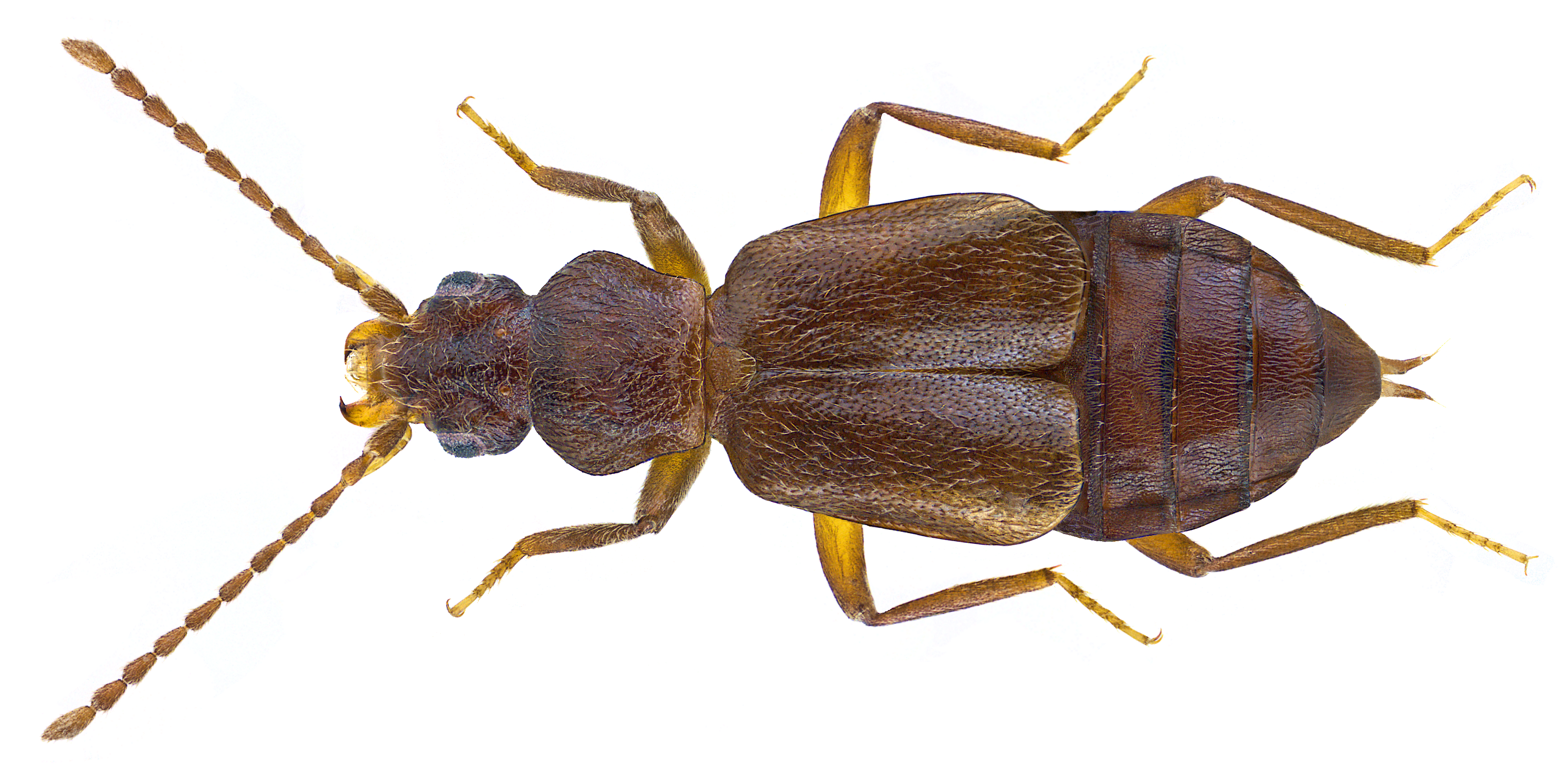

Scientific classification
- Kingdom: Animalia
- Phylum: Arthropoda
- Class: Insecta
- Order: Coleoptera
- Suborder: Polyphaga
- Infraorder: Staphyliniformia
- Family: Staphylinidae
- Subfamily: Omaliinae
- Tribe: Anthophagini
- Genus: Lesteva; Latreille, 1797

= Lesteva =

Genus of beetles

Lesteva is a genus of ocellate rove beetles in the family Staphylinidae. There are at least 60 described species in Lesteva.

== Species ==
These 70 species belong to the genus Lesteva:

- Lesteva albanica Bernhauer, 1936^{g}
- Lesteva angusticollis Mannerheim, 1830^{g}
- Lesteva aterrima Lohse, 1967^{g}
- Lesteva aureomontis Rougemont, 2000^{c g}
- Lesteva balearica Lohse, 1967^{g}
- Lesteva barguzinica Shavrin, Shilenkov & Anistschenko^{g}
- Lesteva bavarica Lohse, 1956^{g}
- Lesteva benicki Lohse, 1958^{g}
- Lesteva brathinoides Zerche, 2000^{g}
- Lesteva breiti Lohse, 1956^{g}
- Lesteva brondeeli Lohse & Steel, 1961^{g}
- Lesteva cazorlana Lohse, 1987^{g}
- Lesteva chujoi Watanabe, 2005^{g}
- Lesteva coiffaiti Jarrige, 1963^{g}
- Lesteva cooteri Rougemont, 2000^{c g}
- Lesteva corsica Perris, 1869^{g}
- Lesteva curvipes Mulsant & Rey, 1880^{g}
- Lesteva dabanensis Shavrin, Shilenkov & Anistschenko^{g}
- Lesteva dabashanensis Rougemont, 2000^{c g}
- Lesteva davidiana Rougemont, 2000^{c g}
- Lesteva dubia Lacordaire, 1835^{g}
- Lesteva elegantula Rougemont, 2000^{c g}
- Lesteva fageli Lohse, 1960^{g}
- Lesteva flavopunctata Rougemont, 2000^{c g}
- Lesteva fontinalis Kiesenwetter, 1850^{g}
- Lesteva foveolata Luze, 1903^{g}
- Lesteva graeca Scheerpeltz, 1931^{g}
- Lesteva hanseni Lohse, 1953^{g}
- Lesteva huabeiensis Rougemont, 2000^{c g}
- Lesteva ihsseni Lohse, 1956^{g}
- Lesteva jaechi Shavrin, 2017^{g}
- Lesteva kargilensis Cameron,1934^{c g}
- Lesteva kirbii Stephens, 1834^{g}
- Lesteva latipes Lohse & Steel, 1961^{g}
- Lesteva lepontia Baudi, 1870^{g}
- Lesteva lewisi Cameron,1930^{c g}
- Lesteva longicornis Bernhauer, 1929^{g}
- Lesteva longoelytrata (Goeze, 1777)^{g}
- Lesteva luctuosa Fauvel, 1871^{g}
- Lesteva lusitana Lohse, 1955^{g}
- Lesteva mariei Jarrige, 1963^{g}
- Lesteva mateui Jarrige, 1954^{g}
- Lesteva mollis Rougemont, 2000^{c g}
- Lesteva monticola Kiesenwetter, 1847^{g}
- Lesteva nitidicollis Lohse & Steel, 1961^{g}
- Lesteva nivalis Rougemont, 2000^{c g}
- Lesteva ochra Li et al., 2005^{c g}
- Lesteva omissa Mulsant & Rey, 1880^{g}
- Lesteva pallipes LeConte, 1863^{g b}
- Lesteva pourtoyi Jarrige, 1972^{g}
- Lesteva praeses Fauvel, 1900^{g}
- Lesteva pubescens Mannerheim, 1830^{g}
- Lesteva pulcherrima Rougemont, −2000^{c g}
- Lesteva punctata Erichson, 1839^{g}
- Lesteva punctulata Latreille, 1804^{g}
- Lesteva rufimarginata Rougemont, 2000^{c g}
- Lesteva rufopunctata Rougemont, 2000^{c g}
- Lesteva sajanensis Zerche, 2000^{g}
- Lesteva sbordonii Bordoni, 1973^{g}
- Lesteva schoenmanni Shavrin, 2017^{g}
- Lesteva septemmaculata Rougemont, 2000^{c g}
- Lesteva sicula Erichson, 1840^{g}
- Lesteva somsa Shavrin, 2021^{c g}
- Lesteva steeli Lohse, 1982^{g}
- Lesteva submaculata Rougemont, 2000^{c g}
- Lesteva szekessyi Lohse & Steel, 1961^{g}
- Lesteva taygetana Lohse, 1955^{g}
- Lesteva uhligi Zanetti, 1984^{g}
- Lesteva villardi Mulsant & Rey, 1880^{g}
- Lesteva yunnanicola Rougemont, 2000^{c g}

Data sources: i = ITIS, c = Catalogue of Life, g = GBIF, b = Bugguide.net
