= Dzihunia =

Scientific classification
- Kingdom: Animalia
- Phylum: Chordata
- Class: Actinopterygii
- Order: Cypriniformes
- Family: Nemacheilidae
- Genus: Dzihunia; Prokofiev, 2001

Type species
- Nemacheilus amudarjensis Rass, 1929

Genus of fishes

Dzihunia is a genus of stone loaches native to Central Asia.

== Species ==
There are currently four recognized species in this genus:

- Dzihunia amudarjensis (Rass (ru), 1929) (Bukhara stone loach)
- Dzihunia ilan (Turdakov, 1936)
- Dzihunia pseudoamudarjensis Sheraliev & Kayumova, 2024
- Dzihunia turdakovi Prokofiev, 2003

On the other hand, in a recent molecular study on DNA barcoding in fish from Uzbekistan, it was found that the species diversity of Dzihunia is more than three, as previously believed.
