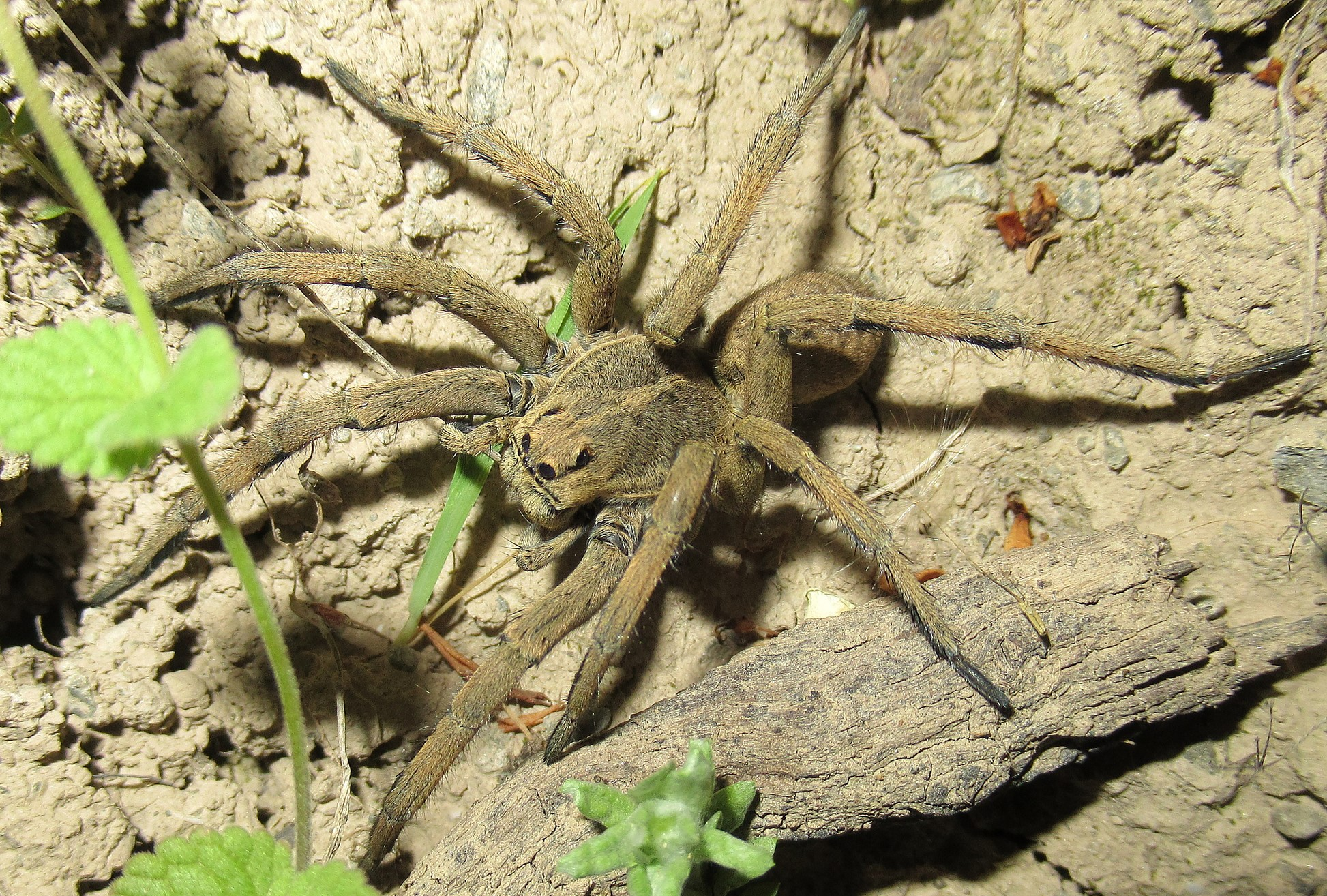
- Juvenile female in the Surxondaryo Region, Uzbekistan

Scientific classification
- Kingdom: Animalia
- Phylum: Arthropoda
- Subphylum: Chelicerata
- Class: Arachnida
- Order: Araneae
- Infraorder: Araneomorphae
- Family: Lycosidae
- Genus: Zyuzicosa
- Species: Z. andreii

Binomial name
- Zyuzicosa andreii Fomichev, 2023

= Zyuzicosa andreii =

Species of spider

Zyuzicosa andreii is a species of araneomorph spiders that belongs to the family Lycosidae. It is a large-sized burrowing species that is endemic to Uzbekistan.
