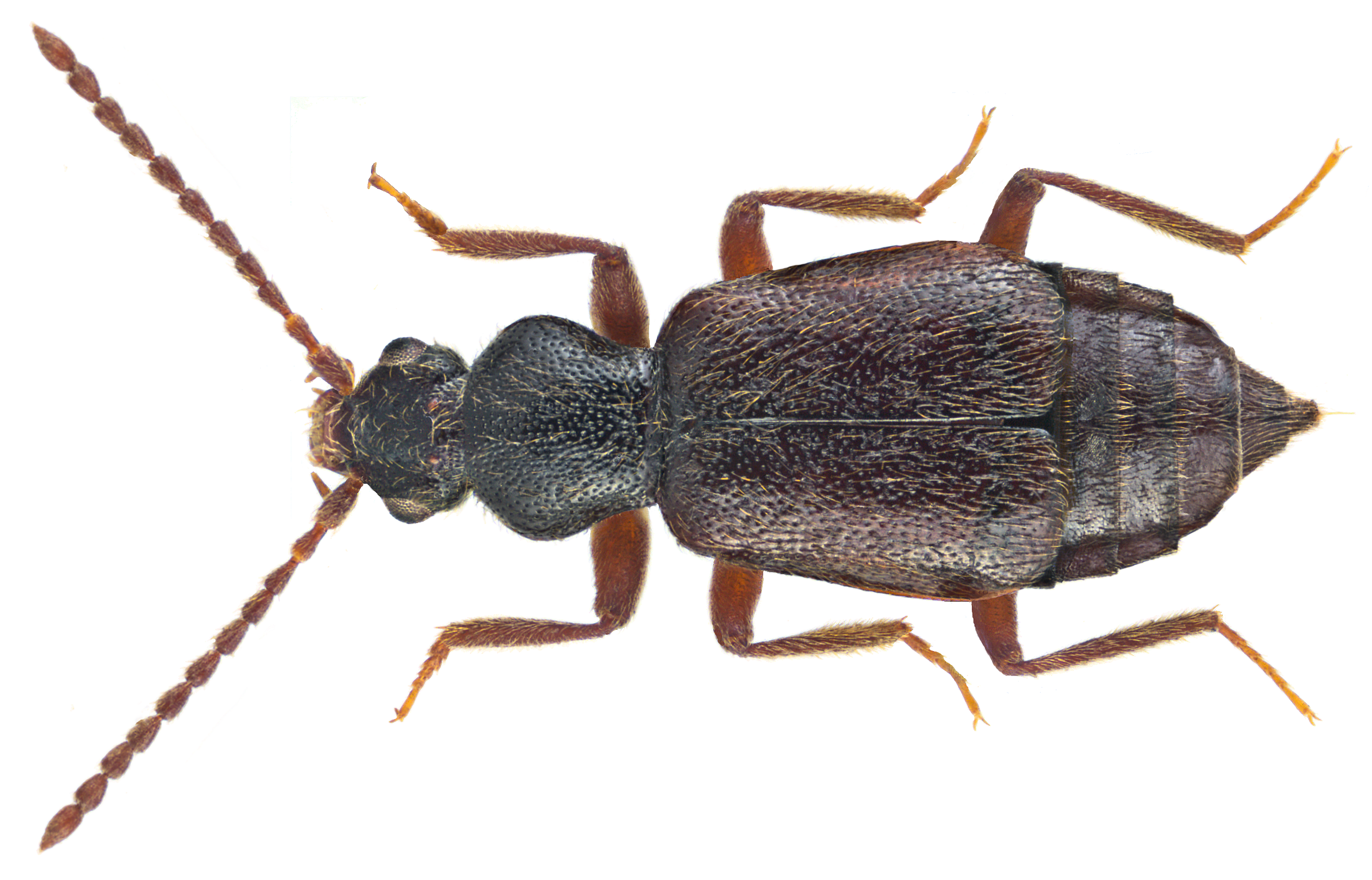

Scientific classification
- Domain: Eukaryota
- Kingdom: Animalia
- Phylum: Arthropoda
- Class: Insecta
- Order: Coleoptera
- Suborder: Polyphaga
- Infraorder: Staphyliniformia
- Family: Staphylinidae
- Genus: Lesteva
- Species: L. longoelytrata

Binomial name
- Lesteva longoelytrata (Goeze, 1777)

= Lesteva longoelytrata =

Species of beetle

Lesteva longoelytrata is a species of beetle belonging to the family Staphylinidae.

It is native to Europe.
