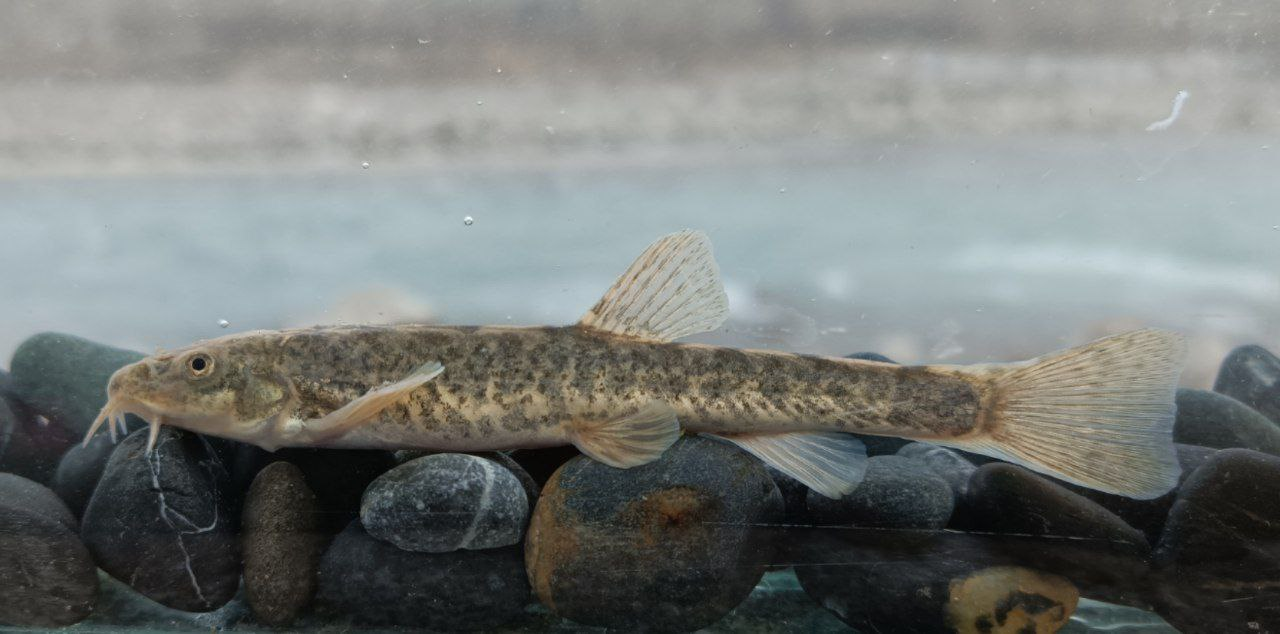

Scientific classification
- Kingdom: Animalia
- Phylum: Chordata
- Class: Actinopterygii
- Order: Cypriniformes
- Family: Nemacheilidae
- Genus: Triplophysa
- Species: T. daryoae

Binomial name
- Triplophysa daryoae Bakhtiyor Sheraliev, Kayumova & Peng, 2022

= Triplophysa daryoae =

Sokh stone loach

Species of fish

Triplophysa daryoae, the Sokh stone loach, is a species of ray-finned fish in the family Nemacheilidae. It is endemic to the Sokh River in Fergana Valley, Uzbekistan. It lives in fast-flowing rivers over 1050m in altitude.

== Description ==
It grows to 94mm SL. Eyes are present. Mouth is inferior. Gill rakers are absent in outer row, however, 9–10 gill rakers are found in the inner row on the first-gill arch. Scales are absent on the body. The lateral line is complete. Elongated body is slightly compressed anteriorly and strongly compressed posteriorly. Lips thick with furrows and papillae. Three pairs of barbels are present. Dorsal and anal fins are convex. Pectoral fins are developed. Caudal fin truncate and the tips are rounded.

== Etymology ==
The fish is named in honor of Daryo Sheralieva, the daughter of the author Bakhtiyor Sheraliev.
