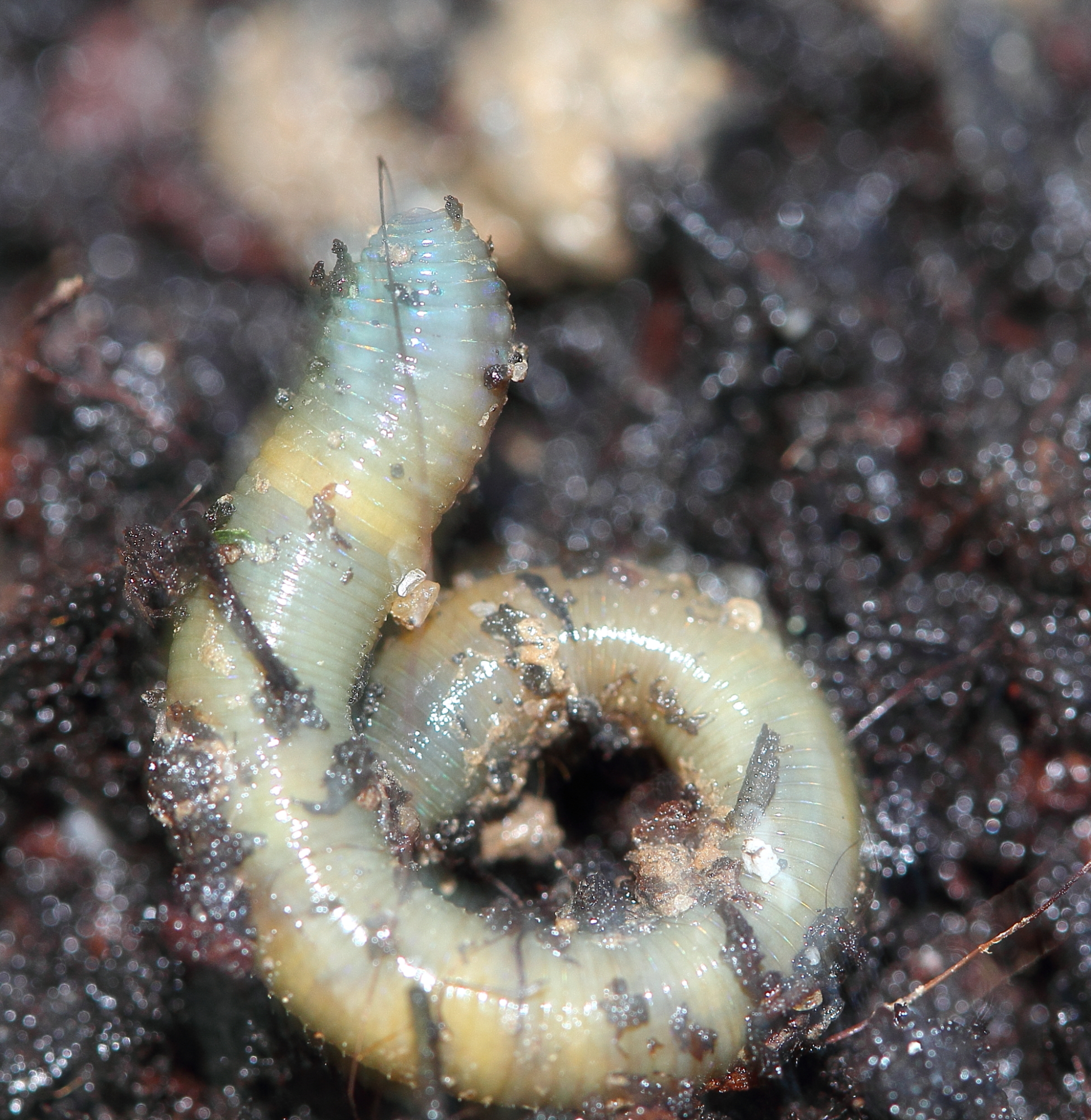
- Allolobophora chlorotica

Scientific classification
- Kingdom: Animalia
- Phylum: Annelida
- Clade: Pleistoannelida
- Clade: Sedentaria
- Class: Clitellata
- Order: Opisthopora
- Family: Lumbricidae
- Genus: Allolobophora; Eisen, 1873

= Allolobophora =

Genus of annelid worms

Allolobophora is a genus of annelids belonging to the family Lumbricidae.

The genus was first described by Eisen in 1874.

WoRMS lists:

- Allolobophora adaiensis Michaelsen, 1900
- Allolobophora albicauda Perel, 1977
- Allolobophora aporata Bretscher, 1901
- Allolobophora asconensis Bretscher, 1900
- Allolobophora beddardi Michaelsen, 1894
- Allolobophora benhami Bretscher, 1900
- Allolobophora biserialis Černosvitov, 1937
- Allolobophora bogdanowii (Kulagin, 1889)
- Allolobophora bouchei Perel, 1977
- Allolobophora brunescens Bretscher, 1900
- Allolobophora bulgarica Černosvitov, 1934
- Allolobophora chlorocephala Perel, 1977
- Allolobophora chlorotica (Savigny in Cuvier, 1826)
- Allolobophora crassa Michaelsen, 1900
- Allolobophora dacica (Pop, 1938)
- Allolobophora darwini Ribaucourt, 1896
- Allolobophora decui Botea, 1983
- Allolobophora delitescens Gérard, Decaëns & Marchán in Gérard, Marchán, Navarro, Hedde, Decaëns, 2023
- Allolobophora festae Rosa, 1892
- Allolobophora frivaldszkyi (Orley, 1885)
- Allolobophora gavrilovi Černosvitov, 1942
- Allolobophora gestroides Zicsi, 1970
- Allolobophora gracilis (Orley, 1885)
- Allolobophora graciosa Perel, 1977
- Allolobophora hrabei (Černosvitov, 1935)
- Allolobophora longocitellata Perel, 1977
- Allolobophora lonnbergi Michaelsen, 1894
- Allolobophora media Perel, 1977
- Allolobophora mehadiensis Rosa, 1895
- Allolobophora microtheca Perel, 1977
- Allolobophora mima Rosa, 1889
- Allolobophora molleri Rosa, 1889
- Allolobophora nassonowii (Kulagin, 1889)
- Allolobophora negreai Botea, 1983
- Allolobophora nematogena Rosa, 1903
- Allolobophora norvegica Eisen, 1874
- Allolobophora ophiomorpha Perel, 1977
- Allolobophora opisthocystis Rosa, 1895
- Allolobophora orghidani Botea, 1983
- Allolobophora pallida Bretscher, 1900
- Allolobophora persiana Michaelsen, 1900
- Allolobophora rebelii Rosa, 1897
- Allolobophora ribaucourti Bretscher, 1901
- Allolobophora robusta Rosa, 1895
- Allolobophora rubida (Örley, 1881)
- Allolobophora samarigera Rosa, 1893
- Allolobophora schneideri Michaelsen, 1900
- Allolobophora semitica Rosa, 1893
- Allolobophora sokolovi (Perel, 1969)
- Allolobophora stenosoma Perel, 1977
- Allolobophora sturanyi Rosa, 1895
- Allolobophora submontana (Vejdovsky, 1876)
- Allolobophora syriaca Rosa, 1893
- Allolobophora taschkentensis Michaelsen, 1900
- Allolobophora tumida Eisen, 1874
- Allolobophora umbrophila Perel, 1977
- Allolobophora zicsica Szederjesi, Pop & Csuzdi, 2016
