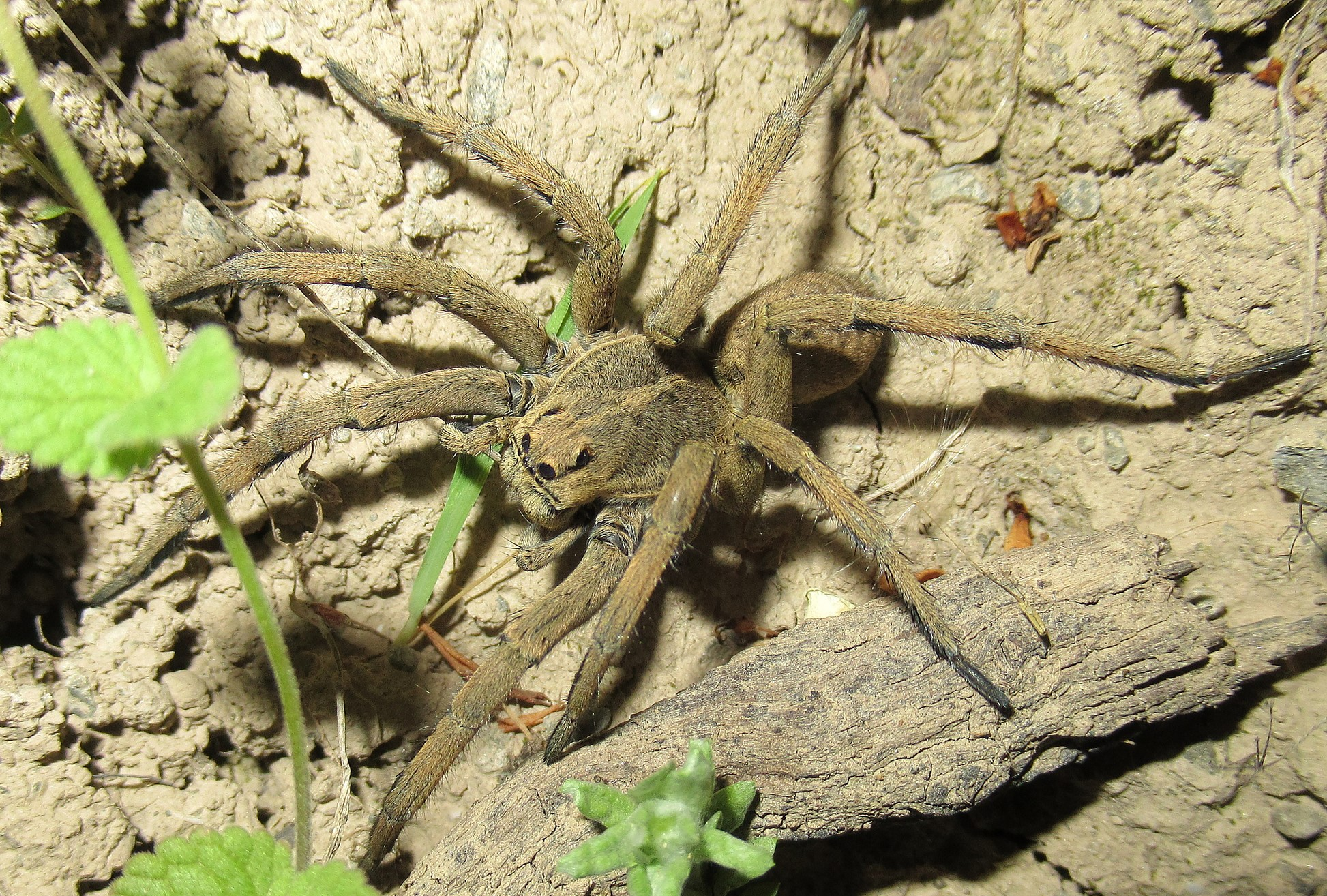
- A juvenile female Zyuzicosa andreii from Surxondaryo Region, Uzbekistan

Scientific classification
- Kingdom: Animalia
- Phylum: Arthropoda
- Subphylum: Chelicerata
- Class: Arachnida
- Order: Araneae
- Infraorder: Araneomorphae
- Family: Lycosidae
- Genus: Zyuzicosa; Logunov

Species
- 10, see text

= Zyuzicosa =

Genus of spiders

Zyuzicosa is a genus of araneomorph spiders that belongs to the family Lycosidae. It was first described in 2010 by Logunov.

== Species ==
Zyuzicosa comprises the following species:

- Zyuzicosa afghana (Roewer, 1960)
- Zyuzicosa andreii Fomichev, 2023
- Zyuzicosa baisunica Logunov, 2010
- Zyuzicosa fulviventris (Kroneberg, 1875)
- Zyuzicosa gigantea Logunov, 2010
- Zyuzicosa kopetdaghensis Logunov, 2012
- Zyuzicosa kvak Logunov, 2023
- Zyuzicosa laetabunda (Spassky, 1941)
- Zyuzicosa nenjukovi (Spassky, 1952)
- Zyuzicosa nessovi Logunov, 2012
- Zyuzicosa turlanica Logunov, 2010
- Zyuzicosa uzbekistanica Logunov, 2010
