= Lesteva somsa =

Scientific classification
- Kingdom: Animalia
- Phylum: Arthropoda
- Clade: Pancrustacea
- Class: Insecta
- Order: Coleoptera
- Suborder: Polyphaga
- Infraorder: Staphyliniformia
- Family: Staphylinidae
- Genus: Lesteva
- Species: L. somsa

Binomial name
- Lesteva somsa Shavrin, 2021

Species of beetle

Lesteva somsa is a species of rove beetle in the family Staphylinidae. It was described in 2021 by the entomologist Alexey V. Shavrin from specimens collected in the Chatkal Mountain Range in the Tashkent Region of Uzbekistan. This species belongs to the genus Lesteva, which is widely distributed across the Holarctic region and currently includes over 120 known species. Lesteva somsa is known only from its type locality and is currently considered a narrow-range endemic of Uzbekistan.

== Etymology ==
The species name "somsa" refers to "somsa" (or "samsa"), a popular pastry in Central Asia. The name alludes to the shape of the apical part of the beetle’s median lobe, which is reminiscent of the narrow tip of the drop-shaped Uzbek somsa.

== Description ==
Lesteva somsa is a small beetle, measuring between 3.8 and 4.5 millimetres in length. Its body is reddish-brown, with the antennae and legs yellowish-brown and the mouthparts and tarsi slightly paler. The elytra (wing covers) and abdomen may be a bit lighter in colour than the rest of the body. The surface of the body is glossy, with fine and dense punctures (small impressions) covering the head, pronotum, and elytra.

The head is relatively broad and slightly elevated in the middle, with large, convex eyes. The antennae are long and slender, reaching the base of the elytra. The pronotum (the plate behind the head) is broader than the head and slightly convex. The elytra are about twice as long as the pronotum and broadly rounded at the tips. The abdomen is narrower than the elytra and has small paired tomentose (velvety) spots on some segments. Only males have been collected so far; females remain unknown.

== Distribution and habitat ==
This species is currently known only from its type locality in the Chatkal Mountain Range in the Tashkent Region of Uzbekistan, part of the western Tian Shan mountains. Specimens were collected at an elevation of around 2400 metres above sea level. They were found by sifting wet mosses growing along a small mountain stream flowing into the Iertash River, a right tributary of the Okhangaron River.

== Biology ==
Little is known about the biology of Lesteva somsa. The available specimens were collected from wet mosses in a mountainous habitat, suggesting that the species may be adapted to cool, moist environments near streams. As with other members of the genus, the beetles are likely predators or scavengers, but no direct observations have been made.

== Conservation status ==
Because it is known only from a single locality, its conservation status is uncertain. Further field studies are needed to determine the size of its population, the extent of its range, and potential threats to its habitat. Lesteva somsa has not been evaluated by the International Union for Conservation of Nature (IUCN).
