= Dzihunia pseudoamudarjensis =

Uzbekistan stone loach

Scientific classification
- Kingdom: Animalia
- Phylum: Chordata
- Class: Actinopterygii
- Division: Teleostei
- Order: Cypriniformes
- Family: Nemacheilidae
- Genus: Dzihunia
- Species: D. pseudoamudarjensis

Binomial name
- Dzihunia pseudoamudarjensis Sheraliev & Kayumova, 2024

Species of fish

Dzihunia pseudoamudarjensis, the Uzbekistan stone loach, is a species of ray-finned fish in the family Nemacheilidae. It is endemic to the Fergana Valley, Uzbekistan. It lives in slowly flowing, turbid water (in spring and summer) of the Great Fergana Canal.

== Description ==
It grows to 107 mm SL. Eyes are present. Mouth is inferior. Gill rakers are absent in outer row. Scales are absent on the body. The lateral line is complete with 84-86 pores. Elongated body is slightly compressed anteriorly and strongly compressed posteriorly. Lips moderately thick, strongly furrowed, lower lip wide and medially interrupted. Three pairs of barbels are present. Dorsal fin distal margin slightly concave, anal fin distal margin straight or slightly concave. Pectoral fins are developed. Caudal fin forked.
