= Karakumosa =

Scientific classification
- Kingdom: Animalia
- Phylum: Arthropoda
- Subphylum: Chelicerata
- Class: Arachnida
- Order: Araneae
- Infraorder: Araneomorphae
- Family: Lycosidae
- Genus: Karakumosa; Logunov & Ponomarev, 2020

Type species
- K. repetek Logunov & Ponomarev, 2020

Species
- 10, see text

Genus of wolf spiders

Karakumosa is a genus of Asian wolf spiders first described by Dmitri V. Logunov and A. V. Ponomarev in 2020.

== Species ==
As of January 2022 it contains ten species:

- K. alticeps (Kroneberg, 1875) – Kazakhstan
- K. badkhyzica Logunov & Ponomarev, 2020 – Turkmenistan
- K. gromovi Logunov & Ponomarev, 2020 – Uzbekistan
- K. medica (Pocock, 1889) – Afghanistan
- K. repetek Logunov & Ponomarev, 2020 (type) – Turkmenistan
- K. reshetnikovi Logunov & Fomichev, 2021 – Tajikistan
- K. shmatkoi Logunov & Ponomarev, 2020 – Azerbaijan, Russia (Europe), Kazakhstan
- K. tashkumyr Logunov & Ponomarev, 2020 – Kyrgyzstan
- K. turanica Logunov & Ponomarev, 2020 – Turkmenistan
- K. zyuzini Logunov & Ponomarev, 2020 – Uzbekistan

== See also ==
- Hogna
- Lycosa
