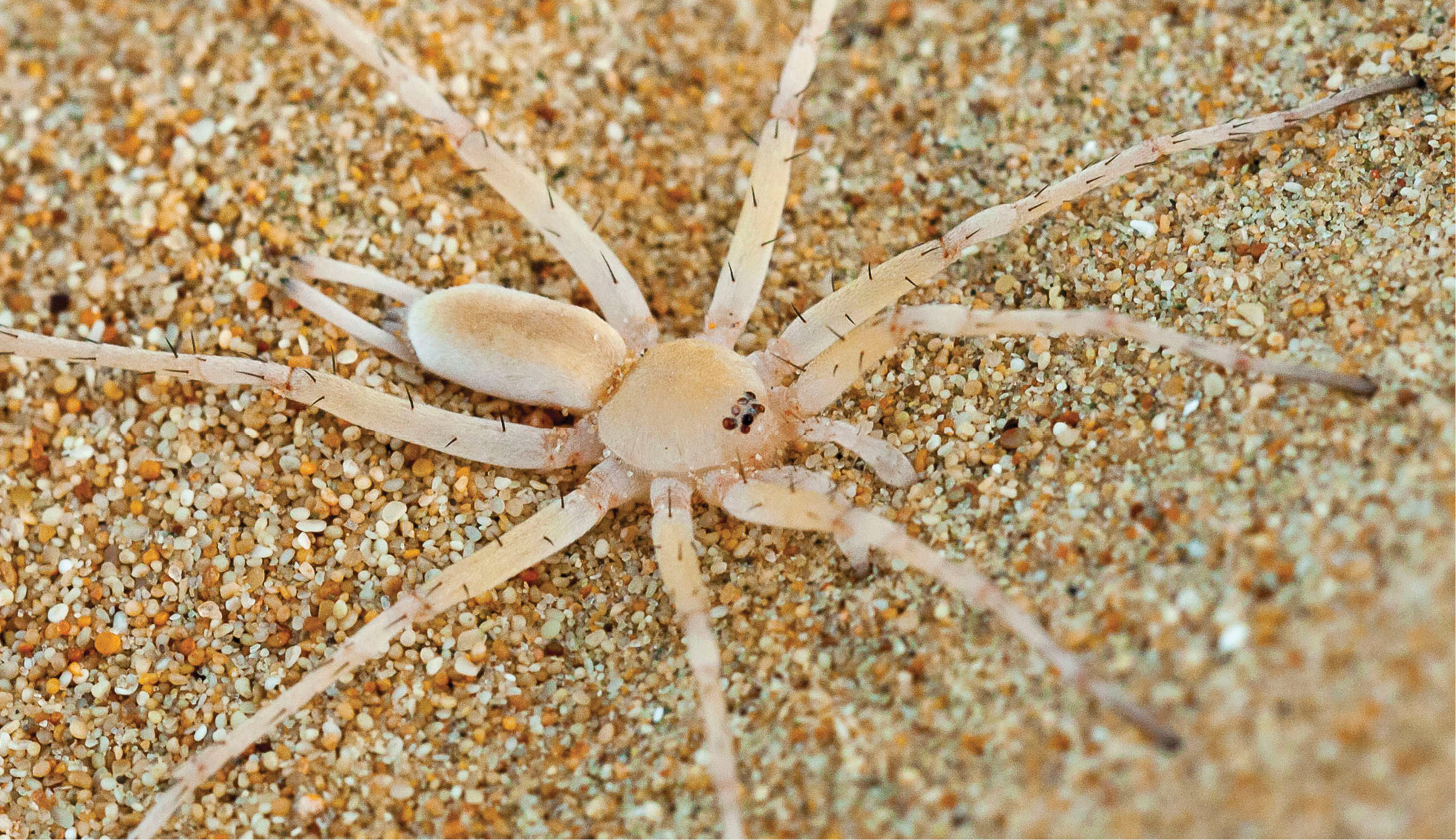
- P. arabica
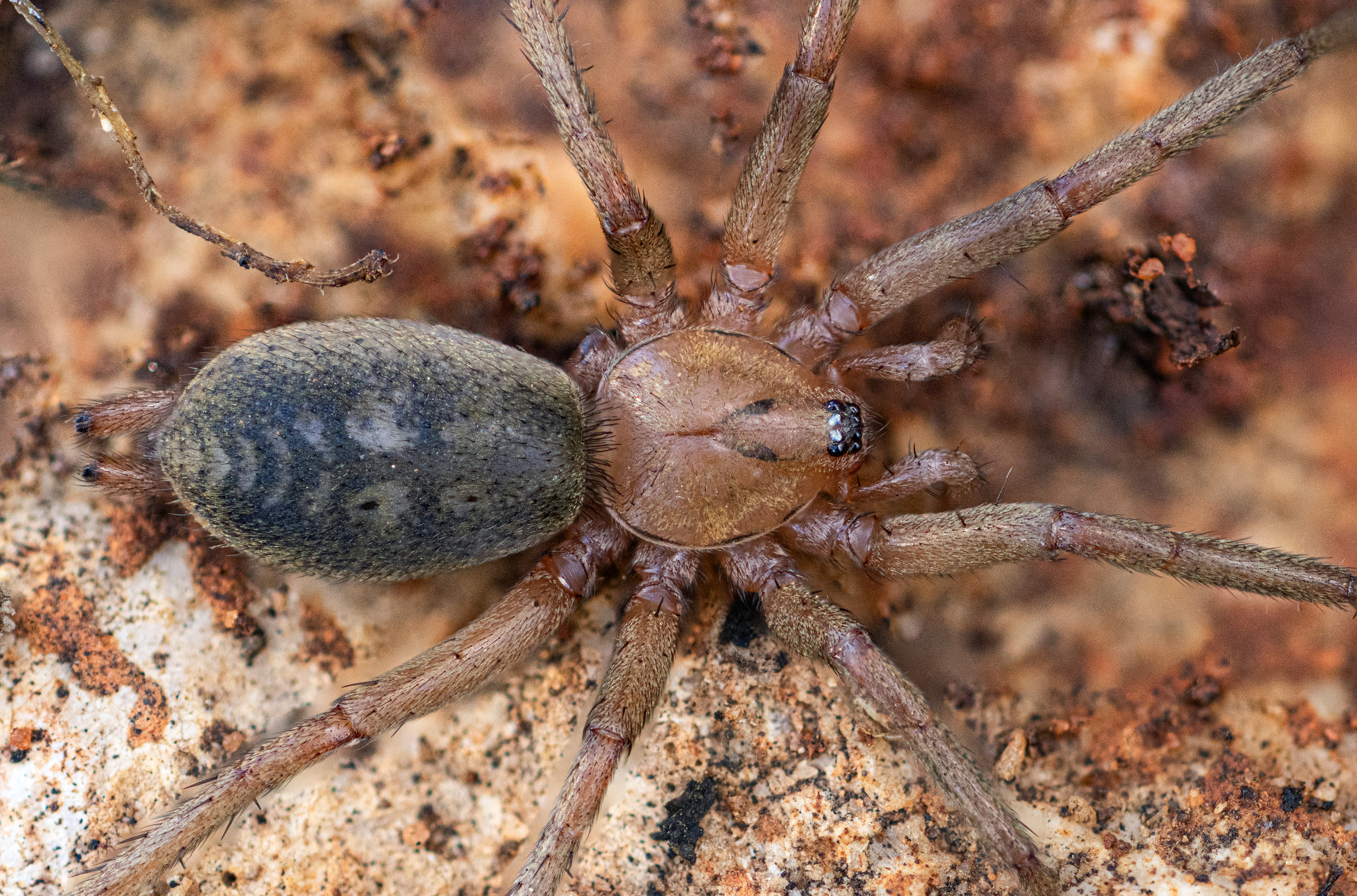
- P. simoni

Scientific classification
- Kingdom: Animalia
- Phylum: Arthropoda
- Subphylum: Chelicerata
- Class: Arachnida
- Order: Araneae
- Infraorder: Araneomorphae
- Family: Gnaphosidae
- Genus: Pterotricha; Kulczyński, 1903

Type species
- P. lentiginosa (C. L. Koch, 1837)

Species
- 39, see text

= Pterotricha =

Genus of spiders

Pterotricha is a genus of ground spiders that was first described by Władysław Kulczyński in 1903.

== Species ==
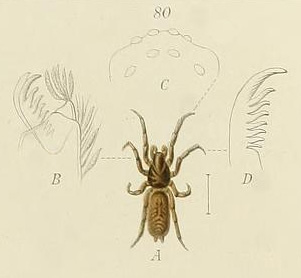
male P. saga

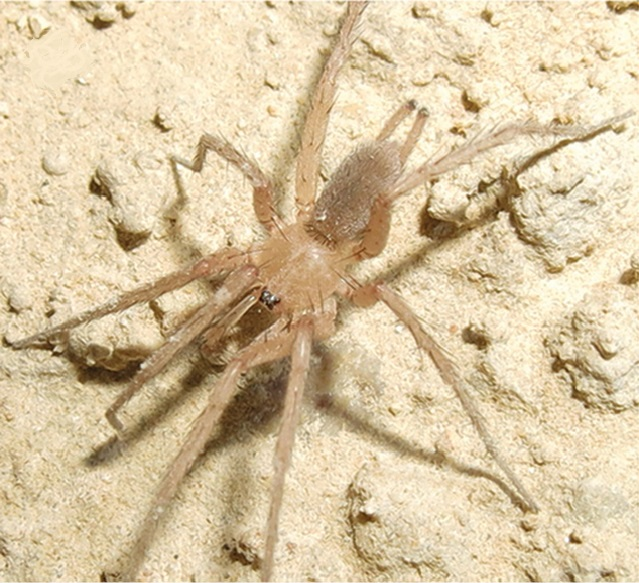
P. strandi

As of September 2025, this genus includes 39 species:

- Pterotricha algerica Dalmas, 1921 – Algeria, Libya
- Pterotricha arabica Zamani, 2018 – United Arab Emirates
- Pterotricha argentosa Charitonov, 1946 – Uzbekistan
- Pterotricha arzhantsevi Fomichev, Marusik & Koponen, 2018 – Iraq
- Pterotricha auris (Tucker, 1923) – Botswana, South Africa, Lesotho
- Pterotricha cambridgei (L. Koch, 1872) – Syria, Israel
- Pterotricha chazaliae (Simon, 1895) – Portugal, Mauritania, Morocco, Algeria, Libya, Israel
- Pterotricha conspersa (O. Pickard-Cambridge, 1872) – Libya, Egypt, Israel
- Pterotricha dalmasi Fage, 1929 – Algeria, Egypt, Sudan, Israel, Jordan, Saudi Arabia, United Arab Emirates, Iraq, Iran
- Pterotricha djibutensis Dalmas, 1921 – Somalia
- Pterotricha egens Denis, 1966 – Libya
- Pterotricha engediensis Levy, 1995 – Israel
- Pterotricha esyunini Zamani, 2018 – United Arab Emirates, Iraq
- Pterotricha insolita Dalmas, 1921 – Algeria
- Pterotricha kochi (O. Pickard-Cambridge, 1872) – Turkey, Cyprus, Lebanon, Syria, Israel
- Pterotricha kovblyuki Zamani & Marusik, 2018 – United Arab Emirates, Iraq, Iran
- Pterotricha lentiginosa (C. L. Koch, 1837) – Montenegro, Greece, Cyprus, Turkey (type species)
- Pterotricha lesserti Dalmas, 1921 – Turkey, Egypt, Israel, Saudi Arabia
- Pterotricha levantina Levy, 1995 – Israel
- Pterotricha lutata (O. Pickard-Cambridge, 1872) – Lebanon, Israel
- Pterotricha marginalis (Tucker, 1923) – South Africa
- Pterotricha mauritanica Denis, 1945 – Mauritania
- Pterotricha montana Zamani & Marusik, 2018 – Iran
- Pterotricha nadolnyi Zamani, 2018 – United Arab Emirates
- Pterotricha nomas (Thorell, 1875) – Russia (Europe)
- Pterotricha parasyriaca Levy, 1995 – Israel
- Pterotricha paupercula Denis, 1966 – Libya
- Pterotricha pavlovskyi Spassky, 1952 – Tajikistan
- Pterotricha procera (O. Pickard-Cambridge, 1874) – Egypt, Israel
- Pterotricha pseudoparasyriaca Nuruyeva & Huseynov, 2016 – Turkey, Azerbaijan, Iran
- Pterotricha quagga (Pavesi, 1884) – Tunisia
- Pterotricha saga (Dönitz & Strand, 1906) – Japan
- Pterotricha schaefferi (Audouin, 1826) – Morocco, Libya, Egypt, Sudan, Ethiopia, Cyprus, Israel
- Pterotricha simoni Dalmas, 1921 – Portugal, Spain
- Pterotricha somaliensis Dalmas, 1921 – Somalia
- Pterotricha stevensi Zamani, 2018 – United Arab Emirates
- Pterotricha strandi Spassky, 1936 – Iraq, Iran, Turkmenistan, Afghanistan, India
- Pterotricha syriaca Dalmas, 1921 – Syria
- Pterotricha vicina Dalmas, 1921 – Algeria, Libya
