= Red Data Book of Uzbekistan =

Official list of threatened species of Uzbekistan

The Red Data Book of the Republic of Uzbekistan
- Cover of the 5th edition (2019). Plants
- Original title: Oʻzbekiston Respublikasining Qizil kitobi
- Language: Uzbek, Russian
- Subject: Rare and endangered species of Uzbekistan
- Publisher: Fan (1983–84); Chinor ENK (1998–2019)
- Publication date: 1983–2019 (five editions)
- Publication place: Uzbekistan
- Media type: Print, PDF

The Red Data Book of the Republic of Uzbekistan (Uzbek: Oʻzbekiston Respublikasining Qizil kitobi; Russian: Красная книга Республики Узбекистан) is the official state publication listing rare and endangered animal and plant species occurring in Uzbekistan and protected by the state. The Red Data Book provides information on the species' conservation status, distribution, population trends, habitats, threats and conservation measures. The Red Data Book is a document of legal importance, and species included in it are protected under the legislation of Uzbekistan.

The Red Data Book is maintained and administered by the National Committee on Ecology and Climate Change of the Republic of Uzbekistan, while the Academy of Sciences of the Republic of Uzbekistan is responsible for its scientific preparation. The print book is published by Chinor ENK. The publication consists of two volumes, Plants and Animals. Species accounts are provided in Uzbek and Russian, with brief summaries in English. A digital version is available on the website of the National Committee on Ecology and Climate Change.

First published in two volumes in 1983 and 1984, the Red Data Book has undergone five editions. As of October 2026, the fifth edition, published in 2019, remains the latest. It lists 314 plant species and 203 animal species, or 206 when subspecies are counted. Preparation of the sixth edition is underway.

== History ==
=== Background ===
The first Red Data Book in the world was published by the International Union for Conservation of Nature (IUCN) in 1966. It gave a strong impetus for the creation of national Red Data Books worldwide. The Red Data Book of the USSR was established in 1974 and published in 1978. It provided a basis for the subsequent development of Red Data Books in the individual Soviet republics, including Uzbek SSR.

=== First edition: the Red Data Book of Uzbek SSR (1983, 1984) ===
The first edition of the Red Data Book of Uzbekistan, published as the Red Data Book of the Uzbek SSR. Volume 2: Plants (1984)

The Red Data Book of the Uzbek SSR was established in 1978. Its founding documents were Resolution No. 564 of the Council of Ministers of the Uzbek SSR, dated 27 September 1978; Resolution No. 135 of the Presidium of the Academy of Sciences of the Uzbek SSR, dated 24 November 1978; and Resolution No. 2 of the Bureau of the Academy’s Scientific Council on the Biosphere Problem, dated 6 July 1979. The Regulations on the preparation of the Red Data Book of the Uzbek SSR, adopted in 1979, included a list of species occurring in Uzbekistan that were included in the Red Data Book of the USSR: 40 plant species and 52 animal species, comprising 23 mammals, 26 birds, and 3 reptiles. This list served as the basis for selecting species for the first Uzbek SSR edition.

The first volume, Vertebrates, was published in 1983. The full printed title of the book was: Red Data Book of Uzbek SSR. Rare and Endangered Species of Animals and Plants. Volume 1. Vertebrates. It was published under the general editorship of Obid Sodiqov, President of the Academy of Sciences of the Uzbek SSR, with Tesha Zohidov as responsible editor and G. S. Sultanov and D. Yu. Kashkarov as deputy responsible editors. The volume listed 63 vertebrate species and subspecies. The print run was 10,000 copies.

The second volume, Plants, followed in 1984 and listed 163 plant species. Like the first volume, Plants was published under the general editorship of Obid Sodiqov, with Makhamat Nabiev as responsible editor. The volume introduced extinction-risk categories based on those of the IUCN, marking their first use in Uzbekistan’s Red Data Book. The print run was 10,000 copies.

=== Second edition: the Red Data Book of Uzbekistan (1998, 2003) ===
Red Data Book of Uzbekistan. Volume I: Plants (1998)

The first volume of the Red Data Book of independent Uzbekistan, Plants, was published in 1998. The volume was published under the general editorship of Uktam Pratov, former director of the Institute of Botany. It was prepared for publication by the Academy of Sciences and the State Committee for Nature Protection. The volume listed 301 plant species: 163 carried over from the Red Data Book of the Uzbek SSR and 138 newly added species. For the first time, species accounts were published in both Uzbek and Russian, a format retained in subsequent editions. The print run was 2,000 copies.

The second volume, Animals, was published in 2003, following preparation by the Academy of Sciences and the State Committee for Nature Protection. The volume was published under the general editorship of Jaloliddin Azimov. It listed 182 animal species (or 189 taxa, when subspecies are counted). Invertebrates were included in the Red Data Book of Uzbekistan for the first time. Species were assessed using the IUCN Red List Categories and Criteria, version 3.1, published in 2001.

=== Third edition (2006) ===
Title page of the 2006 edition of the Red Data Book of Uzbekistan. Volume 2: Animals

The third edition of the Red Data Book of Uzbekistan was published in 2006 as a revised and supplemented edition. (Note: The 2006 edition was labelled “2nd revised and supplemented”, but the National Committee on Ecology and Climate Change of the Republic of Uzbekistan now considers it the third edition, counting from the first Soviet-era edition published in 1983–1984.) It comprised two volumes: Plants and Fungi and Animals.

The Plants and Fungi volume listed 305 species, including 302 plant species and 3 fungal species. Compared with the 1998 edition, nine previously listed plant species were removed following the discovery of additional populations, while ten newly recognized threatened species were added. The number of listed plant species therefore increased from 301 to 302. The volume was published under the general editorship of Uktam Pratov. Fungi were included in the Red Data Book of Uzbekistan for the first time. The print run was 1,000 copies.

The Animals volume listed 182 animal species. When recognized subspecies are counted, the total was 189 taxa. The volume was published under the editorship of Jaloliddin Azimov, with B. B. Alikhanov and E. Sh. Shernazarov as deputy editors-in-chief. The print run was 1,000 copies.

The edition was published as part of the joint UNDP–Government of Uzbekistan programme “Support for the Implementation of the Action Plan for the Country Programme in the Field of Environment and Energy”.

=== Fourth edition (2009) ===
The fourth edition of the Red Data Book of Uzbekistan was published in 2009 in two volumes, Plants and Fungi and Animals. It was officially presented by the State Committee for Nature Protection and the ecological publishing house Chinor ENK in May 2011.

The Plants and Fungi volume listed 321 plant species and 3 fungal species. Compared with the previous edition, 49 species were excluded, partly because of expanded distribution ranges and population recovery, while 71 newly recognized rare species were added. The revisions were based on eight years of field studies. The volume was published under the general editorship of Uktam Pratov and Furkat Khassanov.

The Animals volume was published under the general editorship of Jaloliddin Azimov. It listed 181 animal species (or 188 species and subspecies, when subspecies are counted). The print run was 1,000 copies.

=== Fifth edition (2019) ===
Cover of the fifth edition of the Red Data Book of the Republic of Uzbekistan. Volume II: Animals (2019)

The fifth edition of the Red Data Book of Uzbekistan was presented in December 2019 at the Institute of Botany of the Academy of Sciences of the Republic of Uzbekistan. The presentation was organized by the State Committee of the Republic of Uzbekistan for Ecology and Environmental Protection. The updated edition was prepared by the Academy’s Institutes of Botany and Zoology.

The first volume was named solely Plants, since no fungal species were included in the publication. It listed 314 plant species and subspecies and was published under the general editorship of Furkat Khassanov. The print run was 1,000 copies.

The Animals volume was published under the general editorship of Jaloliddin Azimov. It listed 203 animal species (or 206 taxa, when subspecies are counted). The print run was 5,000 copies.

The fifth edition was the first edition of the Red Data Book of Uzbekistan to be made freely available online in PDF format through the website of the State Committee for Ecology and Environmental Protection.

=== Sixth edition (in preparation) ===
As of October 2026, preparation for the sixth edition is underway. On 1 November 2024, the Ministry of Ecology, Environmental Protection and Climate Change of the Republic of Uzbekistan published a preliminary list of species proposed for inclusion. The list contains 317 plant species and 189 animal species and subspecies.

=== Species and subspecies listed in the Red Data Book of Uzbekistan, by edition ===
Category	I edition (1983, 1984)	II edition (1998, 2003)	III edition (2006)	IV edition (2009)	V edition (2019)	VI edition (preliminary list)
Animals	63	189	189	188	206	189
Vertebrates	63	109	109	109	123	125
Mammals	22	24	24	24	32	34
Birds	31	51	51	51	52	50
Reptiles	5	16	16	16	21	23
Fish	5	18	18	18	18	18
Invertebrates	0	80	80	79	83	64
Insects	0	55	55	55	59	44
Arachnids	0	1	1	1	1	1
Crustaceans	0	6	6	5	6	6
Molluscs	0	15	15	15	14	11
Annelids	0	3	3	3	3	2
Plants	163	301	302	321	314	317
Fungi	0	0	3	3	0	0

- The totals include subspecies counted separately. Consequently, the number of distinct species may be lower where a species is represented in Uzbekistan by more than one listed subspecies.

== Format and content ==
=== Format of the book ===
The language of publication for the first edition, issued in the USSR (1983, 1984), was Russian. All subsequent editions were published in both Uzbek and Russian, featuring a brief English summary for each species account. The prefaces in all editions were published in Uzbek, Russian and English. While the first edition was issued by the Fan publishing house, all subsequent editions were published by Chinor ENK.

Each species account in the Red Data Book follows a standardized structure, featuring its scientific and common names, conservation status, physical description, and distribution, alongside detailed data on its habitat, abundance, biology, limiting factors, cultivation or captive breeding status, existing conservation measures, and key bibliographic sources. Accounts are accompanied by a scientific illustration and a distribution map showing recorded occurrences in Uzbekistan; some also contain photographs. Most accounts occupy one page, while longer ones may extend to two pages.

=== Extinction-risk categories ===
The latest, fifth edition of the Red Data Book (2019) uses national extinction-risk categories that are broadly based on the classification system of the International Union for Conservation of Nature (IUCN). The classification differs between the Plants and Animals volumes. The Plants volume uses four numerical categories reflecting different levels of rarity and extinction risk. The Animals volume uses a more explicit system based on the IUCN Red List Categories and Criteria, version 3.1 (2001), combining the traditional numerical categories used in the countries of the former Soviet Union with international IUCN abbreviations. In the Animals volume, Categories 0–3 represent levels of extinction risk, whereas Category 4 (Data Deficient) indicates insufficient information to assess extinction risk.

==== Plants ====
Category		Meaning
Index	Title	Meaning
0	Extinct or probably extinct	Species that have not been recorded for several years but may survive in inaccessible locations or in cultivation.
1	On the verge of extinction	Species whose abundance is close to a critical level and which are close to extinction.
2	Rare	Species that are not under an immediate threat of extinction but occur in such small numbers or in such restricted or specialized habitats that they may rapidly disappear. Careful monitoring is required.
3	Declining in numbers	Species whose population size and range have decreased over a period of time as a result of natural processes, human intervention, or both. Regular assessment of their status is required.

==== Animals ====
Category			Meaning
Index	Title	Subcategories	Meaning
0	Extinct	Regionally Extinct (EX); Regionally Extinct in the Wild (EW)	Species that are extinct in Uzbekistan (Regionally Extinct, EX) or extinct in the wild in Uzbekistan (Regionally Extinct in the Wild, EW). Some species in this category may also be globally extinct (IUCN:EX) or extinct in the wild globally (IUCN:EW).
1	Threatened	Critically Endangered (CR); Endangered (EN)	Species facing a very high or high risk of extinction in the wild, corresponding to Critically Endangered (CR) or Endangered (EN).
2	Vulnerable	Vulnerable: Declining (VU:D); Vulnerable: Naturally Rare (VU:R)	Species facing a moderate risk of extinction in the wild. The category includes Vulnerable: Declining (VU:D) for species with sharply declining or strongly fluctuating population parameters (based on IUCN VU category under criteria A, B, C and/or E), and Vulnerable: Naturally Rare (VU:R) for species with naturally restricted population parameters (based on IUCN VU category under criteria D and E).
3	Near Threatened	Near Threatened (NT)	Species whose population parameters are relatively far from critical levels but may approach them in the future, creating a potential risk of extinction in the wild. The practical conservation status of these species is treated as equivalent to Vulnerable.
4	Data Deficient	Data Deficient (DD)	Species for which available information is inadequate to assess the risk of extinction. This is not an extinction-risk category; it indicates that additional information is needed and that future research may allow the species to be assigned to a threat category.

== Legal status and administration ==
The legal framework governing the Red Data Book is established primarily by two legal acts: Decision No. 20 of the State Committee for Nature Protection of 14 July 2016, which approved the Regulation on the Red Data Book of the Republic of Uzbekistan, and Cabinet of Ministers Resolution No. 1034 of 19 December 2018, On measures to organize the preparation, publication, and maintenance of the Red Data Book of the Republic of Uzbekistan. Both acts have subsequently been amended.

The 2016 regulation, as amended, defines the Red Data Book's structure, content, and administration. It provides for two volumes, Plants and Fungi and Animals, and specifies the information recorded for each listed species or subspecies, including its name, conservation status, distribution, habitat, population size and trends, limiting factors, and conservation measures. The book is maintained as an electronic database that is periodically updated and published. It provides a basis for developing and implementing conservation programmes, and the regulation prohibits activities that may cause listed species to become extinct, reduce their numbers, or damage their habitats.

Under the 2016 regulation as amended, the National Committee on Ecology and Climate Change of the Republic of Uzbekistan administers the Red Data Book in cooperation with the Academy of Sciences and the National University of Uzbekistan. The Committee maintains the database using information provided by the Academy of Sciences. The regulation also assigns the Committee and the Academy joint responsibility for decisions on the inclusion and removal of species, following consideration by the interdepartmental commission and in coordination with other interested organizations.

The 2018 resolution, as amended, establishes procedures for preparing, publishing, and maintaining the Red Data Book, including the evaluation of proposals to add or remove species and subspecies or change their conservation status. Proposals may be submitted by individuals and legal entities, regardless of their organizational and legal form. The National Committee on Ecology and Climate Change reviews proposals and refers them to the Institute of Zoology and/or the Institute of Botany of the Academy of Sciences of the Republic of Uzbekistan, as well as the Research Institute of Environmental and Nature Protection Technologies, for scientific assessment and expert conclusions. The Interdepartmental Commission for the Conservation of Rare and Endangered Animals and Plants decides on the inclusion or removal of species and subspecies or changes to their conservation status, while the list is approved by the head of the relevant Cabinet of Ministers complex. The resolution assigns responsibility for preparing the book for publication to the Academy of Sciences and for organizing its publication to the state body responsible for ecology, currently the National Committee on Ecology and Climate Change of the Republic of Uzbekistan. Amendments adopted on 30 December 2024 and effective from 11 April 2025 provide for the Red Data Book to be published in electronic and printed formats at least once every ten years.

The legal protection of species listed in the Red Data Book is governed by the Law of the Republic of Uzbekistan On the Protection and Use of Wildlife and the Law On the Protection and Use of the Plant World, both adopted on 26 December 1997 and revised in 2016. These laws establish specific protections for rare and endangered animal and plant species and their habitats. The wildlife law prohibits actions that could cause the death of rare and endangered animals, reduce their populations or damage their habitats, and regulates the removal of listed animals from their natural habitats through a permit procedure. The plant-world law prohibits the harvesting of rare and endangered plants listed in the Red Data Book and permits their use, trade and export only in exceptional cases under special authorization. Under Article 202 of the Criminal Code of the Republic of Uzbekistan, destruction of species listed in the Red Data Book is punishable by a fine of 400 to 600 basic calculation units, restriction of freedom for three to five years, or imprisonment for three to seven years. As of October 2026 one basic calculation unit is 440,000 UZS, so the fine is roughly US$14,700–22,000. Compensating the damage at five times its assessed amount removes the restriction-of-freedom and imprisonment penalties, subject to the exceptions specified by law.

The Law On Protected Natural Areas, adopted on 3 December 2004, provides an additional mechanism for conserving rare and endangered species through the establishment and regulation of protected areas. It allows access to parts of these territories to be restricted or prohibited to protect threatened species and their habitats, and establishes strict protection regimes for nature reserves and other categories of protected areas.
