= Central Asian northern desert =

Ecoregion in Kazakhstan and Uzbekistan

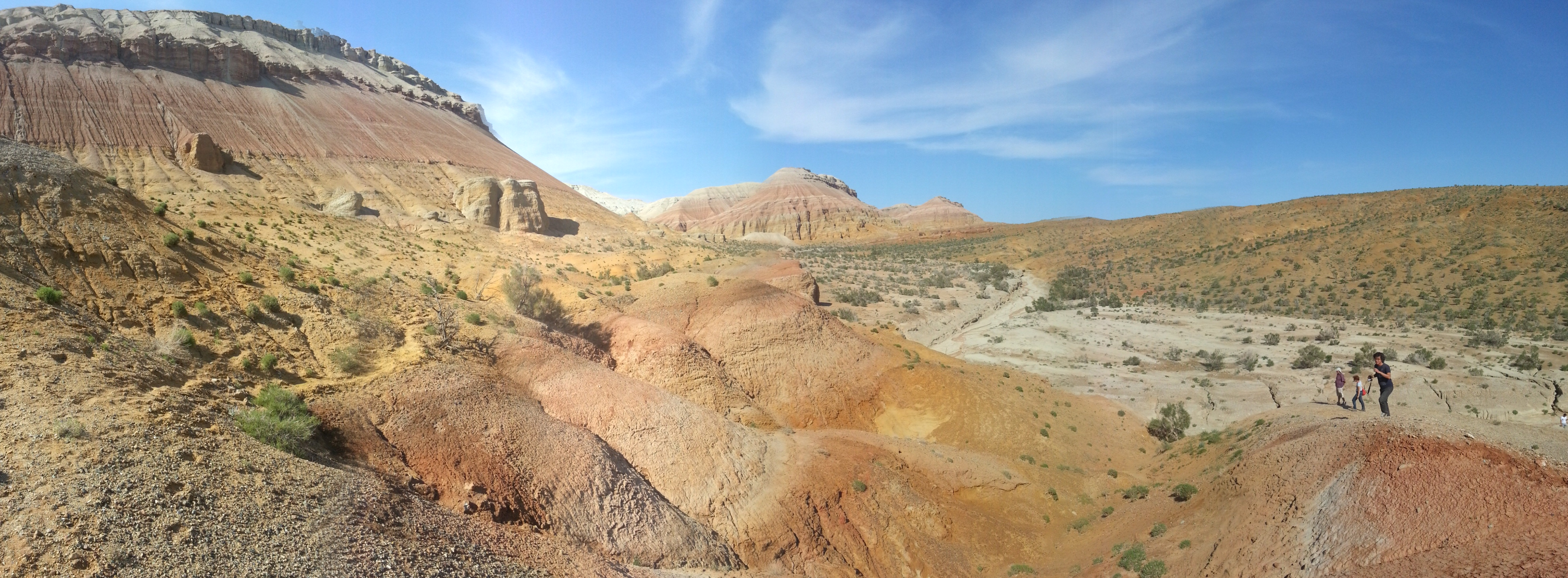
- Altyn Emel National Park, Kazakhstan

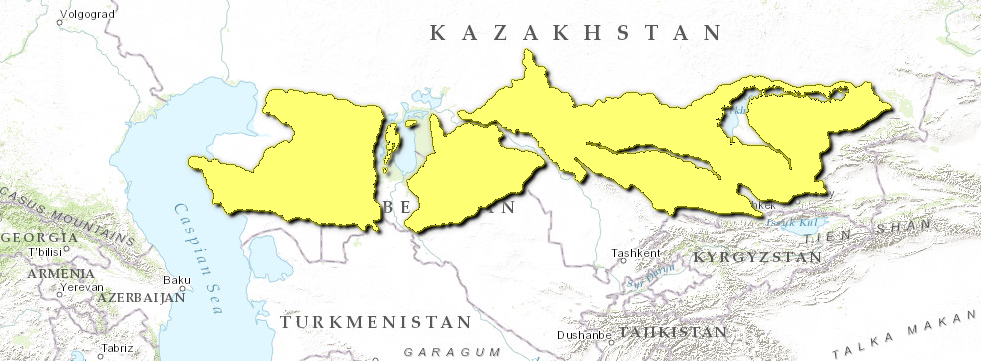
- Ecoregion territory (in yellow)

Ecology
- Realm: Palearctic
- Biome: Deserts and xeric shrublands

Geography
- Area: 663,000 km^{2} (256,000 sq mi)
- Country: Kazakhstan, Uzbekistan, Kyrgyzstan

Conservation
- Conservation status: Vulnerable
- Global 200: 134

The Central Asian northern desert is an ecoregion in the deserts and xeric shrublands biome, located in the Central Asian countries of Kazakhstan and Uzbekistan. The annual precipitation ranges from 100 to 150 mm (4 to 6 in), the winters are cold at −10 to −15 °C (14 to 5 °F) and the summers hot at around 25 °C (77 °F). There are a range of habitat types including salt flats, clay desert, rocky desert and some sand desert. The vegetation consists of scanty xeric shrubs including Artemisia and Salsola. The fauna is varied, as well as mammals and birds, there are a large number of reptiles and many species of invertebrate. Some protected areas are included in this ecoregion but other parts are being degraded by conversion to farmland, overgrazing and poaching.

== Setting ==
The Central Asian northern desert occupies southern Kazakhstan and most of Uzbekistan. This ecoregion experiences a typical cold desert climate; January mean temperatures range from −10 °C (14 °F) to −15 °C (5 °F), while July means range from 24 °C (75 °F) to 26 °C (79 °F). On average, precipitation ranges from 100 millimetres (3.9 in) to 150 millimetres (5.9 in) annually. The topography of this ecoregion is varied, featuring salty "solonchak" deserts with a great number of salt flats, clay deserts, rocky deserts, and a small area of sandy desert in the southern portion of the region.

== Flora ==
The vegetation of this ecoregion is dominated by shrubs and semi-shrubs, with a variety of different species adapted to the different soil types found in it. Clay deserts support communities of Anabasis salsa, Salsola orientalis, and the Artemisia species A. terrae albae, A. turanica, and A. gurganica. The stony deserts support mainly Salsola arbusculae formis and Nanophyton erinaceum, while the "solonchaks" support the semi-shrubs Ceratoides papposa, Artemisia terrae albae', var. massagetovii, A. santolina, and A. songarica, shrubs such as Calligonum aphyllum, Ephedra lomatolepis as well as grasses such as Agropyron fragile.

== Fauna ==
Mammals of the Central Asian northern desert include the long-eared hedgehog (Hemiechinus auritus), tolai hare (lepus tolai), various species of gerbil and jerboa, saiga antelope (Saiga tatarica), steppe polecat (Mustela eversmanni), goitered gazelle (Gazella subgutturosa ), onager (Equus hemonius) and suslik (Spermophilus spp.).

Birds of this ecoregion include wheatears (Oenanthe isabellina, O. deserti), desert warbler (Sylvia nana), brown-necked raven (Corvus ruficollis), the endangered houbara bustard (Chlamydotis undulata), black-bellied sandgrouse (Pterocles orientalis), golden eagle (Aquila chrysaetos), steppe eagle (Aquila rapax), Egyptian vulture (Neophron percnopterus), and the saker falcon (Falco cherrug).

Numerous reptiles can be found in this ecoregion, including numerous Agama lizards, Rustamov's skink gekko (Teratoscincus scincus rustamovi), Chernov's snake-lizard (Ophimorus chernovi), Ferghana sand lizard (Eremias scripta pherganensis), desert monitor (Varanus griseus) and the Central Asian cobra (Naja oxiana).

The invertebrate fauna of this ecoregion is quite rich, especially in the sandy deserts, supporting a variety of grasshoppers, beetles, butterflies, termites and ants.

== Conservation status and threats ==
The conservation status of this ecoregion is listed as "vulnerable". The primary factors jeopardizing its integrity include the transformation of natural habitats into agricultural land, excessive hunting and poaching activities, and the utilization of plants for purposes such as firewood and silk production. Protected areas include the Barsa-Kelmes Nature Reserve on an island in the Aral Sea, the Kaplankyr reserve, the Ustyurt reserve, and the Altyn-Emel National Park in Kazakhstan.
