= Central Asian riparian woodlands =

Ecoregion in Central Asia

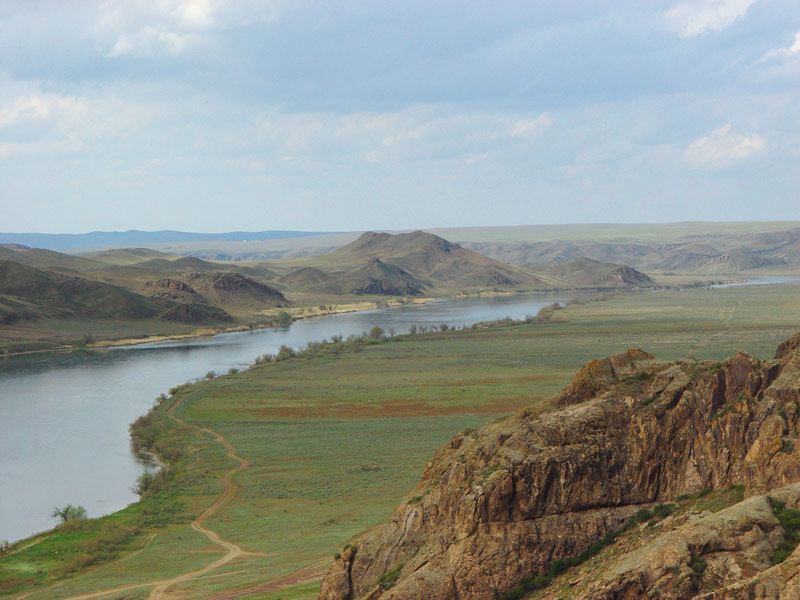
- Ili River, in Kazakhstan

- Ecoregion territory (in purple)

Ecology
- Realm: Palearctic
- Biome: Deserts and xeric shrublands

Geography
- Area: 88,578 km^{2} (34,200 mi^{2})
- Country: Kazakhstan, Uzbekistan, Turkmenistan, Tajikistan
- Coordinates: 43°N 59°E

The Central Asian riparian woodlands ecoregion (WWF ID: PA1311) is spread out across the deserts and plains of central Asia between the Aral Sea and the mountains 2,000 kilometres (1,200 mi) to the east. The long narrow components of the ecoregion follow the large rivers fed by snowmelt, and provide critical habitat for migratory birds as they travel through the arid region. The vegetation is referred to as tugai, characterized by low tangles of trees and brush along the edges of the rivers and associated wetlands, and fed by groundwater instead of precipitation.

== Location and description ==
Major river systems that support habitat for this ecoregion include:

- The Syr Darya (River), which flows westward for over 2,200 kilometres (1,400 mi) from the Tian Shan Mountains across eastern Uzbekistan and southern Kazakhstan to the Aral Sea.
- The Amu Darya (River), which runs parallel to and south of the Syr Darya; the Amu Darya flows out of Afghanistan and Tajikistan northwest along the border of Uzbekistan and Turkmenistan.
- The Murghab and Tejen Rivers that run across, and disappear into, the Karakum Desert of southeastern Turkmenistan.
- The Ili River, which flows 1,500 km west from the Tian Shan Mountains of China to Lake Balkhash in southeast Kazakhstan.
- The Zeravshan River, which rises on the edge of the Pamir Mountains in Tajikistan, and flows west towards the Amu Darya before disappearing in the desert.
- The Vakhsh River, which flows across the middle of Tajikistan before emptying into the Amu Darya at the border with Afghanistan.
- The Naryn River, which flows from the Tian Shan Mountains of Kyrgyzstan to the Syr Darya River in Uzbekistan.

== Climate ==
The climate in the surrounding region is Cold desert climate (Köppen climate classification (BWk)). This climate features hot desert conditions in the summer, but cooler than hot deserts. Winters are cold and dry. At least one month averages below 0 °C (32 °F). The snowmelt from nearby mountains produces flooding in spring through early summer, which is then followed by extremely arid conditions and an increase in soil salinity.

== Flora and fauna ==
The woodlands of this ecoregion are a specialized complex of woody-shrubby vegetation known as tugai, which adapts to the extreme continental climate that experiences very hot summers and very cold winters. For all practical purposes there are no old-growth forests. Trees are typically poplars, willows, dzhidda (a type of silverberry, Elaeagnus oxycarpa), and Tamarix. Underbrush includes sea-buckthorn (Hippophae rhamnoides), barberry (Berberis), briar roses, honeysuckle, and Cotoneaster. Reeds and cattails are found extensively in the wetlands. The forest complexes of the ecoregion are often patchy, interspersed with steppe and swamp meadows.

== Protected areas ==
Very little of this ecoregion is protected, by some estimates less than 2%. Officially protected areas include:

- Tigrovaya Balka Nature Reserve, located where the Vakhsh River meets the Panj River to form the Amu Darya.
- Badai Tugai Nature Reserve, a part of the Lower Amu Darya Biosphere Reserve
