= List of reptiles of Afghanistan =

This is a list of reptiles of Afghanistan.

There are 111 species of reptiles in Afghanistan.

== Testudines ==
=== Testudinidae ===
- Testudo
  - Testudo horsfieldii (Russian tortoise)

== Squamata ==
=== Non-serpent squamates ===
==== Gekkonidae ====
- Agamura
  - Agamura persica (Persian spider gecko)
- Alsophylax
  - Alsophylax laevis (southern even-fingered gecko)
  - Alsophylax pipiens (even-fingered gecko)
- Bunopus
  - Bunopus tuberculatus (Arabian desert gecko)
- Asiocolotes
  - Asiocolotes levitoni
- Crossobamon
  - Crossobamon eversmanni (comb-toed gecko)
- Cyrtopodion
  - Cyrtopodion caspium (Caspain thin-toed gecko)
  - Cyrtopodion fedtschenkoi (Turkestan thin-toed gecko)
  - Cyrtopodion longipes (long-legged thin-toed gecko)
  - Cyrtopodion scabrum (rough-tailed gecko)
  - Cyrtopodion turcmenicum
  - Cyrtopodion voraginosum (southwest thin-toed gecko)
  - Cyrtopodion watsoni (Pakistani thin-toed gecko)
- Eublepharis
  - Eublepharis macularius (leopard gecko)
- Hemidactylus
  - Hemidactylus flaviviridis (yellow-belly gecko)
- Teratoscincus
  - Teratoscincus bedriagai (Bedriaga's wonder gecko)
  - Teratoscincus microlepis (small-scaled wonder gecko)
  - Teratoscincus scincus (common wonder gecko)

==== Agamidae ====
- Calotes
  - Calotes versicolor (oriental garden lizard)
- Paralaudakia
  - Paralaudakia badakhshana (Badakhshana rock agama)
  - Paralaudakia caucasia (Caucasian agama)
  - Paralaudakia erythrogaster (redbelly rock agama)
  - Paralaudakia himalayana (Himalayan agama)
  - Paralaudakia lehmanni (Turkestan rock agama)
  - Paralaudakia microlepis (smallscaled rock agama)
- Laudakia
  - Laudakia agrorensis (Agror agama)
  - Laudakia nupta
  - Laudakia nuristanica (Leviton's rock agama)
  - Laudakia tuberculata (tuberculated agama)
- Phrynocephalus
  - Phrynocephalus clarkorum (Afghan toadhead agama)
  - Phrynocephalus euptilopus (Alcock's toadhead agama)
  - Phrynocephalus interscapularis (Lichtenstein's toadhead agama)
  - Phrynocephalus luteoguttatus (yellow-speckled toadhead agama)
  - Phrynocephalus maculatus (blacktail toadhead agama)
  - Phrynocephalus mystaceus (secret toadhead agama)
  - Phrynocephalus ornatus
  - Phrynocephalus raddei
  - Phrynocephalus reticulatus (reticulated toadhead agama)
  - Phrynocephalus scutellatus (gray toadhead agama)
- Trapelus
  - Trapelus agilis (brilliant ground agama)
  - Trapelus megalonyx (Afghan ground agama)
  - Trapelus ruderatus (Olivier's agama)
  - Trapelus sanguinolentus (steppe agama)
- Uromastyx
  - Uromastyx asmussi
  - Uromastyx hardwickii (Hardwicke's spiny-tailed lizard)

==== Anguidae ====
- Pseudopus
  - Pseudopus apodus (sheltopusik)

==== Scincidae ====
- Ablepharus
  - Ablepharus bivittatus (twin-striped skink)
  - Ablepharus grayanus (minor snake-eyed skink)
  - Ablepharus pannonicus (Asian snake-eyed skink)
- Eumeces
  - Eumeces blythianus (Blyth's skink)
  - Eumeces schneiderii (Schneider's skink)
- Eurylepis
  - Eurylepis taeniolata (ribbon-sided skink)
- Eutropis
  - Eutropis dissimilis (Indian three-banded skink)
- Ophiomorus
  - Ophiomorus brevipes (short-legged snake skink)
  - Ophiomorus chernovi (Chernov's snake skink)
  - Ophiomorus tridactylus (Indian sand-swimmer)
- Heremites
  - Heremites auratus (golden grass mabuya)

==== Lacertidae ====
- Acanthodactylus
  - Acanthodactylus blanfordii (Blanford's fringe-fingered lizard)
  - Acanthodactylus cantoris (Indian fringe-fingered lizard)
  - Acanthodactylus micropholis (yellowtail fringe-toed lizard)
- Eremias
  - Eremias acutirostris (point-snouted racerunner)
  - Eremias afghanistanica (Afghan racerunner)
  - Eremias aria
  - Eremias fasciata (Sistan racerunner)
  - Eremias grammica (reticulate racerunner)
  - Eremias lineolata (striped racerunner)
  - Eremias nigrocellata (black-ocellated racerunner)
  - Eremias persica (Persian racerunner)
  - Eremias regeli
  - Eremias scripta (sand racerunner)
  - Eremias velox (rapid racerunner)
- Mesalina
  - Mesalina guttulata (small-spotted lizard)
  - Mesalina watsonana (Persian long-tailed desert lizard)
- Ophisops
  - Ophisops jerdonii (Jerdon's cabrita)

==== Varanidae ====
- Varanus
  - Varanus bengalensis (Bengal monitor)
  - Varanus griseus (desert monitor)

=== Suborder Serpentes ===
==== Leptotyphlopidae ====
- Myriopholis
  - Myriopholis blanfordi (Blanford's worm snake)

==== Typhlopidae ====
- Typhlops
  - Typhlops vermicularis (European blind snake)

==== Boidae ====
- Eryx
  - Eryx elegans (elegant sand boa)
  - Eryx johnii (red sand boa)
  - Eryx miliaris (dwarf sand boa)

==== Colubridae ====
- Boiga
  - Boiga trigonata (Indian gamma snake)
- Elaphe
  - Elaphe dione (steppe rat snake)
- Fowlea
  - Fowlea piscator (checkered keelback)
- Hemorrhois
  - Hemorrhois ravergieri (spotted whip snake)
- Lycodon
  - Lycodon striatus (northern wolf snake)
- Lytorhynchus
  - Lytorhynchus maynardi (Maynard's longnose sand snake)
  - Lytorhynchus ridgewayi (Derafshi snake)
- Natrix
  - Natrix tessellata (dice snake)
- Oligodon
  - Oligodon taeniolatus (streaked kukri snake)
- Platyceps
  - Platyceps karelini (spotted desert racer)
  - Platyceps rhodorachis (common cliff racer)
  - Platyceps ventromaculatus (Hardwicke's rat snake)
- Psammophis
  - Psammophis leithii (Pakistani sand racer)
  - Psammophis lineolatus (steppe ribbon racer)
  - Psammophis schokari (Schokari sand racer)
- Pseudocyclophis
  - Pseudocyclophis persicus (dark-headed dwarf racer)
- Ptyas
  - Ptyas mucosa (Indian rat snake)
- Spalerosophis
  - Spalerosophis diadema (blotched diadem snake)
- Telescopus
  - Telescopus rhinopoma (Indian desert tiger snake)

==== Elapidae ====
- Bungarus
  - Bungarus caeruleus (common krait)
- Naja
  - Naja naja (Indian cobra)
  - Naja oxiana (Caspain cobra)

==== Viperidae ====
- Echis
  - Echis carinatus (saw-scaled viper)
- Eristicophis
  - Eristicophis macmahoni (Asian sand viper)
- Gloydius
  - Gloydius halys (Siberian pit viper)
  - Gloydius intermedius (Central Asian pit viper)
- Macrovipera
  - Macrovipera lebetinus (blunt-nosed viper)
- Pseudocerastes
  - Pseudocerastes persicus (Persian horned viper)
