= List of reptiles of Kazakhstan =

This list is extracted from the Reptile Database.

Stub form in simple alphabetical order by scientific name.

- Ablepharus alaicus (Elpatjevsky, 1901)
- Desert lidless skink, Ablepharus deserti Strauch, 1868
- Ablepharus eremchenkoi (Mirza et al., 2022)
- Even-fingered gecko, Alsophylax pipiens (Pallas, 1827)
- Smooth snake, Coronella austriaca Laurenti, 1768
- Comb-toed gecko, Crossobamon eversmanni (Wiegmann, 1834)
- Caspian whipsnake, Dolichopis caspius (Gmelin, 1789)
- Steppe rat snake, Elaphe dione (Pallas, 1773)
- Blotched snake, Elaphe sauromates (Pallas, 1811)
- European pond turtle, Emys orbicularis (Linnaeus, 1758)
- Steppe-runner, Eremias arguta (Pallas, 1773)
- Reticulate raceruner, Eremias grammica (Lichtenstein, 1823)
- Aralo-Caspian racerunner, Eremias intermedia (Strauch, 1876)
- Eremias lineolata (Nikolsky, 1897)
- Multi-ocellated racerunner, Eremias multiocellata Günther, 1872
- Kirghiz racerunner, Eremias nikolskii Nikolsky, 1905
- Eremias scripta (Strauch, 1867)
- Eremias velox (Pallas, 1771)
- Central Asian racerunner, Eremias vermiculata Blanford, 1875
- Dwarf sand boa, Eryx miliaris (Pallas, 1773)
- Tartar sand boa, Eryx tataricus (Lichtenstein, 1823)
- Gloydius halys (Pallas, 1776)
- Coin-marked snake, Hemorrhois nummifer (Reuss, 1834)
- Spotted whip snake, Hemorrhois ravergieri (Ménétries, 1832)
- Sand lizard, Lacerta agilis Linnaeus, 1758
- Blunt-nosed viper, Macrovipera lebetinus (Linnaeus, 1758)
- Grey thin-toed gecko, Mediodactylus russowii (Strauch, 1887)
- Grass snake, Natrix natrix (Linnaeus, 1758)
- Dice snake, Natrix tessellata (Laurenti, 1768)
- Slender racer, Orientocoluber spinalis (Peters, 1866)
- Spotted toadhead agama, Phrynocephalus guttatus (Gmelin, 1789)
- Sunwatcher toadhead agama, Phrynocephalus helioscopus (Pallas, 1771)
- Lichtenstein's toadhead agama, Phrynocephalus interscapularis Lichtenstein, 1856
- Secret toadhead agama, Phrynocephalus mystaceus (Pallas, 1776)
- Reticulated toadhead agama, Phrynocephalus reticulatus Eichwald, 1831
- Spotted desert racer, Platyceps karelini (Brandt, 1838)
- Common cliff racer, Platyceps rhodorachis (Jan, 1865)
- Steppe ribbon racer, Psammophis lineolatus (Brandt, 1838)
- Pallas's glass lizard, Pseudopus apodus (Pallas, 1775)
- Blotched diadem snake, Spalerosophis diadema (Schlegel, 1837)
- Caspian thin-toed gecko, Tenuidactylus caspius (Eichwald, 1831)
- Turkestan thin-toed gecko, Tenuidactylus fedtschenkoi (Strauch, 1887)
- Frog-eyed gecko, Teratoscincus scincus (Schlegel, 1858)
- Russian tortoise, Testudo horsfieldii Gray, 1844
- Steppe agama, Trapelus sanguinolentus (Pallas, 1814)
- Desert monitor, Varanus griseus (Daudin, 1803)
- Altai viper, Vipera altaica Tuniyev, Nilson & Andrén, 2010
- Common european viper, Vipera berus (Linnaeus, 1758)
- Vipera renardi (Christoph, 1861)
- Viviparous lizard, Zootoca vivipara (Lichtenstein, 1823)
