= List of reptiles of Mongolia =

This is a list of reptiles of Mongolia.

== Family Gekkonidae ==
- Kaspischer even-fingered gecko or squeaky pygmy gecko (Alsophylax pipiens)
- Yangihissar gecko (Tenuidactylus elongatus)
- Przewalski's wonder gecko or plate-tailed gecko (Teratoscincus przewalskii)

== Family Agamidae ==
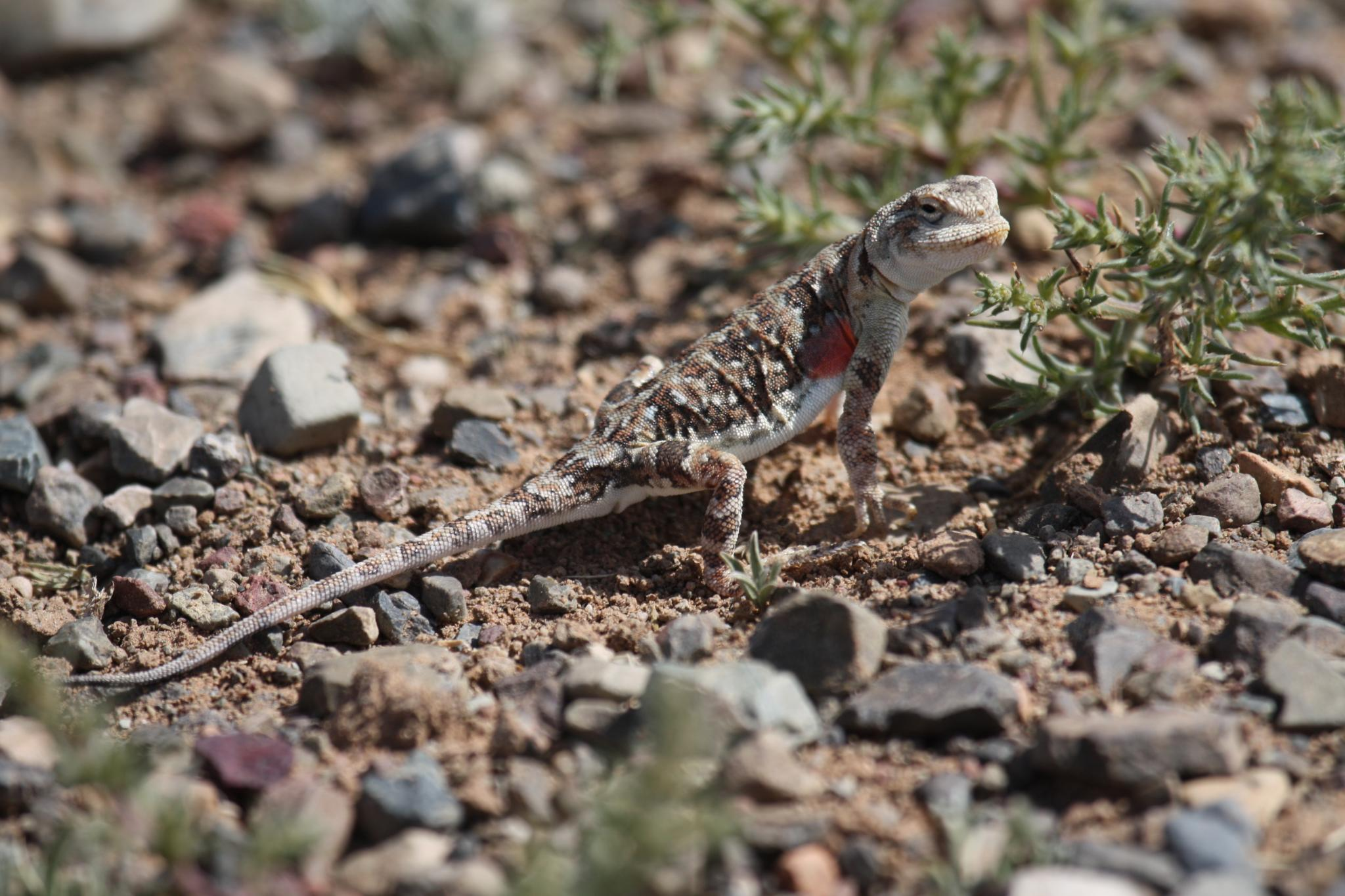
Phrynocephalus versicolor

- Mongolian agama or Mongolian rock agama (Paralaudakia stoliczkana)
- Sunwatcher toad-head agama (Phrynocephalus helioscopus)
- Tuva toad-head agama (Phrynocephalus versicolor)

== Family Lacertidae ==
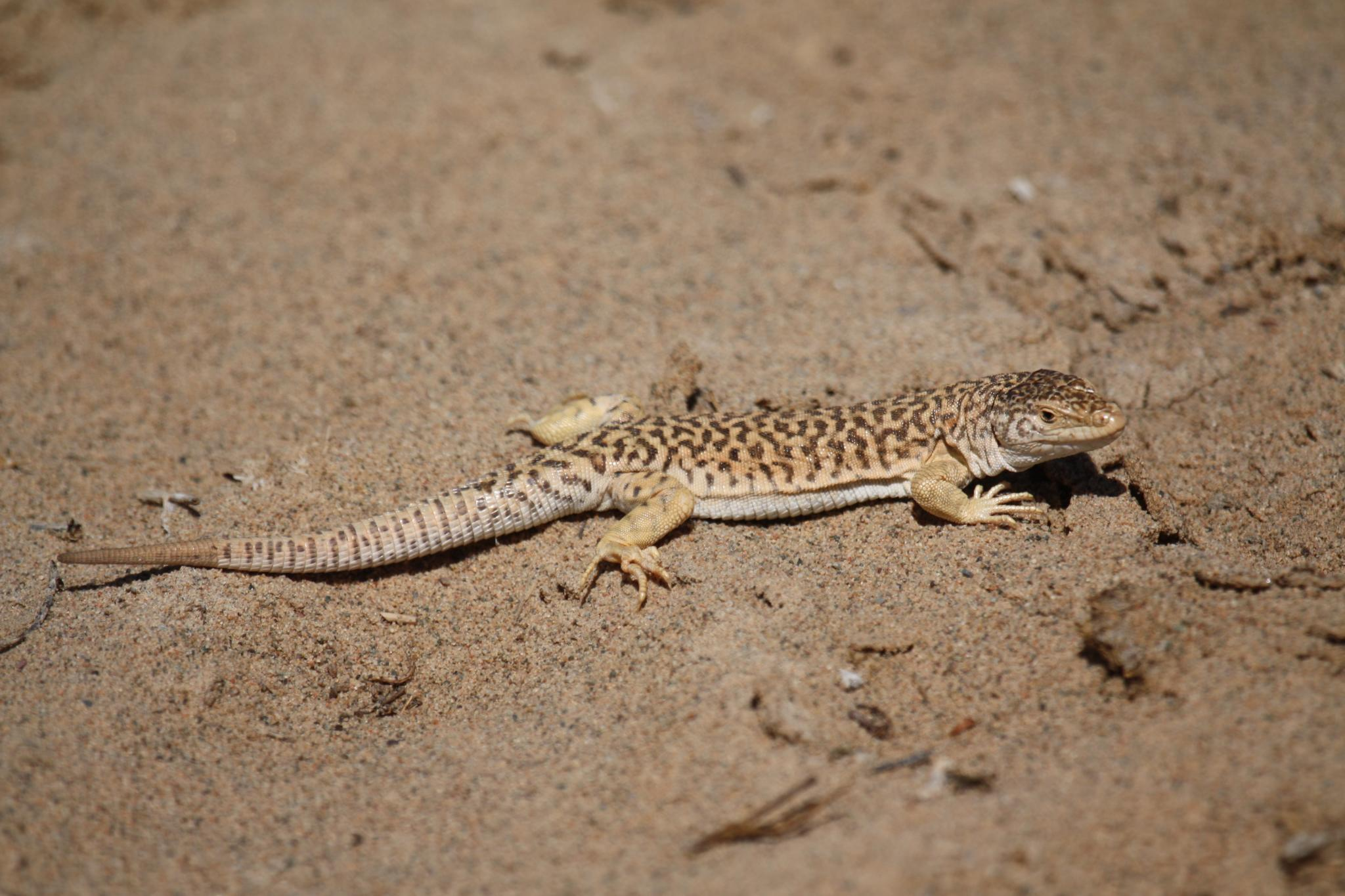
Eremias przewalskii

- Mongolian racerunner (Eremias argus)
- Stepperunner or arguta (Eremias arguta)
- Dzungarian racerunner (Eremias dzungarica)
- Multi-oscillated racerunner (Eremias multiocellata)
- Gobi racerunner (Eremias przewalskii)
- Variegated racerunner (Eremias vermiculata)
- Sand lizard (Lacerta agilis)
- Viviparous lizard or common lizard (Zootoca vivipara)

== Family Boidae ==
- Tatary sand boa (Eryx tataricus)

== Family Colubridae ==
- Slender racer (Orientocoluber spinalis)
- Steppes rat snake, Dione snake or Pallas' coluber (Elaphe dione)
- Amur rat snake, great black snake, Manchurian black, Siberian rat snake or Russian rat snake (Elaphe schrenckii)
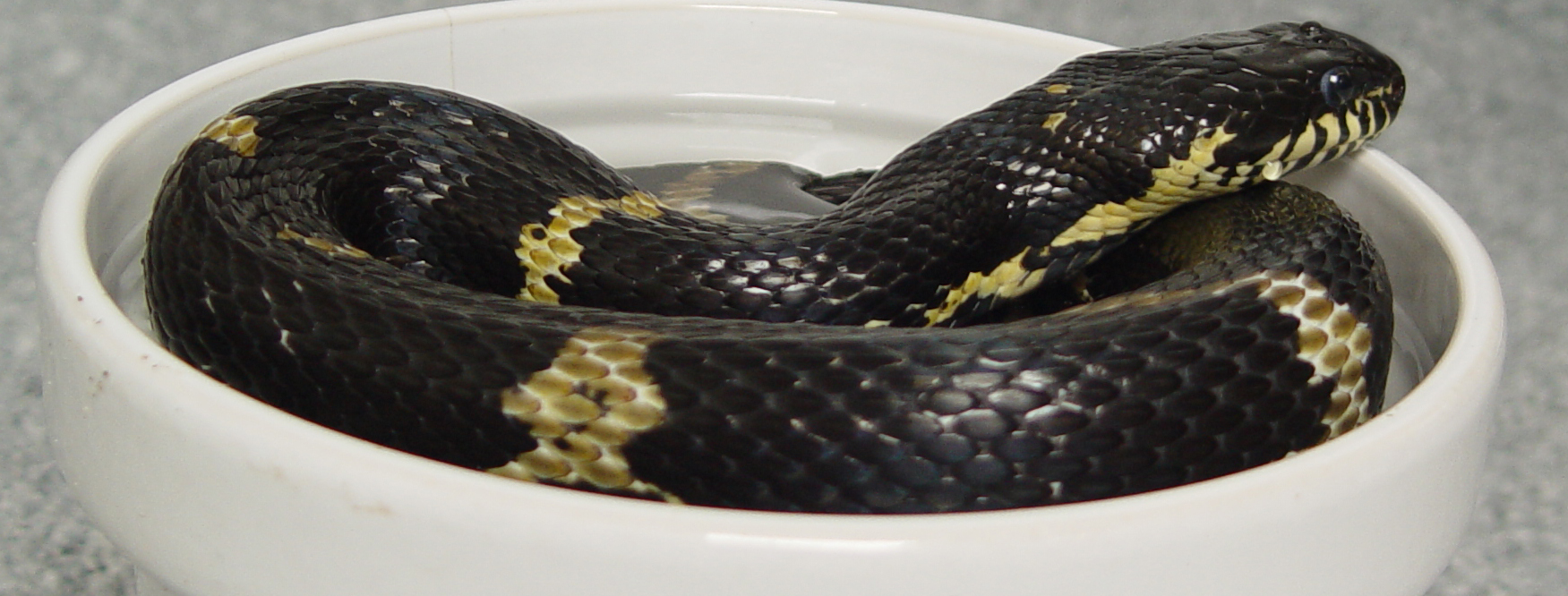
  Elaphe schrenckii
- European grass snake or grass snake (Natrix natrix)
- Steppe ribbon racer (Psammophis lineolatus)

== Family Viperidae ==
- Halys pit viper or Asian viper (Gloydius halys)
- Ussuri mamushi (Gloydius ussuriensis)
- Adder or common northern viper (Vipera berus)

== Sources ==
- Mongolian Red List of Reptiles and Amphibians. Zoological Society of London, Regent’s Park, London, NW1 4RY, 2006
