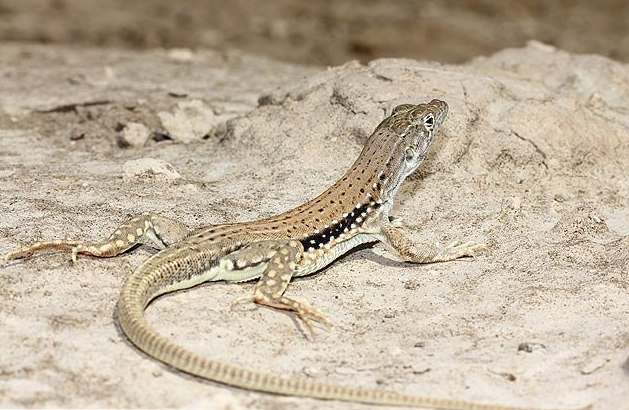

Conservation status
- Least Concern (IUCN 3.1)

Scientific classification
- Kingdom: Animalia
- Phylum: Chordata
- Class: Reptilia
- Order: Squamata
- Family: Lacertidae
- Genus: Eremias
- Species: E. persica

Binomial name
- Eremias persica Blanford, 1875

Synonyms
- Eremias velox persica; Eremias nigrolateralis Rastegar-Pouyani & Nilson, 1998

= Eremias persica =

Species of lizard

Eremias persica, the Aralo-Caspian racerunner or Persian racerunner, is a species of lizard native to Iranian Azerbaijan, most of Iran, southern Turkmenistan, Afghanistan, and western Pakistan. Eremias intermedia is also known as the Aralo-Caspian racerunner.

== Taxonomy and conservation ==
It was described by William Thomas Blanford in 1875. The type locality is near Isfahan, Iran. The specific epithet persica refers to its distribution in Persia (now known as Iran).

Eremias persica was assessed for the IUCN Red List in 2016 and considered a species of least concern.

Eremias nigrolateralis Rastegar-Pouyani & Nilson, 1998, the black-sided racerunner, was described based on dorsal color patterning differences but is now considered a synonym of E. persica. E. nigrolateralis was considered a species of least concern on the IUCN Red List based on its extensive, suitable habitat, large population, and presumed lack of significant threats. It was considered "unlikely to be declining fast enough to qualify for listing in a more threatened category".

== Description ==
It is most closely related to Eremias velox, of which it was previously treated as a subspecies, and they share several attributes such as having a wide range distribution across the Iranian Plateau, as well as the number of and shape of their scales. It can be morphologically distinguished from E. velox based on several characteristics, including:

- continuous dorsolateral black stripes (vs. E. velox with interrupted, forming ocelli with white spots),
- the stripes strongly contrasting with the base pattern (vs. not strongly contrasting),
- juveniles with 4 dark stripes on the back between dorsolateral white-spotted stripes (vs. 3 dark stripes), and
- juveniles with ventral surface of tail not red (vs. carmine red in E. velox).

Like many other lacertid lizards, the juveniles are more easily distinguished from other species than the adults. Other closely related species of Eremias racerunners include E. kopetdaghica, E. isfahanica, E. lalezharica, E. montana, E. papenfussi, E. strauchi, and E. suphani.

== Distribution and habitat ==
The Persian racerunner occurs in Iran, southern Azerbaijan, southern Turkmenistan, Afghanistan, and western Pakistan. In Iran, Eremias persica has a broad distribution in the central plateau south of the Alborz Mountains, including the Zagros Mountains, but it is absent from the central deserts Dasht-e Lut and Dasht-e Kavir. It is found in open plains and slopes, typically in areas of low vegetation and gravel surfaces. It is also found on mixed sand or silt and gravel.
