= Quadrifrons =

Quadrifrons is a Latin word meaning four-fronted or four-faced, and may refer to:

- In architecture, the Latin term for a tetrapylon
- An aspect of the Roman god Janus

== See also ==
- Eremias quadrifrons, a species of lizard in genus Eremias
