= Eremias roborowskii =

Scientific classification
- Domain: Eukaryota
- Kingdom: Animalia
- Phylum: Chordata
- Class: Reptilia
- Order: Squamata
- Family: Lacertidae
- Genus: Eremias
- Species: E. roborowskii

Binomial name
- Eremias roborowskii (Bedriaga, 1912)

Species of lizard

Eremias roborowskii is a species of lizard endemic to China. It is sometimes considered a subspecies of rapid racerunner (Eremias velox).
