= Eremias kopetdaghica =

Scientific classification
- Kingdom: Animalia
- Phylum: Chordata
- Class: Reptilia
- Order: Squamata
- Family: Lacertidae
- Genus: Eremias
- Species: E. kopetdaghica

Binomial name
- Eremias kopetdaghica Szczerbak, 1972

Species of lizard

Eremias kopetdaghica (commonly known as the Kopet Dagh racerunner) is a species of lizard found in Turkmenistan and Iran. It is sometimes considered a subspecies of Eremias strauchi.
