= Eremias yarkandensis =

Scientific classification
- Domain: Eukaryota
- Kingdom: Animalia
- Phylum: Chordata
- Class: Reptilia
- Order: Squamata
- Family: Lacertidae
- Genus: Eremias
- Species: E. yarkandensis

Binomial name
- Eremias yarkandensis Blanford, 1875

Species of lizard

Eremias yarkandensis (commonly known as the Yarkend racerunner or Yarkand sandlizard) is a species of lizard found in China and Kyrgyzstan.
