= Eremias rafiqi =

Scientific classification
- Domain: Eukaryota
- Kingdom: Animalia
- Phylum: Chordata
- Class: Reptilia
- Order: Squamata
- Family: Lacertidae
- Genus: Eremias
- Species: E. rafiqi

Binomial name
- Eremias rafiqi Masroor, Khan, Nadeem, Amir, Khisroon, & Jablonski, 2022

Species of lizard

Rafiq’s racerunner (Eremias rafiqi) is a species of lizard found in Pakistan.
