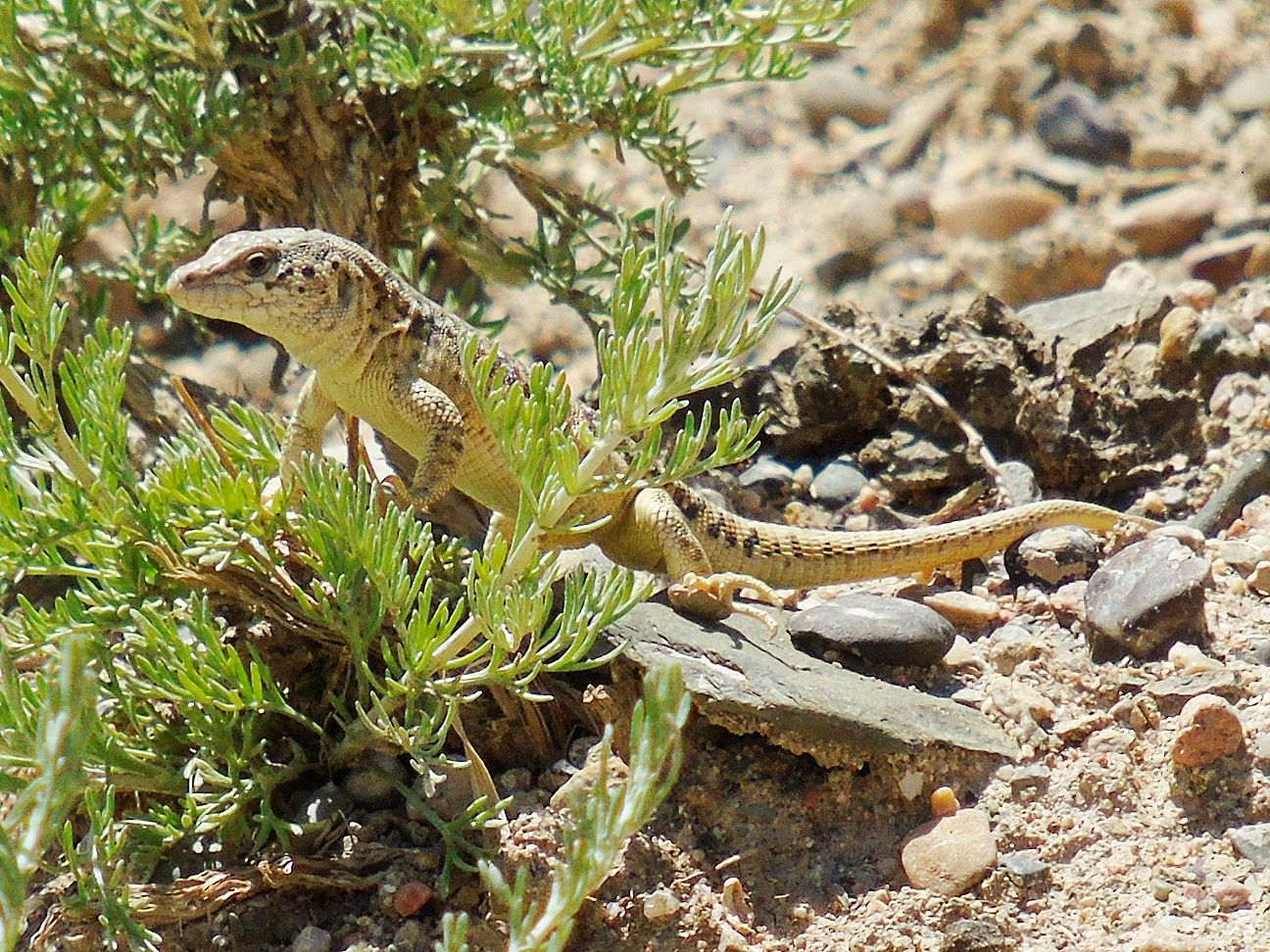

Conservation status
- Data Deficient (IUCN 3.1)

Scientific classification
- Kingdom: Animalia
- Phylum: Chordata
- Class: Reptilia
- Order: Squamata
- Suborder: Lacertoidea
- Family: Lacertidae
- Genus: Eremias
- Species: E. szczerbaki

Binomial name
- Eremias szczerbaki Jeremčenko, Panfilov, & Zarinenko, 1992

= Eremias szczerbaki =

Species of lizard

Eremias szczerbaki (commonly known as Szczerbak's racerunner) is a species of lizard endemic to Kyrgyzstan.
