= Eremias kokshaaliensis =

Conservation status
- Data Deficient (IUCN 3.1)

Scientific classification
- Kingdom: Animalia
- Phylum: Chordata
- Class: Reptilia
- Order: Squamata
- Suborder: Lacertoidea
- Family: Lacertidae
- Genus: Eremias
- Species: E. kokshaaliensis

Binomial name
- Eremias kokshaaliensis Jeremčenko & Panfilov, 1999

Species of lizard

Eremias kokshaaliensis is a species of lizard found in China and Kyrgyzstan.
