= Eremias fahimii =

Scientific classification
- Domain: Eukaryota
- Kingdom: Animalia
- Phylum: Chordata
- Class: Reptilia
- Order: Squamata
- Family: Lacertidae
- Genus: Eremias
- Species: E. fahimii

Binomial name
- Eremias fahimii Omid Mozaffari, Ahmadzadeh & Saberi-Pirooz, 2020

Species of lizard

Eremias fahimii (commonly known as Fahimi's racerunner) is a species of lizard in the family Lacertidae found in Iran.

== Distribution and habitat ==
It is found in the Markazi Province up to the western side of Tehran Province. It may also occur in the Alborz, Qom, Qazvin and Zanjan provinces.
