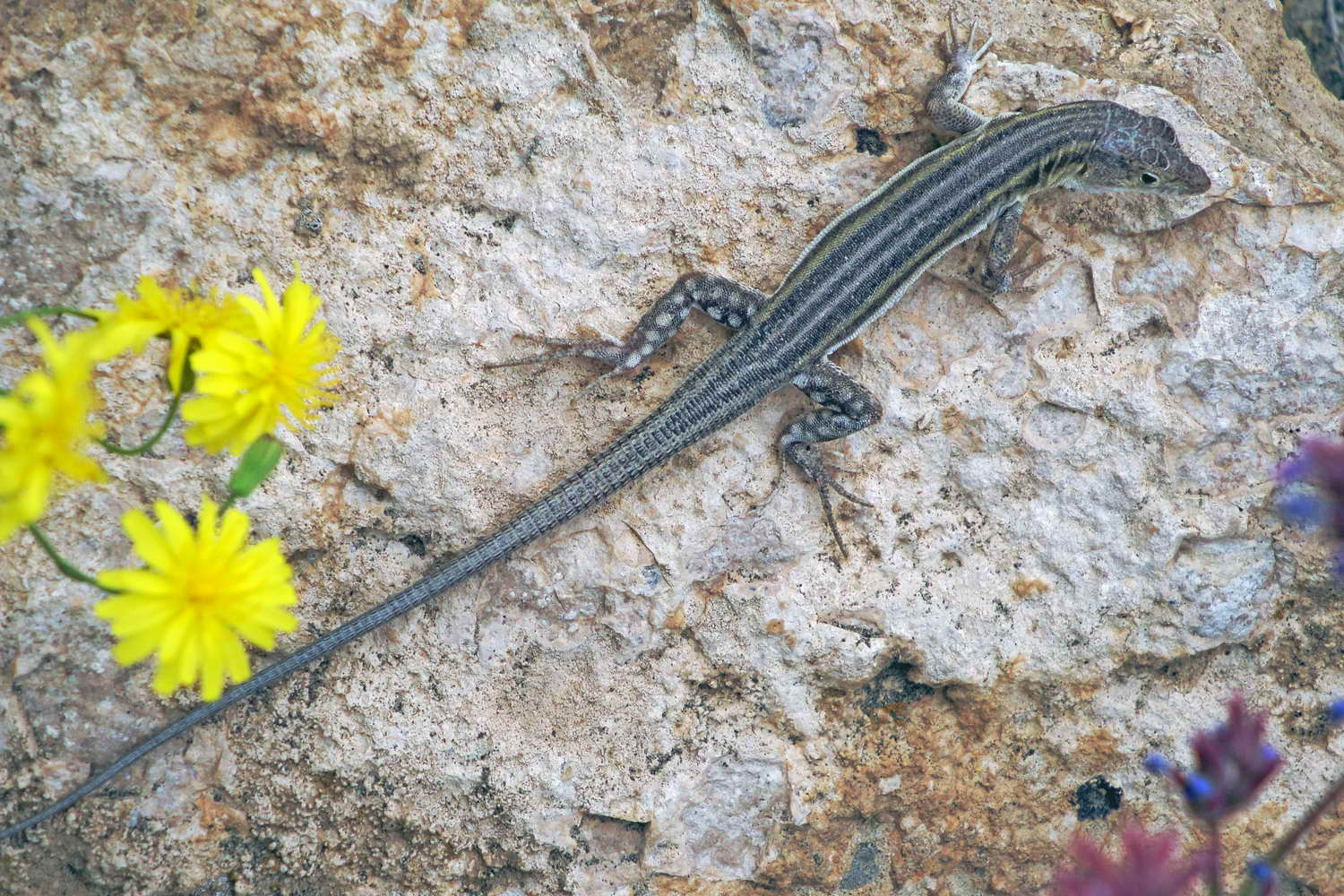

Conservation status
- Critically Endangered (IUCN 3.1)

Scientific classification
- Kingdom: Animalia
- Phylum: Chordata
- Class: Reptilia
- Order: Squamata
- Family: Lacertidae
- Genus: Eremias
- Species: E. pleskei

Binomial name
- Eremias pleskei Nikolsky, 1905

= Eremias pleskei =

Species of lizard

Eremias pleskei, commonly known as Pleske's racerunner or the trans-Caucasian racerunner, is a species of lizard in the family Lacertidae. The species is native to the Armenian plateau in Armenia, Azerbaijan, Iran, and Turkey.

== Etymology ==
The specific name, pleskei, is in honor of Russian zoologist Fedor Dmitrievich Pleske (1858–1932).

== Habitat ==
The natural habitat of E. pleskei is desert at altitudes of 500–1,700 m (1,600–5,600 ft).

== Reproduction ==
E. pleskei is oviparous.
