= Eremias buechneri =

Conservation status
- Least Concern (IUCN 3.1)

Scientific classification
- Kingdom: Animalia
- Phylum: Chordata
- Class: Reptilia
- Order: Squamata
- Family: Lacertidae
- Genus: Eremias
- Species: E. buechneri

Binomial name
- Eremias buechneri Bedriaga, 1907

Species of lizard

Eremias buechneri, also known commonly as the Kaschar racerunner, is a species of lizard in the family Lacertidae. The species is endemic to China.

== Etymology ==
The specific name, buechneri, is in honor of German-Russian zoologist Eugen Büchner.

== Geographic range ==
Within China, E. buechneri is found in Qinghai Province and Xinjiang Autonomous Region, both of which are in northwestern China.

== Habitat ==
The preferred natural habitat of E. buechneri is desert, at altitudes of 800–3,500 m (2,600–11,500 ft).

== Reproduction ==
E. buechneri is viviparous.
