= Eremias cholistanica =

Scientific classification
- Domain: Eukaryota
- Kingdom: Animalia
- Phylum: Chordata
- Class: Reptilia
- Order: Squamata
- Family: Lacertidae
- Genus: Eremias
- Species: E. cholistanica

Binomial name
- Eremias cholistanica Baig & Masroor, 2006

Species of lizard

Eremias cholistanica is a species of lizard found in Pakistan.
