= Eremias stummeri =

Conservation status
- Least Concern (IUCN 3.1)

Scientific classification
- Kingdom: Animalia
- Phylum: Chordata
- Class: Reptilia
- Order: Squamata
- Suborder: Lacertoidea
- Family: Lacertidae
- Genus: Eremias
- Species: E. stummeri

Binomial name
- Eremias stummeri Wettstein, 1940

Species of lizard

Eremias stummeri (commonly known as Stummer's racerunner or Tien-Shan racerunner) is a species of lizard found in Kyrgyzstan and Kazakhstan.
