= Eremias kakari =

Scientific classification
- Domain: Eukaryota
- Kingdom: Animalia
- Phylum: Chordata
- Class: Reptilia
- Order: Squamata
- Family: Lacertidae
- Genus: Eremias
- Species: E. kakari

Binomial name
- Eremias kakari Masroor, Khisroon, Khan, & Jablonski, 2020

Species of lizard

Kakar's racerunner (Eremias kakari) is a species of lizard found in Pakistan.
