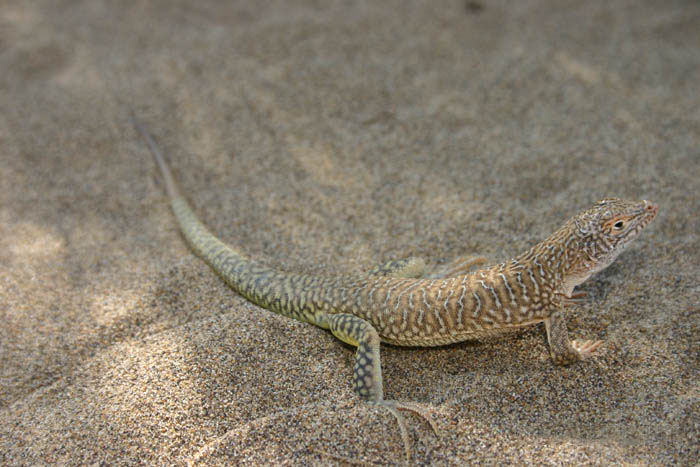
- Photograph taken in the Maranjab Sand dunes of Kashan, Isfahan, Iran

Conservation status
- Least Concern (IUCN 3.1)

Scientific classification
- Kingdom: Animalia
- Phylum: Chordata
- Class: Reptilia
- Order: Squamata
- Suborder: Lacertoidea
- Family: Lacertidae
- Genus: Eremias
- Species: E. kavirensis

Binomial name
- Eremias kavirensis Mozaffari & Parham, 2007

= Eremias kavirensis =

Species of lizard

Eremias kavirensis (commonly known as the Maranjaab racerunner) is a large Eremias lizard known only from Kavir National Park, Iran. It has a snout–vent length of up to 83 millimetres (3.3 in); the background colour of the dorsum is sandy, yellowish-brown, and broken by grey transverse bars that are sometimes bordered with darker brown margins. There are dark brown spots on the head that are larger on the posterior head scales. The dorsal side of the limbs has enlarged light spots that, on the tibia especially, merge into semi-transverse stripes.
