= Eremias suphani =

Conservation status
- Least Concern (IUCN 3.1)

Scientific classification
- Kingdom: Animalia
- Phylum: Chordata
- Class: Reptilia
- Order: Squamata
- Family: Lacertidae
- Genus: Eremias
- Species: E. suphani

Binomial name
- Eremias suphani Basoglu & Hellmich, 1968

Species of lizard

Eremias suphani (commonly known as the Suphan racerunner or Başoğlu's racerunner) is a species of lizard found in the vicinity of Lake Van, Turkey.
