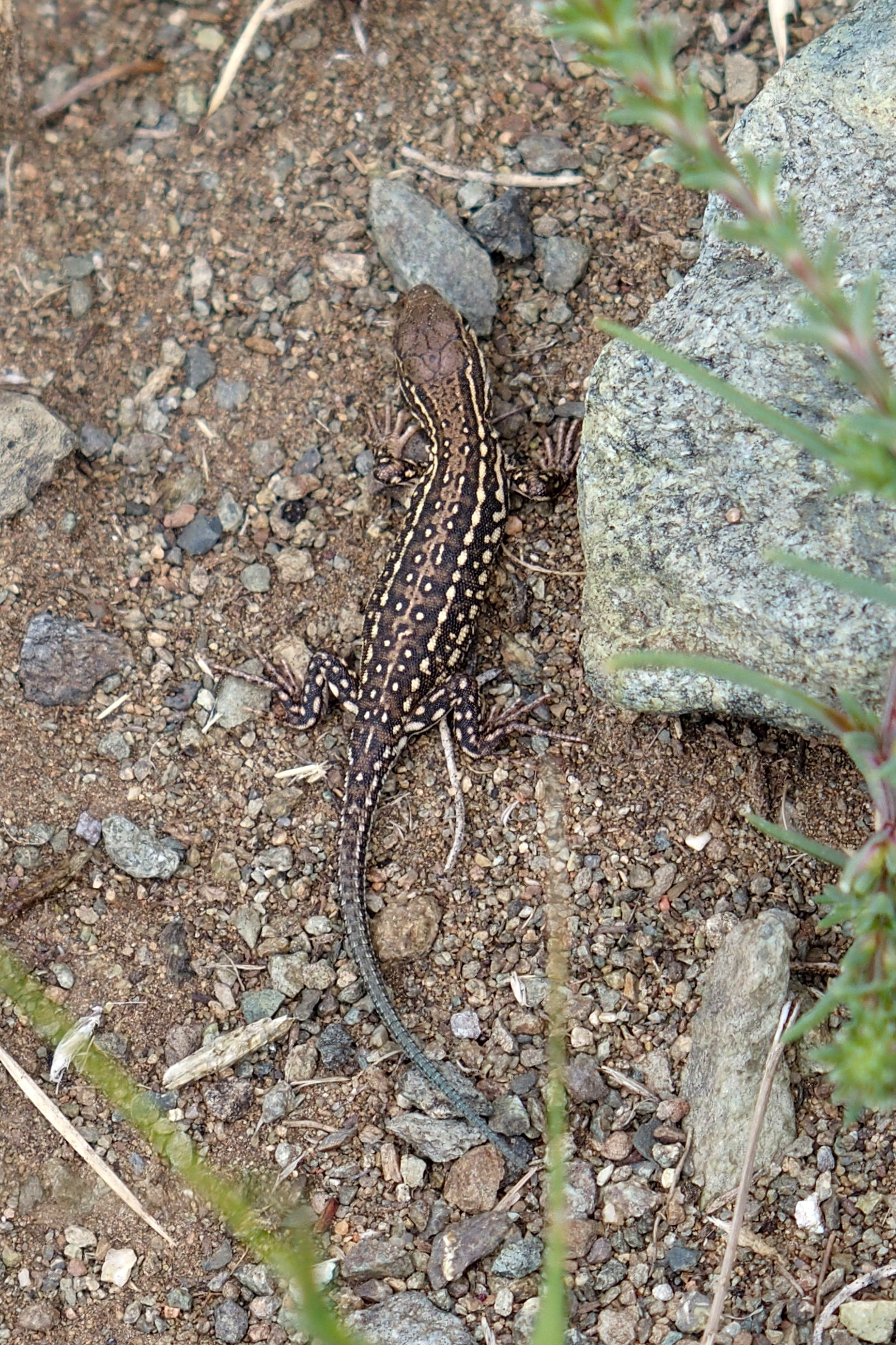

Conservation status
- Least Concern (IUCN 3.1)

Scientific classification
- Kingdom: Animalia
- Phylum: Chordata
- Class: Reptilia
- Order: Squamata
- Family: Lacertidae
- Genus: Eremias
- Species: E. argus

Binomial name
- Eremias argus W. Peters, 1869

= Eremias argus =

Species of lizard

Eremias argus (Korean: 표범장지뱀, Chinese: 丽斑麻蜥, Russian: Монгольская ящурка), also known commonly as the Mongolia racerunner, is a species of lizard in the family Lacertidae. The species is endemic to Asia. There are two recognized subspecies.

== Etymology ==
The specific name, argus, refers to Argus, the many-eyed giant in Greek mythology, an allusion to the ocelli (eye spots) of this species.

== Geographic range ==
E. argus is found in China, Korea, Mongolia, and Russia.

== Habitat ==
E. argus is found in a wide variety of habitats, including desert, rocky areas, grassland, shrubland, forest, and freshwater wetlands. Similarly, the species has been found at a wide range of altitudes, 50–3,400 m (160–11,150 ft).

== Reproduction ==
E. argus is oviparous.

== Subspecies ==
Two subspecies are recognized as being valid, including the nominotypical subspecies.

- Eremias argus argus W. Peters, 1869
- Eremias argus barbouri Schmidt, 1925
