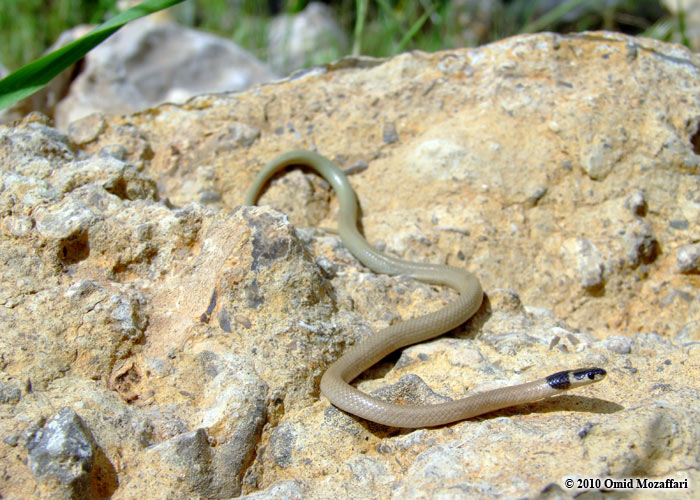

Conservation status
- Least Concern (IUCN 3.1)

Scientific classification
- Kingdom: Animalia
- Phylum: Chordata
- Class: Reptilia
- Order: Squamata
- Suborder: Serpentes
- Family: Colubridae
- Genus: Eirenis
- Species: E. persicus

Binomial name
- Eirenis persicus (Anderson, 1872)

= Eirenis persicus =

Species of snake

Eirenis persicus is a species of snake of the family Colubridae. It is commonly known as the dark-headed dwarf racer.

== Geographic range ==
The snake is found in the Middle East. Eirenis persicus has a wide distribution range. They can be found in south-eastern Turkey, southern Armenia, eastern Iraq, Iran, south Turkmenistan and also in some parts of Afghanistan, Pakistan, and north-western India.
