= Eremias quadrifrons =

Scientific classification
- Domain: Eukaryota
- Kingdom: Animalia
- Phylum: Chordata
- Class: Reptilia
- Order: Squamata
- Family: Lacertidae
- Genus: Eremias
- Species: E. quadrifrons

Binomial name
- Eremias quadrifrons (Strauch, 1876)

Species of lizard

Eremias quadrifrons (commonly known as the Alachan racerunner) is a species of lizard endemic to China.
