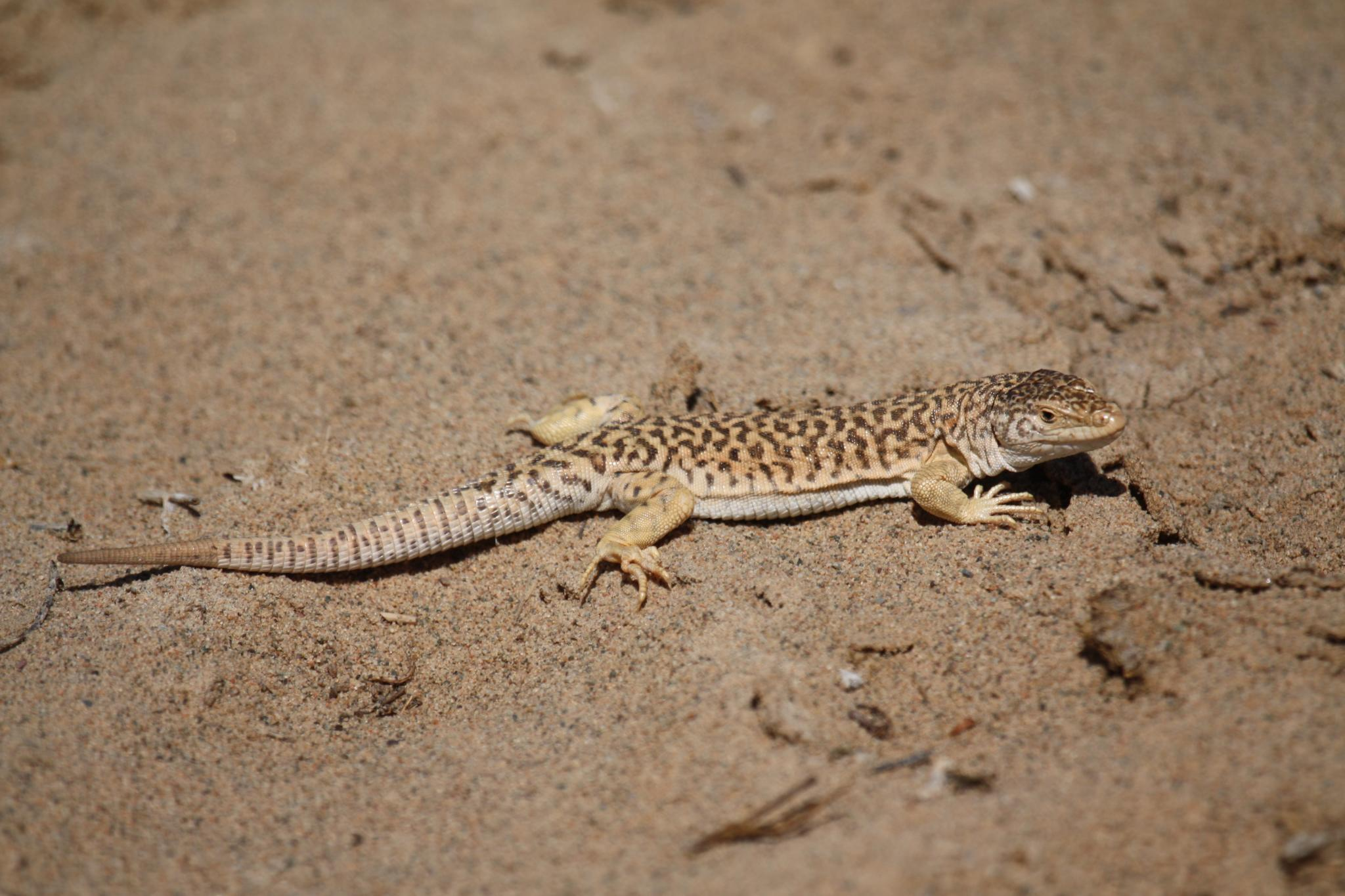

Scientific classification
- Kingdom: Animalia
- Phylum: Chordata
- Class: Reptilia
- Order: Squamata
- Family: Lacertidae
- Genus: Eremias
- Species: E. przewalskii

Binomial name
- Eremias przewalskii (Strauch, 1876)

Synonyms
- Podarces przewalskii Strauch, 1876; Podarces kessleri Strauch, 1876; Podarces brachydactyla Strauch, 1876; Eremias przewalskii — Boulenger, 1887

= Eremias przewalskii =

Species of lizard

Eremias przewalskii, commonly known as the Gobi racerunner, is a species of lizard in the family Lacertidae. The species is endemic to Asia.

== Etymology ==
The specific name, przewalskii, is in honor of Russian explorer and naturalist Nikolai Mikhailovitch Prjevalsky.

== Geographic range ==
E. przewalskii is found in China, Kyrgyzstan, Mongolia, and Russia.

== Habitat ==
The preferred habitats of E. przewalskii are desert, forest, shrubland, and wetlands, at altitudes of 500–1,800 m (1,600–5,900 ft).

== Reproduction ==
E. przewalskii is viviparous.
