= Eremias lalezharica =

Conservation status
- Least Concern (IUCN 3.1)

Scientific classification
- Kingdom: Animalia
- Phylum: Chordata
- Class: Reptilia
- Order: Squamata
- Family: Lacertidae
- Genus: Eremias
- Species: E. lalezharica

Binomial name
- Eremias lalezharica Moravec, 1994

Species of lizard

Eremias lalezharica, the Lalehzar racerunner, is a species of lizard found in the Iranian village of Lalehzar.
