= Eremias nikolskii =

Conservation status
- Least Concern (IUCN 3.1)

Scientific classification
- Kingdom: Animalia
- Phylum: Chordata
- Class: Reptilia
- Order: Squamata
- Family: Lacertidae
- Genus: Eremias
- Species: E. nikolskii

Binomial name
- Eremias nikolskii Bedriaga, 1905

Species of lizard

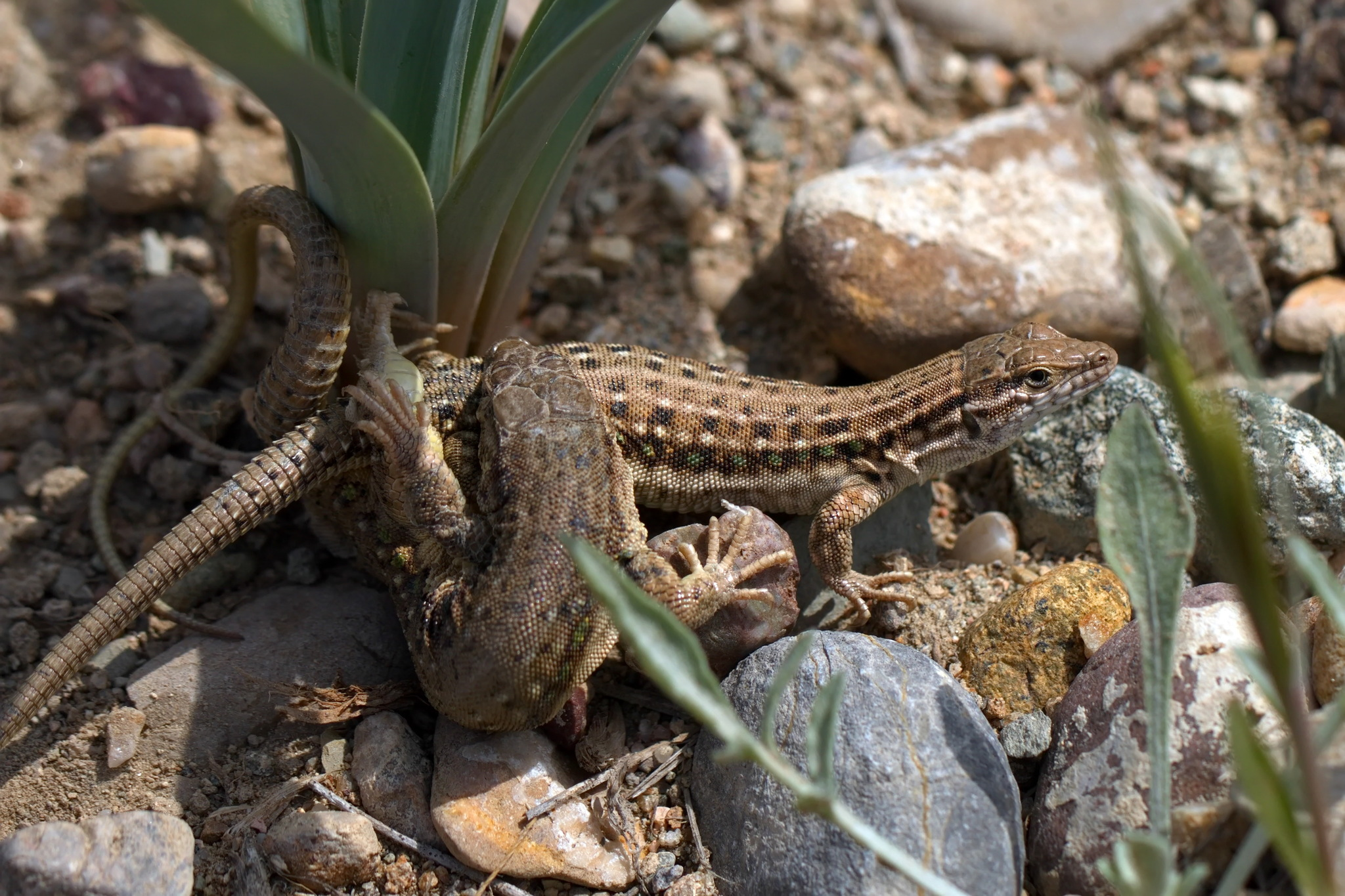
Photo

Eremias nikolskii, commonly known as the Kirghiz racerunner, is a species of lizard in the family Lacertidae. The species is native to Central Asia.

== Etymology ==
The specific name, nikolskii, is in honor of Russian herpetologist Alexander Nikolsky.

== Geographic distribution ==
Eremias nikolskii is found in Kazakhstan, Kyrgyzstan, Tajikistan, and Uzbekistan.

== Habitat ==
The preferred natural habitat of Eremias nikolskii is rocky shrubland, at elevations of 1,000–3,000 m (3,300–9,800 ft).

== Behavior ==
Eremias nikolskii is terrestrial and diurnal.

== Reproduction ==
Eremias nikolskii is oviparous. Clutch size is two to six eggs, and each adult female lays two clutches per year.
