= Point-snouted racerunner =

Conservation status
- Least Concern (IUCN 3.1)

Scientific classification
- Kingdom: Animalia
- Phylum: Chordata
- Class: Reptilia
- Order: Squamata
- Suborder: Lacertoidea
- Family: Lacertidae
- Genus: Eremias
- Species: E. acutorostris

Binomial name
- Eremias acutorostris (Boulenger, 1887)

Species of lizard

The point-snouted racerunner (Eremias acutirostris) is a species of lizard found in east Iran, south Afghanistan and Pakistan .
