= Afghan racerunner =

Conservation status
- Least Concern (IUCN 3.1)

Scientific classification
- Kingdom: Animalia
- Phylum: Chordata
- Class: Reptilia
- Order: Squamata
- Family: Lacertidae
- Genus: Eremias
- Species: E. afghanistanica

Binomial name
- Eremias afghanistanica Böhme & Szczerbak, 1991

Species of lizard

The Afghan racerunner (Eremias afghanistanica) is a species of lizard found in Afghanistan.
