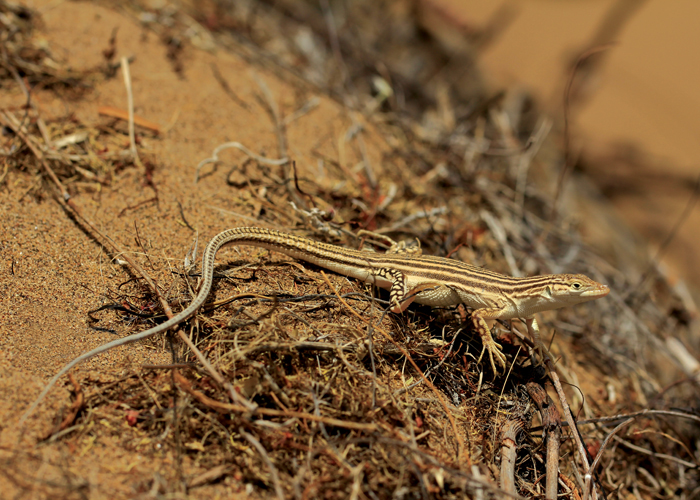

Scientific classification
- Domain: Eukaryota
- Kingdom: Animalia
- Phylum: Chordata
- Class: Reptilia
- Order: Squamata
- Family: Lacertidae
- Genus: Eremias
- Species: E. fasciata

Binomial name
- Eremias fasciata Blanford, 1874

= Eremias fasciata =

Species of lizard

Eremias fasciata (commonly known as the Sistan racerunner) is a species of lizard found in Iran, Afghanistan, and Pakistan.
