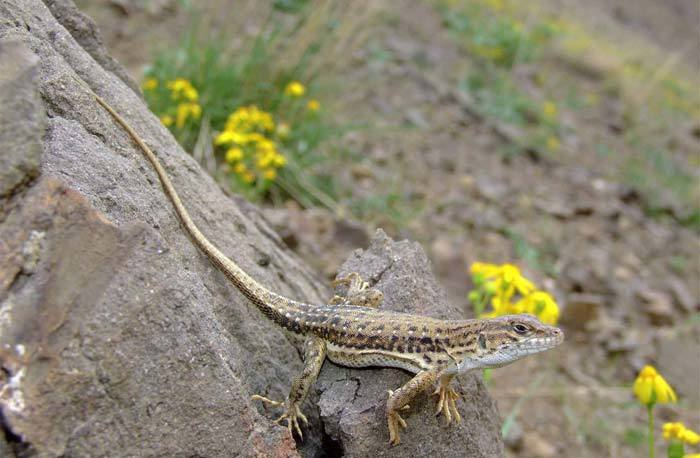

Scientific classification
- Kingdom: Animalia
- Phylum: Chordata
- Class: Reptilia
- Order: Squamata
- Family: Lacertidae
- Genus: Eremias
- Species: E. papenfussi

Binomial name
- Eremias papenfussi Mozaffari, Ahmadzadeh & Parham, 2011

= Eremias papenfussi =

Species of lizard

Eremias papenfussi, commonly known as Papenfuss's racerunner, is a species of lizard in the family Lacertidae. The species is endemic to Iran.

== Etymology ==
The specific name, papenfussi, is in honor of American herpetologist Theodore Johnstone Papenfuss.
