= Eremias dzungarica =

Scientific classification
- Kingdom: Animalia
- Phylum: Chordata
- Class: Reptilia
- Order: Squamata
- Family: Lacertidae
- Genus: Eremias
- Species: E. dzungarica

Binomial name
- Eremias dzungarica Orlova, Poyarkov Jr., Chirikova, Nazarov, Munkhbaatar, Munkhbayar, & Terbish, 2017

Species of lizard

Eremias dzungarica (commonly known as the Dzungarian racerunner) is a species of lizard found in western Mongolia, eastern Kazakhstan and Xinjiang, Northwest China.
