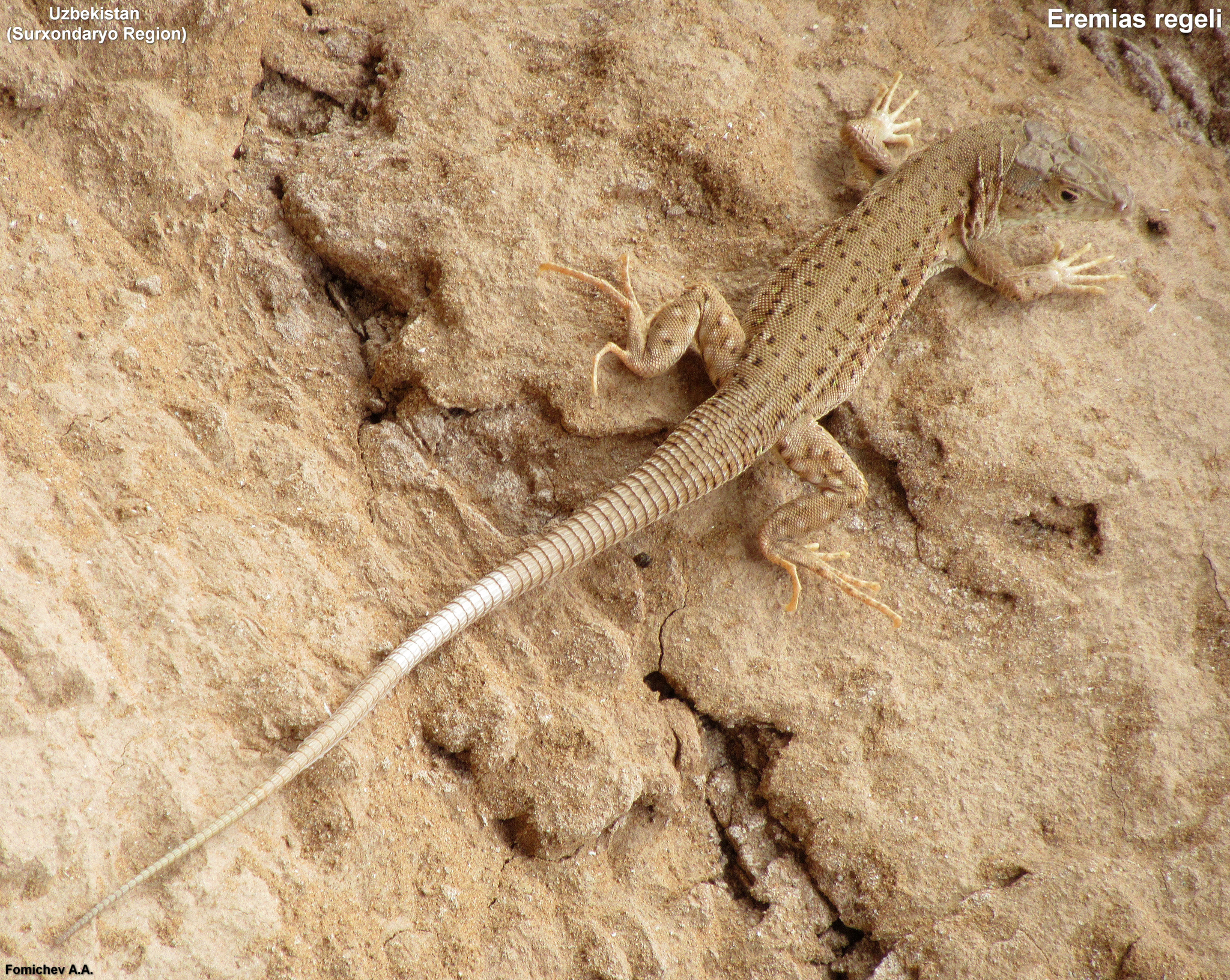

Scientific classification
- Kingdom: Animalia
- Phylum: Chordata
- Class: Reptilia
- Order: Squamata
- Suborder: Lacertoidea
- Family: Lacertidae
- Genus: Eremias
- Species: E. regeli

Binomial name
- Eremias regeli Bedriaga in Nikolsky, 1905

= Eremias regeli =

Species of lizard

Eremias regeli is a species of lizard found in Turkmenistan, Uzbekistan, Tajikistan, and Afghanistan.
