= Eremias aria =

Conservation status
- Least Concern (IUCN 3.1)

Scientific classification
- Kingdom: Animalia
- Phylum: Chordata
- Class: Reptilia
- Order: Squamata
- Family: Lacertidae
- Genus: Eremias
- Species: E. aria

Binomial name
- Eremias aria Anderson & Leviton, 1967

Species of lizard

Eremias aria is a species of lizard found in Afghanistan.
