= Eremias intermedia =

Conservation status
- Least Concern (IUCN 3.1)

Scientific classification
- Kingdom: Animalia
- Phylum: Chordata
- Class: Reptilia
- Order: Squamata
- Suborder: Lacertoidea
- Family: Lacertidae
- Genus: Eremias
- Species: E. intermedia

Binomial name
- Eremias intermedia (Strauch, 1876)

Species of lizard

Eremias intermedia (commonly known as the Aralo-Caspian racerunner) is a species of lizard found in Kazakhstan, Turkmenistan, Tajikistan, Uzbekistan, Iran, and Kyrgyzstan. Eremias persica is also known as the Aralo-Caspian racerunner.
