= Eremias isfahanica =

Scientific classification
- Kingdom: Animalia
- Phylum: Chordata
- Class: Reptilia
- Order: Squamata
- Suborder: Lacertoidea
- Family: Lacertidae
- Genus: Eremias
- Species: E. isfahanica

Binomial name
- Eremias isfahanica Rastegar-Pouyani, Hosseinian, Rafiee, Kami, Rajabizadeh, & Wink, 2016

Species of lizard

Eremias isfahanica is a species of lizard endemic to Iran.
