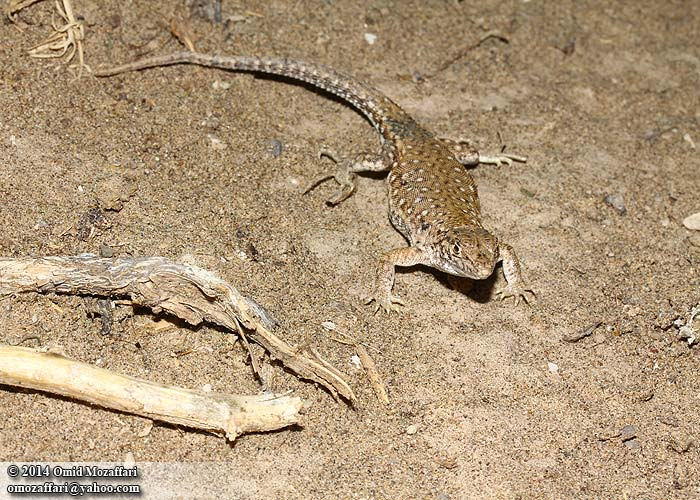

Conservation status
- Least Concern (IUCN 3.1)

Scientific classification
- Kingdom: Animalia
- Phylum: Chordata
- Class: Reptilia
- Order: Squamata
- Suborder: Lacertoidea
- Family: Lacertidae
- Genus: Eremias
- Species: E. nigrocellata

Binomial name
- Eremias nigrocellata Nikolsky, 1896

= Eremias nigrocellata =

Species of lizard

Eremias nigrocellata (commonly known as the black-ocellated racerunner) is a species of lizard found in Turkmenistan, Uzbekistan, Tadzhikistan, Iran, and Afghanistan.
