= Eremias montana =

Conservation status
- Least Concern (IUCN 3.1)

Scientific classification
- Domain: Eukaryota
- Kingdom: Animalia
- Phylum: Chordata
- Class: Reptilia
- Order: Squamata
- Family: Lacertidae
- Genus: Eremias
- Species: E. montana

Binomial name
- Eremias montana Rastegar-Pouyani & Rastegar-Pouyani, 2001

Synonyms
- Eremias montanus; Eremias nova

Species of lizard

Eremias montana (commonly known as the mountain racerunner), is a species of lizard found in the Alvand Mountains in Hamadan Province, Iran.
