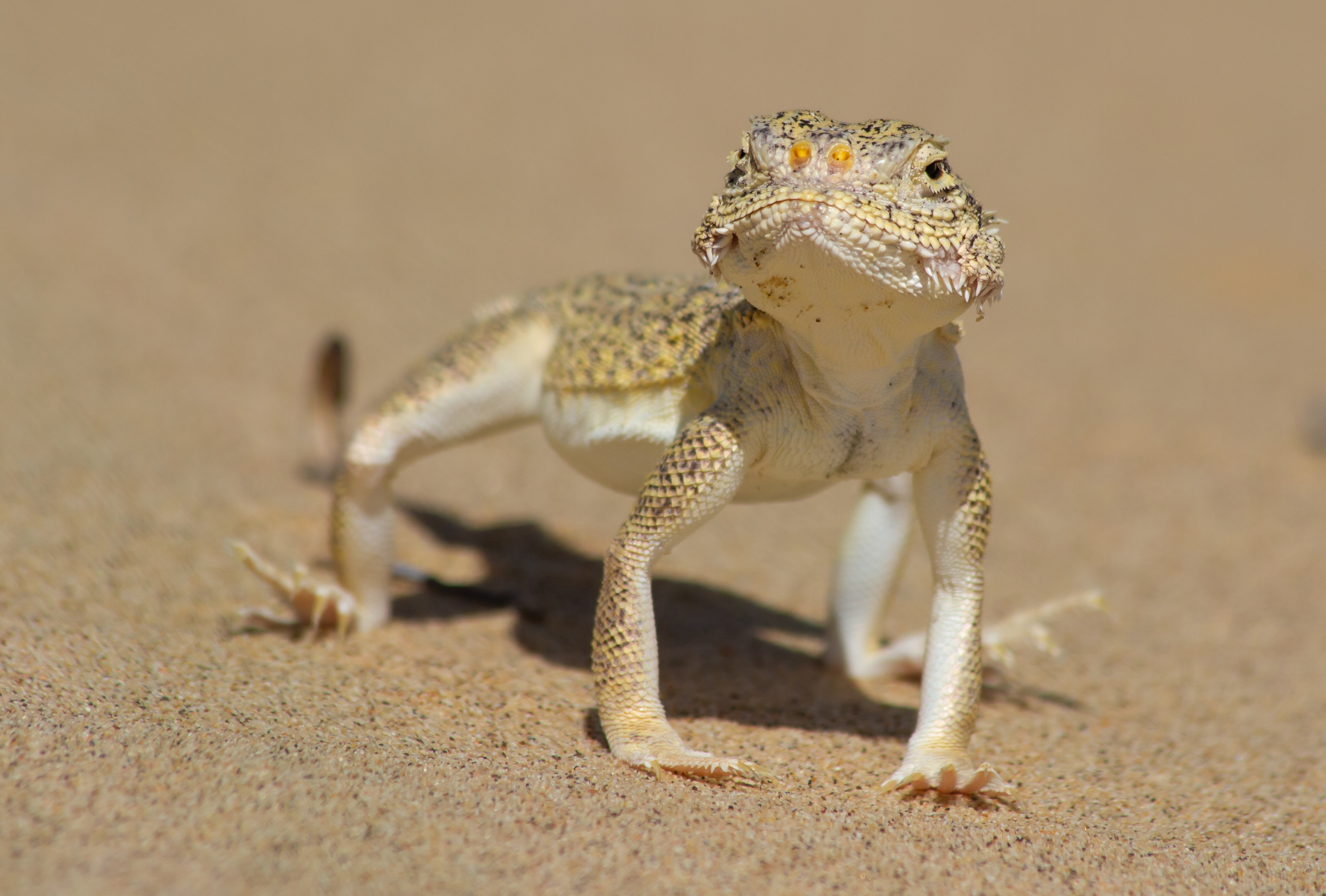

Scientific classification
- Domain: Eukaryota
- Kingdom: Animalia
- Phylum: Chordata
- Class: Reptilia
- Order: Squamata
- Suborder: Iguania
- Family: Agamidae
- Genus: Phrynocephalus
- Species: P. interscapularis

Binomial name
- Phrynocephalus interscapularis Lichtenstein & Martens, 1856

= Phrynocephalus interscapularis =

Species of lizard

Phrynocephalus interscapularis, Lichtenstein's toadhead agama, is a species of agamid lizard found in Turkmenistan, Kazakhstan, Uzbekistan, Iran, and Afghanistan.
