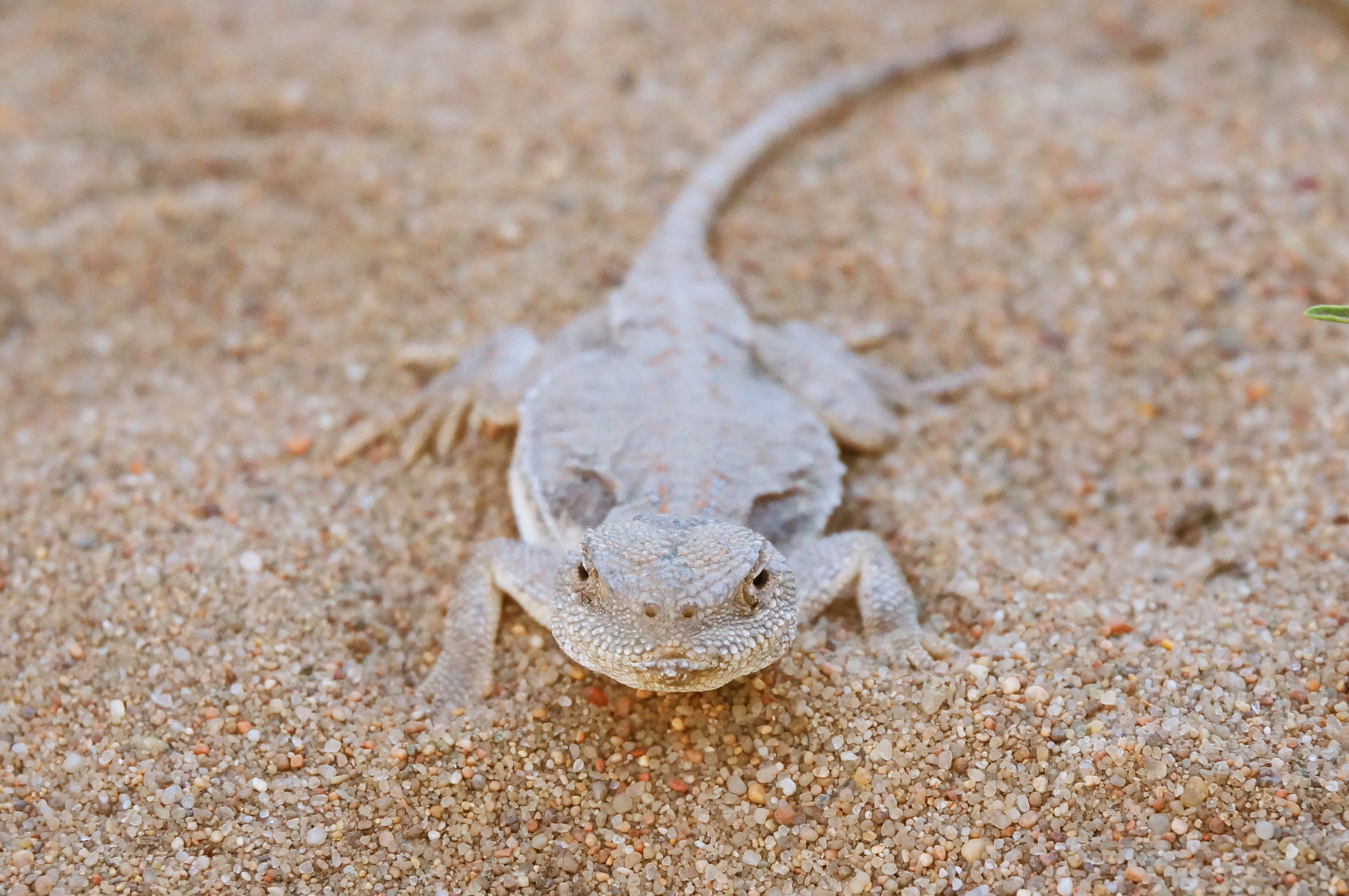

Conservation status
- Least Concern (IUCN 3.1)

Scientific classification
- Kingdom: Animalia
- Phylum: Chordata
- Class: Reptilia
- Order: Squamata
- Suborder: Iguania
- Family: Agamidae
- Genus: Phrynocephalus
- Species: P. helioscopus

Binomial name
- Phrynocephalus helioscopus (Pallas, 1771)

= Phrynocephalus helioscopus =

Species of lizard

Phrynocephalus helioscopus, the sunwatcher toadhead agama, Fergana toad-headed agama, or sunwatcher, is a species of agamid lizard found in Kazakhstan, S Russia, Turkmenistan, Uzbekistan, Kyrgyzstan, Tajikistan, Turkey, Iraq, China, Mongolia, and Iran.

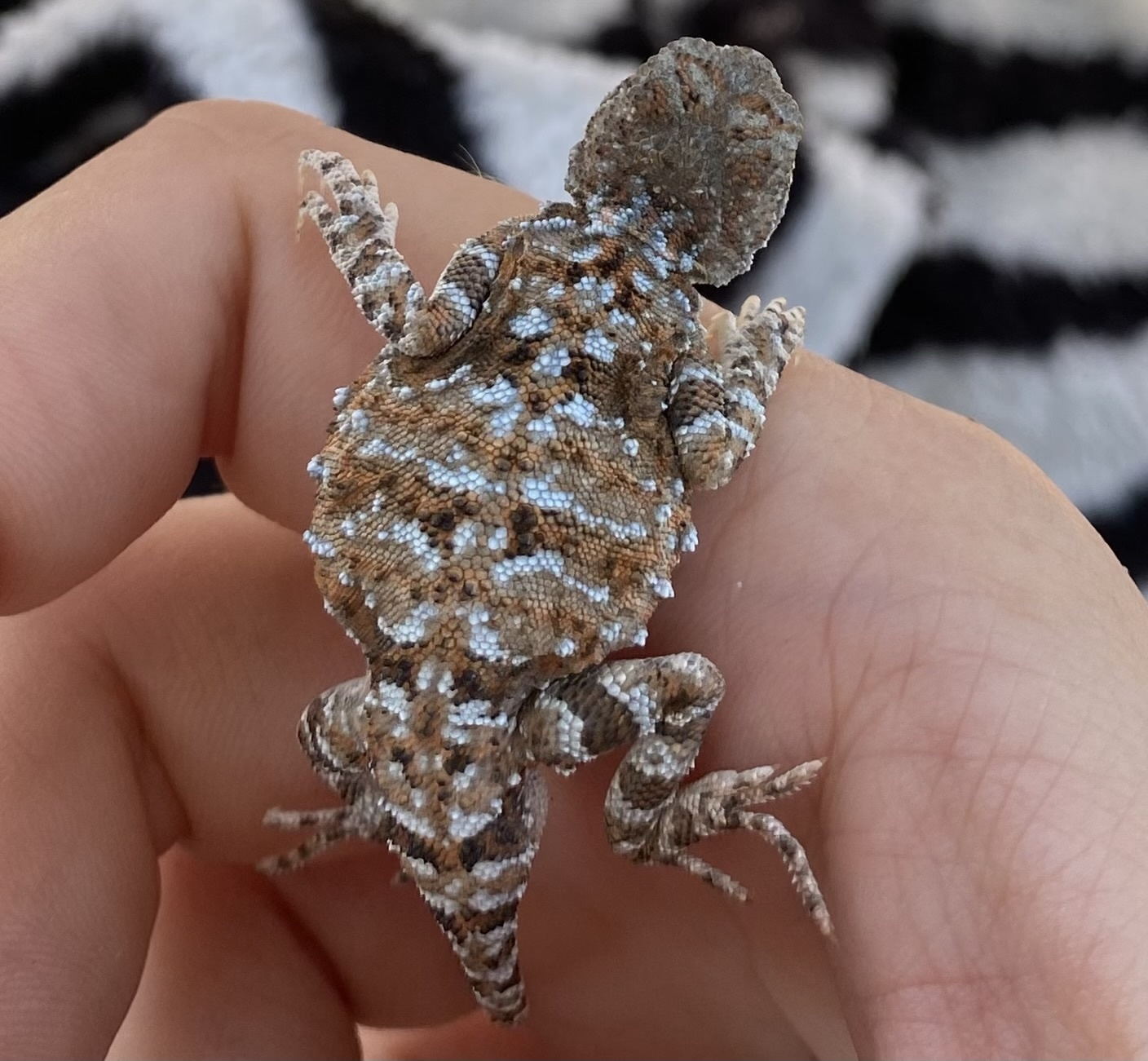
