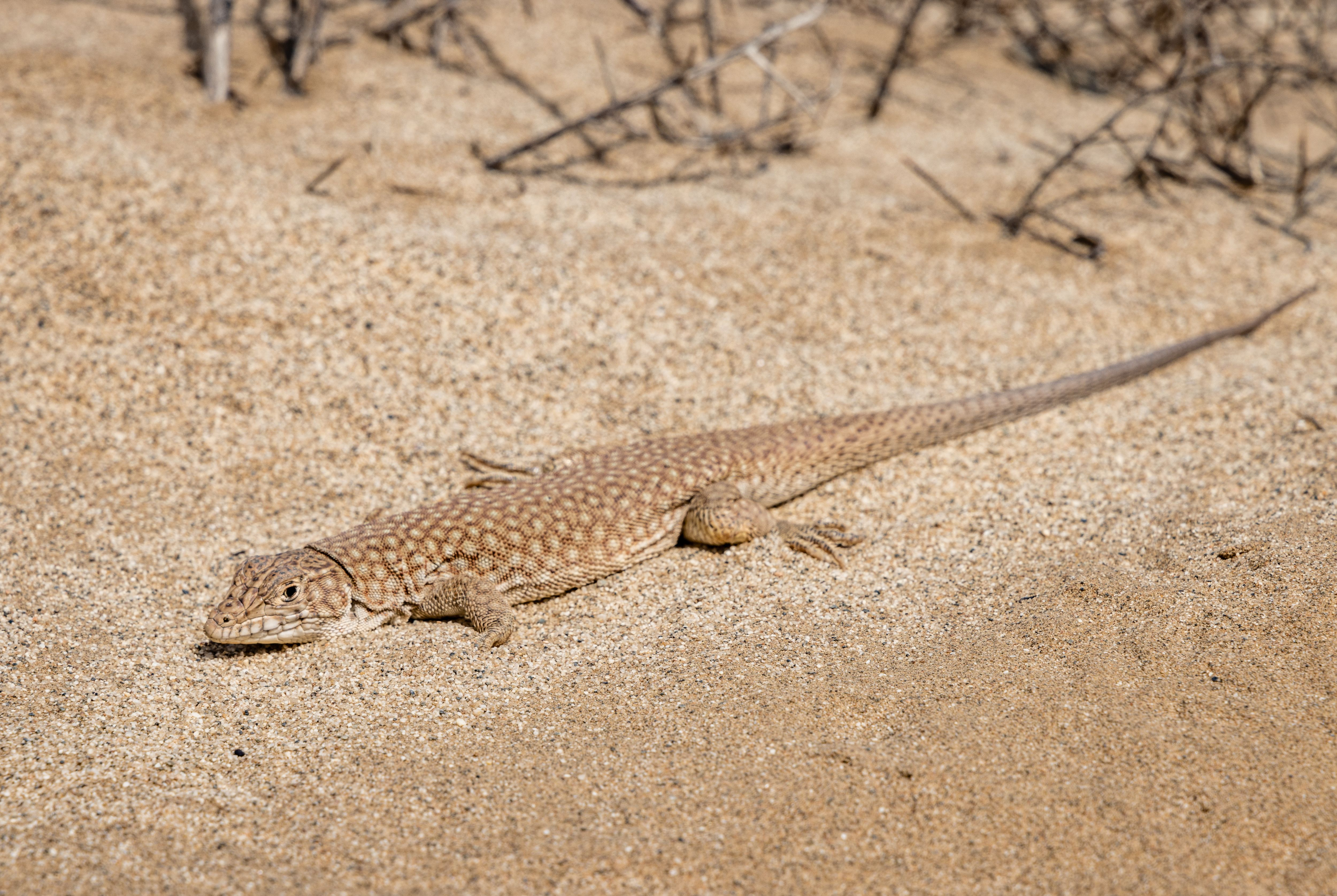

Conservation status
- Least Concern (IUCN 3.1)

Scientific classification
- Kingdom: Animalia
- Phylum: Chordata
- Class: Reptilia
- Order: Squamata
- Suborder: Lacertoidea
- Family: Lacertidae
- Genus: Eremias
- Species: E. grammica

Binomial name
- Eremias grammica (Lichtenstein, 1823)

= Eremias grammica =

Species of lizard

Eremias grammica (commonly known as the reticulate racerunner) is a species of lizard found in Kazakhstan, Turkmenistan, Tajikistan, Uzbekistan, Iran, Afghanistan, Kyrgyzstan, and China.
