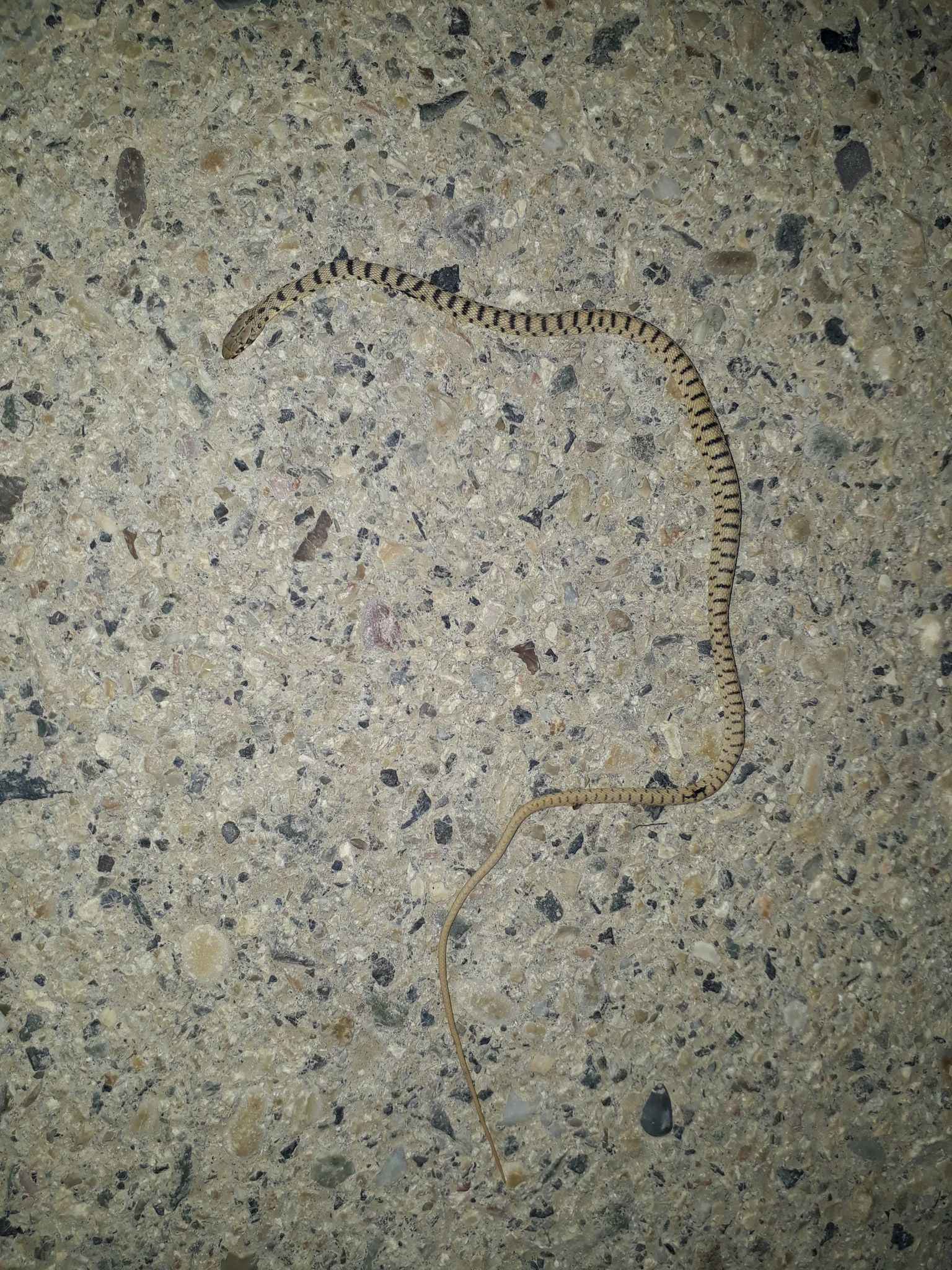

Conservation status
- Least Concern (IUCN 3.1)

Scientific classification
- Kingdom: Animalia
- Phylum: Chordata
- Class: Reptilia
- Order: Squamata
- Suborder: Serpentes
- Family: Colubridae
- Genus: Platyceps
- Species: P. karelini

Binomial name
- Platyceps karelini (Brandt, 1838)

Synonyms
- Coluber karelini Brandt, 1838; Zamenis karelini — Strauch, 1873; Coluber karelini — M.A. Smith, 1943; Platyceps karelini — Nagy et al., 2004

= Platyceps karelini =

Species of snake

Platyceps karelini, also known commonly as the spotted desert racer, is a species of snake in the subfamily Colubrinae of the family Colubridae. The species is endemic to Asia.

== Geographic range ==
Platyceps karelini is found in Afghanistan, Iran, Kazakhstan, Kyrgyzstan, Tajikistan, Turkmenistan, and Uzbekistan.

== Habitat ==
Platyceps karelini is found in a variety of habitats, including shrubland, grassland, rocky areas, and dessert, at elevations of 1,600–2,000 m (5,200–6,600 ft).

== Description ==
Platyceps karelini exhibits sexual dimorphism, with females being larger than males. Females may attain a total length of 94 cm (37 in), including a tail 23 centimetres (9.1 in) long. Males may attain a total length of 83.5 cm (32.9 in), with a tail 22.5 cm (8.9 in) long.

Dorsally, it is pale gray or tan, with a series of black crossbars, which are narrower than the spaces between them. Some individuals lack the crossbars, and instead have an orange vertebral stripe. Ventrally, it is whitish, pinkish, or yellowish.

== Reproduction ==
Platyceps karelini is oviparous.

== Subspecies ==
There are three subspecies of Platyceps karelini which are recognized as being valid, including the nominotypical subspecies.

- Platyceps karelini chesneii (Martin, 1838)
- Platyceps karelini karelini (Brandt, 1838)
- Platyceps karelini mintonorum (Mertens, 1969)

Nota bene: A trinomial authority in parentheses indicates that the subspecies was originally described in a genus other than Platyceps.

== Etymology ==
The specific name, karelini, is in honor of Russian naturalist Grigory Karelin. The subspecific name, mintonorum, is in honor of American herpetologist Sherman A. Minton and his wife Madge Alice Shortridge Rutherford Minton.
