= Eremias scripta =

Conservation status
- Least Concern (IUCN 3.1)

Scientific classification
- Kingdom: Animalia
- Phylum: Chordata
- Class: Reptilia
- Order: Squamata
- Family: Lacertidae
- Genus: Eremias
- Species: E. scripta

Binomial name
- Eremias scripta (Strauch, 1867)

Species of lizard

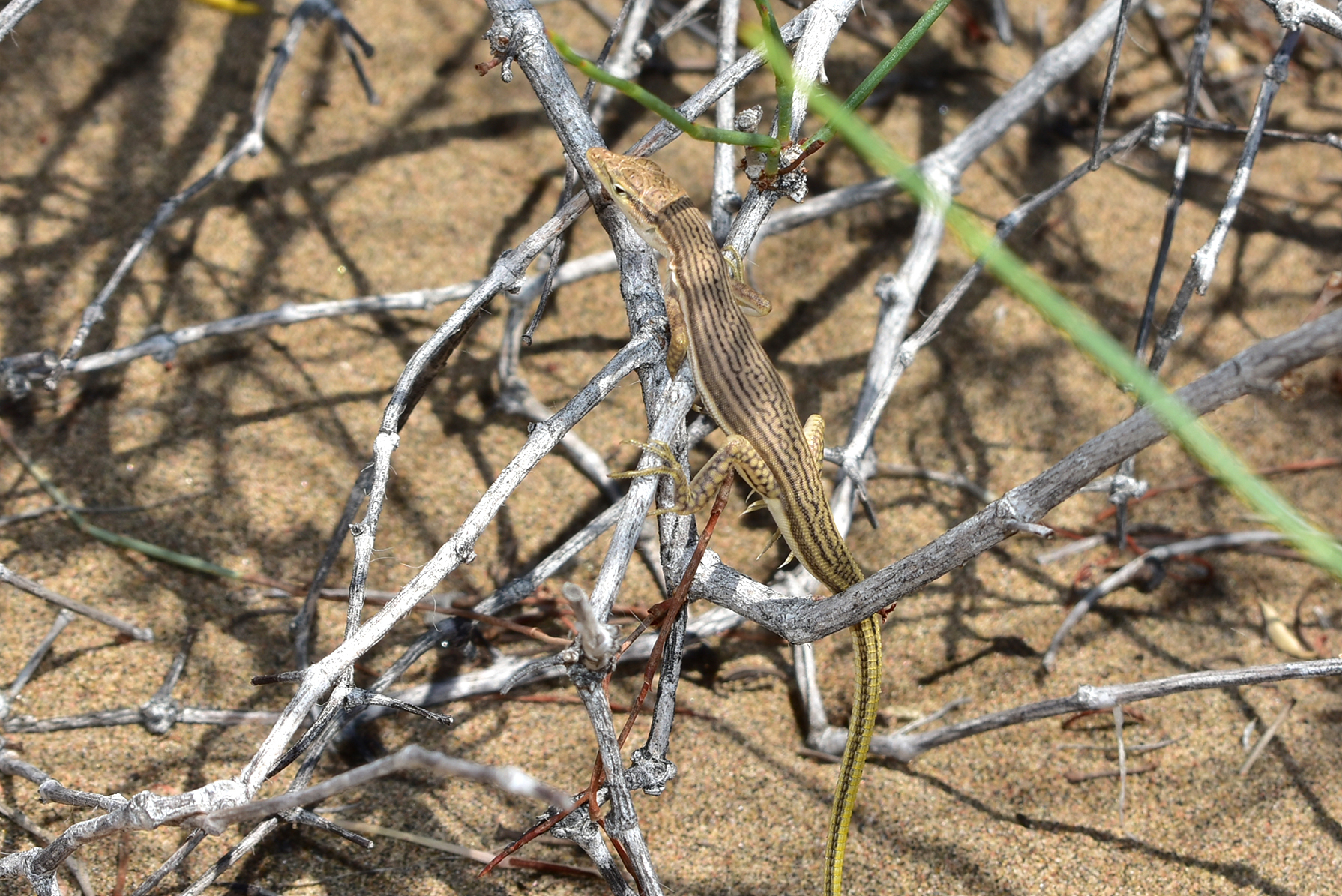
Eremias scripta

Eremias scripta (commonly known as the sand racerunner) is a species of lizard found in Kazakhstan, Turkmenistan, Iran, Afghanistan, Pakistan, Uzbekistan, Tajikistan, and Kyrgyzstan.
