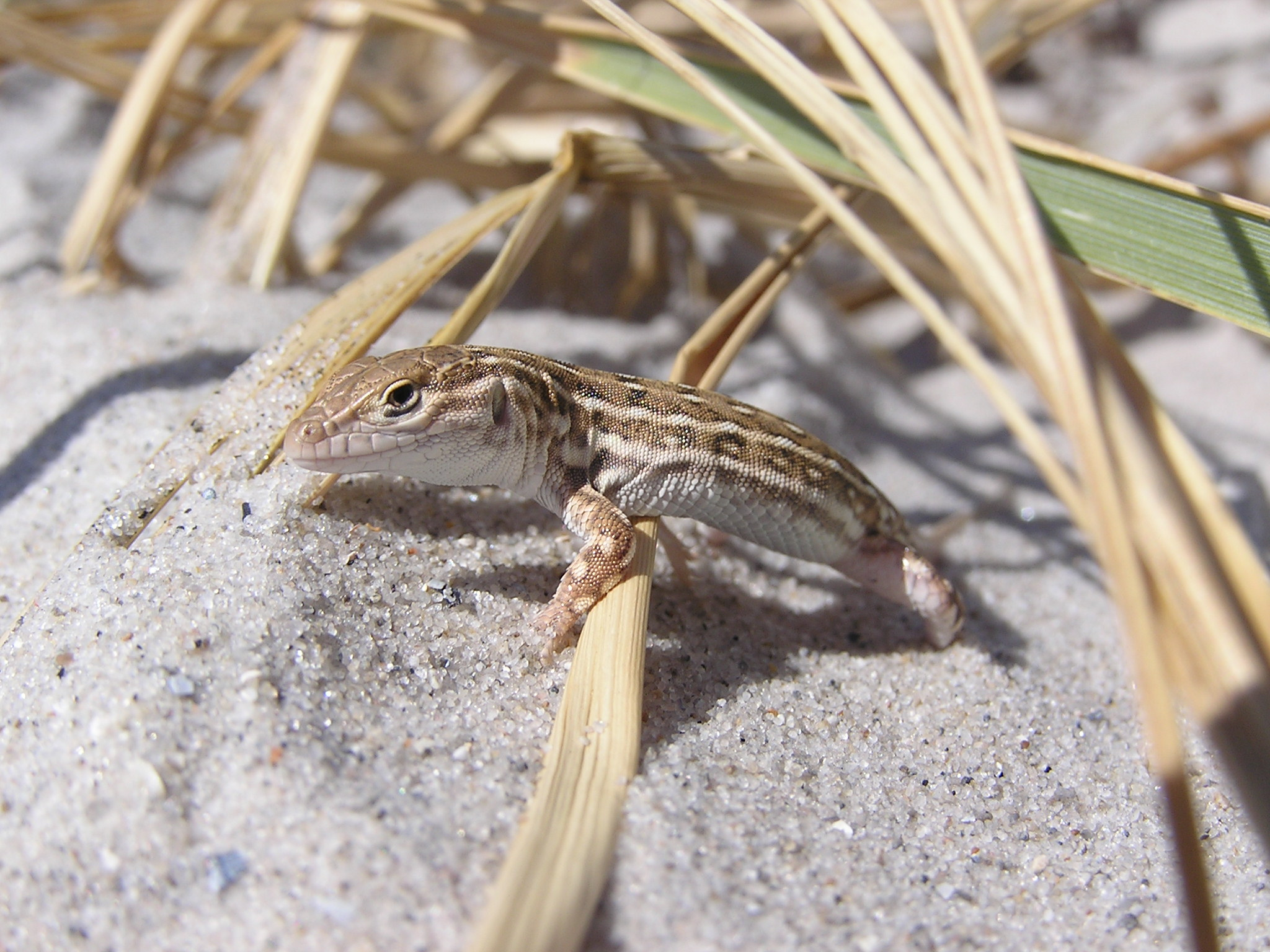

Conservation status
- Near Threatened (IUCN 3.1)

Scientific classification
- Domain: Eukaryota
- Kingdom: Animalia
- Phylum: Chordata
- Class: Reptilia
- Order: Squamata
- Family: Lacertidae
- Genus: Eremias
- Species: E. arguta

Binomial name
- Eremias arguta (Pallas, 1773)

= Steppe-runner =

Species of lizard

The steppe-runner (Eremias arguta) is a species of lizard found in Turkey, Romania, Iran, Russia, Azerbaijan, Kazakhstan, Armenia, Uzbekistan, Kyrgyzstan, Moldova, Ukraine, Georgia, Tajikistan, Mongolia, and China.
