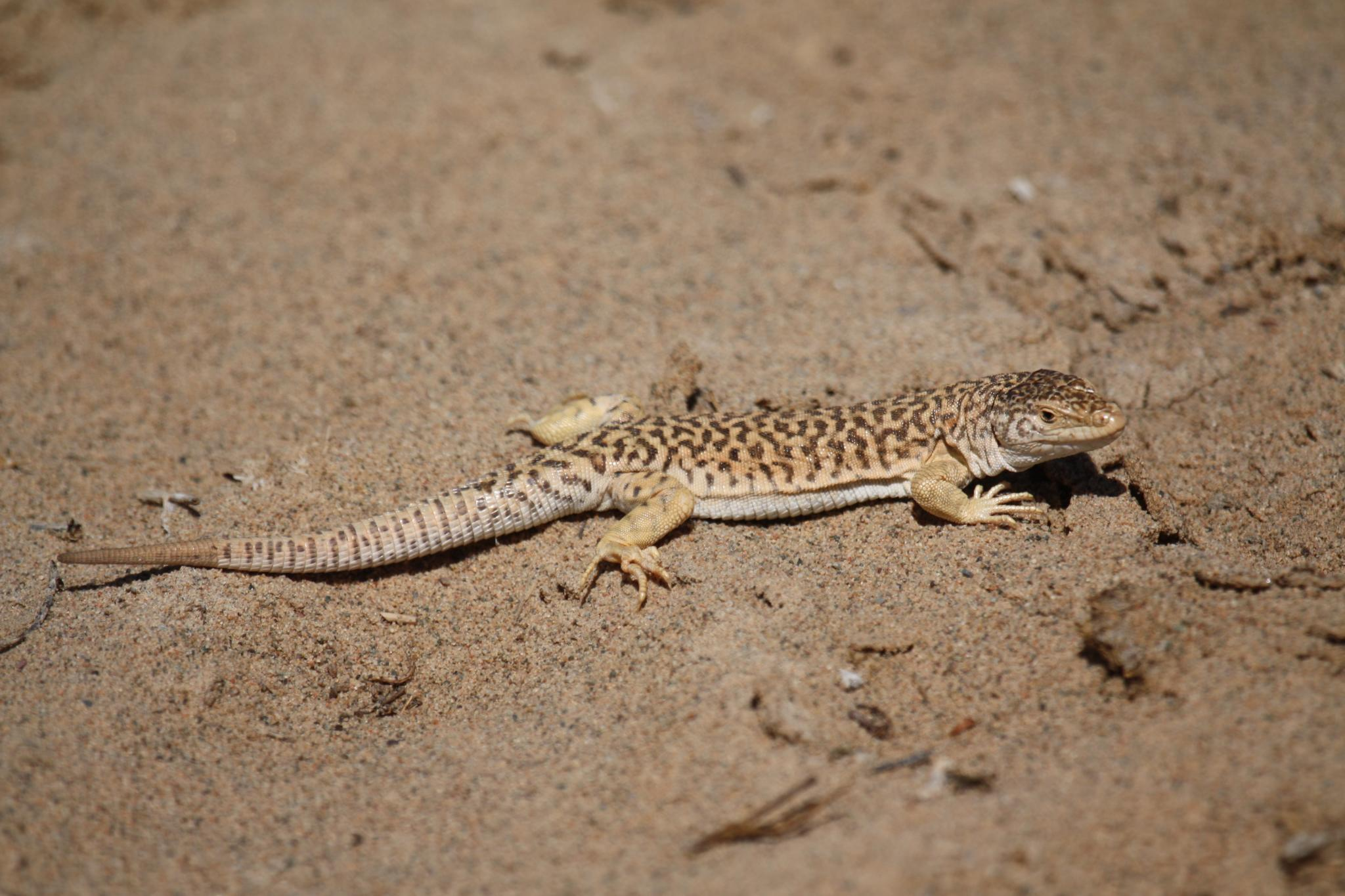
- Eremias przewalskii, Mongolia

Scientific classification
- Kingdom: Animalia
- Phylum: Chordata
- Class: Reptilia
- Order: Squamata
- Family: Lacertidae
- Subfamily: Lacertinae
- Genus: Eremias; Fitzinger, 1834

= Eremias =

Genus of lizards

Eremias is a genus of lizards in the family Lacertidae, the wall lizards. They are native to Asia and southeastern Europe, where they live in desert and steppe regions.

== Species ==
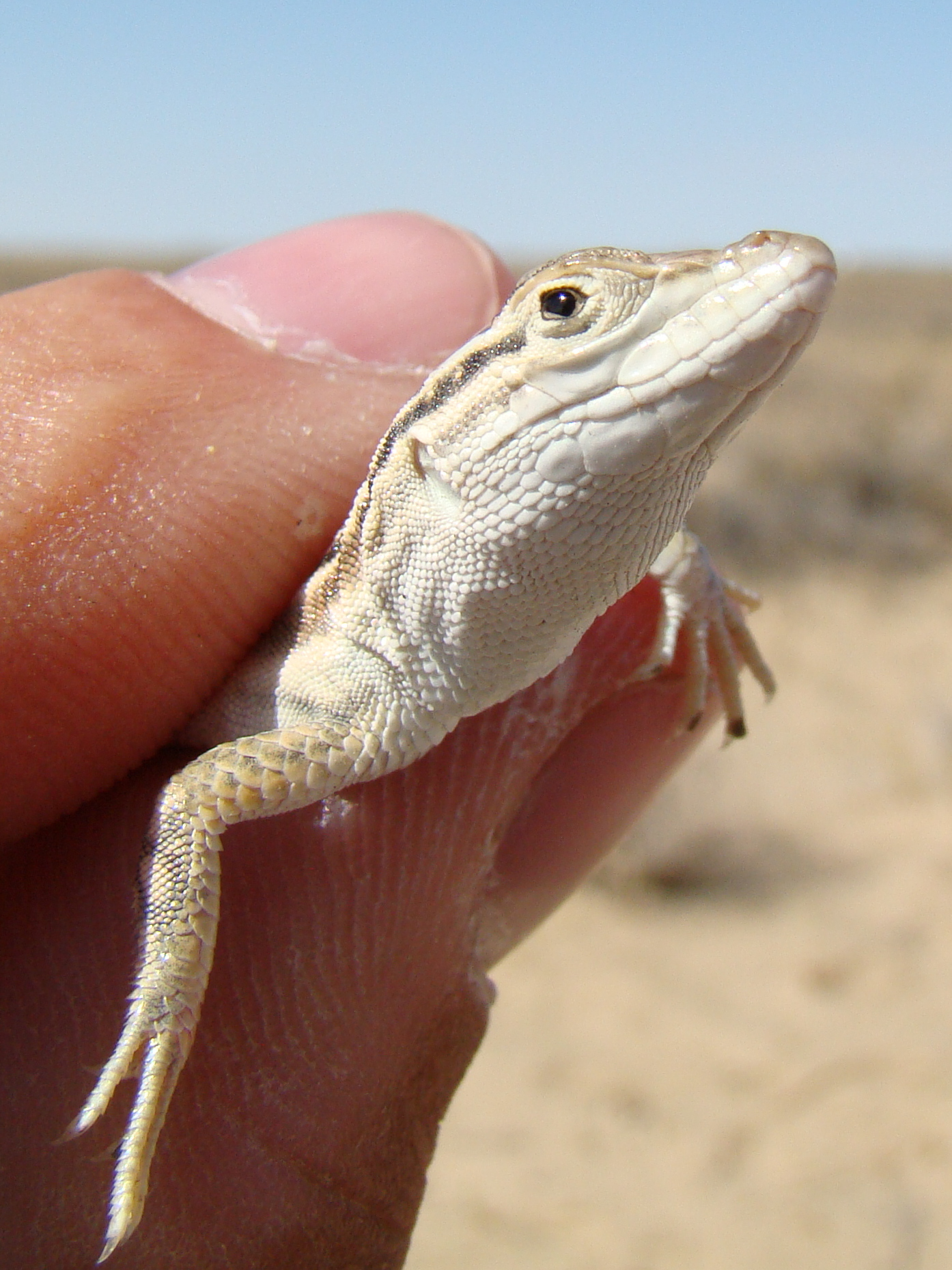
Eremias lineolata

The following 44 species are recognized.

- Eremias acutirostris (Boulenger, 1887) – point-snouted racerunner
- Eremias afghanistanica Böhme & Szczerbak, 1991 – Afghan racerunner
- Eremias andersoni Darevsky & Szczerbak, 1978 – Anderson's racerunner
- Eremias argus W. Peters, 1869 – Mongolia racerunner
- Eremias arguta (Pallas, 1773) – steppe-runner
- Eremias aria S.C. Anderson & Leviton, 1967
- Eremias brenchleyi Günther, 1872 – Ordos racerunner
- Eremias buechneri Bedriaga, 1906 – Kaschar racerunner
- Eremias cholistanica Baig & Masroor, 2006
- Eremias dzungarica Orlova, Poyarkov Jr., Chirikova, Nazarov, Munkhbaatar, Munkhbayar, & Terbish, 2017 – Dzungarian racerunner
- Eremias fahimii Mozaffari, Ahmadzadeh & Saberi-Pirooz, 2020- Fahimi's racerunner
- Eremias fasciata Blanford, 1874 – Sistan racerunner
- Eremias grammica (Lichtenstein, 1823) – reticulate racerunner
- Eremias graphica Orlova, Rasegar-Pouyani, Rajabizadeh, Nabizadeh, Poyarkov, Melnikov & Nazarov, 2023
- Eremias intermedia (Strauch, 1876)
- Eremias isfahanica Rastegar-Pouyani, Hosseinian, Rafiee, Kami, Rajabizadeh, & Wink, 2016 –
- Eremias kavirensis Mozaffari & Parham, 2007
- Eremias kakari Masroor, Khisroon, Khan, and Jablonski, 2020 – Kakar's racerunner
- Eremias killasaifullahi Masroor, Khan, Nadeem, Amir, Khisroon, & Jablonski, 2022 – Killa Saifullah's racerunner
- Eremias kokshaaliensis Jeremčenko & Panfilov, 1999
- Eremias kopetdaghica Szczerbak, 1972 – Kopet Dagh racerunner
- Eremias lalezharica Moravec, 1994 – Lalezhar racerunner
- Eremias lineolata (Nikolsky, 1897) – striped racerunner
- Eremias montana N. Rastegar-Pouyani & E. Rastegar-Pouyani, 2006 – mountain racerunner
- Eremias multiocellata Günther, 1872 – multi-ocellated racerunner
- Eremias nigrocellata Nikolsky, 1896 – black-ocellated racerunner
- Eremias nikolskii Bedriaga, 1905 – Kirghiz racerunner
- Eremias papenfussi Mozaffari, Ahmadzadeh & Parham, 2011
- Eremias persica Blanford, 1875
- Eremias pleskei Nikolsky, 1905 – Pleske's racerunner
- Eremias przewalskii (Strauch, 1876) – Gobi racerunner
- Eremias pseudofasciata Orlova, Rasegar-Pouyani, Rajabizadeh, Nabizadeh, Poyarkov, Melnikov & Nazarov, 2023
- Eremias quadrifrons (Strauch, 1876) – Alachan racerunner
- Eremias rafiqi Masroor, Khan, Nadeem, Amir, Khisroon, & Jablonski, 2022 – Rafiq's racerunner
- Eremias regeli Bedriaga in Nikolsky, 1905
- Eremias roborowskii (Bedriaga, 1912)
- Eremias scripta (Strauch, 1867) – sand racerunner
- Eremias strauchi Kessler, 1878 – Strauch's racerunner
- Eremias stummeri Wettstein, 1940 – Stummer's racerunner
- Eremias suphani Başoğlu & Hellmich, 1980 – Başoğlu's racerunner, Suphan racerunner
- Eremias szczerbaki Jeremčenko, Panfilov & Zarinenko, 1992 – Szczerbak's racerunner
- Eremias velox (Pallas, 1771) – rapid racerunner, rapid fringe-toed lizard
- Eremias vermiculata Blanford, 1875 – variegated racerunner, Central Asian racerunner
- Eremias yarkandensis Blanford, 1875 – Yarkand racerunner, Yarkand sandlizard
