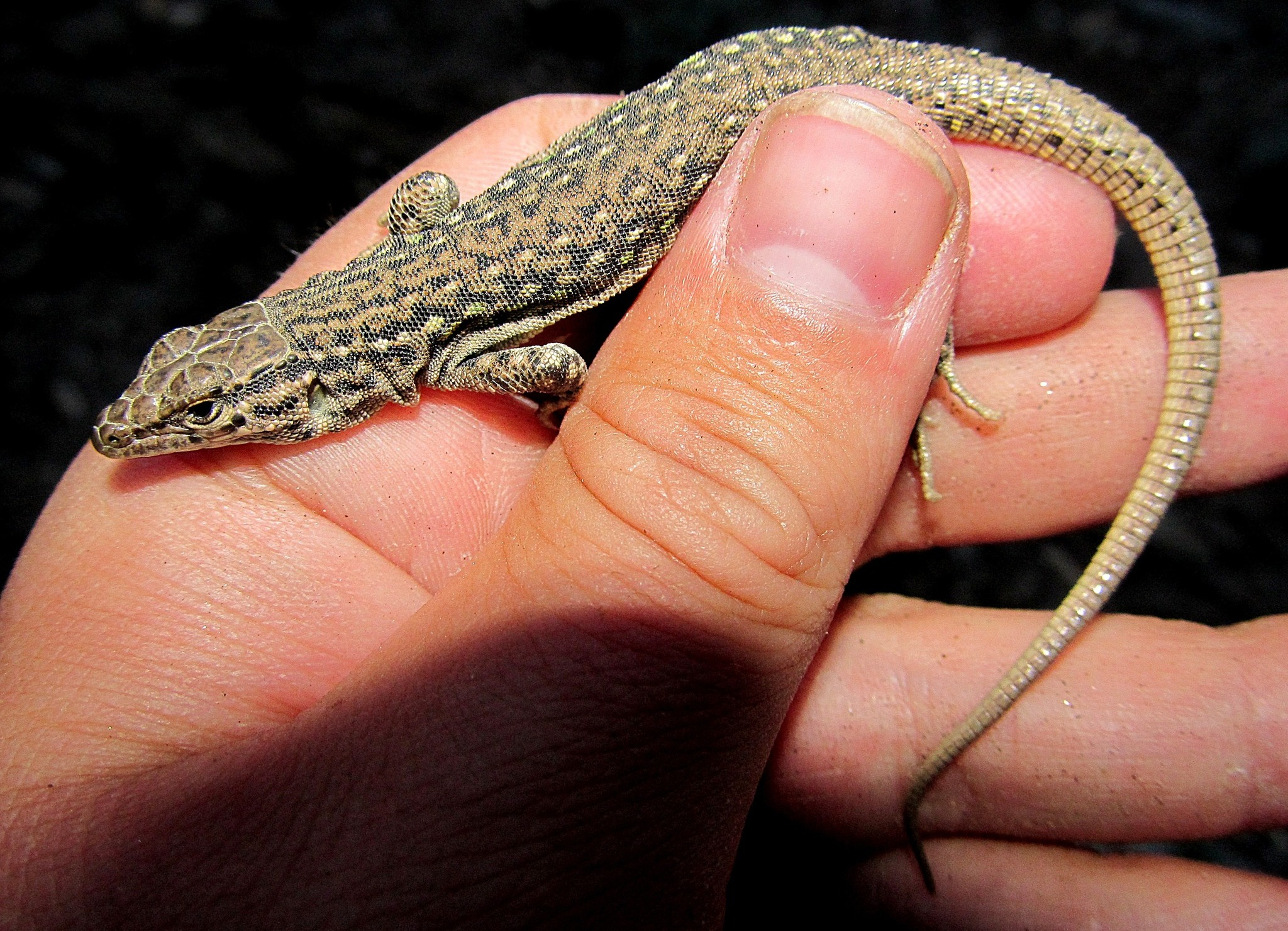

Conservation status
- Least Concern (IUCN 3.1)

Scientific classification
- Kingdom: Animalia
- Phylum: Chordata
- Class: Reptilia
- Order: Squamata
- Suborder: Lacertoidea
- Family: Lacertidae
- Genus: Eremias
- Species: E. multiocellata

Binomial name
- Eremias multiocellata Günther, 1872

= Eremias multiocellata =

Species of lizard

Eremias multiocellata, the multi-ocellated racerunner, is a species of lizard found in Mongolia, China, Kazakhstan, Kyrgyzstan, and Russia.
