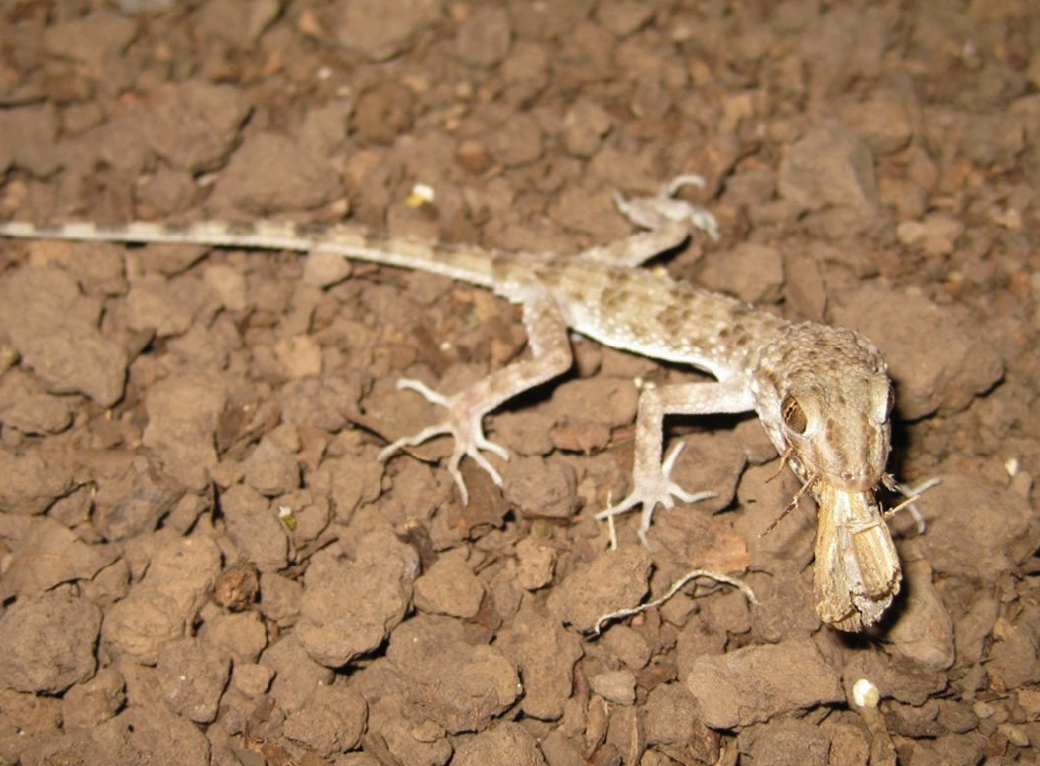

Conservation status
- Least Concern (IUCN 3.1)

Scientific classification
- Kingdom: Animalia
- Phylum: Chordata
- Class: Reptilia
- Order: Squamata
- Suborder: Gekkota
- Family: Gekkonidae
- Genus: Tenuidactylus
- Species: T. caspius

Binomial name
- Tenuidactylus caspius (Eichwald, 1831)
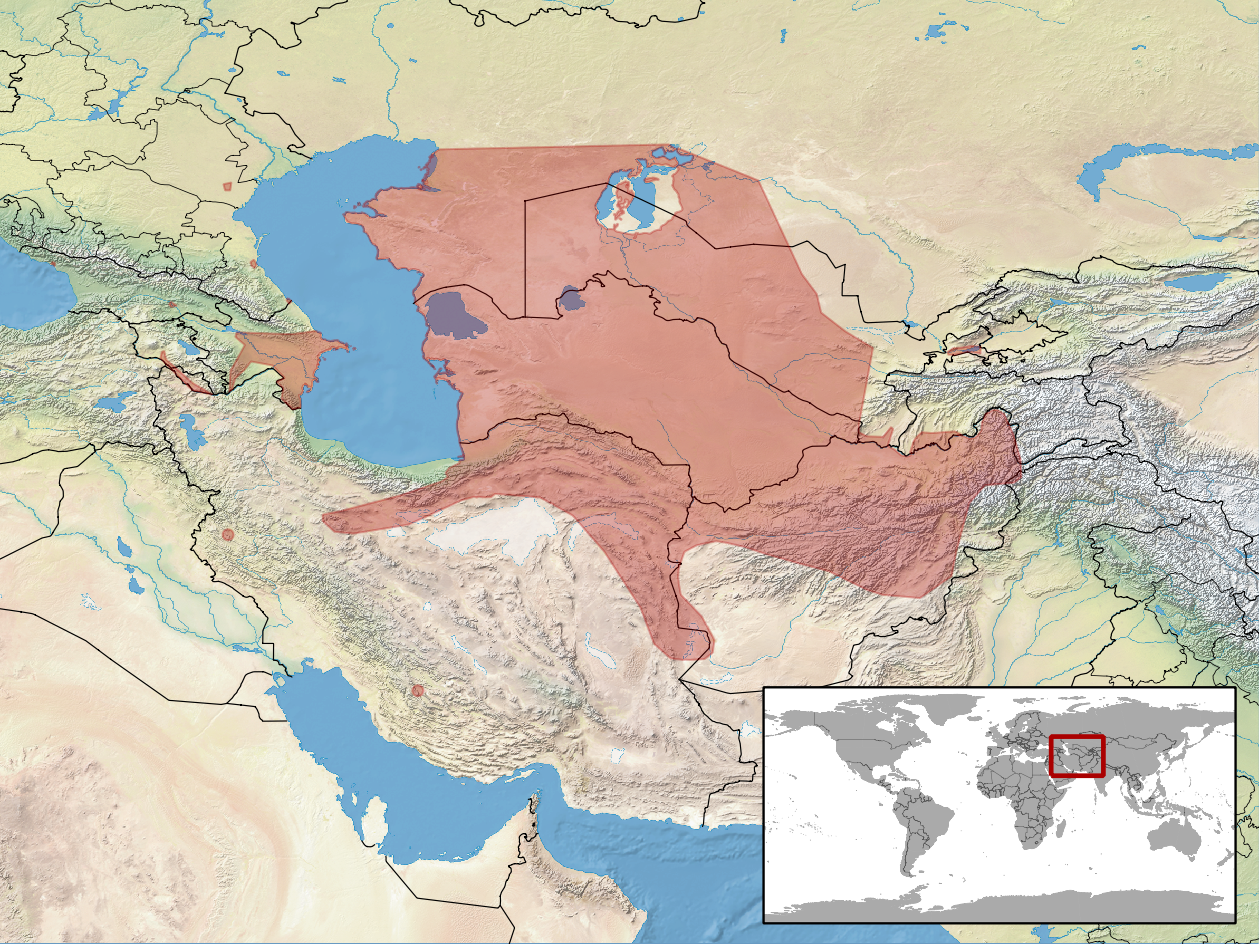

Synonyms
- Gymnodactylus caspius; Cyrtodactylus caspius; Cyrtopodion caspius; Cyrtopodion caspium

= Tenuidactylus caspius =

Species of lizard

Tenuidactylus caspius, also known as the Caspian bent-toed gecko or Caspian thin-toed gecko, is a species of gecko that ranges widely from southwestern Kazakhstan, southern Tajikistan, Turkmenistan and Uzbekistan west to southern Russia, Georgia, Armenia and Azerbaijan, south to Iran and northern Afghanistan.
