= Eremias vermiculata =

Scientific classification
- Domain: Eukaryota
- Kingdom: Animalia
- Phylum: Chordata
- Class: Reptilia
- Order: Squamata
- Family: Lacertidae
- Genus: Eremias
- Species: E. vermiculata

Binomial name
- Eremias vermiculata Blanford, 1875

Species of lizard

Eremias vermiculata (commonly known as the Central Asian racerunner or variegated racerunner ) is a species of lizard found in Mongolia, China, and Kazakhstan. Eremias velox is also sometimes known as the Central Asian racerunner.
