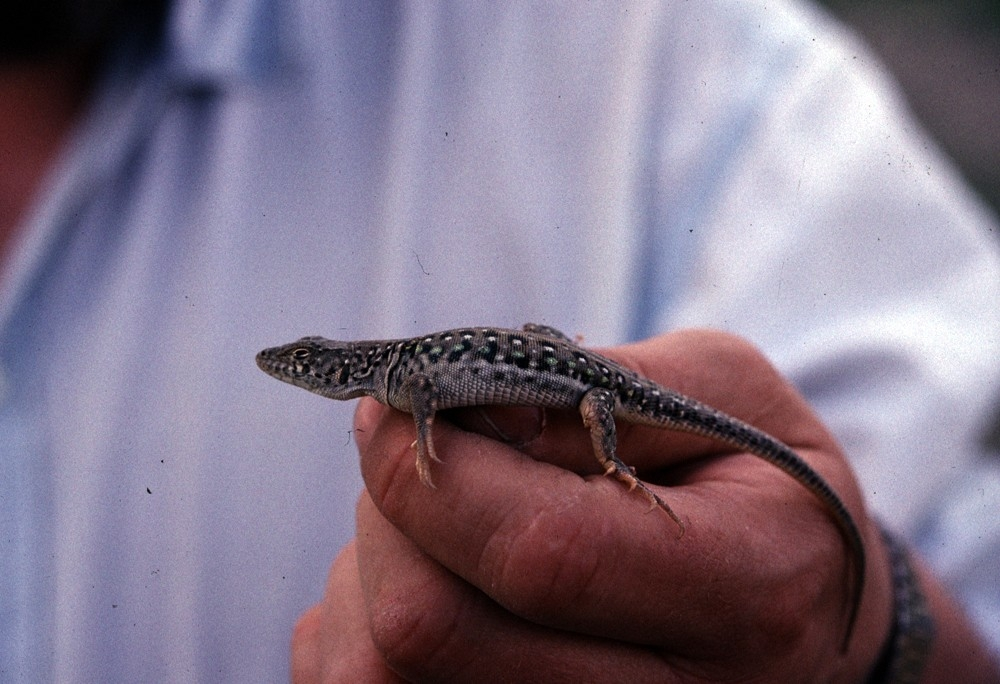

Conservation status
- Least Concern (IUCN 3.1)

Scientific classification
- Kingdom: Animalia
- Phylum: Chordata
- Class: Reptilia
- Order: Squamata
- Family: Lacertidae
- Genus: Eremias
- Species: E. strauchi

Binomial name
- Eremias strauchi Kessler, 1878

Synonyms
- Eremias strauchi Kessler, 1878; Eremias velox var. persica Boettger, 1886; Eremias velox (part) — Boulenger, 1887; Eremias velox var. strauchi — Bedriaga, 1912; Eremias velox strauchi — Nikolsky, 1913; Eremias strauchi — Engelmann et al., 1993; Eremias (Dimorphea) strauchi — Sindaco & Jeremčenko, 2008

= Eremias strauchi =

Species of lizard

Eremias strauchi, commonly known as Strauch's racerunner, is a species of lizard in the family Lacertidae. The species is native to Western Asia. There are no subspecies that are recognized as being valid.

== Etymology ==
The specific name, strauchi, is in honor of Russian herpetologist Alexander Strauch.

== Geographic range ==
E. strauchi is found in southern Armenia, southern Azerbaijan, northeastern Iran, and northeastern Turkey.

== Habitat ==
The preferred natural habitat of E. strauchi is shrubland, at altitudes of 300–3,500 m (980–11,480 ft).

== Longevity and size ==
Using the skeletochronological method, 18 adults of E. strauchi living in eastern Turkey were studied for longevity and size. The maximum observed longevity was 7 years for males and 5 years for females. The average snout–vent length (SVL) was 61.10 mm (2.406 in) for males and 60.82 mm (2.394 in) for females.

== Reproduction ==
E. strauchi is oviparous.
