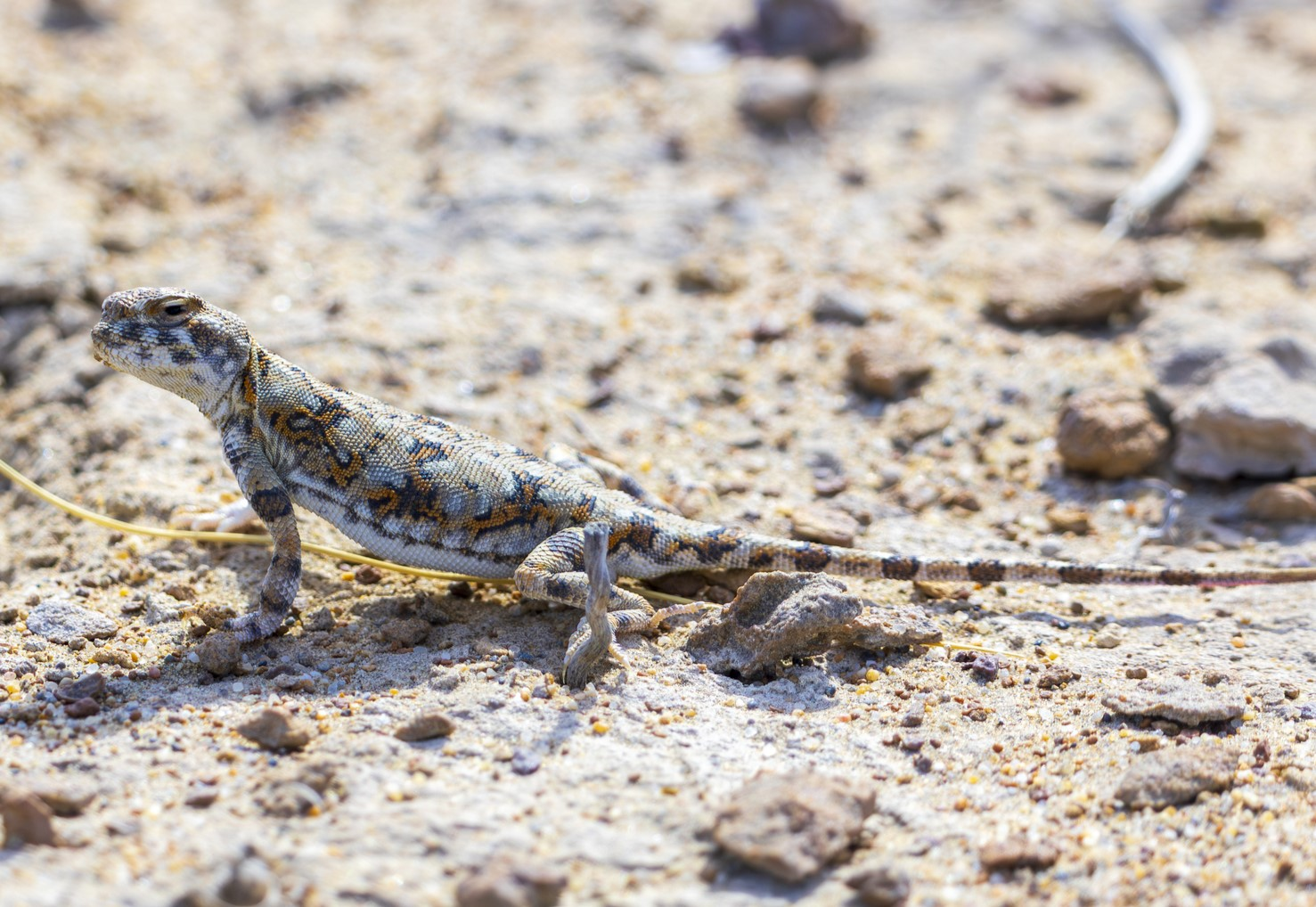

Conservation status
- Least Concern (IUCN 3.1)

Scientific classification
- Kingdom: Animalia
- Phylum: Chordata
- Class: Reptilia
- Order: Squamata
- Suborder: Iguania
- Family: Agamidae
- Genus: Phrynocephalus
- Species: P. reticulatus

Binomial name
- Phrynocephalus reticulatus Eichwald, 1831

= Phrynocephalus reticulatus =

Species of lizard

The reticulated toad-headed agama (Phrynocephalus reticulatus) is a species of agamid lizard found in Central Asia (Uzbekistan and Turkmenistan).

== Distribution ==
According to the IUCN Red List of Threatened Species assessment in 2016, this species is known only from Uzbekistan (the Kyzylkum Desert) and Turkmenistan (South Ustyurt and the Krasnovodskoye Plateau). Records from the Fergana Valley, Ladakh (India), and the Kashmir region are considered erroneous.
