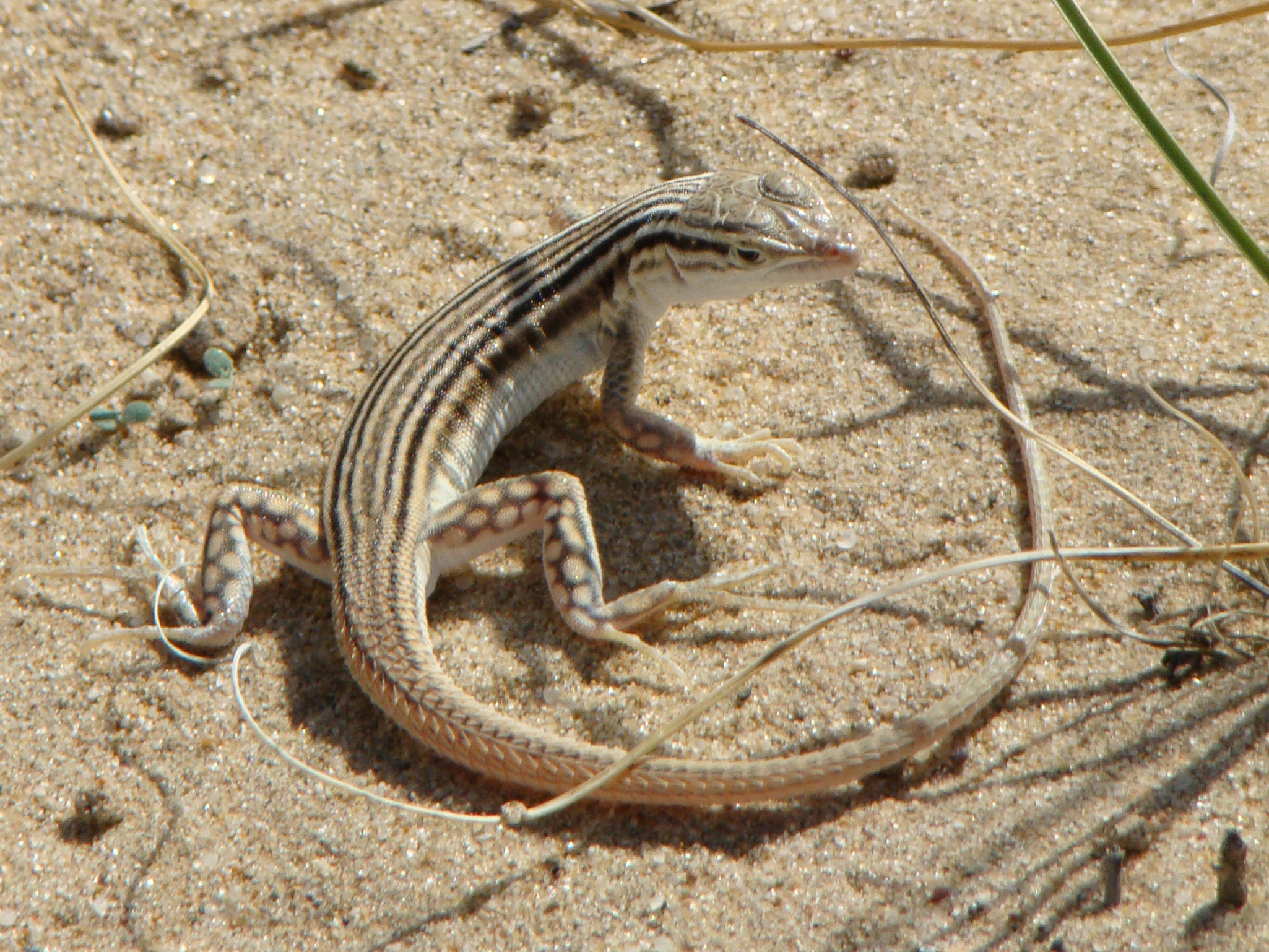

Conservation status
- Least Concern (IUCN 3.1)

Scientific classification
- Kingdom: Animalia
- Phylum: Chordata
- Class: Reptilia
- Order: Squamata
- Suborder: Lacertoidea
- Family: Lacertidae
- Genus: Eremias
- Species: E. lineolata

Binomial name
- Eremias lineolata (Nikolsky, 1897)

= Eremias lineolata =

Species of lizard

Eremias lineolata (commonly known as the striped racerunner) is a species of lizard found in Kazakhstan, Turkmenistan, Tajikistan, Uzbekistan, Iran, and Afghanistan.
