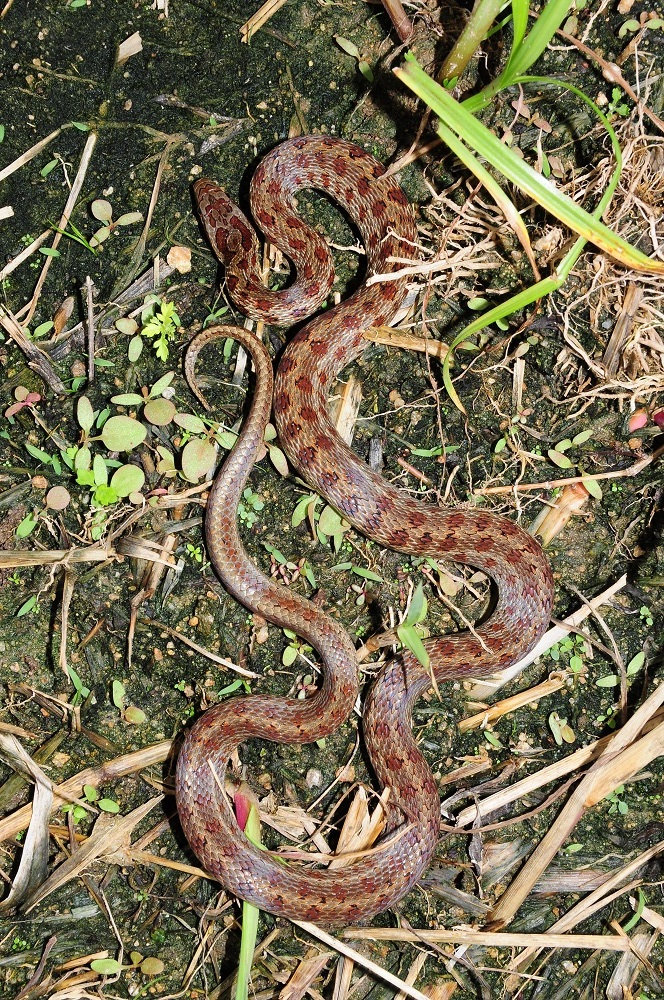

Conservation status
- Least Concern (IUCN 3.1)

Scientific classification
- Kingdom: Animalia
- Phylum: Chordata
- Class: Reptilia
- Order: Squamata
- Suborder: Serpentes
- Family: Colubridae
- Genus: Elaphe
- Species: E. dione

Binomial name
- Elaphe dione (Pallas, 1773)

Synonyms
- Coluber dione Pallas, 1773; Chironius dione — Fitzinger, 1826; Coelopeltis dione — Eichwald, 1841; Elaphis dione — A.M.C. Duméril, Bibron & A.H.A. Duméril, 1854; Elaphe dione — Stejneger, 1907

= Steppe rat snake =

Species of snake

Elaphe dione, commonly known as Dione's rat snake, the steppe rat snake, or the steppes rat snake, is a species of snake in the family Colubridae. The species is native to Asia and Eastern Europe. There are no subspecies that are recognized as being valid. A large specimen from Putyatin Island measured up to 90 cm (3.0 ft) in length.

== Etymology ==
The specific name, dione, refers to the Greek mythological figure Dione who was the mother of Aphrodite.

== Habitat ==
E. dione is found in eastern Ukraine, southern and southeastern Russia, Central Asia, Iran, Afghanistan, Mongolia, parts of China, and Korea. It is found in a wide variety of habitats including forest, shrubland, grassland, rocky areas, desert, freshwater wetlands, and disturbed areas, at altitudes from sea level to 3,580 m (2.22 mi).

== Behavior ==
An adult female mates with two or more males, sometimes copulating with two males at the same time. E. dione is oviparous, and adult females lay a clutch of 3–15 eggs in July or August, though some can lay a clutch of up to 24 eggs.
