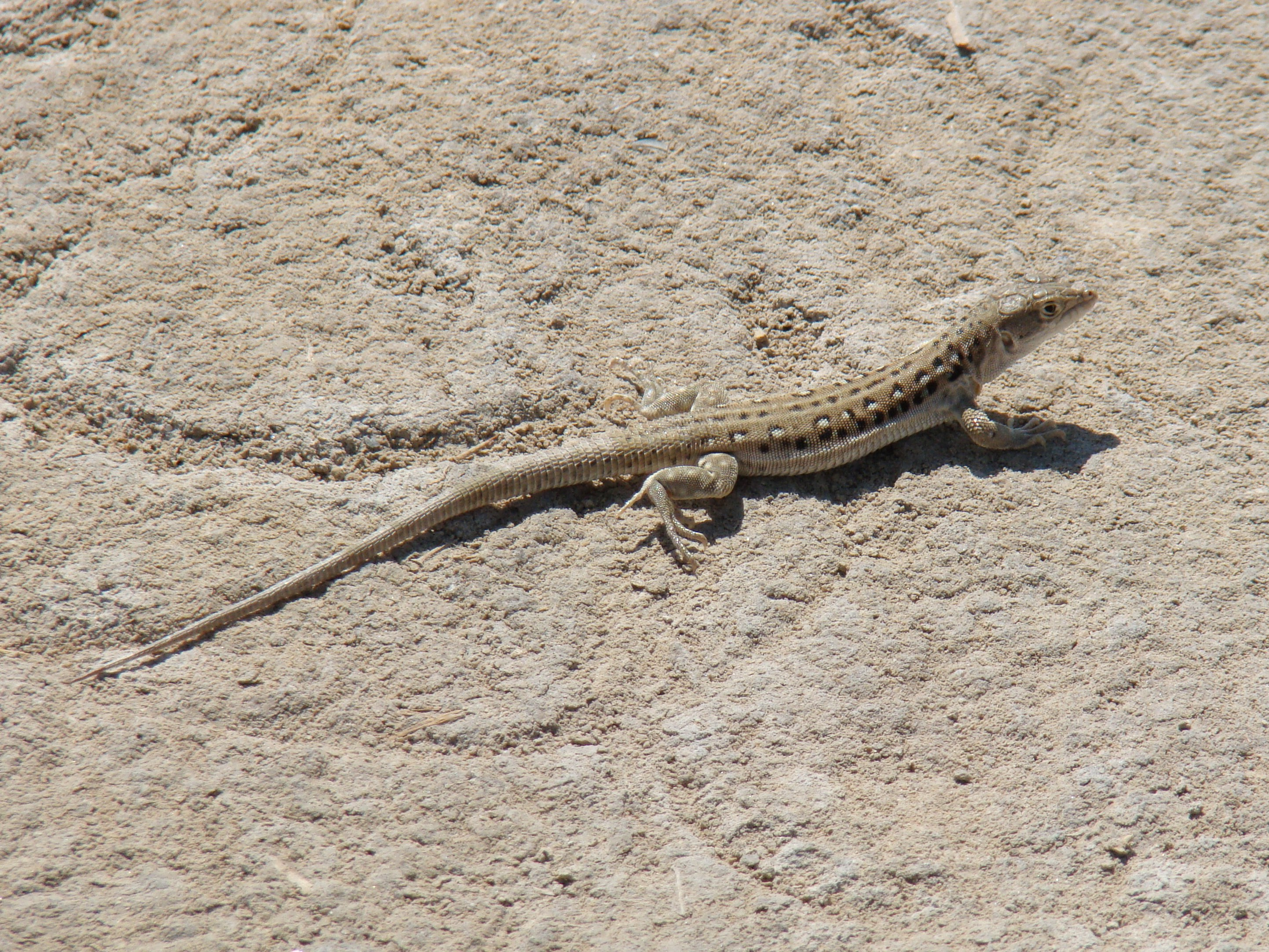

Conservation status
- Least Concern (IUCN 3.1)

Scientific classification
- Kingdom: Animalia
- Phylum: Chordata
- Class: Reptilia
- Order: Squamata
- Suborder: Lacertoidea
- Family: Lacertidae
- Genus: Eremias
- Species: E. velox

Binomial name
- Eremias velox (Pallas, 1771)

= Eremias velox =

Species of lizard

Eremias velox (commonly known as the rapid racerunner, Central Asian racerunner, or rapid fringe-toed lizard) is a species of lizard found in Kazakhstan, Turkmenistan, Tajikistan, Uzbekistan, Kyrgyzstan, Iran, Afghanistan, China, Russia, Azerbaijan, and Georgia. Eremias vermiculata is also sometimes known as the Central Asian racerunner.
