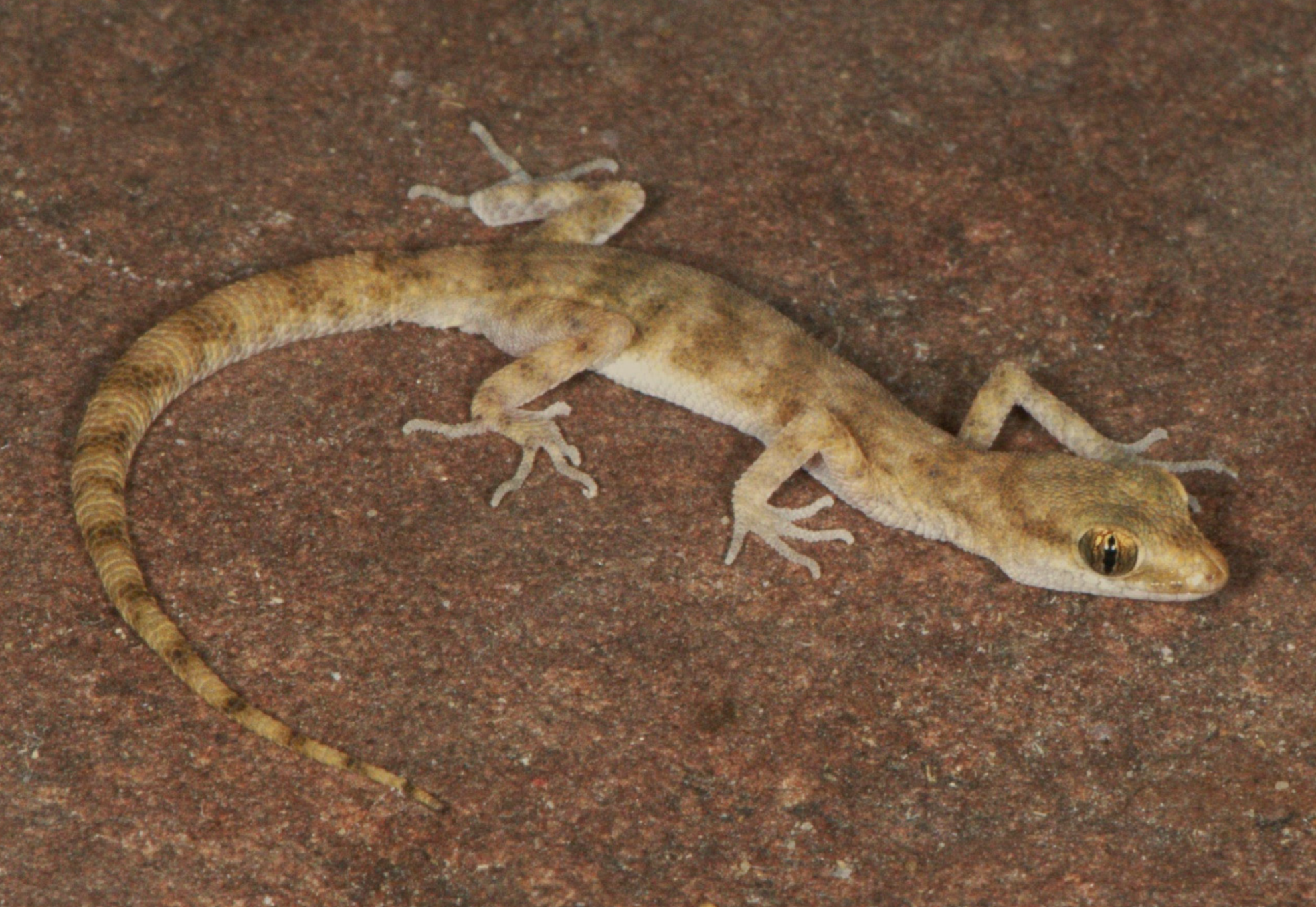

Conservation status
- Critically Endangered (IUCN 3.1)

Scientific classification
- Kingdom: Animalia
- Phylum: Chordata
- Class: Reptilia
- Order: Squamata
- Suborder: Gekkota
- Family: Gekkonidae
- Genus: Alsophylax
- Species: A. ferganensis

Binomial name
- Alsophylax ferganensis Nazarov, Abduraupov, Shepelya, Gritsina, Melnikov, Buehler, Lapin, Poyarkov & Grismer, 2023

= Alsophylax ferganensis =

Species of lizard

Alsophylax ferganensis, commonly known as the Fergana even-fingered gecko, is a species of gecko in the family Gekkonidae. It is the smallest gecko within the genus Alsophylax. It was discovered and described in 2023 in the Fergana Valley by Russian, American, and Uzbek herpetologists. Alsophylax ferganensis is a narrow-range endemic species restricted to the Fergana Valley in Uzbekistan.

== Etymology ==
The specific epithet ferganensis refers to the Fergana Valley, where this species was first discovered and to which it is currently known to be endemic.

== Description ==
Alsophylax ferganensis is a very small gecko, reaching a maximum body length of about 3.2 cm (excluding the tail). It has a narrow, teardrop-shaped head and a relatively slender, elongated body. The limbs are thin and long, especially the hind limbs. The tail is slightly longer than the body and somewhat swollen at the base. The body coloration is light beige with 5 to 7 dark brown bands crossing the back. These bands have uneven edges and are separated by gaps of approximately equal width. A similar striped pattern continues along the tail, with 7 to 10 dark stripes. A faint narrow loop-shaped marking appears on the neck. The legs also exhibit dark bands and irregular spots, while the underside is white. Fingers and toes are long and slender, featuring 13 to 15 narrow ridges (called lamellae) beneath the fourth finger and 14 to 18 beneath the fourth toe, aiding in grip. The fourth toe of the hind limb is the longest.

Alsophylax ferganensis differs from related species such as A. laevis, A. pipiens, A. loricatus, and A. tadjikiensis by its smaller body size, narrower head, elongated limbs, absence of enlarged dorsal tubercles (small raised bumps found on the backs of some geckos), and thinner, more evenly spaced dark bands on the back and tail.

== Discovery ==
Alsophylax ferganensis was discovered during a series of herpetological expeditions in Uzbekistan from 2019 to 2022 by an international team of scientists from the United States, Russia, and Uzbekistan. The team surveyed various habitats, including the Kyzylkum Desert, areas near the Afghanistan border, and the Fergana Valley, to obtain updated data on the distribution and abundance of several elusive gecko species, some of which had not been observed in decades. The expedition combined modern field methods and historical records, surveying areas along former routes and in habitats fragmented by human activity. Night surveys targeted geckos such as the southern even-fingered gecko (Alsophylax laevis), which had not been recorded in the region since 1963. Specimens of Alsophylax ferganensis were collected in 2021 by Timur Abduraupov and Roman Nazarov. The species was formally described in the peer-reviewed journal Animals in 2023.

== Habitat ==
This species inhabits clay-rich canyons with sandstone outcrops along the southern edge of the Fergana Valley. Vegetation in its habitat consists of shrubs and other xerophytic plants. Individuals are typically found on open hills with cracked, puffy soils and along canyon bottoms, often on bare ground.

== Distribution ==
Alsophylax ferganensis is currently known only from its type locality near the urban-type settlement of Shorssu in Fergana Region, Uzbekistan, close to the Kyrgyzstan border. The estimated distribution area is under 50 square kilometers, indicating a highly localized and possibly fragmented range. A similar population has been observed in the Pap Adyrs mountain range on the opposite side of the Fergana Valley, approximately 75 kilometers away, though the taxonomic status of this population remains unconfirmed.

== Biology ==
Very little is known about the biology or behavior of Alsophylax ferganensis. It is presumed to be insectivorous and primarily nocturnal or crepuscular. Its morphology and habitat preferences suggest adaptation to arid or semi-arid environments, likely seeking shelter under rocks or vegetation during the day.

== Conservation status ==
In 2025, Alsophylax ferganensis has been assessed for the IUCN Red List of Threatened Species and is listed as Critically Endangered under criteria B1ab(iii)+2ab(iii). Its extent of occurrence and area of occupancy are both estimated at 12 km². The population is estimated to consist of approximately 1,000–1,200 mature individuals and is considered to be declining.

The primary threat to A. ferganensis is habitat loss and degradation caused by expanding mining and quarrying activities, which may rapidly affect the entirety of its known range. More than 10% of its habitat has been lost since observations began in 2021. The species does not currently occur within a protected area, although conservation sites have been identified across its range.
