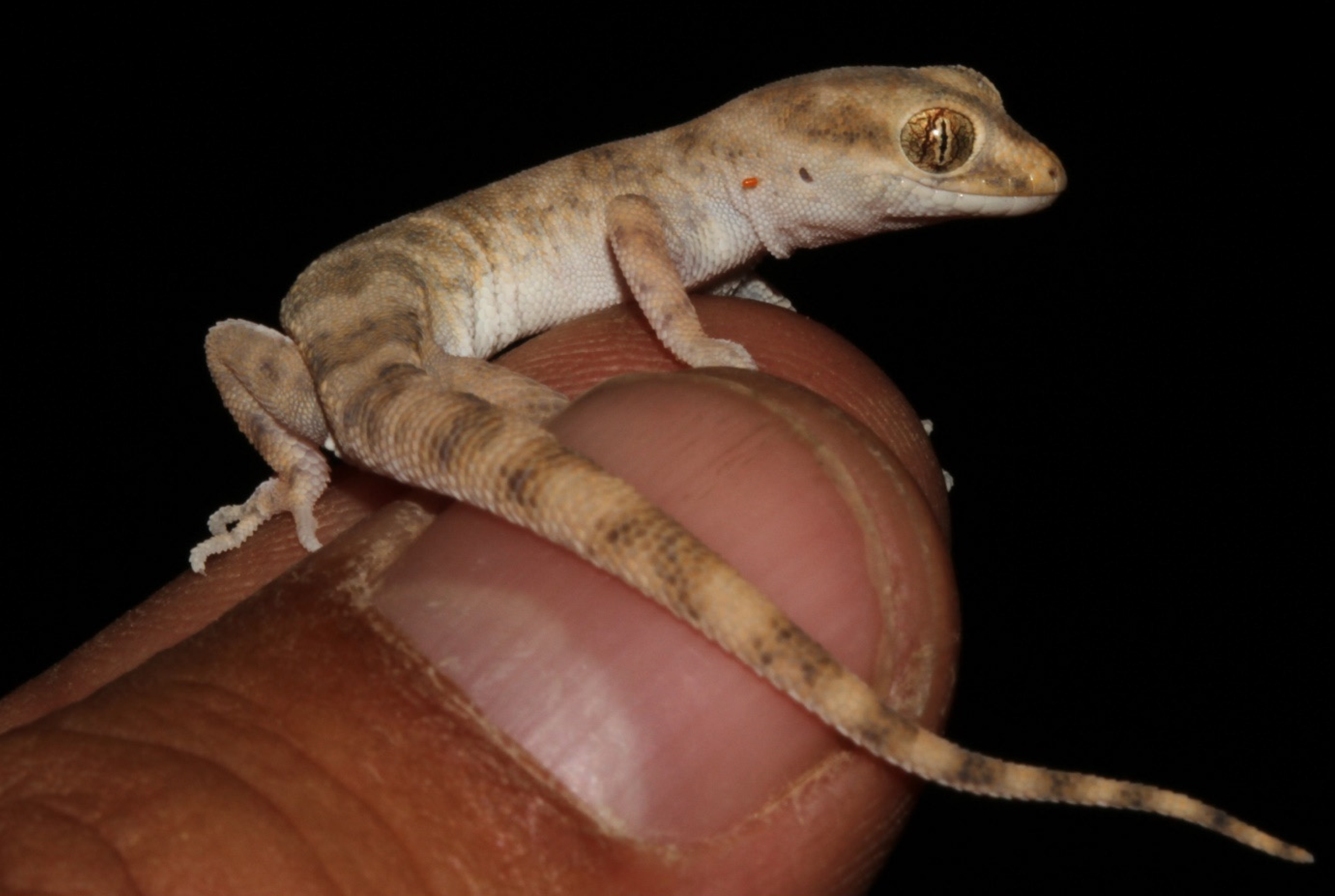

Scientific classification
- Kingdom: Animalia
- Phylum: Chordata
- Class: Reptilia
- Order: Squamata
- Suborder: Gekkota
- Family: Gekkonidae
- Genus: Alsophylax
- Species: A. emilia

Binomial name
- Alsophylax emilia Nazarov, Abduraupov, Shepelya, Gritsina, Melnikov, Buehler, Lapin, Poyarkov & Grismer, 2023

= Alsophylax emilia =

Species of lizard

Alsophylax emilia, commonly known as the Emilia’s even-fingered gecko, is a species of gecko in the family Gekkonidae, described in 2023 from northwestern Fergana Valley, Uzbekistan. It belongs to the genus Alsophylax, commonly referred to as even-fingered geckos. This species is part of a clade closely related to A. pipiens, A. laevis, and A. ferganensis, but differs from them by several distinctive morphological features. The species is known from a limited number of localities and is currently considered a narrow-range endemic of Uzbekistan.

== Etymology ==
The species is named emilia in honor of Emilia Viktorovna Vashetko (1940–2022), a Soviet and Uzbek herpetologist recognized for her significant contributions to the study of the herpetofauna of Uzbekistan and neighboring regions.

== Description ==
Alsophylax emilia is a small species of gecko distinguished by a combination of physical features and body proportions. It grows to a maximum body length (snout-to-vent length, or SVL) of about 3.5 cm, with the tail slightly longer than the body. The head is relatively large and well-defined from the neck, giving it a somewhat robust appearance. The eyes are small, with oval-shaped ear openings located behind them. The gecko’s back is covered in a mix of small scales and larger, flat, roundish bumps called dorsal tubercles. These tubercles are smooth and only up to 2.5 times the size of the surrounding scales, setting it apart from similar species. Unlike some of its close relatives, A. emilia has no strong lateral folds or prominent neck markings. It displays 5 to 6 dark, wide crossbands on its back and 11 similar bands on the tail. These bands are separated by narrow light spaces and give the gecko a striped appearance. On the underside, the gecko is white, and the tail features a distinct row of enlarged plates along the midline. The limbs are not especially long but are well-developed, with slender fingers and toes. The fourth toe is the longest and has 13–14 subdigital lamellae—narrow ridges that help the gecko grip surfaces. Males have 7 to 9 precloacal pores arranged in a V-shaped row near the base of the tail, a common feature in gecko species used for identification. In terms of coloring, the body is light beige, with darker brown crossbands that have uneven edges. The head has faint markings, but no striking spots or loops. The limbs also show irregular dark blotches. Alsophylax emilia is closely related to A. pipiens but can be distinguished by its smaller dorsal tubercles, fewer precloacal pores, and more pronounced crossband patterns. It also differs from other related species by the structure and placement of its scales, especially the larger plates on the underside of the tail and the small number of scales between its eyes.

== Discovery ==
Alsophylax emilia was discovered alongside A. ferganensis during a series of herpetological expeditions in Uzbekistan conducted between 2019 and 2022 by an international team of scientists from the United States, Russia, and Uzbekistan. The primary aim of the project was to gather data on the distribution, abundance, vocalizations, and genetic material of reptile species. The team surveyed a range of habitats, including the Kyzylkum Desert, the Fergana Valley, and areas near the Afghanistan border. These expeditions combined modern field techniques with historical data and focused on habitats fragmented by human activity. Specimens were collected in June 2022 by Roman Nazarov, Evgeniya Shepelya, Mariya Gritsina, and Polina Bogatova in the Kokand and Namangan regions, specifically near the Jildalisoy Reservoir and Yartepa village. The species was formally described in the peer-reviewed journal Animals in 2023.

== Habitat ==
This species inhabits clay canyons with rock outcrops and sparse vegetation, primarily consisting of shrubs. Such habitats are typical of arid foothill zones in the northwestern Fergana Valley, known locally as "adyrs".

== Distribution ==
Alsophylax emilia is currently known from several localities in the northwestern part of the Fergana Valley, including areas near the Jildalisoy Reservoir, Uygursay, and the vicinity of Yartepa village. All known sites are located within the Kokand and Namangan regions of Uzbekistan. Its precise distribution has not yet been fully established, and further surveys are required to determine whether the species occurs more widely within or beyond the Fergana Valley.

== Biology ==
Little is known about the biology of Alsophylax emilia. Like other members of its genus, it is presumed to be insectivorous and nocturnal or crepuscular in behavior. Its presence in arid foothill environments and body morphology suggest adaptations to dry, open habitats with minimal vegetation cover.

== Conservation status ==
As of 2025, Alsophylax emilia has not yet been assessed by the IUCN Red List. However, due to its limited known distribution and specific habitat preferences, it may be vulnerable to habitat degradation and other localized environmental threats. These threats are particularly significant given the ongoing expansion of agriculture, which is leading to further reduction, fragmentation, and degradation of the remaining natural ecosystems in the Fergana Valley. There is an urgent need to establish state-protected areas with IUCN Category I and II protection status to preserve the remaining suitable habitats.
