= Pedioplanis undata =

Conservation status
- Least Concern (IUCN 3.1)

Scientific classification
- Kingdom: Animalia
- Phylum: Chordata
- Class: Reptilia
- Order: Squamata
- Family: Lacertidae
- Genus: Pedioplanis
- Species: P. undata

Binomial name
- Pedioplanis undata (A. Smith, 1838)

Synonyms
- Lacerta undata A. Smith, 1838; Eremias undata — A.M.C. Duméril & Bibron, 1839; Mesalina undata — Szczerbak, 1989; Pedioplanis undata — Mayer, 1989

Species of lizard

Pedioplanis undata, known commonly as the plain sand lizard or the western sand lizard, is a species of lizard in the family Lacertidae. The species is endemic to Southern Africa.

== Geographic range ==
P. undata is found in southern Namibia and in South Africa (northwestern Cape Province).

== Description ==
P. undata is a small and slender species, closely resembling P. namaquensis. However, the lower eyelid of P. undata has a "window" formed by 2–4 semitransparent large scales. Adults of P. undata have a snout-to-vent length (SVL) of 4.5–5 cm (1.8–2.0 in), and the tail is very long, nearly three times SVL.

== Diet ==
P. undata preys upon small insects.

== Reproduction ==
P. undata is oviparous. Each hatchling has a total length (including tail) of 5.5–7.5 cm (2.2–3.0 in).
