= Short-limbed bend-toed gecko =

Scientific classification
- Domain: Eukaryota
- Kingdom: Animalia
- Phylum: Chordata
- Class: Reptilia
- Order: Squamata
- Infraorder: Gekkota
- Family: Gekkonidae
- Genus: Mediodactylus
- Species: M. brachykolon

Binomial name
- Mediodactylus brachykolon (Krysko, Rehman & Auffenberg, 2007)

Synonyms
- Altigekko brachykolon Cyrtopodion brachykolon

Species of lizard

The short-limbed bend-toed gecko (Mediodactylus brachykolon) is a species of gecko. The gecko is distinguished from others due to its distinctly short limbs, stout body and large head. In appearance it is similar to Altiphylax stoliczkai and Altiphylax baturensis. The name of the gecko comes from Greek brachys meaning short and kolon meaning limb.

These species currently have only been known to exist in north-western Pakistan (in Chitral and Swat). The species has been found in the Chir pine (Pinus roxburghii) forests and grasslands at elevations from 1200 to 1981 m.
