= A. loricatus =

A. loricatus may refer to:

- Abacetus loricatus, a ground beetle
- Abaporu loricatus, a synonym of Schultzsuchus loricatus, a prehistoric reptile
- Alsophylax loricatus, Strauch's even-fingered gecko, found in Central Asia
