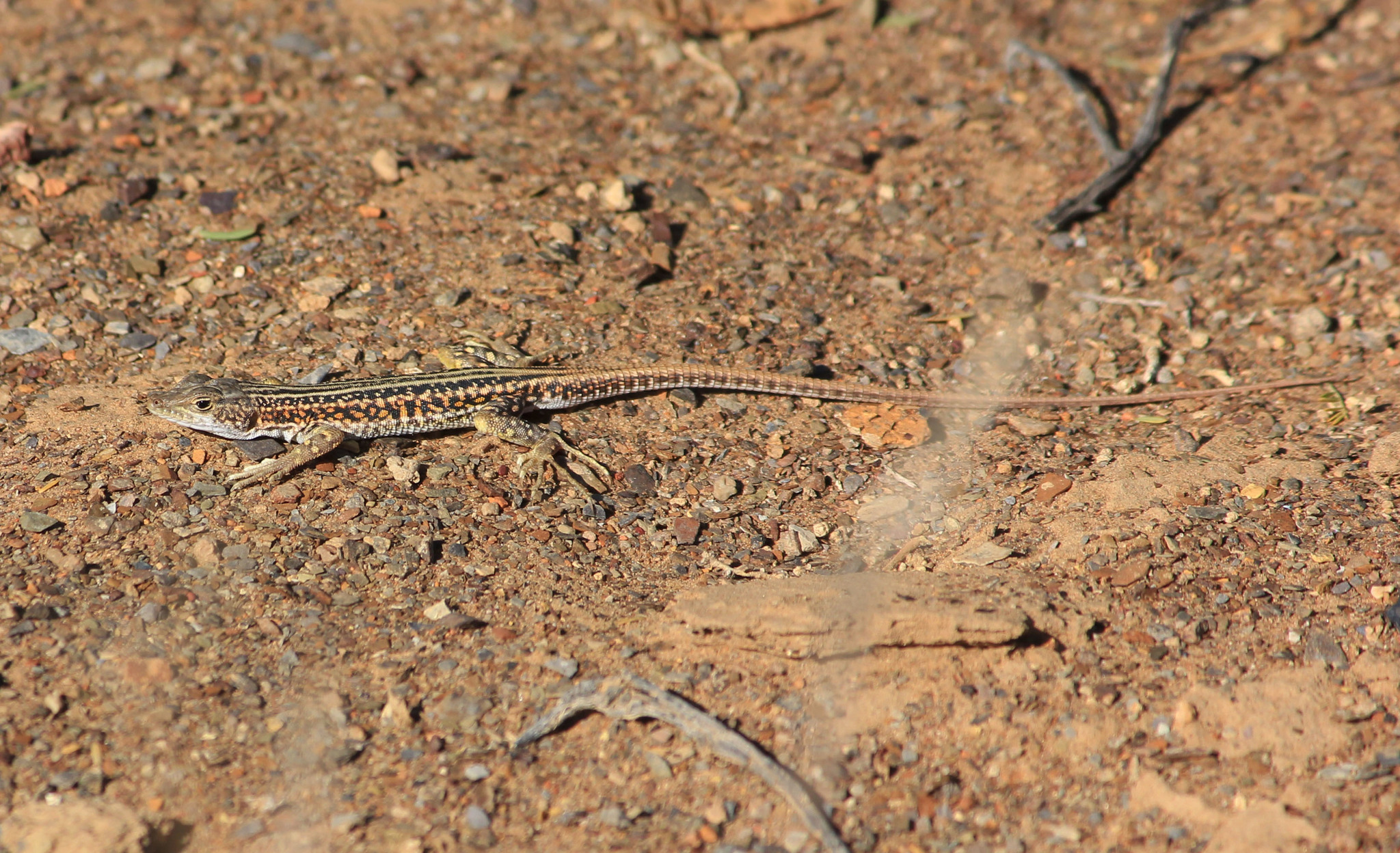

Conservation status
- Least Concern (IUCN 3.1)

Scientific classification
- Kingdom: Animalia
- Phylum: Chordata
- Class: Reptilia
- Order: Squamata
- Family: Lacertidae
- Genus: Pedioplanis
- Species: P. laticeps

Binomial name
- Pedioplanis laticeps (A. Smith, 1845)

Synonyms
- Eremias laticeps A. Smith, 1845; Mesalina laticeps Szczerbak, 1975; Pedioplanis laticeps Mayer, 1989

= Pedioplanis laticeps =

Species of lizard

Pedioplanis laticeps, known commonly as the Cape sand lizard or the Karoo sand lizard, is a species of lizard in the family Lacertidae. The species is endemic to Southern Africa.

== Geographic range ==
P. laticeps is found in southern Namibia and western South Africa.

== Habitat ==
The preferred natural habitat of P. laticeps is shrubland.

== Description ==
The coloration of P. laticeps is very variable. Adults have a snout-to-vent length (SVL) of 5–6 cm (2.0–2.4 in). There is no gular fold, and the nasals are not in contact with each other behind the rostral.

== Reproduction ==
P. laticeps is oviparous.
