= Pedioplanis gaerdesi =

Conservation status
- Least Concern (IUCN 3.1)

Scientific classification
- Kingdom: Animalia
- Phylum: Chordata
- Class: Reptilia
- Order: Squamata
- Family: Lacertidae
- Genus: Pedioplanis
- Species: P. gaerdesi

Binomial name
- Pedioplanis gaerdesi (Mertens, 1954)

Synonyms
- Eremias undata gaerdesi Mertens, 1954; Mesalina undata gaerdesi — Szczerbak, 1989; Pedioplanis undata gaerdesi — Mayer, 1989; Pedioplanis gaerdesi — Bauer, Branch & Haacke, 1993

Species of lizard

Pedioplanis gaerdesi, known commonly as the Kaokoland sand lizard, the Kaokoveld sand lizard, and Mayer's sand lizard, is a species of lizard in the family Lacertidae. The species is endemic to Namibia.

== Etymology ==
The specific name, gaerdesi, is in honor of German zoologist Jan Gaerdes (1889–1981), who lived in Namibia for many years.

== Geographic range ==
P. gaerdesi is found in northwestern Namibia.

== Habitat ==
The preferred natural habitat of P. gaerdesi is gravelly or sandy desert or savanna, at altitudes of 200–1,400 m (660–4,590 ft).

== Description ==
Adults of P. gaerdesi have a snout-to-vent length (SVL) of 4.5–5 cm (1.8–2.0 in). The tail is very long, almost three times SVL. Dorsally, P. gaerdesi is golden brown. Ventrally, it is cream-colored. The flanks are spotted with yellow. The transparent "window" of the lower eyelid, which consist of one large scale, is ringed with black.

== Reproduction ==
P. gaerdesi is oviparous.
