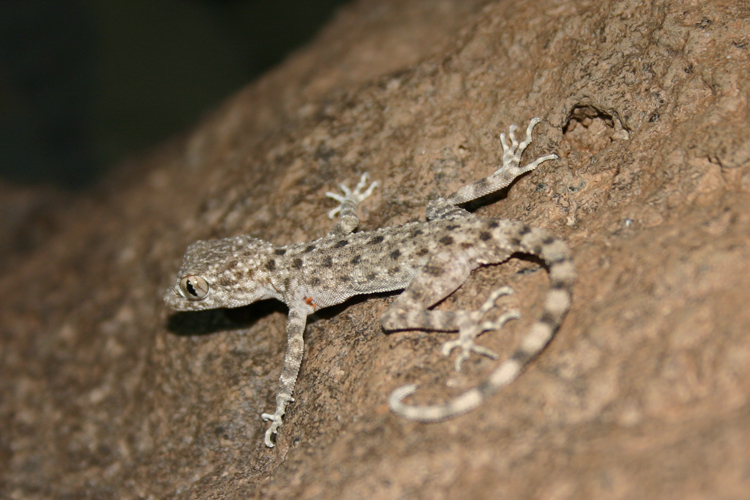
- Cyrtopodion longipes at Bazman, Iranshahr County, Sistan and Baluchestan Province, Iran

Scientific classification
- Kingdom: Animalia
- Phylum: Chordata
- Class: Reptilia
- Order: Squamata
- Suborder: Gekkota
- Family: Gekkonidae
- Subfamily: Gekkoninae
- Genus: Tenuidactylus; Szczerbak & Golubev, 1984

= Tenuidactylus =

Genus of lizards

Tenuidactylus is a genus of lizards in the family Gekkonidae (geckos). The genus contains eight species.

== Species ==
Species in the genus Tenuidactylus are:

- Tenuidactylus bogdanovi Nazarov & Poyarkov, 2013
- Tenuidactylus caspius (Eichwald, 1831)
- Tenuidactylus dadunensis (L. Shi & E. Zhao, 2011)
- Tenuidactylus elongatus (Blanford, 1875)
- Tenuidactylus fedtschenkoi (Strauch, 1887)
- Tenuidactylus longipes (Nikolsky, 1896)
- Tenuidactylus turcmenicus (Szczerbak, 1978)
- Tenuidactylus voraginosus (Leviton & S. Anderson, 1984)

Nota bene: A binomial authority in parentheses indicates that the species was originally described in a genus other than Tenuidactylus.
