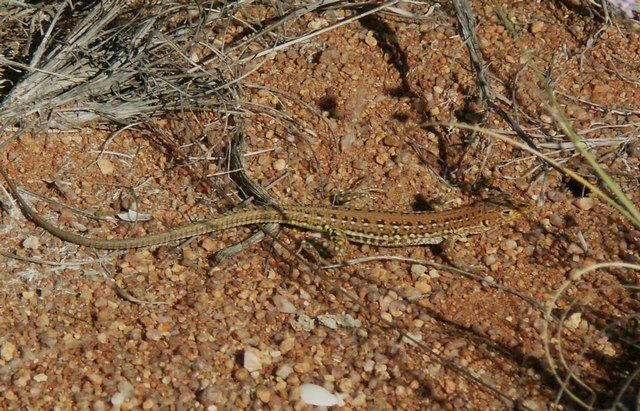

Conservation status
- Least Concern (IUCN 3.1)

Scientific classification
- Kingdom: Animalia
- Phylum: Chordata
- Class: Reptilia
- Order: Squamata
- Family: Lacertidae
- Genus: Pedioplanis
- Species: P. lineoocellata

Binomial name
- Pedioplanis lineoocellata (A.M.C. Duméril & Bibron, 1839)

Synonyms
- Eremias lineo-ocellata A.M.C. Duméril & Bibron, 1839; Pedioplanis lineoocellata — Arnold, 1986; Mesalina lineo-ocellata — Szczerbak, 1989; Pedioplanis lineoocellata — Mayer, 1989

= Pedioplanis lineoocellata =

Species of lizard

Pedioplanis lineoocellata, known commonly as the common sand lizard, the ocellated sand lizard, and the spotted sand lizard, is a species of lizard in the family Lacertidae. The species is endemic to Southern Africa. There are three recognized subspecies.

== Geographic range ==
P. lineoocellata is found in Botswana, Namibia, and South Africa.

== Description ==
Adults of P. lineoocellata have a snout-to-vent length (SVL) of 4.5–5.5 cm (1.8–2.2 in). The "window" in the lower eyelid is composed of two transparent scales, which are edged with black.

== Reproduction ==
P. lineoocellata is oviparous. The adult female lays a clutch of 4–8 eggs. Each egg measures on average 12.5 mm (0.49 in) by 9.5 mm (0.37 in). Each hatchling has a total length (including tail) of about 5.25 cm (2.07 in).

== Subspecies ==
Three subspecies of P. lineoocellata are recognized as being valid, including the nominotypical subspecies.

- Pedioplanis lineoocellata inocellata (Mertens, 1955)
- Pedioplanis lineoocellata lineoocellata (A.M.C. Duméril & Bibron, 1839)
- Pedioplanis lineoocellata pulchella (Gray, 1845)

Nota bene: A trinomial authority in parentheses indicates that the subspecies was originally described in a genus other than Pedioplanis.
