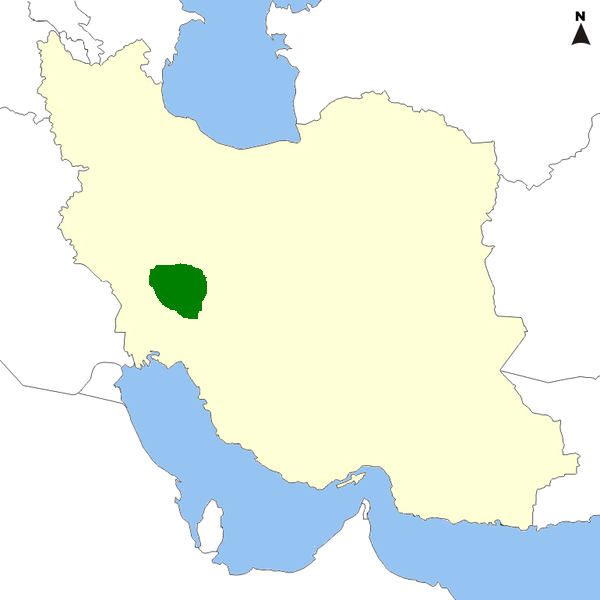
- Microgecko persicus bakhtiari's distribution in Iran

Scientific classification
- Kingdom: Animalia
- Phylum: Chordata
- Class: Reptilia
- Order: Squamata
- Suborder: Gekkota
- Family: Gekkonidae
- Genus: Microgecko
- Species: M. persicus

Binomial name
- Microgecko persicus (Nikolsky, 1903)

Synonyms
- Alsophylax persicus Nikolsky, 1903; Bunopus persicus; Cyrtodactylus persicus; Tropiocolotes persicus; Tropiocolotes (Microgecko) persicus

= Microgecko persicus =

Species of lizard

Microgecko persicus, known as the Persia sand gecko or Persian dwarf gecko, is a species of lizard in the family Gekkonidae. The species is endemic to Iran, Iraq and Pakistan. As of January 2019 its conservation status has not been assessed on the IUCN Red List.

== Taxonomy ==
The Persia sand gecko was first formally described in 1903 by Alexander Nikolsky as Alsophylax persicus. It has since been placed in several genera, including Cyrtodactylus, Bunopus, and Tropiocolotes.

There are three accepted subspecies:

- Microgecko persicus bakhtiari Minton, Anderson, & Anderson, 1970
- Microgecko persicus euphorbiacola Minton, Anderson, & Anderson, 1970
- Microgecko persicus persicus (Nikolsky, 1903)

The common names refers to its distribution in Persia (now Iran).
