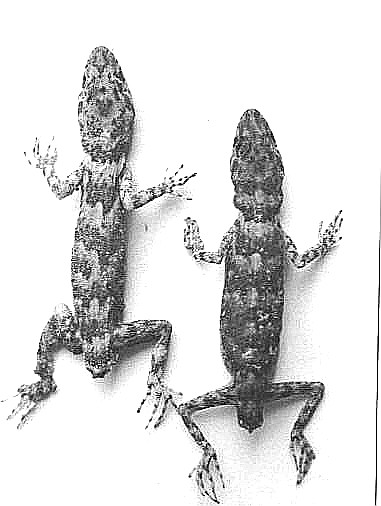
- Altiphylax baturensis

Scientific classification
- Kingdom: Animalia
- Phylum: Chordata
- Class: Reptilia
- Order: Squamata
- Suborder: Gekkota
- Family: Gekkonidae
- Genus: Altiphylax; Yeriomtschenko & Shcherbak, 1984

Species
- Five, see text.

= Altiphylax =

Genus of lizards

Altiphylax is a genus of small species of geckos, lizards in the family Gekkonidae. Species of the genus are endemic to Central Asia.

== Species ==
The following five species are recognized as being valid:

- Altiphylax baturensis (Khan & Baig, 1992) – Batura Glacier gecko
- Altiphylax levitoni (Golubev & Szczerbak, 1979) – Leviton's gecko
- Altiphylax mintoni (Golubev & Szczerbak, 1981)
- Altiphylax stoliczkai (Steindachner, 1867)
- Altiphylax tokobajevi (Jeremčenko & Szczerbak, 1984)

Nota bene: A binomial authority in parentheses indicates that the species was originally described in a genus other than Altiphylax.
