= Pedioplanis benguelensis =

Scientific classification
- Kingdom: Animalia
- Phylum: Chordata
- Class: Reptilia
- Order: Squamata
- Family: Lacertidae
- Genus: Pedioplanis
- Species: P. benguelensis

Binomial name
- Pedioplanis benguelensis (Bocage, 1867)

Synonyms
- Eremias benguelensis [sic] Bocage, 1867; Eremias benguellensis — Boulenger, 1918; Pedioplanis benguellensis — Arnold, 1989; Mesalina benguelensis — Szczerbak, 1989; Pedioplanis benguellensis — Bauer & R. Günther, 1995

Species of lizard

Pedioplanis bengulensis, known commonly as the Angolan sand lizard or Bocage's sand lizard, is a species of lizard in the family Lacertidae. The species is endemic to Southern Africa.

== Geographic range ==
P. benguelensis is found in Angola and Namibia.

== Reproduction ==
P. benguelensis is oviparous.
