= Pedioplanis breviceps =

Conservation status
- Least Concern (IUCN 3.1)

Scientific classification
- Kingdom: Animalia
- Phylum: Chordata
- Class: Reptilia
- Order: Squamata
- Family: Lacertidae
- Genus: Pedioplanis
- Species: P. breviceps

Binomial name
- Pedioplanis breviceps (Sternfeld, 1911)

Synonyms
- Eremias breviceps Sternfeld, 1911; Mesalina breviceps — Szczerbak, 1989; Pedioplanis breviceps — Mayer, 1989

Species of lizard

Pedioplanis breviceps, known commonly as the short-headed sand lizard, the short-headed sandveld lizard, and Sternfeld's sand lizard, is a species of lizard in the family Lacertidae. The species is endemic to Namibia.

== Geographic range ==
P. breviceps is found in northwestern Namibia.

== Habitat ==
The preferred natural habitat of P. breviceps is desert.

== Description ==
P. breviceps is a small species for its genus. It has a short head, to which the specific name, breviceps, refers. Adults have a snout-to-vent length (SVL) of 4.5–5.5 cm (1.8–2.2 in). The lower eyelid is scaly and opaque, without a "window". There is sexual dimorphism in coloration: adult females and juveniles have distinct dark dorsal stripes, but adult males are uniformly brown dorsally.

== Reproduction ==
P. breviceps is oviparous. An adult female may lay a clutch of 2–4 eggs. Each egg measures 11 mm (0.43 in) by 6 mm (0.24 in). Each hatchling has a total length (including tail) of 5–8 cm (2.0–3.1 in).
