= Microgecko =

Scientific classification
- Kingdom: Animalia
- Phylum: Chordata
- Class: Reptilia
- Order: Squamata
- Suborder: Gekkota
- Family: Gekkonidae
- Genus: Microgecko; Nikolsky, 1907

Diversity
- 8 species, see text.

Genus of lizards

Microgecko is a genus of gecko (a type of lizard) in the family Gekkonidae. The genus is endemic to continental Asia.

== Species ==
The genus Microgecko comprises 8 species which are recognized as being valid.

- Microgecko chabaharensis Gholamifard, N. Rastegar-Pouyani, E. Rastegar-Pouyani, Khosravani, Yousefkhani & Oraei, 2015 — Chabahar dwarf gecko
- Microgecko depressus (Minton & J.A. Anderson, 1965) — low-lying gecko
- Microgecko helenae Nikolsky, 1907 — Khuzestan dwarf gecko, banded dwarf Gecko, Helen's banded dwarf gecko
- Microgecko laki Torki, 2020 — Laki dwarf gecko
- Microgecko latifi (Leviton & S.C. Anderson, 1972) — Latifi's dwarf gecko
- Microgecko persicus (Nikolsky, 1903) – Persian dwarf gecko, Persian sand gecko
- Microgecko tanishpaensis Masroor, Khisroon, Khan, & Jablonski, 2020 – Tanishpa's dwarf gecko
- Microgecko varaviensis Gholamifard, Rastegar-Pouyani, & Rastegar-Pouyani, 2019

Nota bene: A binomial authority in parentheses indicates that the species was originally described in a genus other than Microgecko.
