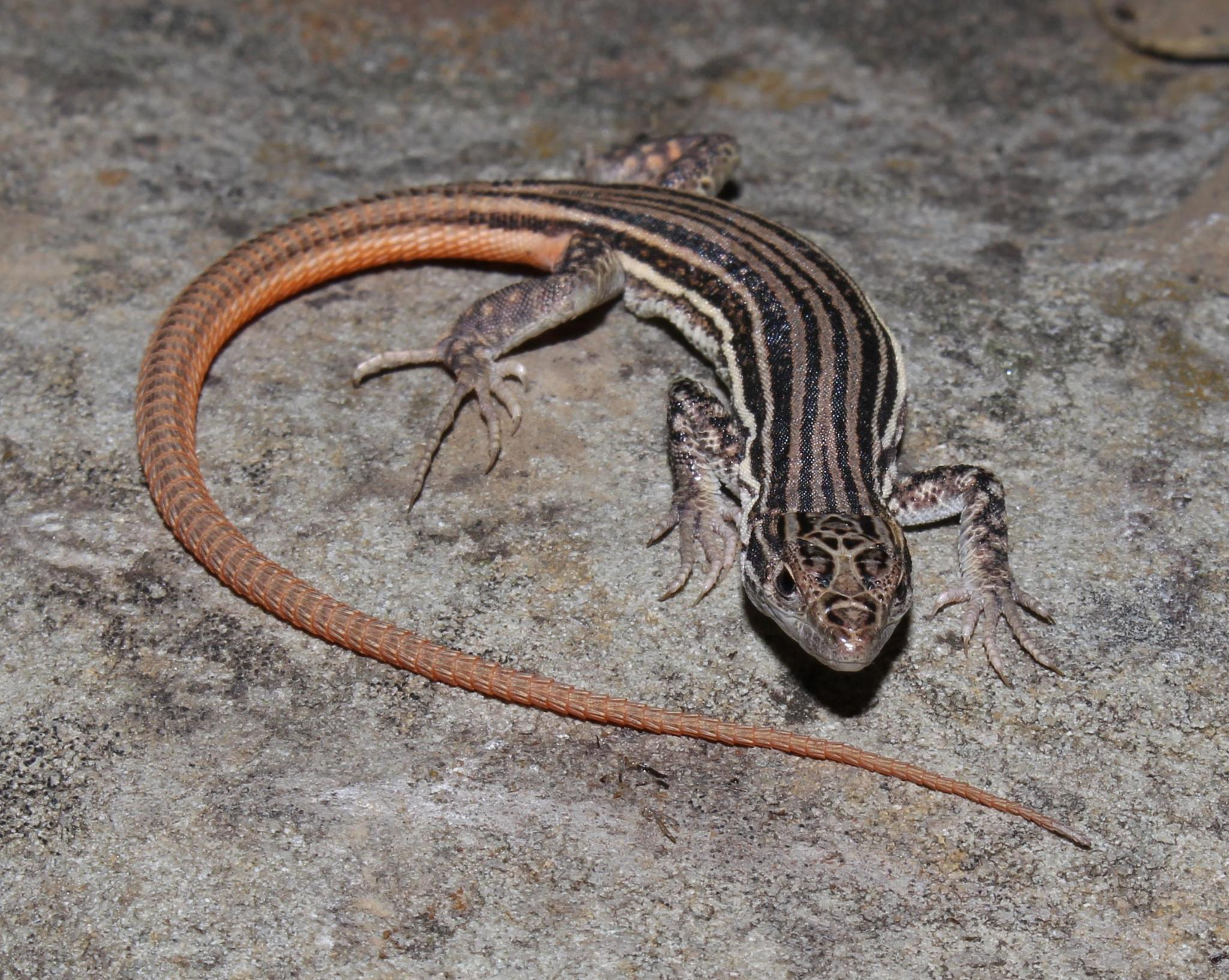

Conservation status
- Least Concern (IUCN 3.1)

Scientific classification
- Kingdom: Animalia
- Phylum: Chordata
- Class: Reptilia
- Order: Squamata
- Family: Lacertidae
- Genus: Pedioplanis
- Species: P. burchelli

Binomial name
- Pedioplanis burchelli (A.M.C. Duméril & Bibron, 1839)

Synonyms
- Eremias burchelli A.M.C. Duméril & Bibron, 1839; Mesalina burchelli Szczerbak, 1975; Pedioplanis burchelli Mayer, 1989

= Pedioplanis burchelli =

Species of lizard

Pedioplanis burchelli, known commonly as Burchell's sand lizard, is a species of lizard in the family Lacertidae. The species is native to Southern Africa.

== Etymology ==
The specific name, burchelli, is in honor of William John Burchell who was an English explorer and naturalist.

== Range ==
P. burchelli is found in Lesotho and the Republic of South Africa.

== Habitat ==
The preferred natural habitats of P. burchelli are savanna, shrubland, and grassland.

== Description ==
Adults of P. burchelli have a snout-to-vent length (SVL) of 4.5–5.5 centimetres (1.8–2.2 in). Coloration is very variable. The lower eyelid is opaque, without any transparent "window" scales. There are no enlarged temporal or tympanic shields.

== Reproduction ==
P. burchelli is oviparous. Clutch size is 4-6 eggs. Each oval egg measures about 9 mm (0.35 in) by 11 mm (0.43 in). Each hatchling has a total length (including tail) of about 7.2 cm (2.8 in).
