= Pedioplanis rubens =

Conservation status
- Least Concern (IUCN 3.1)

Scientific classification
- Kingdom: Animalia
- Phylum: Chordata
- Class: Reptilia
- Order: Squamata
- Family: Lacertidae
- Genus: Pedioplanis
- Species: P. rubens

Binomial name
- Pedioplanis rubens (Mertens, 1954)

Synonyms
- Eremias undata rubens Mertens, 1954; Mesalina undata rubens — Szczerbak, 1989; Pedioplanis undata rubens — Mayer, 1989; Pedioplanis rubens — Makokha et al., 2007

Species of lizard

Pedioplanis rubens, called commonly the Waterberg sand lizard, reddish sand lizard, and (misleadingly) Ruben's sand lizard, is a species of lizard in the family Lacertidae. The species is endemic to Namibia.

== Etymology ==
The specific name, rubens, which means "tinged with red" in Latin, is not in honor of any person named Ruben, but rather refers to the brick red color of the tail.

== Geographic range ==
P. rubens is found atop the northern portion of the Waterberg Plateau in Namibia.

== Habitat ==
The natural habitat of P. rubens is mopane savanna with red sandstone.

== Description ==
P. rubens may attain a snout-to-vent length (SVL) of 5 cm (2.0 in). The tail is long, slightly more than twice SVL. Dorsally, the head and body are brown, and the tail is bright brick red. Ventrally, it is lighter-colored.

== Reproduction ==
P. rubens is oviparous.
