= Tenuidactylus elongatus =

Conservation status
- Least Concern (IUCN 3.1)

Scientific classification
- Kingdom: Animalia
- Phylum: Chordata
- Class: Reptilia
- Order: Squamata
- Suborder: Gekkota
- Family: Gekkonidae
- Genus: Tenuidactylus
- Species: T. elongatus

Binomial name
- Tenuidactylus elongatus (Blanford, 1875)
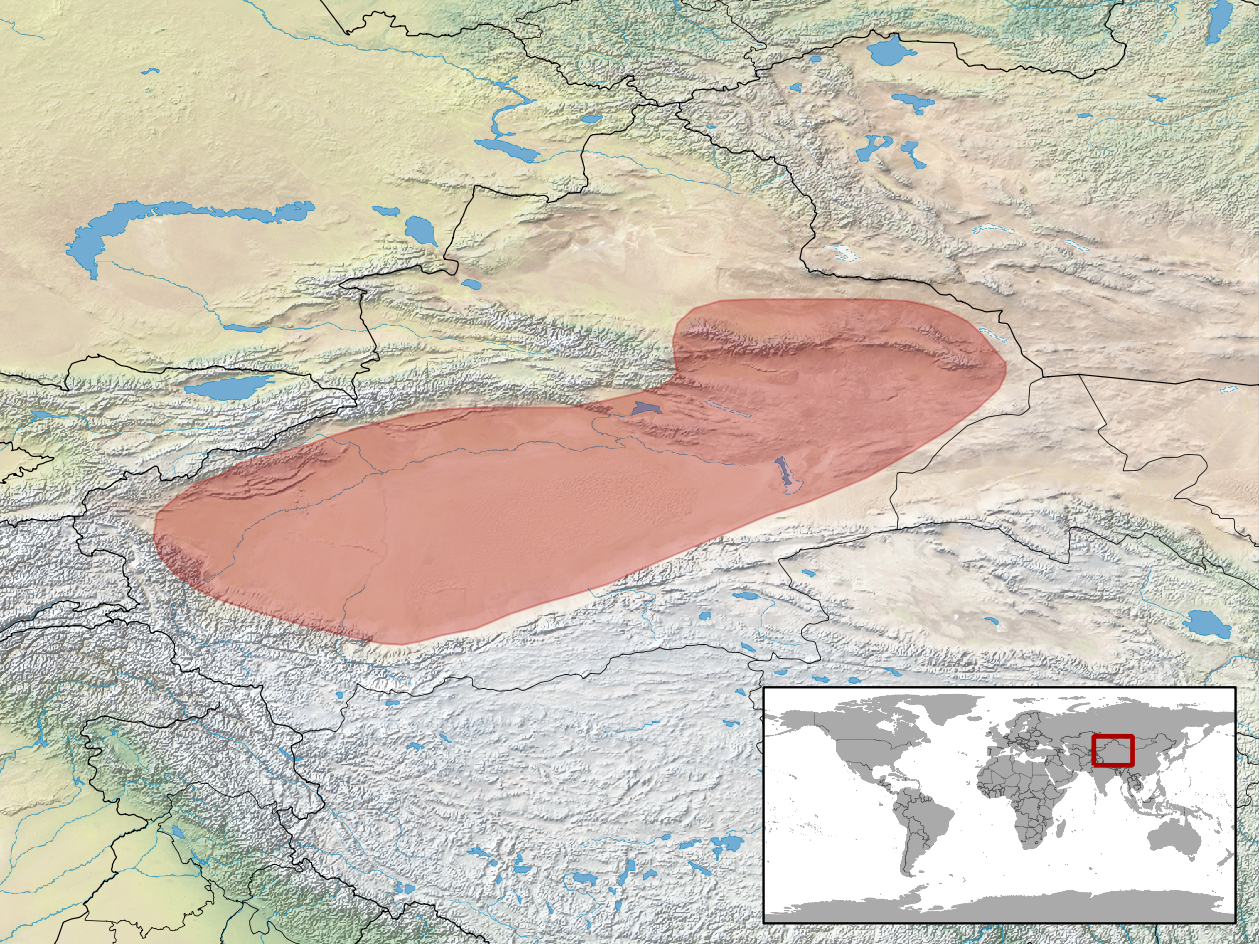

Synonyms
- Gymnodactylus elongatus Blanford 1875; Cyrtodactylus elongatus — Underwood 1954; Tenuidactylus elongatus — Khan & Tasnim 1990; Cyrtopodion elegans — Rösler 1995: 152 (nomen subst.); Cyrtopodion elongatus — Böhme 1985; Cyrtopodion elongatum — Frost 2007

Species of lizard

Tenuidactylus elongatus, also known as the Yangihissar gecko or Kashghar thin-toed gecko, is a lizard species in the genus Tenuidactylus. Its type locality is Yangihissar. It is found in Turkestan, southern Mongolia, and China.
