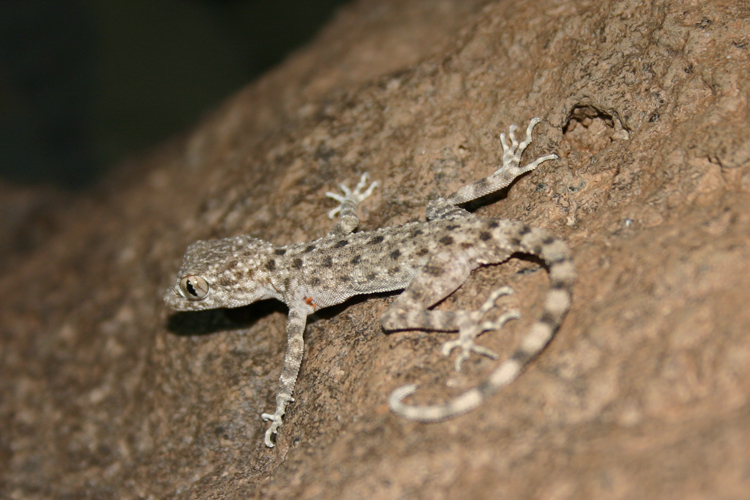

Conservation status
- Least Concern (IUCN 3.1)

Scientific classification
- Kingdom: Animalia
- Phylum: Chordata
- Class: Reptilia
- Order: Squamata
- Suborder: Gekkota
- Family: Gekkonidae
- Genus: Tenuidactylus
- Species: T. longipes

Binomial name
- Tenuidactylus longipes (Nikolsky, 1896)

Synonyms
- Gymnodactylus longipes; Cyrtodactylus longipes; Cyrtopodion longipes; Indogekko longipes

= Tenuidactylus longipes =

Species of lizard

Tenuidactylus longipes, also known as Nikolsky's long-toed gecko or the long-legged thin-toed gecko, is a species of gecko that is found in Iran and southern Turkmenistan. The subspecies microlepis is sometimes considered a distinct species.
