= Eremias andersoni =

Conservation status
- Least Concern (IUCN 3.1)

Scientific classification
- Kingdom: Animalia
- Phylum: Chordata
- Class: Reptilia
- Order: Squamata
- Family: Lacertidae
- Genus: Eremias
- Species: E. andersoni

Binomial name
- Eremias andersoni Darevsky & Szczerbak, 1978

Species of lizard

Eremias andersoni, also known commonly as Anderson's racerunner, is a species of lizard in the family Lacertidae. The species is endemic to Iran.

== Etymology ==
The specific name, andersoni, is in honor of American herpetologist Steven Clement Anderson (born 1936).

== Geographic range ==
E. andersoni is found in northern Iran, in Kavir National Park.

== Habitat ==
The preferred natural habitat of E. andersoni is desert.

== Reproduction ==
E. andersoni is oviparous.
