= Xinjiang even-fingered gecko =

Conservation status
- Least Concern (IUCN 3.1)

Scientific classification
- Kingdom: Animalia
- Phylum: Chordata
- Class: Reptilia
- Order: Squamata
- Suborder: Gekkota
- Family: Gekkonidae
- Genus: Alsophylax
- Species: A. przewalskii

Binomial name
- Alsophylax przewalskii Strauch, 1887
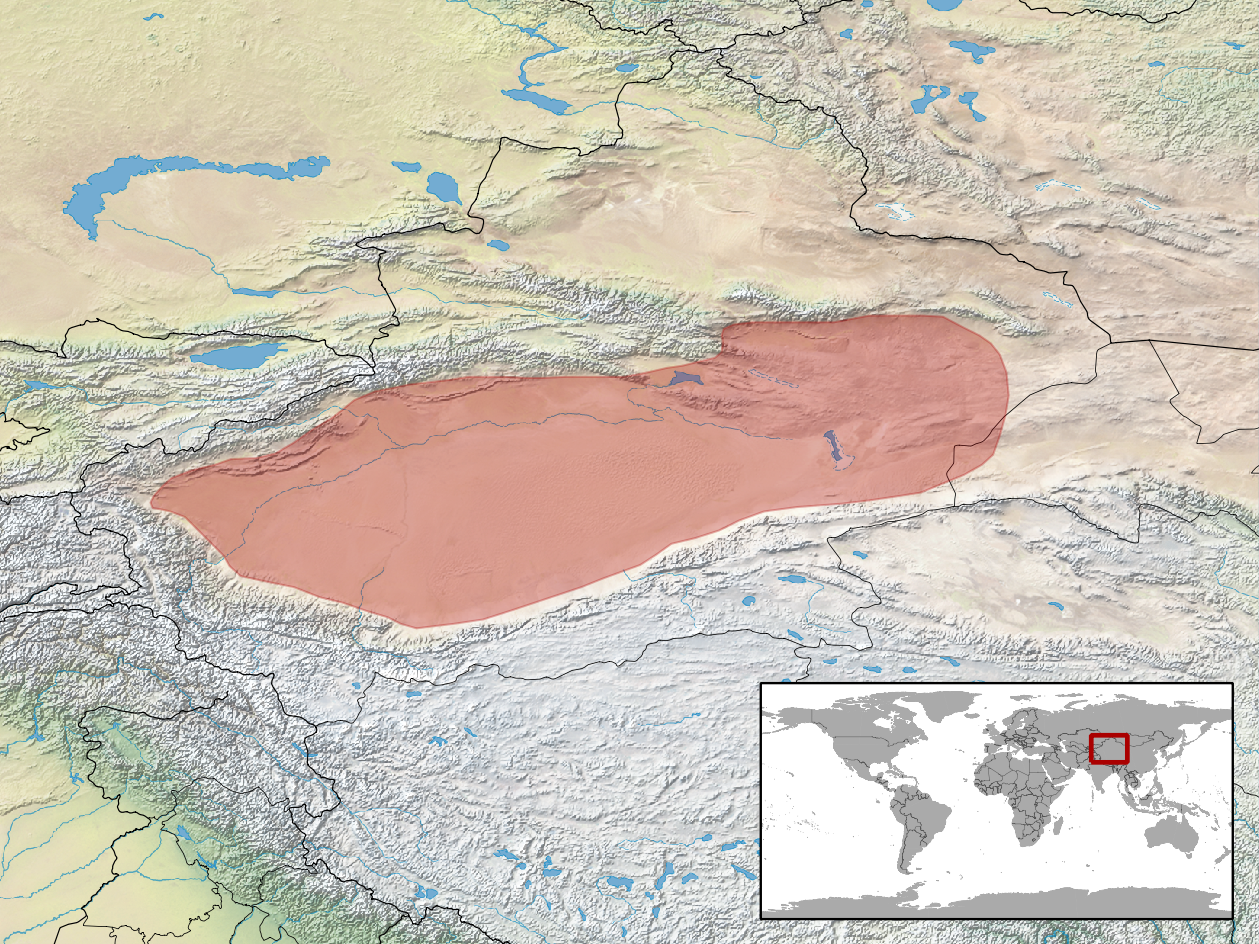

Species of lizard

The Xinjiang even-fingered gecko or Przewalski's pygmy gecko (Alsophylax przewalskii) is a species of lizard in the family Gekkonidae. The species is endemic to Asia.

== Etymology ==
The specific name, przewalskii, is in honor of Russian explorer and naturalist Nikolai Mikhailovitch Prjevalsky.

== Geographic range ==
According to IUCN, A. przewalskii is endemic to western China (Xinjiang and Gansu provinces).The Reptile Database also mentions western Turkestan, overlapping with multiple modern-day jurisdictions.

== Habitat ==
The preferred habitat of A. przewalskii is desert at altitudes of 500–1,400 m (1,600–4,600 ft).

== Reproduction ==
A. przewalskii is oviparous.
