= Pedioplanis serodioi =

Scientific classification
- Kingdom: Animalia
- Phylum: Chordata
- Class: Reptilia
- Order: Squamata
- Family: Lacertidae
- Genus: Pedioplanis
- Species: P. serodioi

Binomial name
- Pedioplanis serodioi Parrinha, Marques, Heinicke, Khalid, Parker, Tolley, Childers, Conradie, Bauer, & Ceriaco, 2021

Species of lizard

Pedioplanis serodioi is a species of lizard in the family Lacertidae. The species is, as currently known, endemic to southwestern Angola, but there is an unconfirmed record from northern Namibia.
