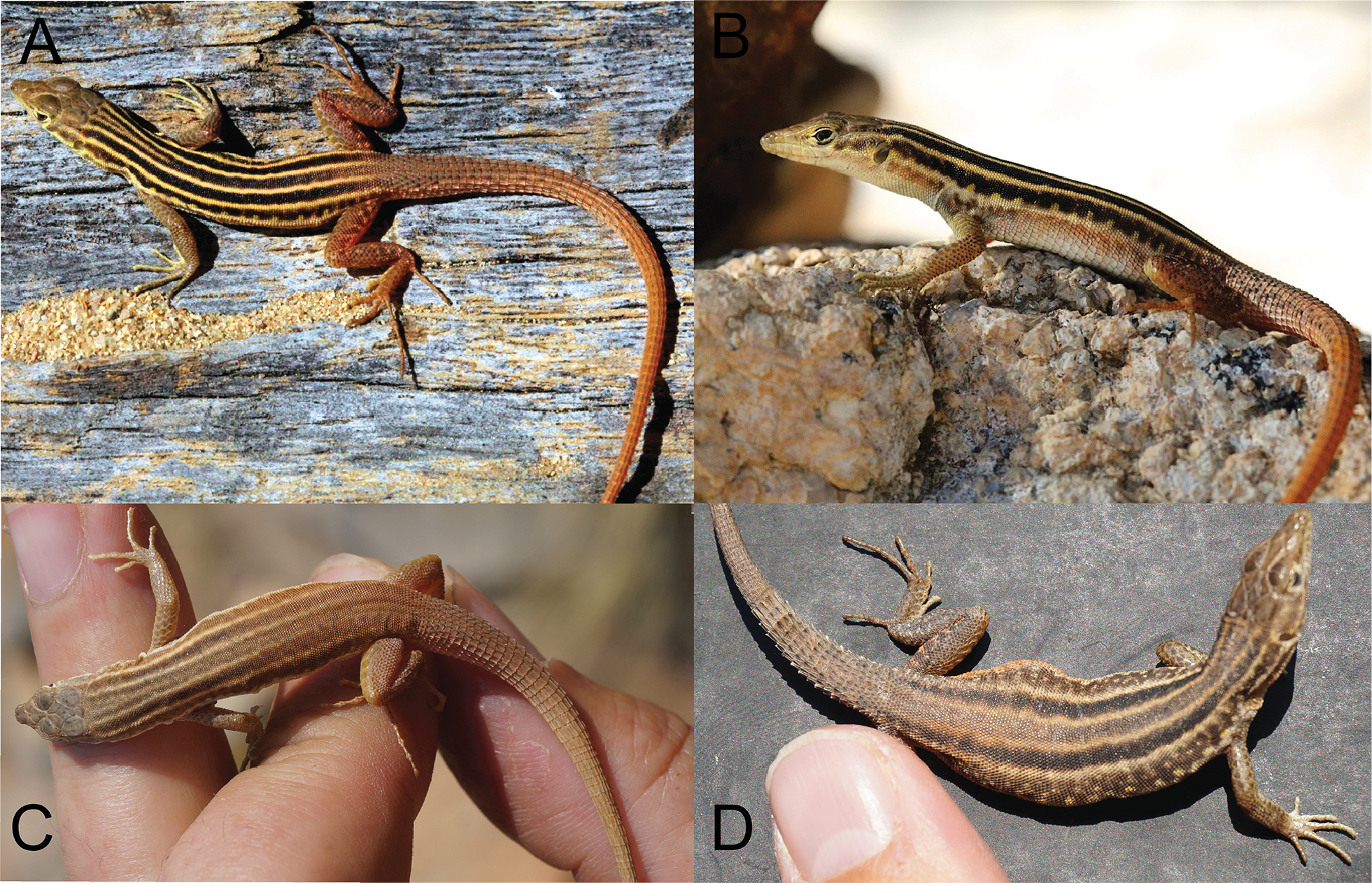

Scientific classification
- Kingdom: Animalia
- Phylum: Chordata
- Class: Reptilia
- Order: Squamata
- Family: Lacertidae
- Genus: Pedioplanis
- Species: P. mayeri

Binomial name
- Pedioplanis mayeri Childers, Kirchhof, & Bauer, 2021

= Pedioplanis mayeri =

Species of lizard

Pedioplanis mayeri is a species of lizard in the family Lacertidae. The species is endemic to Namibia. It is named after the Austrian lacertid specialist Werner Mayer.

Pedioplanis mayeri measure 41–53 mm (1.6–2.1 in) in snout–vent length.
