= Pedioplanis inornata =

Conservation status
- Least Concern (IUCN 3.1)

Scientific classification
- Kingdom: Animalia
- Phylum: Chordata
- Class: Reptilia
- Order: Squamata
- Family: Lacertidae
- Genus: Pedioplanis
- Species: P. inornata

Binomial name
- Pedioplanis inornata (Roux, 1907)

Synonyms
- Eremias inornata Roux, 1907; Eremias undata inornata — Daan & Hillenius, 1966; Pedioplanis undata inornata — Mayer, 1989; Pedioplanis inornata — Bauer & Branch, 2003

Species of lizard

Pedioplanis inornata, known commonly as the plain sand lizard or the western sand lizard, is a species of lizard in the family Lacertidae. The species is endemic to Southern Africa.

== Geographic range ==
P. inornata is found in Namibia and South Africa.

== Description ==
Adults of P. inornata have a snout-to-vent length (SVL) of 4.5–5.0 cm (1.8–2.0 in), with a tail slightly more than twice SVL. The "window" in the lower eyelid is composed of 2–4 large semitransparent scales. Dorsally, P. inornata is uniformly grayish brown, and it has pale greenish spots on the flanks.

== Reproduction ==
P. inornata is oviparous.
