= Pedioplanis huntleyi =

Conservation status
- Least Concern (IUCN 3.1)

Scientific classification
- Kingdom: Animalia
- Phylum: Chordata
- Class: Reptilia
- Order: Squamata
- Family: Lacertidae
- Genus: Pedioplanis
- Species: P. huntleyi

Binomial name
- Pedioplanis huntleyi Conradie, Measey, Branch & Tolley, 2012

Species of lizard

Pedioplanis huntleyi is a species of lizard in the family Lacertidae. The species is endemic to Angola.

== Etymology ==
The specific name, huntleyi, is in honor of Brian Huntley who was chief executive officer of the South African National Biodiversity Institute.

== Geographic range ==
P. huntleyi is found in southwestern Angola in Cunene and Namibe Provinces.

== Habitat ==
The natural habitats of P. huntleyi are rocky areas, shrubland, and woodland.
