= Chabahar dwarf gecko =

Scientific classification
- Domain: Eukaryota
- Kingdom: Animalia
- Phylum: Chordata
- Class: Reptilia
- Order: Squamata
- Infraorder: Gekkota
- Family: Gekkonidae
- Genus: Microgecko
- Species: M. chabaharensis

Binomial name
- Microgecko chabaharensis Gholamifard, Rastegar-Pouyani, Rastegar-Pouyani, Khosravani, Yousefkhani, & Oraei, 2015

Species of lizard

The Chabahar dwarf gecko (Microgecko chabaharensis) is a species of lizard in the family Gekkonidae. It is endemic to southeastern Iran.
