= Pedioplanis husabensis =

Conservation status
- Least Concern (IUCN 3.1)

Scientific classification
- Kingdom: Animalia
- Phylum: Chordata
- Class: Reptilia
- Order: Squamata
- Family: Lacertidae
- Genus: Pedioplanis
- Species: P. husabensis

Binomial name
- Pedioplanis husabensis Berger-Dell'mour & Mayer, 1989

Species of lizard

Pedioplanis husabensis, also called Husab lizard, is a species of lizard in the family Lacertidae. The species is endemic to Namibia.

== Geographic range ==
Pedioplanis husabensis inhabits a small area in the central portion of the Namib desert in Namibia. The steep bluffs on both sides of the Khan River and Swakop River are occupied by P. husabensis while higher up, the flatter knolls and hillocks are home to Pedioplanis inornata.

== Reproduction ==
Pedioplanis husabensis is oviparous.
