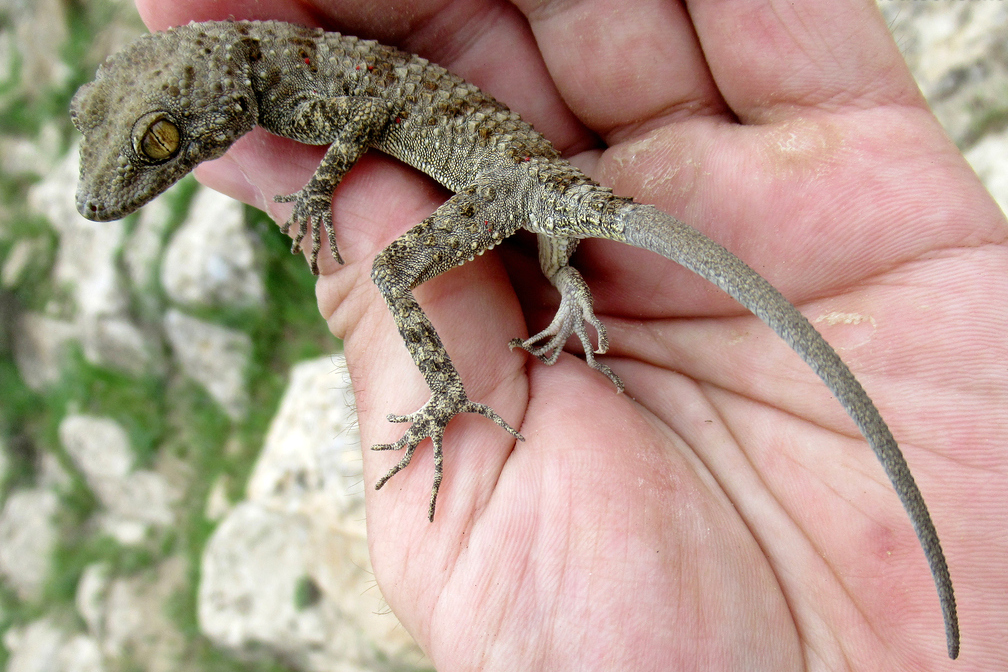
- Tenuidactylus fedtschenkoi

Conservation status
- Least Concern (IUCN 3.1)

Scientific classification
- Kingdom: Animalia
- Phylum: Chordata
- Class: Reptilia
- Order: Squamata
- Suborder: Gekkota
- Family: Gekkonidae
- Genus: Tenuidactylus
- Species: T. fedtschenkoi

Binomial name
- Tenuidactylus fedtschenkoi (Strauch, 1887)

Synonyms
- Gymnodactylus fedtschenkoi Strauch, 1887; Cyrtodactylus feldschenkoi [sic] — Underwood, 1954 (in error); Cyrtopodion fedtschenkoi — Böhme, 1985; Tenuidactylus fedtschenkoi — M. Khan & Tasnim, 1990

= Turkestan thin-toed gecko =

Species of lizard

The Turkestan thin-toed gecko (Tenuidactylus fedtschenkoi), also known commonly as Fedtschenko's bow-fingered gecko and Fedtschenko's grasping gecko, is a species of lizard in the family Gekkonidae. The species is native to Central Asia.

== Etymology ==
The specific name, fedtschenkoi, is in honor of Russian naturalist Alexei Pavlovich Fedtschenko.

== Geographic range ==
T. fedtschenkoi is found in southeastern Turkmenistan, southern Uzbekistan, and western Tajikistan.

== Habitat ==
The preferred natural habitat of T. fedtschenkoi is vertical surfaces in rocky areas, at altitudes up to 2,300 m (7,500 ft). It has also been found on walls of houses and ruins.

== Reproduction ==
T. fedtschenkoi is oviparous. Clutch size is two eggs.
