= Southwest thin-toed gecko =

Conservation status
- Least Concern (IUCN 3.1)

Scientific classification
- Kingdom: Animalia
- Phylum: Chordata
- Class: Reptilia
- Order: Squamata
- Suborder: Gekkota
- Family: Gekkonidae
- Genus: Tenuidactylus
- Species: T. voraginosus

Binomial name
- Tenuidactylus voraginosus (Leviton & Anderson, 1984)

Synonyms
- Cyrtodactylus voraginosus; Tenuidactylus longipes voraginosus; Cyrtopodion voraginosum; Indogekko longipes voraginosus

Species of lizard

The southwest thin-toed gecko (Tenuidactylus voraginosus) is a species of gecko that is endemic to Afghanistan.
