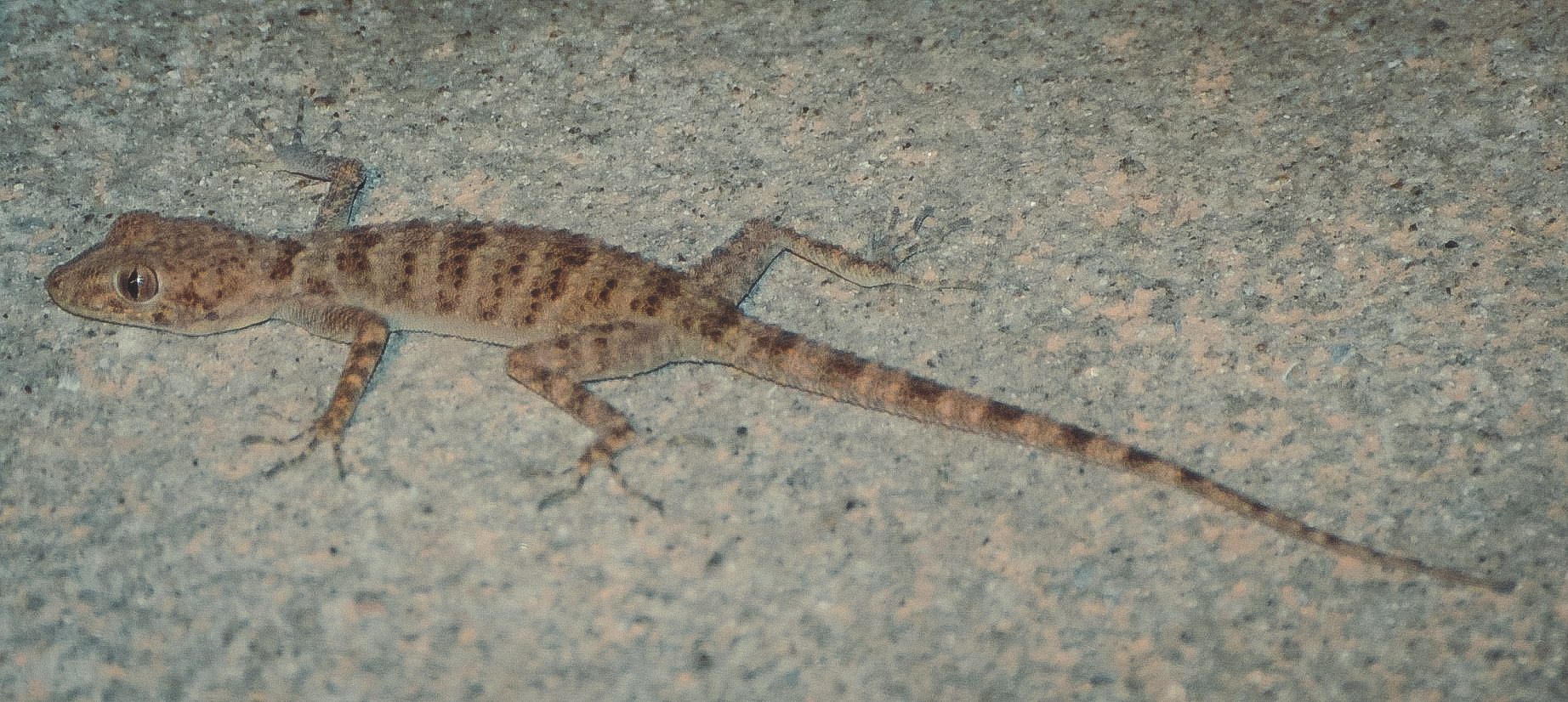

Conservation status
- Least Concern (IUCN 3.1)

Scientific classification
- Kingdom: Animalia
- Phylum: Chordata
- Class: Reptilia
- Order: Squamata
- Suborder: Gekkota
- Family: Gekkonidae
- Genus: Tenuidactylus
- Species: T. bogdanovi

Binomial name
- Tenuidactylus bogdanovi Nazarov & Poyarkov, 2013

= Tenuidactylus bogdanovi =

Species of lizard

Tenuidactylus bogdanovi is a species of gecko, a lizard in the family Gekkonidae. The species is native to Central Asia.

== Etymology ==
The specific name, bogdanovi, is in honor of Soviet herpetologist Oleg Pavlovich Bogdanov.

== Geographic range ==
T. bogdanovi occurs naturally in Uzbekistan and southern Tajikistan. An introduced population of this species is known in South Ukraine, in the city of Odesa.

== Habitat ==
The preferred natural habitat of T. bogdanovi is desert, at altitudes up to 700 m (2,300 ft). It has also been found inside buildings.

== Reproduction ==
T. bogdanovi is oviparous. Clutch size is one or two eggs.
