= Pedioplanis haackei =

Conservation status
- Least Concern (IUCN 3.1)

Scientific classification
- Kingdom: Animalia
- Phylum: Chordata
- Class: Reptilia
- Order: Squamata
- Family: Lacertidae
- Genus: Pedioplanis
- Species: P. haackei

Binomial name
- Pedioplanis haackei Conradie, Measey, Branch & Tolley, 2012

Species of lizard

Pedioplanis haackei is a species of lizard in the family Lacertidae. The species is endemic to Angola.

== Etymology ==
The specific name, haackei, is in honor of South African herpetologist Wulf Dietrich Haacke (1936–2021).

== Geographic range ==
P. haackei is found in Namibe Province in southwestern Angola.

== Habitat ==
The natural habitat of P. haackei is sandy plains near rock outcrops with some grass and Senegalia mellifera thorn bushes.

== Description ==
P. haackei has 10 longitudinal rows of ventral scales. It typically has three faint dorso-lateral stripes, which are dark-colored and bordered with white. The flanks have a reticulated pattern. The semitransparent "window" of the lower eyelid consists of two large scales.
