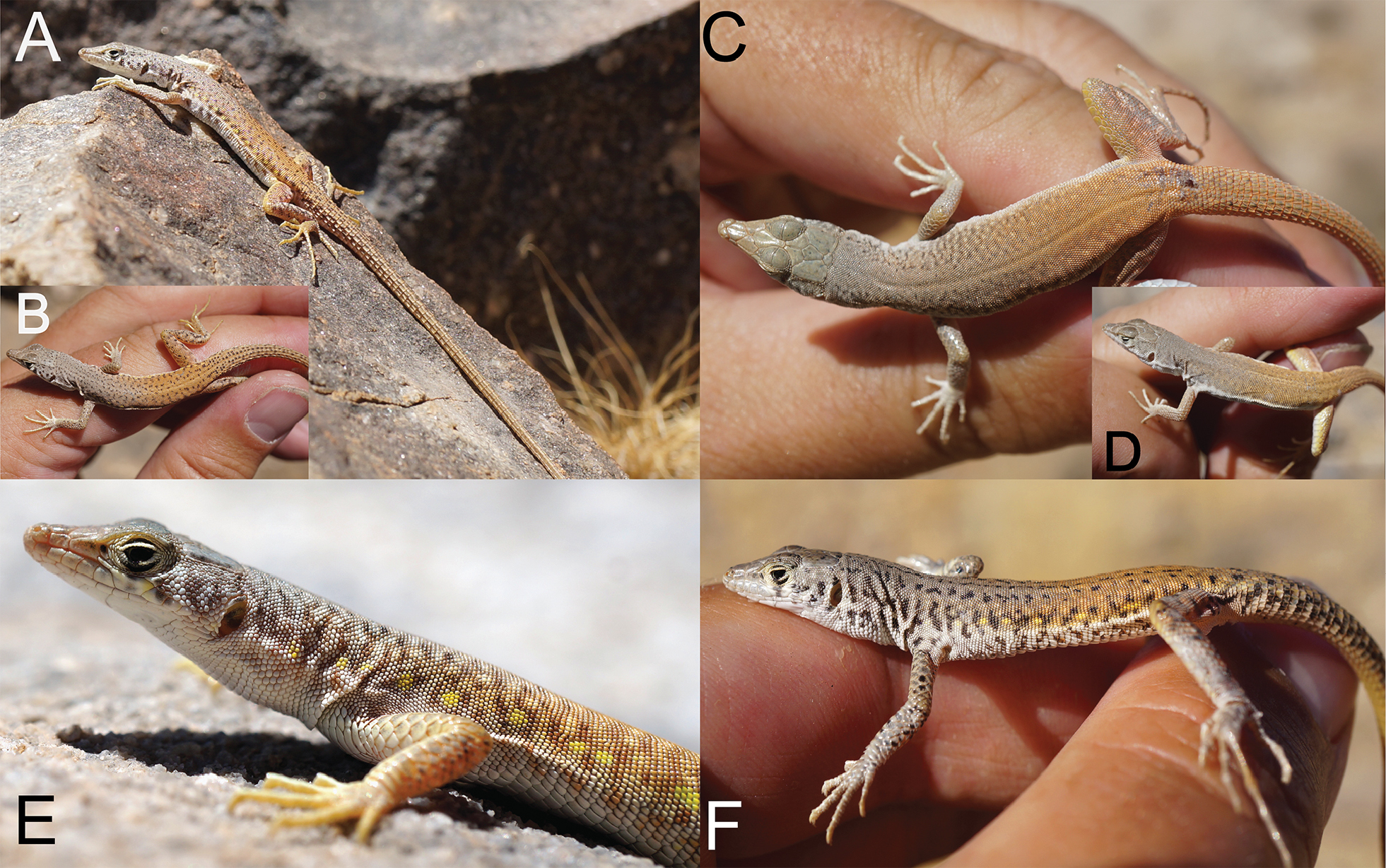

Scientific classification
- Kingdom: Animalia
- Phylum: Chordata
- Class: Reptilia
- Order: Squamata
- Family: Lacertidae
- Genus: Pedioplanis
- Species: P. branchi

Binomial name
- Pedioplanis branchi Childers, Kirchhof, & Bauer, 2021

= Pedioplanis branchi =

Species of lizard

Pedioplanis branchi is a species of lizard in the family Lacertidae. The species is endemic to Namibia. It is named after the British-born South African herpetologist William Roy Branch.

Pedioplanis branchi measure 42–50 mm (1.7–2.0 in) in snout–vent length.
