= Microgecko tanishpaensis =

Scientific classification
- Domain: Eukaryota
- Kingdom: Animalia
- Phylum: Chordata
- Class: Reptilia
- Order: Squamata
- Infraorder: Gekkota
- Family: Gekkonidae
- Genus: Microgecko
- Species: M. tanishpaensis

Binomial name
- Microgecko tanishpaensis Masroor, Khisroon, Khan, & Jablonski, 2020

Species of lizard

Tanishpa’s dwarf gecko (Microgecko tanishpaensis) is a species of lizard in the family Gekkonidae. It is endemic to Pakistan.
