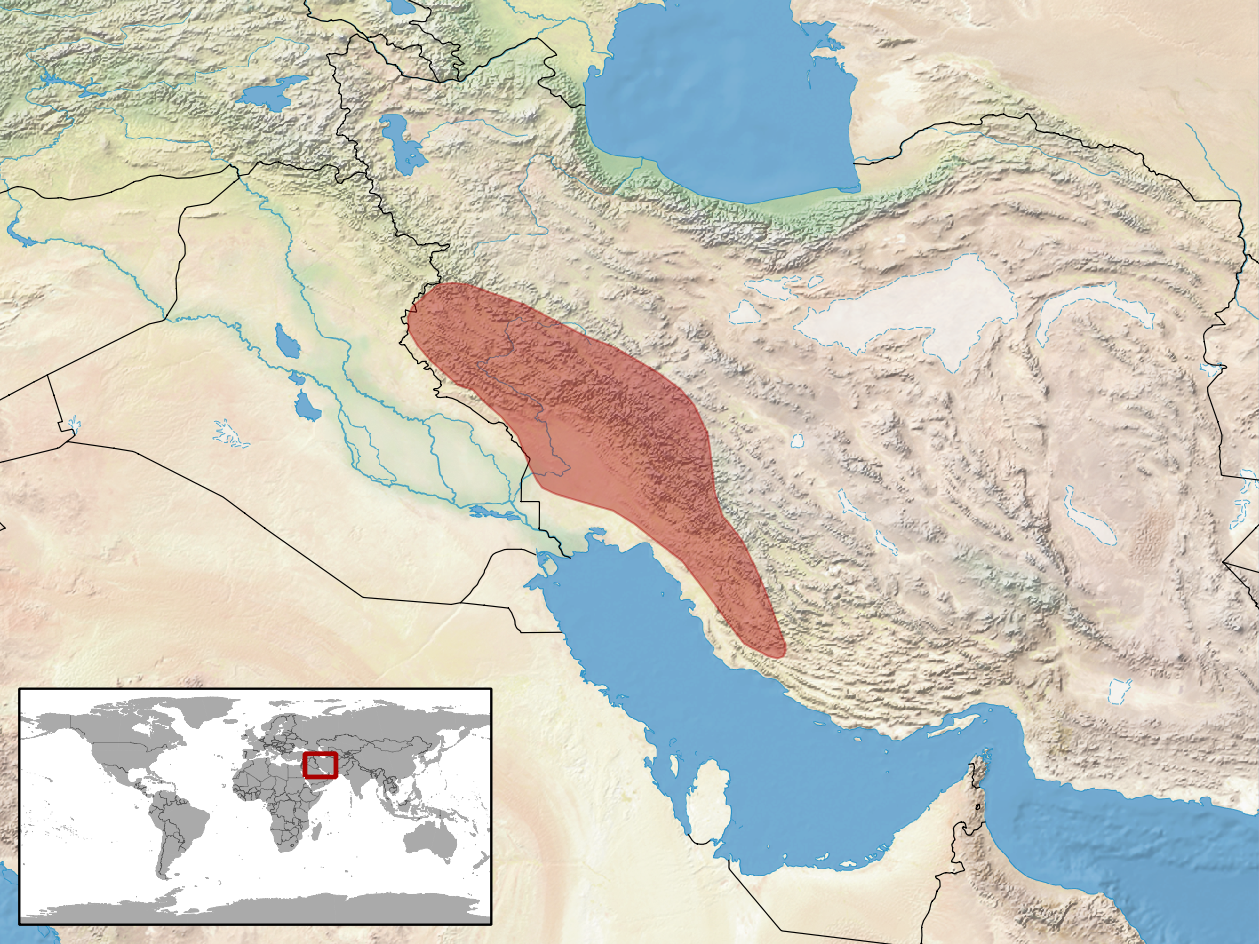
- Geographic distribution

Conservation status
- Data Deficient (IUCN 3.1)

Scientific classification
- Kingdom: Animalia
- Phylum: Chordata
- Class: Reptilia
- Order: Squamata
- Suborder: Gekkota
- Family: Gekkonidae
- Genus: Microgecko
- Species: M. helenae

Binomial name
- Microgecko helenae Nikolsky, 1907

Synonyms
- Microgecko helenae Nikolsky, 1907; Tropiocolotes helenae — Mertens, 1956; Microgecko helenae — S. Anderson, 1961; Tropiocolotes (Microgecko) helenae — Rösler, 2000; Microgecko helenae — Bauer et al., 2013

= Microgecko helenae =

Species of lizard

Microgecko helenae, also known commonly as the banded dwarf gecko, Helen's banded dwarf gecko, Helen's tiny gecko, the Khuristan dwarf gecko, and the Khuzestan dwarf gecko, is a species of lizard in the family Gekkonidae. The species is endemic to Iran. There are two recognized subspecies.

== Etymology ==
The specific name, helenae, is in honor of Helena Nikolsky.

== Geographic range ==
M. helenae is found in western Iran.

== Habitat ==
The preferred natural habitats of M. helenae are forest, shrubland, and grassland, at altitudes up to 1,500 m (4,900 ft).

== Description ==
Adults of M. helenae have a snout-to-vent length (SVL) of 15.0–26.2 mm (0.59–1.03 in).

== Reproduction ==
M. helenae is oviparous.

== Subspecies ==
Two subspecies are recognized as being valid, including the nominotypical subspecies.

- Microgecko helenae fasciatus (J.J. Schmidtler & J.F. Schmidtler, 1972)
- Microgecko helenae helenae Nikolsky, 1907

Nota bene: A trinomial authority in parentheses indicates that the subspecies was originally described in a genus other than Microgecko.
