= Tenuidactylus dadunensis =

Scientific classification
- Kingdom: Animalia
- Phylum: Chordata
- Class: Reptilia
- Order: Squamata
- Suborder: Gekkota
- Family: Gekkonidae
- Genus: Tenuidactylus
- Species: T. dadunensis

Binomial name
- Tenuidactylus dadunensis (Shi & Zhao, 2011)

Synonyms
- Cyrtopodion dadunense

Species of lizard

Tenuidactylus dadunensis is a species of gecko that is endemic to China.
