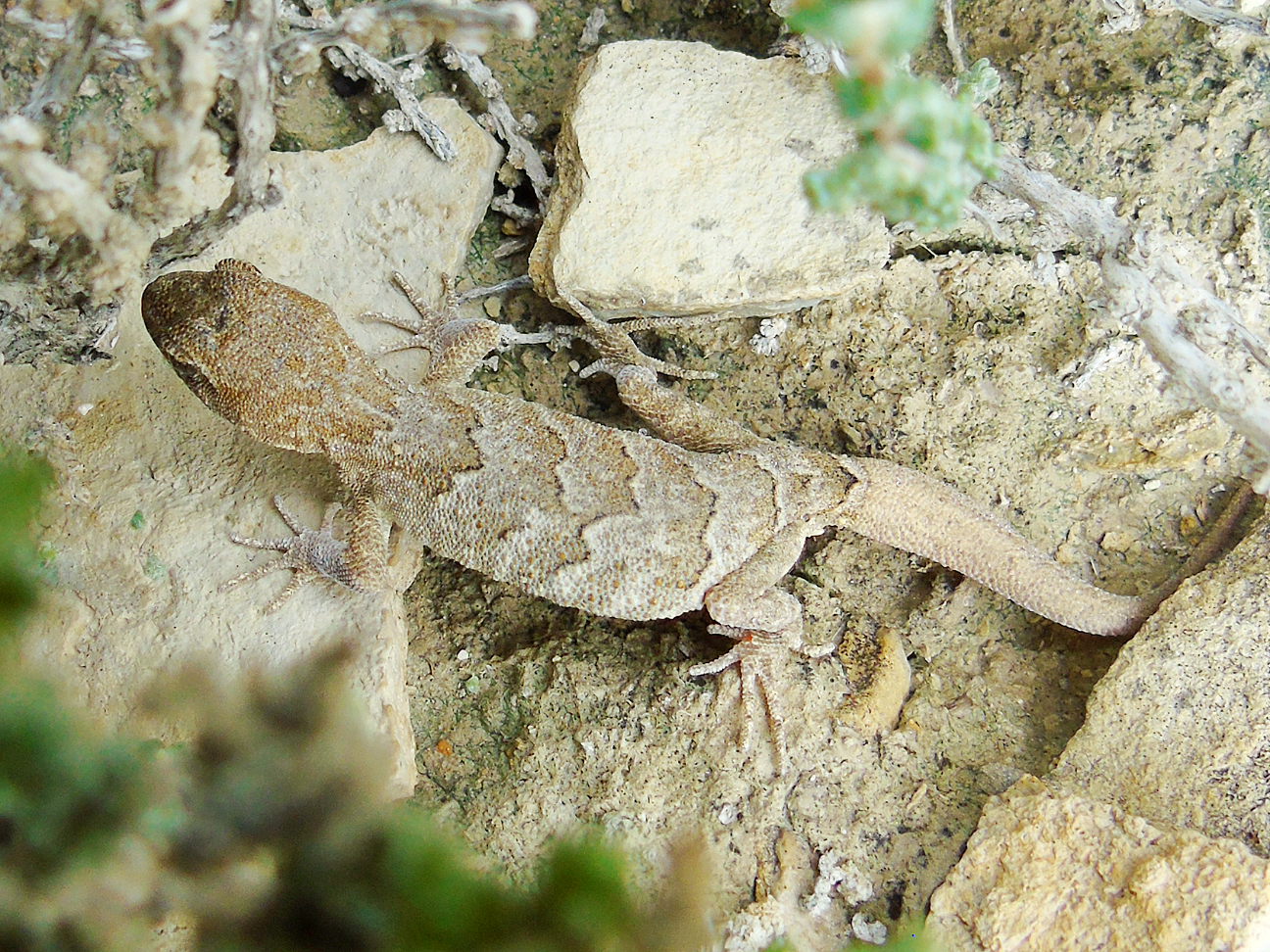

Conservation status
- Least Concern (IUCN 3.1)

Scientific classification
- Kingdom: Animalia
- Phylum: Chordata
- Class: Reptilia
- Order: Squamata
- Suborder: Gekkota
- Family: Gekkonidae
- Genus: Altiphylax
- Species: A. tokobajevi

Binomial name
- Altiphylax tokobajevi (Jeremčenko & Szczerbak, 1984)
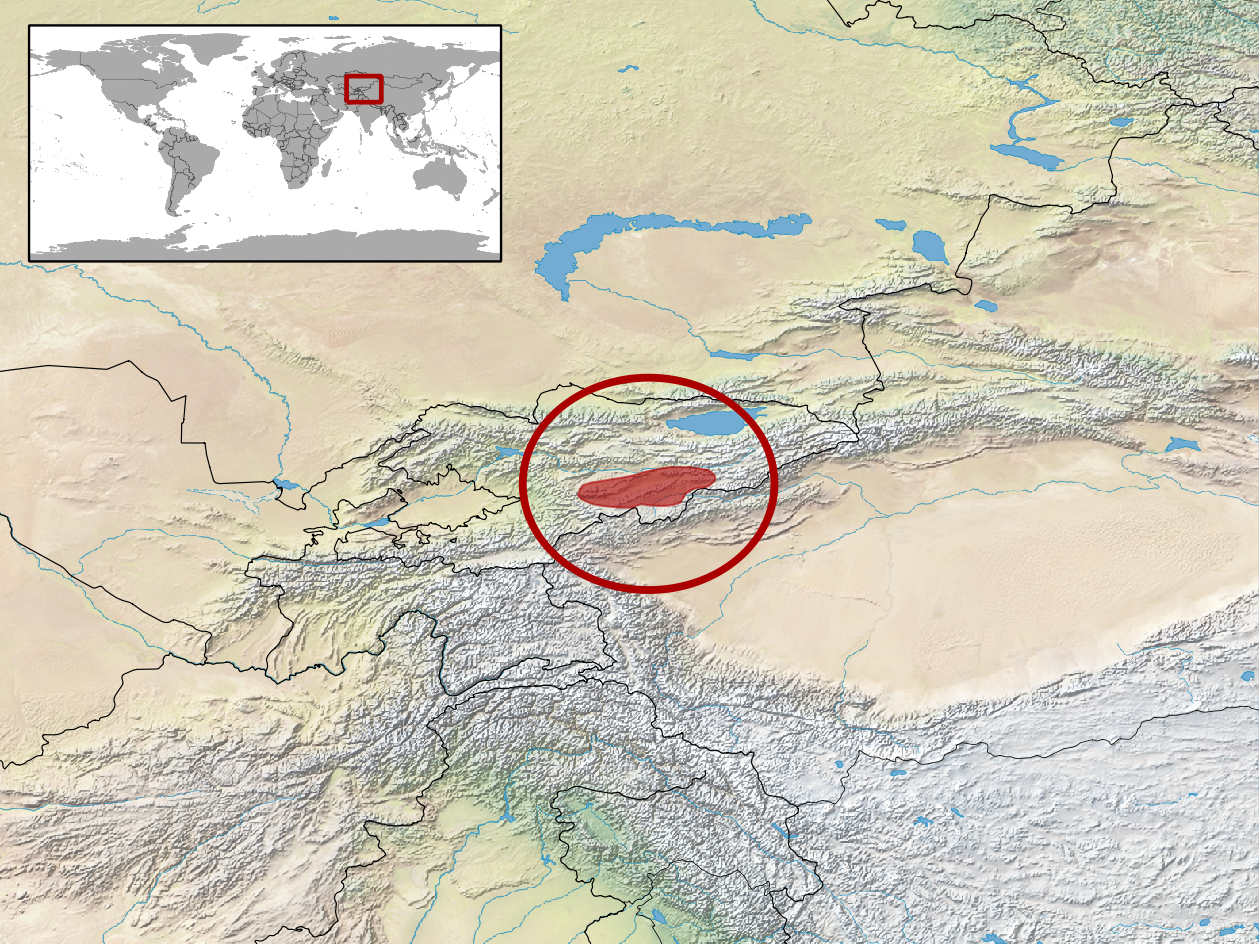

Synonyms
- Alsophylax tokobajevi Jeremčenko & Szczerbak, 1984; Alsophylax (Altiphylax) tokobajevi — Rösler, 2000

= Altiphylax tokobajevi =

Species of lizard

Altiphylax tokobajevi, also known commonly as the Kirghizia even-fingered gecko, the Tien Shan even-fingered gecko, and the Tjan-Shan pygmy gecko, is a species of lizard in the family Gekkonidae. The species is native to Asia.

== Etymology ==
The specific name, tokobajevi, is in honor of Marat M. Tokobaev (born 1932), who is an entomologist and parasitologist.

== Geographic range ==
A. tokobajevi is found in Kyrgyzstan.

== Habitat ==
The preferred natural habitat of A. tokobajevi is shrubland, at altitudes of 1,800–2,500 m (5,900–8,200 ft).

== Reproduction ==
A. tokobajevi is oviparous.
