= Cyrtodactylus paradoxus =

Scientific classification
- Kingdom: Animalia
- Phylum: Chordata
- Class: Reptilia
- Order: Squamata
- Suborder: Gekkota
- Family: Gekkonidae
- Genus: Cyrtodactylus
- Species: C. paradoxus

Binomial name
- Cyrtodactylus paradoxus (Darevsky & Szczerbak, 1997)

Synonyms
- Gonydactylus paradoxus

Species of lizard

Cyrtodactylus paradoxus is a species of gecko that is endemic to some islands in southern Vietnam.
