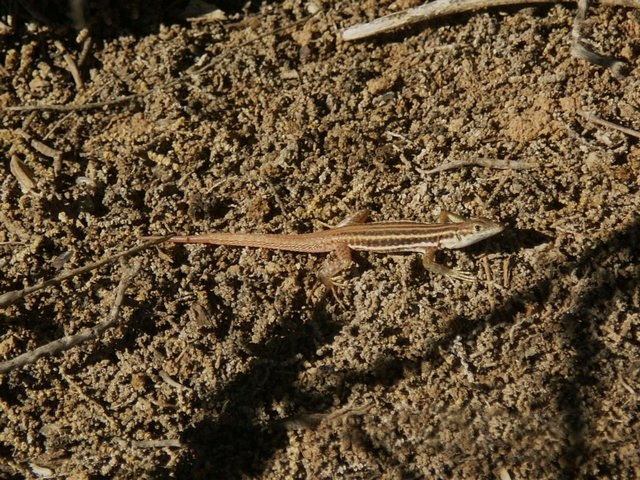

Conservation status
- Least Concern (IUCN 3.1)

Scientific classification
- Kingdom: Animalia
- Phylum: Chordata
- Class: Reptilia
- Order: Squamata
- Family: Lacertidae
- Genus: Pedioplanis
- Species: P. namaquensis

Binomial name
- Pedioplanis namaquensis (A.M.C. Duméril & Bibron, 1839)

Synonyms
- Eremias namaquensis A.M.C. Duméril & Bibron, 1839; Mesalina namaquensis — Szczerbak, 1989; Pedioplanis namaquensis — Mayer, 1989

= Pedioplanis namaquensis =

Species of lizard

Pedioplanis namaquensis, known commonly as the Namaqua sand lizard or l'Érémias namaquois (in French), is a species of lizard in the family Lacertidae. The species is endemic to Southern Africa.

== Geographic range ==
P. namaquensis is found in Botswana, Namibia, and South Africa.

== Description ==
A slender and small species, adults have a snout-to-vent length (SVL) of 4–5 cm (1.6–2.0 in). The lower eyelid has 10–12 enlarged scales, and is semitransparent.

== Diet ==
P. namaquensis preys upon insects.

== Reproduction ==
P. namaquensis is oviparous.
