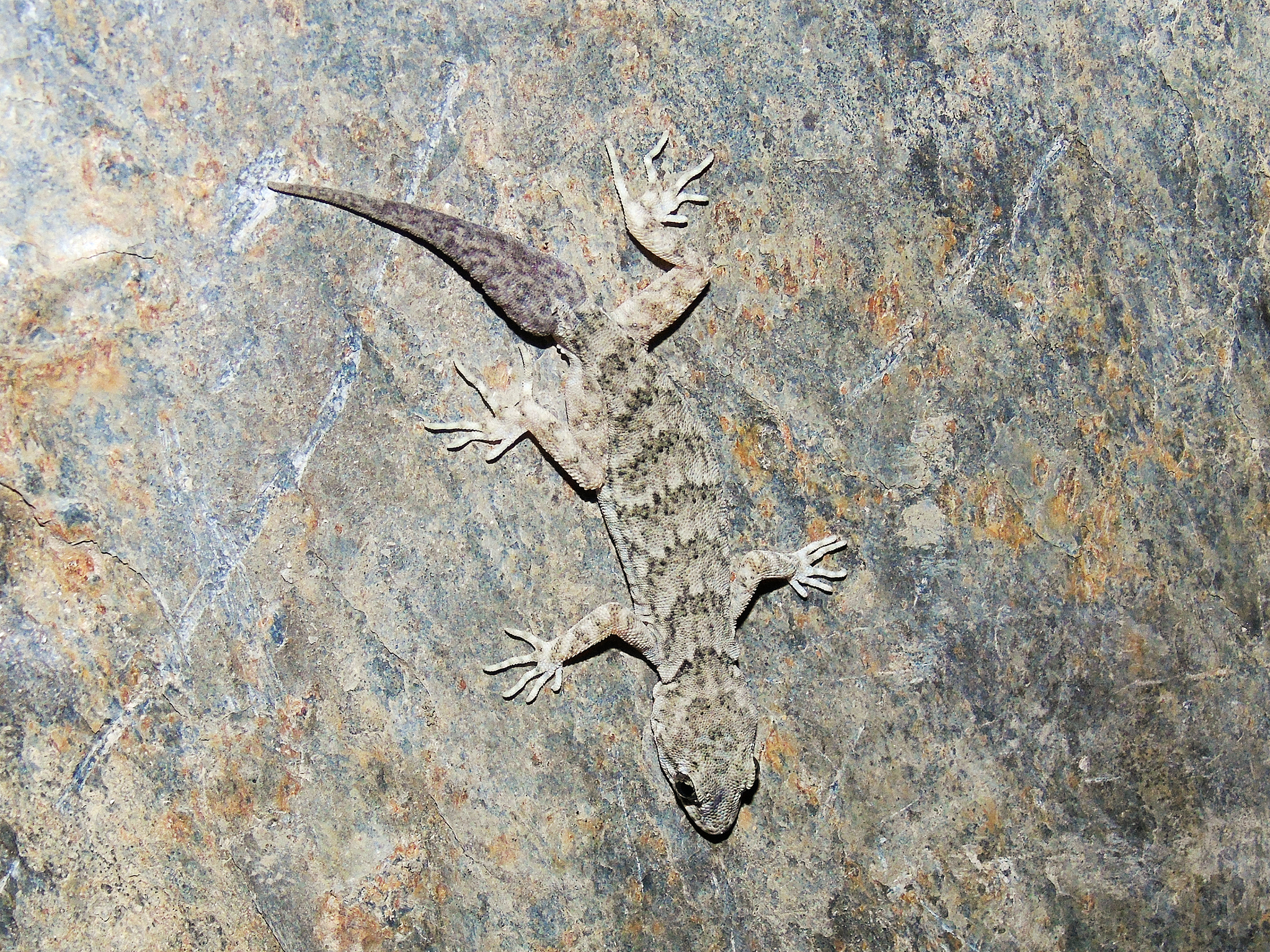
- From Pakistan.

Conservation status
- Least Concern (IUCN 3.1)

Scientific classification
- Kingdom: Animalia
- Phylum: Chordata
- Class: Reptilia
- Order: Squamata
- Suborder: Gekkota
- Family: Gekkonidae
- Genus: Altiphylax
- Species: A. stoliczkai

Binomial name
- Altiphylax stoliczkai (Steindachner, 1867)
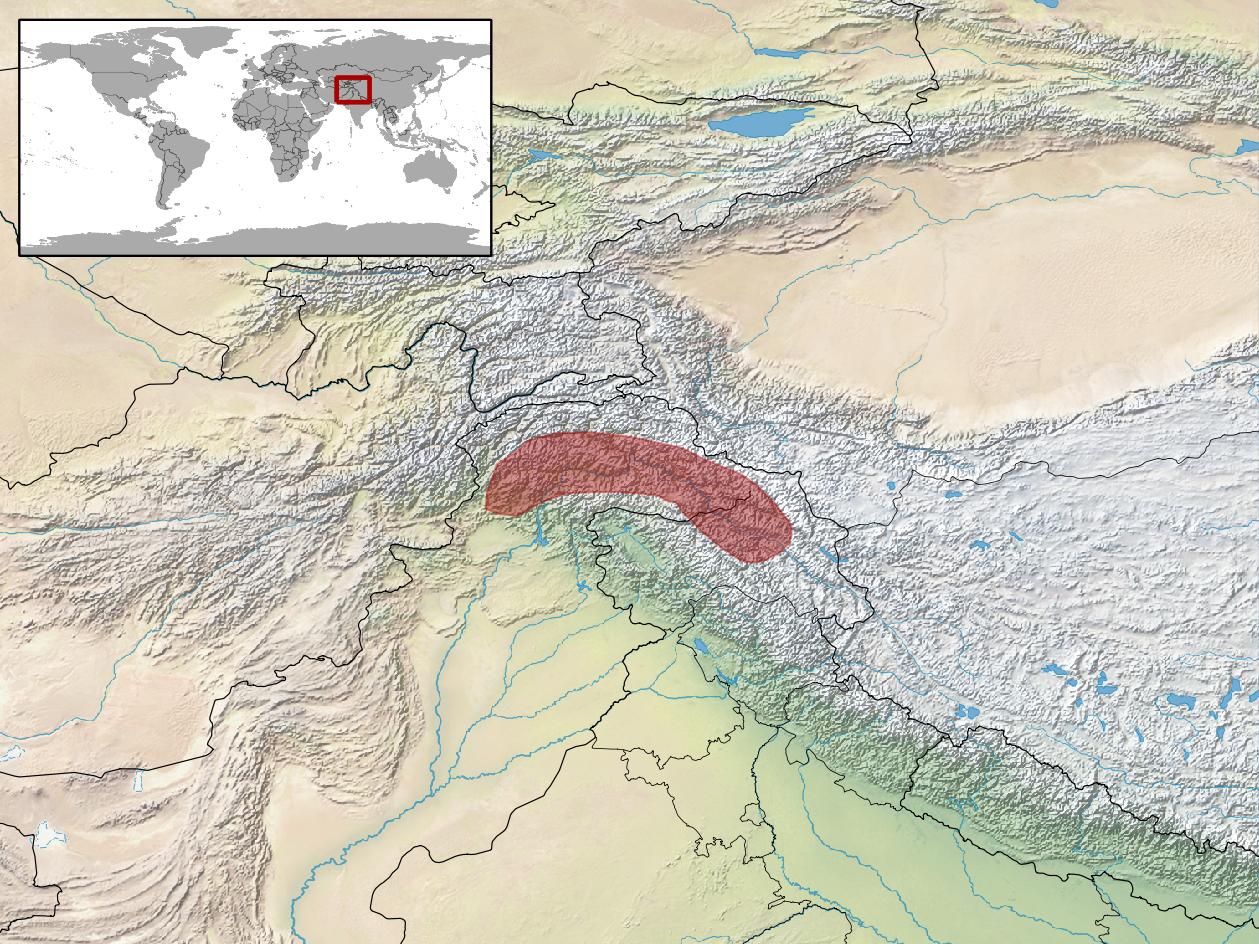

Synonyms
- Gymnodactylus stoliczkai Steindachner, 1867; Cyrtodactylus stoliczkai — Underwood, 1954; Tenuidactylus stoliczkai — Szczerbak & Golubev, 1984; Gonydactylus stoliczkai — Kluge, 1991; Alsophylax boehmei Szczerbak, 1991; Mesiodactylus stoliczkai — M.S. Khan, 2000; Cyrtopodion stoliczkai — H. Rösler, 2000; Altigecko stoliczkai — M.S. Khan, 2003; Altiphylax stoliczkai — Sindaco & Jeremčenko, 2008

= Altiphylax stoliczkai =

Species of lizard

Altiphylax stoliczkai, also known commonly as the frontier bow-fingered gecko, the Baltistan gecko, and the Karakorum gecko is a species of lizard in the family Gekkonidae. The species is endemic to South Asia.

== Etymology ==
The specific name, stoliczkai, is in honor of Moravian zoologist Ferdinand Stoliczka.

== Geographic range ==
A. stoliczkai is found in India (Kashmir, Karoo/Dras, Ladakh) and western China.

The type locality given by Steindachner is "bei Karoo, nördlich von Dras, Kashmir ".

== Habitat ==
The preferred natural habitats of A. stoliczkai are desert, grassland, and rocky areas, at altitudes of 2,300–3,700 m (7,500–12,100 ft).

== Reproduction ==
A. stoliczkai is oviparous.

== Taxonomy ==
Most authorities, most recently Bauer et al. 2013, now consider Böhme's mountain gecko to be a subspecies of this species (A. s. boehmei).
