= Microgecko laki =

Scientific classification
- Domain: Eukaryota
- Kingdom: Animalia
- Phylum: Chordata
- Class: Reptilia
- Order: Squamata
- Infraorder: Gekkota
- Family: Gekkonidae
- Genus: Microgecko
- Species: M. laki

Binomial name
- Microgecko laki Torki, 2020

Species of lizard

The Laki dwarf gecko (Microgecko laki) is a species of lizard in the family Gekkonidae. It is endemic to Iran.
