= Turkmenian thin-toed gecko =

Conservation status
- Least Concern (IUCN 3.1)

Scientific classification
- Kingdom: Animalia
- Phylum: Chordata
- Class: Reptilia
- Order: Squamata
- Suborder: Gekkota
- Family: Gekkonidae
- Genus: Tenuidactylus
- Species: T. turcmenicus

Binomial name
- Tenuidactylus turcmenicus (Szczerbak, 1978)

Synonyms
- Gymnodactylus turcmenicus; Cyrtodactylus turcmenicus; Cyrtopodion turcmenicus; Cyrtopodion turcmenicum

Species of lizard

The Turkmenian thin-toed gecko (Tenuidactylus turcmenicus) is a species of gecko that is found in eastern Turkmenistan and northern Afghanistan.
