= Leviton's gecko =

Conservation status
- Least Concern (IUCN 3.1)

Scientific classification
- Kingdom: Animalia
- Phylum: Chordata
- Class: Reptilia
- Order: Squamata
- Suborder: Gekkota
- Family: Gekkonidae
- Genus: Altiphylax
- Species: A. levitoni

Binomial name
- Altiphylax levitoni (Golubev & Szczerbak, 1979)

Synonyms
- Tropiocolotes levitoni Golubev & Szczerbak, 1979; Asiocolotes levitoni — Kluge, 1993; Altiphylax levitoni Sindaco & Jeremčenko, 2008

Species of lizard

Leviton's gecko (Altiphylax levitoni) is a species of lizard in the family Gekkonidae. The species is endemic to Asia.

== Etymology ==
The specific name, levitoni, is in honor of American herpetologist Alan E. Leviton (born 1930).

== Geographic range ==
A. levitoni is found in northeastern Afghanistan.

== Habitat ==
The preferred natural habitat of A. levitoni is rocky areas of shrubland and forest, at altitudes of 1,800–2,300 m (5,900–7,500 ft), but it has also been found on buildings and rock walls in villages.

== Reproduction ==
A. levitoni is oviparous.
