= Sherman A. Minton =

American zoologist (1919–1999)

Sherman Anthony Minton Jr. (24 February 1919 – 15 June 1999) was an American physician, herpetologist and toxinologist, who conducted the earliest detailed modern studies of amphibians and reptiles in Pakistan.

== Early life ==
Born in New Albany, Indiana, he was the son of United States Senator and Associate Justice of the United States Supreme Court Sherman Minton.

As a child in the 1930s, Sherman Junior was already collecting reptiles near his home and learning their scientific names. He wanted to study herpetology, but his father insisted on law or medicine. He chose medicine, enrolling at Indiana University Bloomington and obtaining his Bachelor of Science degree in 1939 and his M.D. from the Indiana University School of Medicine in 1942.

He met Madge Alice Shortridge Rutherford (20 March 1920 – 7 November 2004) at Bloomington in November 1937, when she introduced herself with the remark "I understand you collect snakes." They became friends but did not marry until October 1943 because of World War II.

== Madge Minton née Rutherford ==
Madge, the daughter of a teacher, was born in Greensburg, near Indianapolis, but grew up in St Paul. She was interested in natural history but even more fascinated by aircraft, she wanted to be a pilot. In 1938, Madge transferred to Butler University, Indianapolis where she embarked on an Advanced Civilian Pilot Training Program which was sponsored by the Civil Aeronautics Authority (CAA). Although she was one of the top ten students, she was refused further advancement due to her sex. Her response was to write to First Lady Eleanor Roosevelt. She subsequently received a letter admitting her to the CAA advanced pilot's program. She graduated with a Bachelor of Arts in 1941.

== Wartime service ==
Upon completion of his M.D., Sherman was commissioned an officer in the United States Navy Medical Corps and served aboard the USS Brooks (DD-232) in the Pacific War, including the Battle of Luzon in the Japanese-held Philippines. He was on board when the USS Brooks was hit by a kamikaze aircraft, but was uninjured. He served from 1943 to 1946.

When the United States entered World War II, Madge joined the Women Airforce Service Pilots (WASPs), the women who flew military aircraft to airbases. In August 1943, she completed her training and was transferred to Long Beach, California, but in August 1944 she discovered she was pregnant with the first of three daughters, and resigned to return to Indiana.

== Post war ==
Sherman was discharged from the United States navy in 1946. He did not wish to continue in medicine but preferred a career in medical microbiology with herpetology as his hobby. The now married Mintons moved to Ann Arbor, where he attended the University of Michigan from 1946 to 1947 and studied microbiology. He also studied herpetology under Norman Hartweg and Charles Walker. In September 1947, Sherman became assistant professor of microbiology and immunology at the Indiana University Medical School, a post he held until retirement in 1984.

== Pakistan years ==
During the years 1958–1962, Sherman A. Minton and his family lived in Karachi, West Pakistan, where he served as the microbiologist at the newly established Basic Medical Science Institute. The Minton's also spent much of their time traveling around Pakistan, covering some 69,000 km and collecting approximately 1,500 herpetological specimens. These four years would inextricable link Sherman and Madge Minton with the herpetofauna of Pakistan.

== Indiana ==
The Mintons returned to Indiana in 1962, where Sherman returned to his post at the Indiana University and worked on his pet project, a monograph on the amphibians and reptiles of Indiana which was published in 1972. The couple remained in Indianapolis for the rest of their lives, Sherman dying on 15 June 1999 at the age of 80 and Madge on 7 November 2004 at the age of 84.

Sherman A Minton Jr authored more than 200 books and papers on the herpetofaunas of Texas, Mexico, Central America and Pakistan, as well as papers on the seasnakes of the Asia-Pacific region, and snake venoms, especially the effects of bites from rear-fanged venomous snakes.

Madge worked as Sherman's field assistant, did his library research, cared for his live reptile collection and learned to milk venomous snakes for his research into venoms. The couple also collaborated on two popular books: Venomous Reptiles in 1971, and Giant Reptiles in 1973.

Sherman A. Minton Jr.'s autobiography, Life, Love, and Reptiles, was published posthumously in 2001.

== Reptile species described by Sherman A. Minton ==
Listed in the order they were described:

- Tantilla cucullata Minton, 1956 – Big Bend blackhead snake (Colubridae)
- Microgecko depressus (Minton & J.A. Anderson, 1965) – low-lying gecko (Gekkonidae)
- Mediodactylus heteropholis (Minton, S.C. Anderson & J.A. Anderson, 1970) – Iraqi gecko (Gekkonidae)

== Amphibian and reptiles named in honor of Sherman A. Minton ==
Listed in the order they were described:

- Proacris mintoni Holman, 1961 – a fossil frog from the Miocene of Florida (Hylidae)
- Altiphylax mintoni (Golubev & Szczerbak, 1981) – North West Frontier pygmy gecko (Gekkonidae)
- Toxicocalamus mintoni Kraus, 2009 – Sudest Island forest snake (Elapidae)

== Reptiles named in honor of Madge Minton, or both husband and wife ==
Listed in the order they were described:

- Platyceps karelini mintonorum (Mertens, 1969) – Pakistan spotted desert racer (Colubridae)
- Indotyphlops madgemintonae (Khan, 1999) – (Typhlopidae)
  - Indotyphlops madgemintonae madgemintonae (Khan, 1999) – Madge Minton's blindsnake
  - Indotyphlops madgemintonae shermani (Khan, 1999) – Sherman's blindsnake
