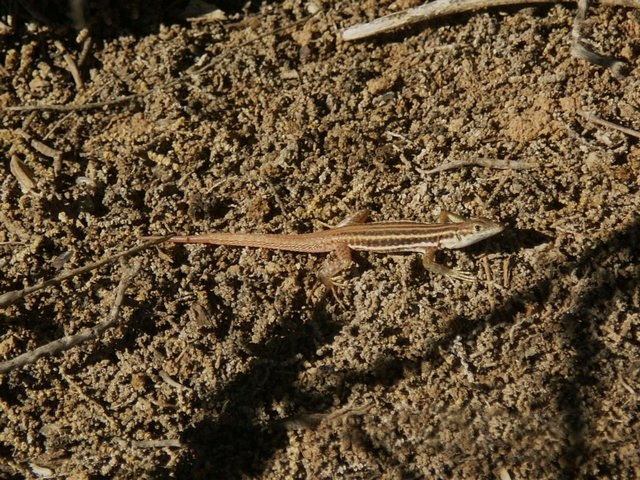
- Pedioplanis namaquensis

Scientific classification
- Kingdom: Animalia
- Phylum: Chordata
- Class: Reptilia
- Order: Squamata
- Family: Lacertidae
- Subfamily: Lacertinae
- Genus: Pedioplanis; Fitzinger, 1843

= Pedioplanis =

Genus of lizards

Pedioplanis is a genus of lizards in the family Lacertidae. All species of Pedioplanis are endemic to southern Africa.

== Species ==
There are 16 valid species in this genus:

- Pedioplanis benguelensis (Bocage, 1867) – Angolan sand lizard, Bocage's sand lizard
- Pedioplanis branchi Childers, Kirchhof, & Bauer, 2021
- Pedioplanis breviceps (Sternfeld, 1911) – short-headed sand lizard, short-headed sandveld lizard, Sternfeld's sand lizard
- Pedioplanis burchelli (A.M.C. Duméril & Bibron, 1839) – Burchell's sand lizard
- Pedioplanis gaerdesi (Mertens, 1954) – Kaokoland sand lizard, Mayer's sand lizard
- Pedioplanis haackei Conradie, Measey, Branch & Tolley, 2012
- Pedioplanis huntleyi Conradie, Measey, Branch & Tolley, 2012
- Pedioplanis husabensis Berger-Dell'mour & Mayer, 1989 – Husab lizard
- Pedioplanis inornata (Roux, 1907) – plain sand lizard, western sand lizard
- Pedioplanis laticeps (A. Smith, 1849) – Cape sand lizard, Karoo sand lizard
- Pedioplanis lineoocellata (A.M.C. Duméril & Bibron, 1839) – common sand lizard, ocellated sand lizard, spotted sand lizard
- Pedioplanis mayeri Childers, Kirchhof, & Bauer, 2021
- Pedioplanis namaquensis (A.M.C. Duméril & Bibron, 1839) – Namaqua sand lizard
- Pedioplanis rubens (Mertens, 1954) – Ruben's sand lizard, Waterberg sand lizard
- Pedioplanis serodioi Parrinha, Marques, Heinicke, Khalid, Parker, Tolley, Childers, Conradie, Bauer, & Ceriaco, 2021
- Pedioplanis undata (A. Smith, 1838) - plain sand lizard, western sand lizard

Nota bene: A binomial authority in parentheses indicates that the species was originally described in a genus other than Pedioplanis.
