= Altiphylax mintoni =

Conservation status
- Data Deficient (IUCN 3.1)

Scientific classification
- Kingdom: Animalia
- Phylum: Chordata
- Class: Reptilia
- Order: Squamata
- Suborder: Gekkota
- Family: Gekkonidae
- Genus: Altiphylax
- Species: A. mintoni

Binomial name
- Altiphylax mintoni (Golubev & Szczerbak, 1981)

Synonyms
- Gymnodactylus mintoni Golubev & Szczerbak, 1981; Tenuidactylus mintoni — Szczerbak & Golubev, 1984; Gonydactylus mintoni — Kluge, 1991; Cyrtodactylus mintoni — Kluge, 1993; Cyrtopodion mintoni — Rösler, 2000; Siwaligekko mintoni — Khan, 2003; Altiphylax mintoni — Sindaco & Jeremčenko, 2008

Species of lizard

Altiphylax mintoni, also known commonly as Minton's thin-toed gecko or the plump swati gecko, is a species of lizard in the family Gekkonidae. The species is endemic to Pakistan.

== Etymology ==
The specific name, mintoni, is in honor of American herpetologist Sherman A. Minton.

== Geographic range ==
Altiphylax mintoni is found in northern Pakistan.

== Habitat ==
The preferred natural habitat of Altiphylax mintoni is rocky areas of forest, at elevations around 2,000 m (6,600 ft).

== Reproduction ==
Altiphylax mintoni is oviparous.
