= Microgecko varaviensis =

Scientific classification
- Domain: Eukaryota
- Kingdom: Animalia
- Phylum: Chordata
- Class: Reptilia
- Order: Squamata
- Infraorder: Gekkota
- Family: Gekkonidae
- Genus: Microgecko
- Species: M. varaviensis

Binomial name
- Microgecko varaviensis Gholamifard, Rastegar-Pouyani, & Rastegar-Pouyani, 2019

Species of lizard

Microgecko varaviensis is a species of lizard in the family Gekkonidae. It is endemic to Iran.
