= Low lying gecko =

Conservation status
- Least Concern (IUCN 3.1)

Scientific classification
- Kingdom: Animalia
- Phylum: Chordata
- Class: Reptilia
- Order: Squamata
- Suborder: Gekkota
- Family: Gekkonidae
- Genus: Microgecko
- Species: M. depressus

Binomial name
- Microgecko depressus (Minton & J.A. Anderson, 1965)

Synonyms
- Tropiocolotes depressus Minton & J.A. Anderson, 1965; Asiocolotes depressus — Kluge, 1993; Microgecko depressus Sindaco & Jeremčenko, 2008

Species of lizard

The low-lying gecko (Microgecko depressus) is a species of lizard in the family Gekkonidae. The species is endemic to western Pakistan.

== Locomotion ==
M. depressus assumes a "serpentine" position for a short period of time when alarmed or threatened. This type of locomotive pattern resumes after a slow jerk, whilst advancing in this position each halt (or stoppage).

== Reproduction ==
M. depressus is oviparous.
