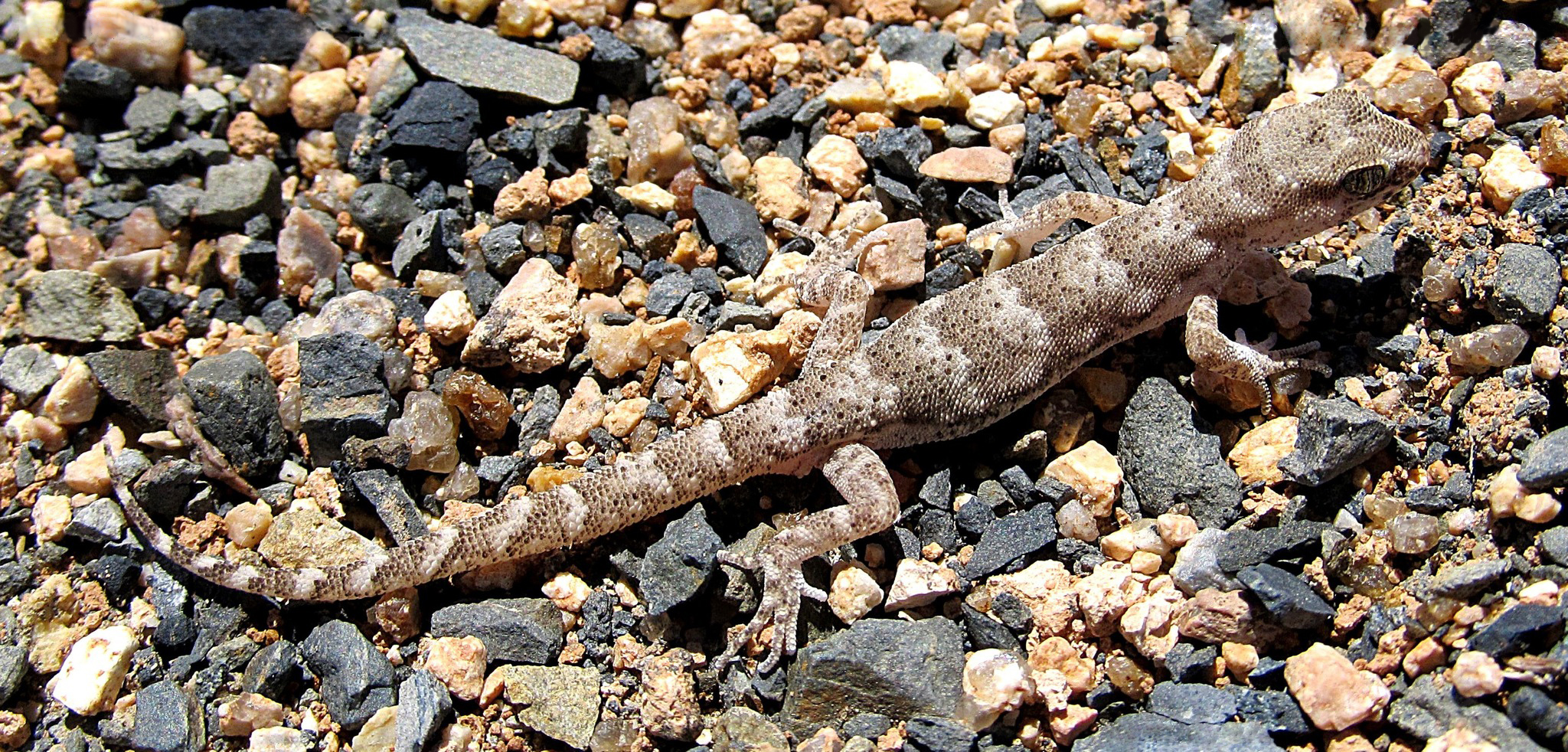
- Alsophylax pipiens

Scientific classification
- Kingdom: Animalia
- Phylum: Chordata
- Class: Reptilia
- Order: Squamata
- Suborder: Gekkota
- Family: Gekkonidae
- Subfamily: Gekkoninae
- Genus: Alsophylax; Fitzinger, 1843

= Alsophylax =

Genus of lizards

Alsophylax is a genus of small species of geckos, endemic to Central Asia, commonly known as even-fingered geckos. The snout-vent length of these geckos is normally no more than 4 cm (1.6 in). Little is known of their ecology or reproductive habits.

== Species ==
The following eight species are recognized.

- Alsophylax emilia (Nazarov, Abduraupov, Shepelya, Gritsina, Melnikov, Buehler, Lapin, Poyarkov & Grismer, 2023)
- Alsophylax ferganensis (Nazarov, Abduraupov, Shepelya, Gritsina, Melnikov, Buehler, Lapin, Poyarkov & Grismer, 2023)
- Alsophylax laevis (Nikolsky), 1907 - southern even-fingered gecko
- Alsophylax loricatus (Strauch), 1887 - Strauch's even-fingered gecko
- Alsophylax pipiens (Pallas, 1827) - even-fingered gecko
- Alsophylax przewalskii (Strauch, 1887) - Xinjiang even-fingered gecko
- Alsophylax szczerbaki (Golubev & Sattarov, 1979) - Szczerbak's even-fingered gecko
- Alsophylax tadjikiensis (Golubev, 1979) - Tadjikistan even-fingered gecko

Nota bene: A binomial authority in parentheses indicates that the species was originally described in a genus other than Alsophylax.
