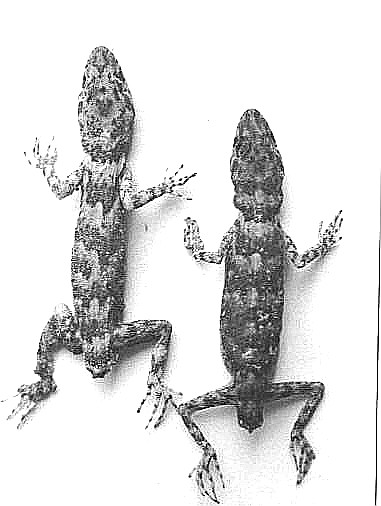

Scientific classification
- Kingdom: Animalia
- Phylum: Chordata
- Class: Reptilia
- Order: Squamata
- Suborder: Gekkota
- Family: Gekkonidae
- Genus: Altiphylax
- Species: A. baturensis

Binomial name
- Altiphylax baturensis (Khan & Baig, 1992)

Synonyms
- Tenuidactylus baturensis Khan & Baig, 1992; Cyrtodactylus baturensis (Khan & Baig, 1992); Mesodactylus baturensis (Khan & Baig, 1992); Altigekko baturensis (Khan & Baig, 1992); Cyrtopodion baturense (Khan & Baig, 1992); Cyrtopodion baturensis (Khan & Baig, 1992); Altiphylax baturensis (Khan & Baig, 1992)

= Batura Glacier gecko =

Species of lizard

The Batura Glacier gecko (Altiphylax baturensis), also known commonly as the Batura thin-toed gecko, is a species of lizard in the family Gekkonidae. The species is endemic to Pakistan.

== Geographic range ==
A. baturensis is found in northern Pakistan.
