= Tadjikistan even-fingered gecko =

Conservation status
- Critically Endangered (IUCN 3.1)

Scientific classification
- Kingdom: Animalia
- Phylum: Chordata
- Class: Reptilia
- Order: Squamata
- Suborder: Gekkota
- Family: Gekkonidae
- Genus: Alsophylax
- Species: A. tadjikiensis

Binomial name
- Alsophylax tadjikiensis Golubev, 1979

Synonyms
- Alsophylax laevis tadjikiensis

Species of lizard

The Tadjikistan even-fingered gecko (Alsophylax tadjikiensis) is a species of gecko found in Tajikistan.
