= Szczerbak's even-fingered gecko =

Conservation status
- Vulnerable (IUCN 3.1)

Scientific classification
- Kingdom: Animalia
- Phylum: Chordata
- Class: Reptilia
- Order: Squamata
- Suborder: Gekkota
- Family: Gekkonidae
- Genus: Alsophylax
- Species: A. szczerbaki

Binomial name
- Alsophylax szczerbaki Golubev & Sattarov, 1979

Synonyms
- Alsophylax loricatus szczerbaki

Species of lizard

Szczerbak's even-fingered gecko (Alsophylax szczerbaki) is a species of gecko found in Turkmenistan and Uzbekistan.
