= Animals (journal) =

- Discipline: Zoology
- Language: English
- Edited by: Clive J. C. Phillips

Publication details
- History: 2011–present
- Publisher: MDPI
- Frequency: Continuous
- Open access: Yes
- License: Creative Commons Attribution License
- Impact factor: 3.2 (2025)

Standard abbreviations
- ISO 4: Animals

Indexing
- ISSN: 2076-2615
- OCLC no.: 667255765

Links
- Journal homepage

Animals is a peer-reviewed open-access scientific journal that covers all areas of animal biology, including behavior, physiology, genetics, and ecology. It is published by MDPI and was established in 2011. The editor-in-chief is Clive J. C. Phillips (Estonian University of Life Sciences and Curtin University).

The journal publishes original research articles, review articles, and short communications.

== Abstracting and indexing ==
The journal is abstracted and indexed in:

- CAB Abstracts
- Current Contents/Agriculture, Biology & Environmental Sciences
- EBSCO databases
- Embase
- Food Science and Technology Abstracts
- ProQuest databases
- PubMed
- Science Citation Index Expanded
- Scopus
- The Zoological Record

According to the Journal Citation Reports, the journal has a 2025 impact factor of 3.2.
