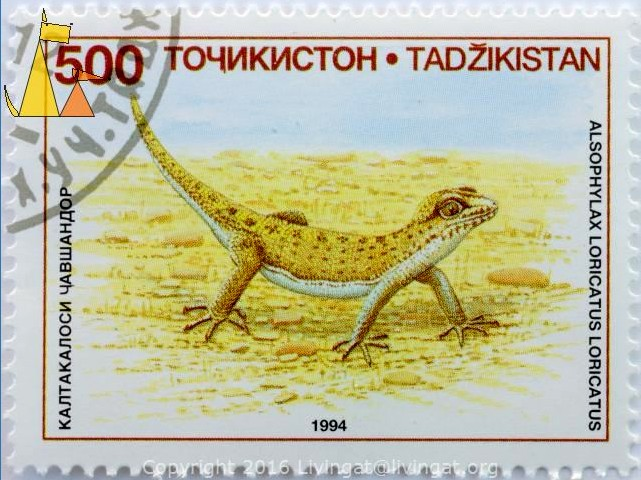

Conservation status
- Vulnerable (IUCN 3.1)

Scientific classification
- Kingdom: Animalia
- Phylum: Chordata
- Class: Reptilia
- Order: Squamata
- Suborder: Gekkota
- Family: Gekkonidae
- Genus: Alsophylax
- Species: A. loricatus

Binomial name
- Alsophylax loricatus Strauch, 1887

= Strauch's even-fingered gecko =

Species of lizard

Strauch's even-fingered gecko (Alsophylax loricatus) is a species of gecko found in Tajikistan, Uzbekistan, and perhaps Kyrgyzstan.
