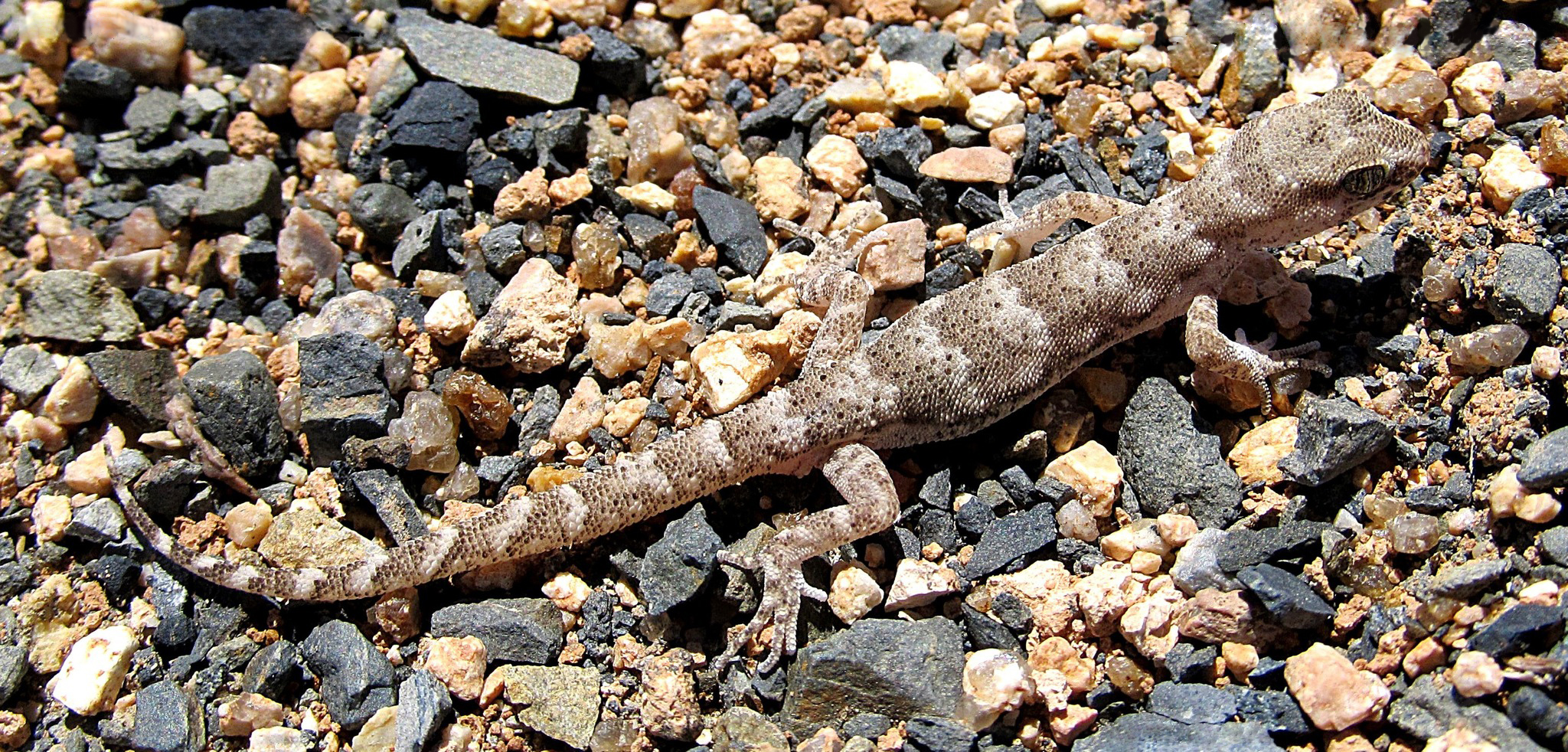

Conservation status
- Least Concern (IUCN 3.1)

Scientific classification
- Kingdom: Animalia
- Phylum: Chordata
- Class: Reptilia
- Order: Squamata
- Suborder: Gekkota
- Family: Gekkonidae
- Genus: Alsophylax
- Species: A. pipiens

Binomial name
- Alsophylax pipiens Pallas, 1827
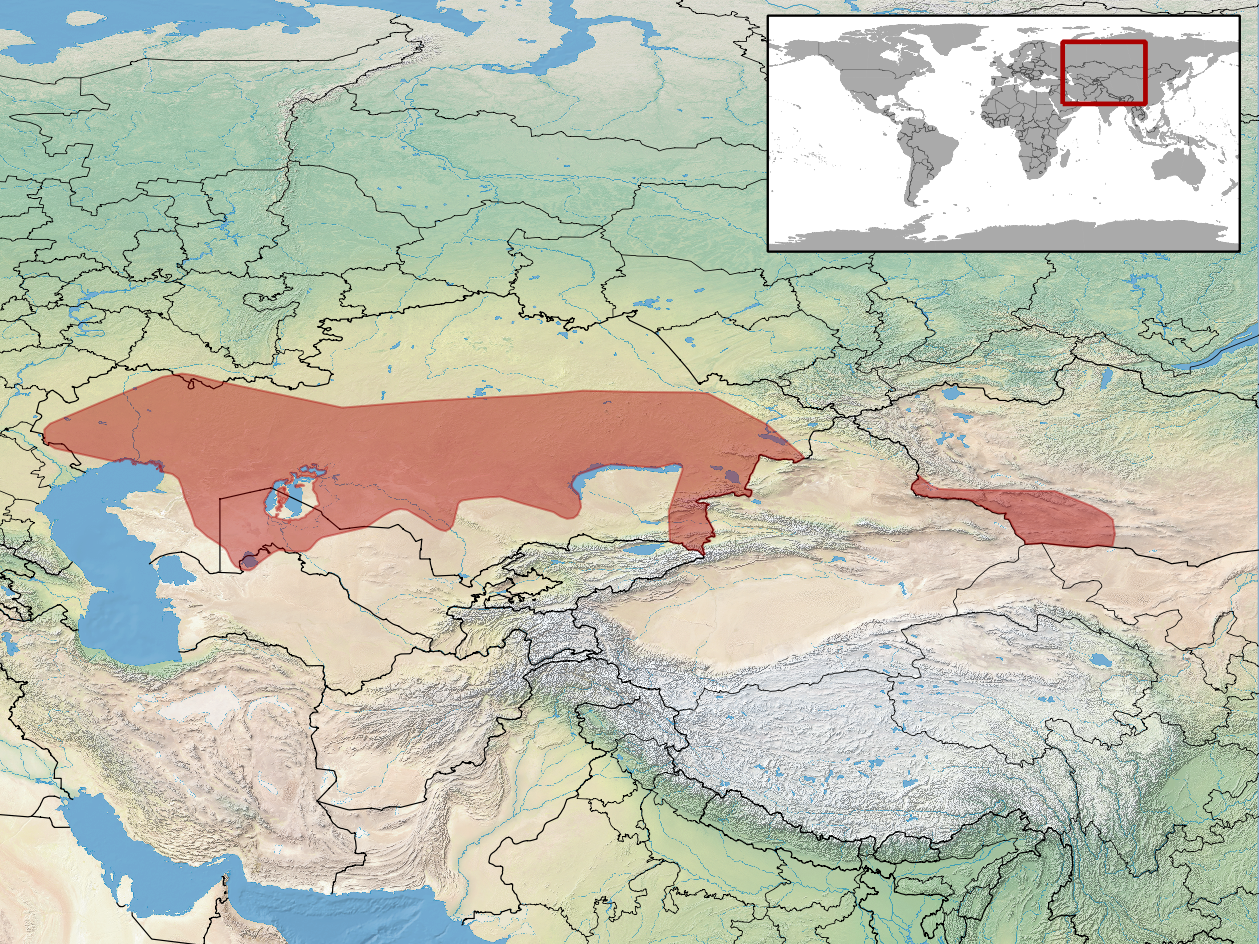

= Alsophylax pipiens =

Species of lizard

Alsophylax pipiens, also known as the even-fingered gecko, is a species of gecko found in Mongolia (Gobi Desert), former USSR between Wolga and Ural; Kazakhstan (Caspian Sea to Lake Zaysan) south to Uzbekistan, N Turkmenistan, Kyrgyzstan, NW China and S Russia (Astrakhan Oblast).
