= Southern even-fingered gecko =

Conservation status
- Critically Endangered (IUCN 3.1)

Scientific classification
- Kingdom: Animalia
- Phylum: Chordata
- Class: Reptilia
- Order: Squamata
- Suborder: Gekkota
- Family: Gekkonidae
- Genus: Alsophylax
- Species: A. laevis

Binomial name
- Alsophylax laevis Nikolsky, 1907

Species of lizard

The southern even-fingered gecko (Alsophylax laevis) is a ground and tree dwelling species of gecko found in Turkmenistan, Uzbekistan, Iran, Tajikistan and Afghanistan. This species of gecko lives in the desert and shrublands. The Gecko is part of a divergence from the Squamata order around 65 million years ago, and the species is part of the family Gekkonidae. Limited research has been done on the southern even-fingered gecko due to the fact that the species is critically endangered. The Gecko has only been captured once in recent years. In 2020 it was captured for the first time since 1963. Conservation efforts are being put in place to mitigate the harm caused to the habitat of the gecko.

== Distribution and habitat ==
The Southern Even-fingered Gecko is a species of gecko that can be found in southern Turkmenistan, southern Uzbekistan, northern Iran, Tajikistan and northern Afghanistan. The gecko lives in a somewhat sporadic area across these countries in what can be known as a "broken zone district". This means that the populations of the gecko are not consistent across the regions. The general area in which they are found tends to be around 200-250 meters above sea level.

== Behavior and ecology ==
The behavior of the Southern Even-fingered Gecko is still mostly unknown as they have only been spotted a few times over the last few decades. The Ecology of the Gecko is more understood, as the sightings have been in a small region. In the countries Afghanistan, Turkmenistan, Uzbekistan, Iran, and Tajikistan the gecko lives in the Badghyz and Karabil semi-desert. The biome in these areas is classified as Deserts and Xeric Shrublands. In the countries Turkmenistan, Uzbekistan, and Kazakhstan, the gecko has been spotted in the Central Asian southern desert which is again part of the Deserts and Xeric Shrublands biomes. In Iran and Turkmenistan the gecko is found in the Kopet Dag semi-desert as well as the Kopet Dag woodlands and forest steppe. These areas are classified in the deserts, xeric shrublands, Montane Grasslands, and shrublands biomes. All of these realms belong to the Palearctic realm.

== Characteristics ==
The Southern Even-fingered Gecko is a relatively small type of gecko weighing about 1 gram total for males and females. Their only form of transportation is through running. The symmetry of the gecko is bilateral meaning the gecko is symmetric running head to tail and having nearly identical right and left sides. The Gecko has an otolith auditory system which is an inner-ear system that can detect acceleration and possible acoustic signals. The visual system that the Geckos have is through corneal eyes similar to that of a human. They are a nocturnal species which reproduce through Oviparous reproduction. Meaning that the species lays eggs outside of the mother as a form of reproduction. The gecko lays eggs in litters of 1 about 1-2 times per year. The eggs are measured at a length of about 9 mm with a width of about 7mm. The gestation period of the eggs is around 56 days. The snout to vent length on the gecko is about 3 mm. The total length of the gecko is around 2.5 inches or 64 mm.

== Diet ==
The diet of the Southern even-fingered gecko is largely unknown, but most desert geckos tend to eat the same things. Since they are a nocturnal animal, they tend to hunt nocturnal insects as well, but will hunt any insect available. This would include insects such as ants, beetles, termites, moths, and crickets. They will also eat centipedes, millipedes, spiders, and worms. In times where food is scarce, they will use energy from fat stored in their tails.

== Conservation ==
The Southern Even-fingered Gecko is listed as critically endangered on the IUCN red list. Over the last 20-30 years the Southern even-fingered gecko has lost substantial habitat due to agriculture, overgrazing, and habitat destruction. Due to the declining loss of habitat there are some conservation efforts being put into place to help the livelihoods of the gecko, but as of now none of these efforts have been implemented. In the Uzbekistan and Turkmenistan region, research is being done to establish the gecko's distribution to identify strict protection areas. In these areas water sources are set to be improved to help the gecko as well as other types of wildlife. The final conservation idea would be to mitigate livestock interference by separating water sites in the valleys. This would reduce grazing and trampling of large animals on the habitat of the gecko. As of late 2023 though they are not in any protected areas, so a special reserve could be beneficial to help restore the population of the gecko.
