= Mykola Szczerbak =

Ukrainian academic

Mykola Mykolaiovych Szczerbak
- Born: 31 October 1927; Kyiv, USSR
- Died: 27 January 1998 (aged 70); Kyiv, Ukraine
- Education: Kyiv University
- Scientific career
- Fields: zoology, ecology, herpetology
- Workplaces: I. I. Schmalhausen Institute of Zoology, National Museum of Natural History at the National Academy of Sciences of Ukraine

Mykola Mykolaiovych Szczerbak (also Nikolai Nikolayevich, also Shcherbak; Ukrainian: Микола Миколайович Щербак; 31 October 1927 – 27 January 1998) was a Ukrainian zoologist and ecologist, a prolific herpetologist, a full professor, and a Corresponding Member of the National Academy of Sciences of Ukraine.

== Biography ==
Mykola Shcherbak was born on 31 October 1927 in Kyiv. From 1945 to 1948, he studied at Kyiv State University in the Faculty of Biology. In 1948, he was sentenced by the Special Council under Articles 54-1a and 54-11 of the Criminal Code of the Ukrainian SSR in the case of the Kyiv city branch of the Organization of Ukrainian Nationalists (OUN), which had been organized among students and young people in the city. Fifteen people were involved in the case, including I. Velihurskyi, P. Benediuk, O. Hordiichuk, I. Pronkin, I. Denysenko, H. Havdio, Y. Haiduk, E. Khomenko, H. Pidoplichko, A. Marchenko, Y. Lisniak, M. Shcherbak, N. Deineko, L. Marchenko, and V. Tymchenko. Until 1954, he served his sentence in Dubravlag in Mordovia, at Potma, as prisoner No. Ch-995. From 1955 to 1957, he continued his studies at Kyiv State University.

From 1958, Shcherbak worked as a senior laboratory assistant in the Department of Vertebrate Zoology at the Institute of Zoology of the Academy of Sciences of the Ukrainian SSR. That year, he made his first expedition to the Lankaran Lowland in Azerbaijan to collect material for the Zoological Museum. From 1959 to 1962, he was a graduate student in the Department of Vertebrate Zoology at the Institute of Zoology. In 1963, he defended his candidate's dissertation at Leningrad State University on the topic The Herpetofauna of Crimea and Its Zoogeographical Analysis, and was awarded the degree of Candidate of Biological Sciences. From 1964, he was a senior research fellow in the Department of Zoology and head of a non-structural division of the Zoological Museum, and from 1965 he headed a department at the Institute of Zoology. In 1967, a new exhibition at the Zoological Museum was opened, created under the direction and with the participation of Shcherbak. In 1972, he defended his doctoral dissertation at the Institute of Zoology of the Academy of Sciences of the Ukrainian SSR on the topic Lizards of the Genus Eremias of the Palearctic. In 1973, he was awarded the degree of Doctor of Biological Sciences.

In 1977, Shcherbak was awarded the D. K. Zabolotny Prize of the Academy of Sciences of the Ukrainian SSR for a series of works on the systematics, ecology, and parasitofauna of reptiles of the Palearctic. In 1982, he was awarded the academic title of professor, and in 1987 he received the honorary title of Honored Worker of Science and Technology of the Ukrainian SSR. On 25 November 1992, he was elected a corresponding member of the National Academy of Sciences of Ukraine.

Shcherbak died on 27 January 1998 at the age of 70 in Kyiv. He was buried with his wife at Baikove Cemetery (plot No. 52).

His wife was the zoologist and professor Halyna Yosypivna Shcherbak (née Pirianyk). His younger brother, Yurii Shcherbak, was a physician, writer, and professor. His nephew Yaroslav, a cardiologist, died in 2020 from COVID-19. His niece is Bohdana.

== Described species of reptiles ==
- Darevskia lindholmi (Szczerbak, 1962)
- Eremias kopetdaghica Szczerbak, 1972
- Eremias andersoni Darevsky & Szczerbak, 1978
- Tenuidactylus turcmenicus (Szczerbak, 1978)
- Teratoscincus rustamowi (Szczerbak, 1979)
- Altiphylax levitoni (Golubev & Szczerbak, 1979)
- Altiphylax mintoni (Golubev & Szczerbak, 1981)
- Altiphylax tokobajevi (Eremchenko & Szczerbak, 1984)
- Eremias afghanistanica W. Böhme & Szczerbak, 1991
- Gekko badenii Szczerbak & Nekrasova, 1994
- Cyrtodactylus paradoxus (Darevsky & Szczerbak, 1997)

== Species of reptiles named in honor of Prof. Szczerbak ==
- Darevskia szczerbaki (Lukina, 1963)
- Alsophylax szczerbaki Golubev & Sattarov, 1979
- Eremias szczerbaki Jeremčenko, Panfilov & Zarinenko, 1992
- Emydocephalus szczerbaki Dotsenko, 2011
