= Mahabharata (disambiguation) =

The Mahabharata is one of the two major Sanskrit epics of ancient India, the other being the Ramayana.

Mahabharata or Mahabharat may also refer to:

== Literature ==
- Andhra Mahabharatam (11-14th century CE), the Telugu version of Mahabaratha written by Kavitrayam (Trinity of Poets)
- Mahabharata (Indonesia), 1157 CE, the Indonesian, Javanese translation Bharatayuddha
- Mahabharata Tatparya Nirnaya, by the 13th-century Indian philosopher Madhavacharya
- Mahabharata (Rajagopalachari book), 1958, an abridged translation to English by C. Rajagopalachari
- The Mahabharata (Narayan book), 1978, an abridged translation to English by R. K. Narayan
- The Mahābhārata (Smith book), a translation of the Mahabharata by John D. Smith
- The Mahabharata (play), a 1985 French play by Jean-Claude Carrière and Peter Brook
- Mahabharata (comics), 1985, a comic adaptation of Mahabharata in 42 issues by Amar Chitra Katha
- The Mahabharata Secret, a 2013 novel by Christopher C. Doyle
  - The Mahabharata Quest: The Alexander Secret, its 2014 sequel by Doyle

== Film and television ==
- Mahabharat (1965 film), an Indian film directed by Babubhai Mistri
- Mahabharat (1988 TV series), an Indian television series (aired 1988–1990), produced by B. R. Chopra
- The Mahabharata (1989 film), a film directed by Peter Brook
- Mahabharat Katha, a 1997 Indian television series
- Ek Aur Mahabharat, a 1997 Indian television series
- Kahaani Hamaaray Mahaabhaarat Ki, a 2008 Indian television series, produced by Ekta Kapoor
- Mahabharat (2013 TV series), an Indian mythological series
- Mahabharatham (TV series), an Indian Tamil-language mythological soap opera
- Mahabharat (2013 film), a 3D animated film directed by Amaan Khan
- The Mahabharata (Randamoozham film adaptation), an unfinished Indian film adaptation of M. T. Vasudevan Nair's novel Randamoozham

== Places ==
- Mahabharat Range, also known as the Lesser Himalaya
- Mahabharat, Nepal

== See also ==
- Razmnama, a 16th century Persian translation of the epic
  - Razmnamah (British Library, Or. 12076), its manuscript
- Nartanasala, a 1963 Indian Telugu-language film directed by Kamalakara Kameswara Rao
  - Nartanasala (disambiguation)
- Mahabharata War or Kurukshetra War, the war featured as the central plot of the epic
- Mahabharat Murders, Indian web series
- Ablepharus mahabharatus, a reptile species
