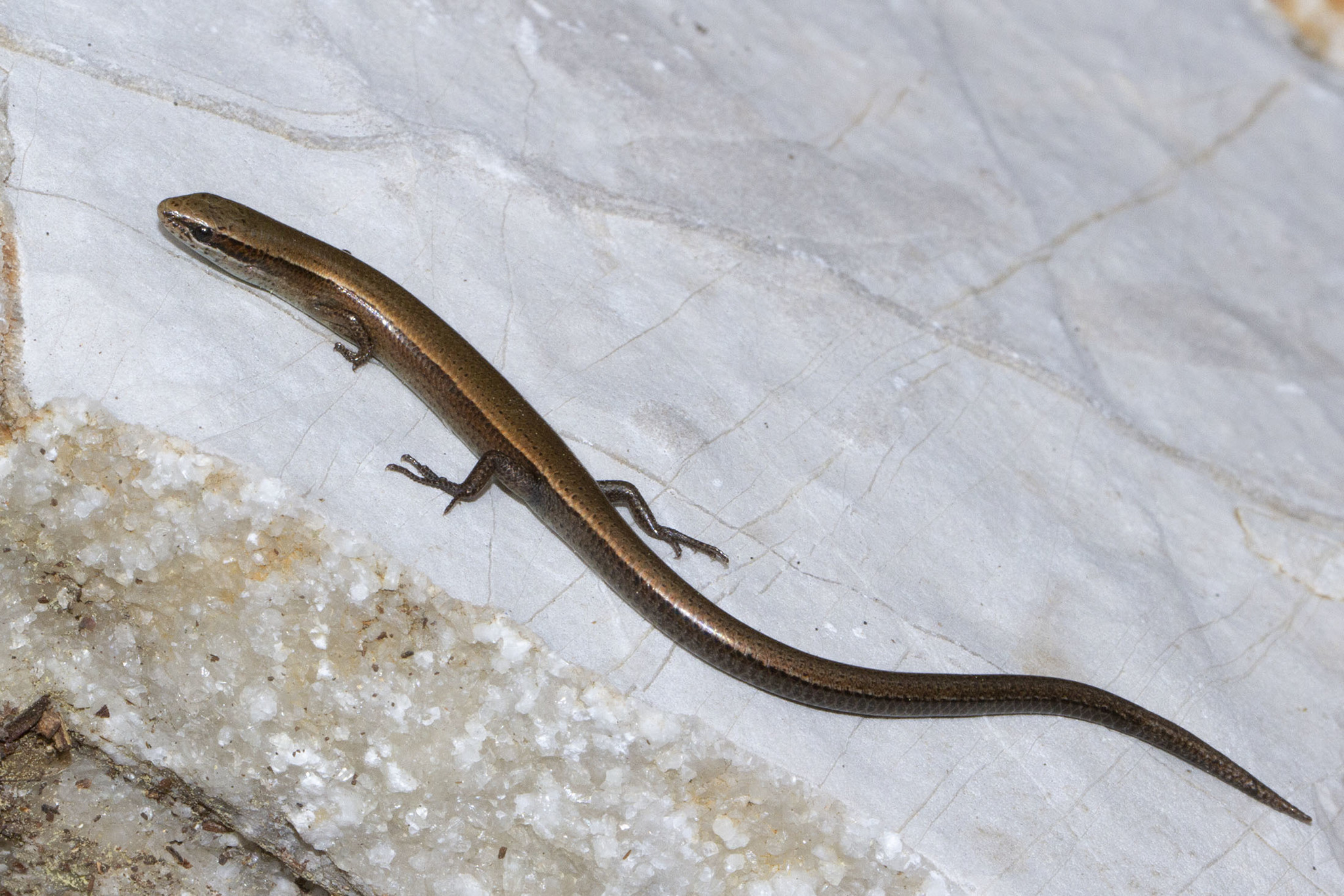

Scientific classification
- Kingdom: Animalia
- Phylum: Chordata
- Class: Reptilia
- Order: Squamata
- Family: Scincidae
- Subfamily: Eugongylinae
- Genus: Ablepharus
- Species: A. anatolicus

Binomial name
- Ablepharus anatolicus Schmidtler, 1997

= Ablepharus anatolicus =

Species of lizard

Ablepharus anatolicus, commonly known as the Anatolian snake-eyed skink is a species of skink native to the Anatolian peninsula in the Republic of Türkiye. It is one of 35 species of lizards collectively called "snake-eyed skinks;" like snakes, they lack eyelids, instead having a layer of clear scales which cover the eye.

== Distribution ==
An ecological niche modeling study conducted in 2021 found that the Anatolian snake-eyed skink occupies a geographically distinct niche from Budak's snake-eyed skink (Ablepharus budukai). The Anatolian snake-eyed skink is primarily distributed in the southern ranges of the eastern Taurus mountains.

== Description and taxonomy ==
Ablepharus anatolicus was first described by Josef Friedrich Schmidtler in 1997 as a subspecies of Budak's snake-eyed skink, which was itself previously described as a subspecies of the European snake-eyed skink, Ablephaus kitaibelli. A. anatolicus was later determined to be a phylogenetically distinct species; it can be distinguished from A. budaki budaki by its front supralabial plate morphology. The type specimens are held at the Zoologische Staatssammlung München.

A study published in 2024 noted similarities in hemipenial morphology between A. anatolicus and Chernov's skink (Ablepharus chernovi) suggesting possible synonymy between the two species.
