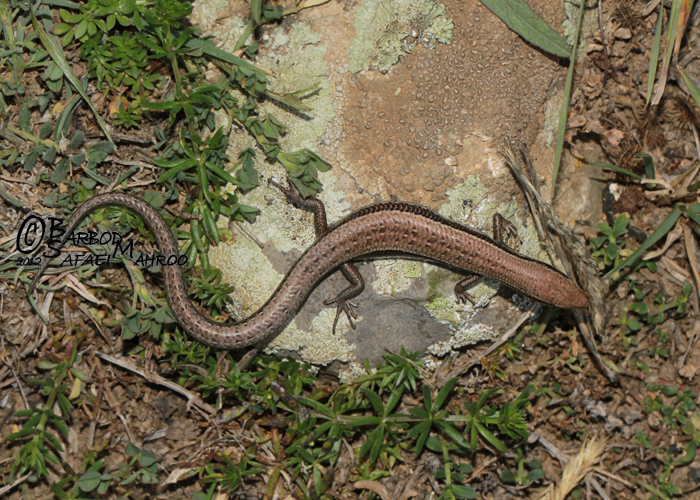

Conservation status
- Least Concern (IUCN 3.1)

Scientific classification
- Kingdom: Animalia
- Phylum: Chordata
- Class: Reptilia
- Order: Squamata
- Family: Scincidae
- Subfamily: Eugongylinae
- Genus: Ablepharus
- Species: A. bivittatus

Binomial name
- Ablepharus bivittatus (Menetries, 1832)

Subspecies
- Ablepharus bivittatus bivittatus Ablepharus bivittatus lindbergi

Synonyms
- Asymblepharus bivittatus; Ablepharus menestriesii; Scincus bivittatus

= Twin-striped skink =

Species of lizard

The twin-striped skink (Ablepharus bivittatus) is a skink native to Armenia, Azerbaijan, Turkmenistan, northwestern Iran and Turkey. It is generally found at elevations between 2,300 metres (7,500 ft) and 3,300 metres (10,800 ft).
