= Ablepharus ladacensis =

Conservation status
- Least Concern (IUCN 3.1)

Scientific classification
- Kingdom: Animalia
- Phylum: Chordata
- Class: Reptilia
- Order: Squamata
- Family: Scincidae
- Genus: Ablepharus
- Species: A. ladacensis

Binomial name
- Ablepharus ladacensis (Günther, 1864)

Synonyms
- Scincella ladacensis

Species of lizard

Ablepharus ladacensis, also known as the Ladak ground skink, is a species of skink found in Tibet (China), North India, western Nepal, and northern Pakistan.

Two subspecies are recognized:

- Ablepharus ladacensis ladacensis (Günther, 1864)
- Ablepharus ladacensis stimsoni (Eremchenko, 1992)
