= John D. Smith =

British Sanskrit expert (born 1946)

John Dargavel Smith (born August 26, 1946) is a former professor of Sanskrit at Cambridge.

Smith's studies have primarily focused on topics in the language/literature/culture of Rajasthan. Much of this time was devoted to a major project on the hero-deity Pabuji: this was published in 1991 as The epic of Pabuji (Cambridge University Press).

Smith earned a BA degree in Oriental Studies (Sanskrit and Hindi) 1968 and a PhD in 1974. He was appointed Lecturer in Sanskrit at the School of Oriental and African Studies 1975; University Lecturer in Sanskrit at Cambridge 1984, and became promoted Reader in Sanskrit, October 2001. He retired in September 2007.

Smith is interested in Hindu mythology and epic narrative. In 2009, he published an abridged translation of the Mahabharata with Penguin Classics. Professor Smith is also interested in the application of computers to textual study.

== Selected publications ==
- The Vīsaḷadevarāsa: a restoration of the text. Cambridge: C.U.P., 1976
- The epic of Pābūjī: a study, transcription and translation. Cambridge: C.U.P., 1991
  - The epic of Pabuji [popular second edition]. New Delhi: Katha, 2005.
- The Mahābhārata: an abridged translation. Penguin Books, 2009.
