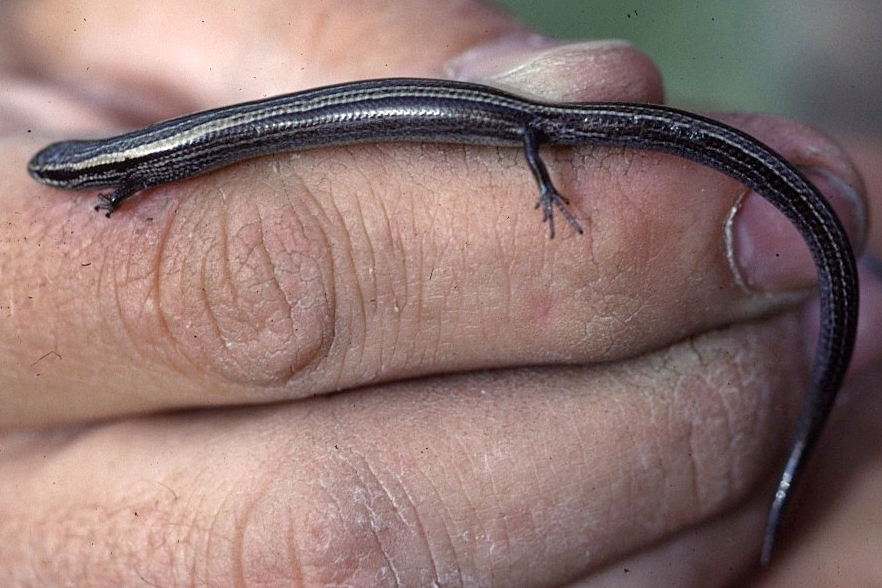

Conservation status
- Least Concern (IUCN 3.1)

Scientific classification
- Kingdom: Animalia
- Phylum: Chordata
- Class: Reptilia
- Order: Squamata
- Family: Scincidae
- Genus: Ablepharus
- Species: A. chernovi

Binomial name
- Ablepharus chernovi Darevsky, 1953

Subspecies
- Four, see text.

Synonyms
- Ablepharus chernovi Darevsky, 1953; Ablepharus kitaibelii cernovi Bischoff, 1978 (ex errore); Ablepharus kitaibelii chernovi — Engelmann et al., 1993; Ablepharus chernovi chernovi — J.F. Schmidtler, 1997

= Chernov's skink =

Species of lizard

Chernov's skink (Ablepharus chernovi) is a species of skink, a lizard in the family Scincidae. The species is endemic to northern Eurasia.

== Geographic range ==
A. chernovi is native to Armenia, eastern Turkey, northern Syria, and the valleys of the Arax River and the Hrazdan River in the Caucasus. Records from Syria may represent another species, A. rueppellii.

== Conservation status ==
A. chernovi was included in Red Data Book of the USSR in 1984, and in that of Armenia three years later.

== Etymology ==
The specific name, chernovi, is in honour of Russian herpetologist Sergius Alexandrovich Chernov.

== Subspecies ==
Four subspecies of Ablepharus chernovi are recognized as being valid, including the nominotypical subspecies.

- Ablepharus chernovi chernovi Darevsky, 1953
- Ablepharus chernovi eiselti J.F. Schmidtler, 1997
- Ablepharus chernovi isauriensis J.F. Schmidtler, 1997
- Ablepharus chernovi ressli J.F. Schmidtler, 1997

== Habitat ==
The preferred natural habitats of A. chernovi are grassland, shrubland, and forest, at altitudes of 500–2,200 m (1,600–7,200 ft).

== Reproduction ==
A. chernovi is oviparous. An adult female may lay a clutch of up to four eggs in June.
