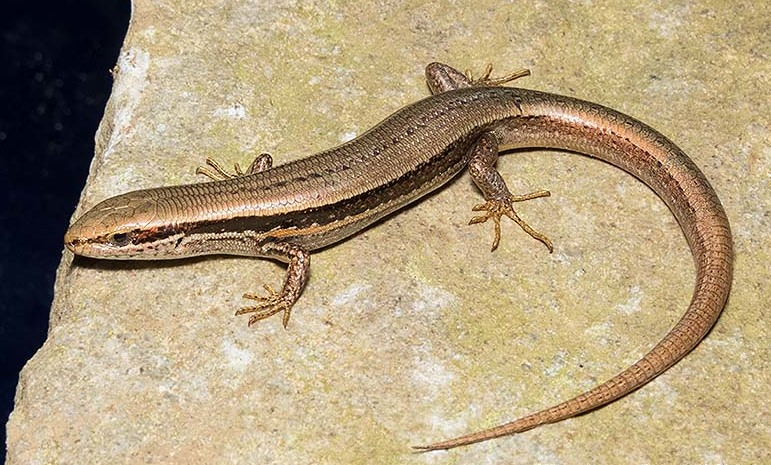

Conservation status
- Least Concern (IUCN 3.1)

Scientific classification
- Kingdom: Animalia
- Phylum: Chordata
- Class: Reptilia
- Order: Squamata
- Suborder: Scinciformata
- Infraorder: Scincomorpha
- Family: Eugongylidae
- Genus: Ablepharus
- Species: A. himalayanus

Binomial name
- Ablepharus himalayanus (Günther, 1864)

= Ablepharus himalayanus =

Species of lizard

The Himalaya ground skink (Ablepharus himalayanus) is a species of skink found in Pakistan, India, Nepal, and Turkmenistan.
