= Ablepharus darvazi =

Conservation status
- Data Deficient (IUCN 3.1)

Scientific classification
- Kingdom: Animalia
- Phylum: Chordata
- Class: Reptilia
- Order: Squamata
- Family: Scincidae
- Genus: Ablepharus
- Species: A. darvazi

Binomial name
- Ablepharus darvazi Yeriomchenko & Panfilov, 1990

Species of lizard

Ablepharus darvazi, also known as Darvaz snake-eyed skink, is a species of skink, a lizard in the family Scincidae. The species is endemic to Central Asia.

== Geographic range ==
Ablepharus darvazi is known only from the Darvaz and Khozratishokh Ridges in Badakshan, Tajikistan. The species may live in the nearby areas of Afghanistan, India, and Pakistan.

== Habitat ==
Ablepharus darvazi inhabits bushes and montane forest, reaching the alpine zone. It occurs at elevations of 2,000–2,500 m (6,600–8,200 ft) above sea level.
