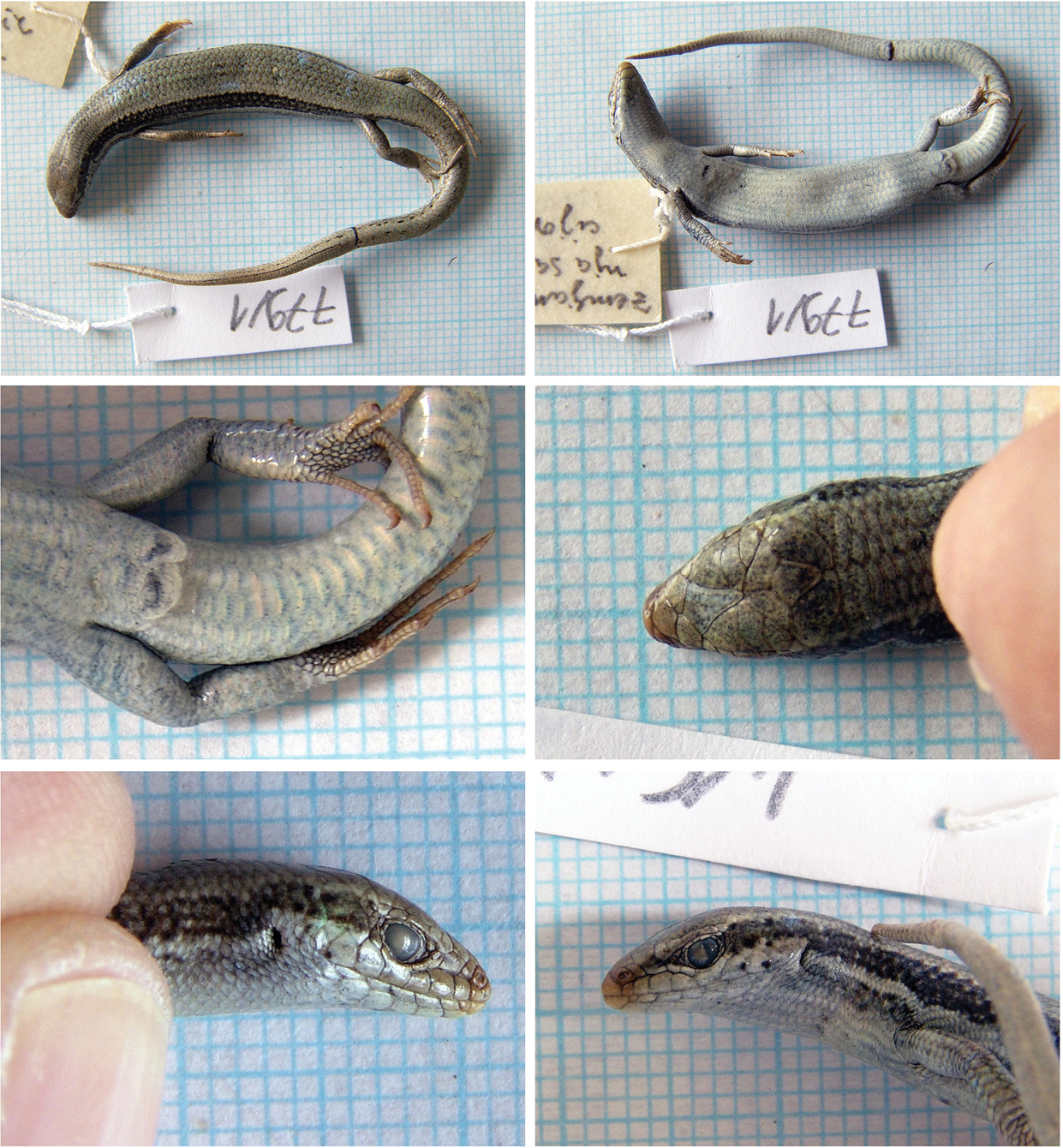

Conservation status
- Least Concern (IUCN 3.1)

Scientific classification
- Kingdom: Animalia
- Phylum: Chordata
- Class: Reptilia
- Order: Squamata
- Family: Scincidae
- Genus: Ablepharus
- Species: A. lindbergi

Binomial name
- Ablepharus lindbergi Wettstein, 1960

= Ablepharus lindbergi =

Species of lizard

Ablepharus lindbergi, Lindberg's snake-eyed skink or Lindberg's twin-striped skink, is a species of lizard in the family Scincidae. It is endemic to Afghanistan.
