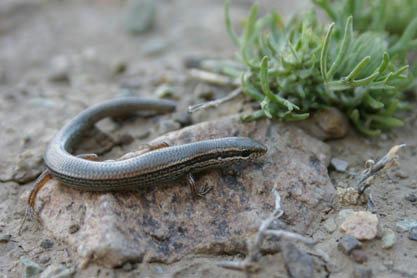

Conservation status
- Least Concern (IUCN 3.1)

Scientific classification
- Kingdom: Animalia
- Phylum: Chordata
- Class: Reptilia
- Order: Squamata
- Family: Scincidae
- Genus: Ablepharus
- Species: A. pannonicus

Binomial name
- Ablepharus pannonicus (Fitzinger, 1824)

Synonyms
- Ablepharus brandti; Ablepharus festae; Ablepharus pusillus; Blepharosteres agilis; Scincus pannonicus

= Asian snake-eyed skink =

Species of lizard

The Asian snake-eyed skink (Ablepharus pannonicus) is a species of skink. It is found in Georgia, southern Turkmenistan, southern Tajikistan, Uzbekistan, Kyrgyzstan, western Azerbaijan, eastern Iran, Iraq, Oman, Afghanistan, Pakistan, Jordan, Syria, the United Arab Emirates, northwestern India, and Cyprus.
