= Nartanasala =

Nartanasala (lit. 'dance theatre') may refer to:

- Nartanasala (1963 film), an Indian Telugu-language Hindu mythological film
- Nartanasala (2018 film), an Indian Telugu-language romantic comedy film

== See also ==
- Mahabharata (disambiguation)
