= Ablepharus sikimmensis =

Conservation status
- Least Concern (IUCN 3.1)

Scientific classification
- Kingdom: Animalia
- Phylum: Chordata
- Class: Reptilia
- Order: Squamata
- Family: Scincidae
- Genus: Ablepharus
- Species: A. sikimmensis

Binomial name
- Ablepharus sikimmensis (Blyth, 1854)

Synonyms
- Scincella sikimmensis

Species of lizard

Ablepharus sikimmensis (common name: Sikkim ground skink or bronzy-brown skink) is a species of skink found in Bangladesh (Rangpur), Bhutan, China (Tibet), India (Darjeeling, Sikkim) and Nepal.
