= Ramayana (Rajagopalachari book) =

Book by C. Rajagopalachari

- First edition
- Author: C. Rajagopalachari
- Genre: Mythology
- Publisher: Bharatiya Vidya Bhavan
- Publication date: 1957
- Publication place: India
- Media type: Print
- ISBN: 978-81-7276-365-7
- OCLC: 19243018

Ramayana is a retelling of the epic by C. Rajagopalachari. It was first published by Bharatiya Vidya Bhavan in 1957. This book is an abridged English retelling of the Valmiki Ramayana; he had earlier published a version of Kamba Ramayanam. Rajaji considered this book and his Mahabharata to be his greatest service to his countrymen.

As of 2001, the book had sold over a million copies.
