= Minor snake-eyed skink =

Conservation status
- Least Concern (IUCN 3.1)

Scientific classification
- Kingdom: Animalia
- Phylum: Chordata
- Class: Reptilia
- Order: Squamata
- Family: Scincidae
- Genus: Ablepharus
- Species: A. grayanus

Binomial name
- Ablepharus grayanus (Stoliczka, 1872)

Synonyms
- Blepharosteres grayanus Stoliczka, 1872; Ablepharus grayanus — Boulenger, 1887

Species of lizard

The minor snake-eyed skink (Ablepharus grayanus) is a species of lizard in the family Scincidae. The species is native to Asia.

== Geographic range ==
A. grayanaus can be found in Afghanistan, western India, Iran, and Pakistan.

== Habitat ==
A. grayanus is found in a variety of habitats including desert, rocky areas, grassland, freshwater wetlands, gardens, and houses, and has been found at altitudes as high as 2,000 m (6,600 ft).

== Description ==
A. grayanus may attain a snout-to-vent length (SVL) of 3.0 cm (1.2 in), plus a tail length of 5.5 cm (2.2 in). It has no external ear openings. There are 18 or 20 scale rows at midbody.

== Behavior ==
A. grayanus is diurnal and terrestrial.

== Reproduction ==
A. grayanus is oviparous. Eggs are laid in spring, and clutch size is one to two eggs.

== Etymology ==
The specific name, grayanus, is in honor of British herpetologist John Edward Gray.
