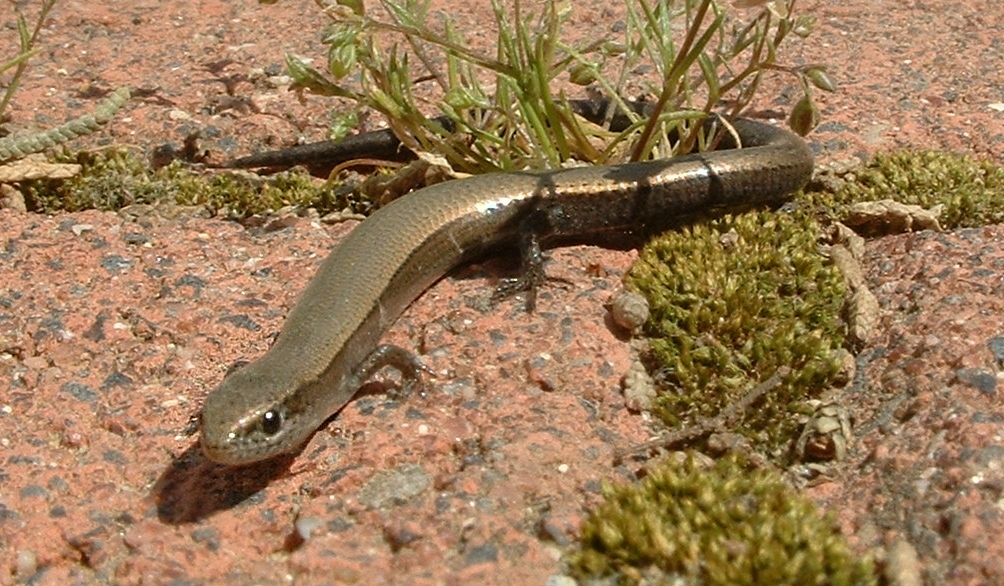
- European snake-eyed skink, Ablepharus kitaibelii

Scientific classification
- Domain: Eukaryota
- Kingdom: Animalia
- Phylum: Chordata
- Class: Reptilia
- Order: Squamata
- Family: Scincidae
- Subfamily: Eugongylinae
- Genus: Ablepharus; Lichtenstein, 1823

Species
- Ablepharus alaicus Ablepharus anatolicus Ablepharus bivittatus Ablepharus budaki Ablepharus chernovi Ablepharus darvazi Ablepharus deserti Ablepharus eremchenkoi Ablepharus grayanus Ablepharus himalayanus Ablepharus kitaibelii Ablepharus ladacensis Ablepharus lindbergi Ablepharus mahabharatus Ablepharus nepalensis Ablepharus pannonicus Ablepharus rueppellii Ablepharus sikimmensis Ablepharus tragbulensis

= Ablepharus =

Genus of lizards

Ablepharus is a genus of skinks that contains the common snake-eyed skinks. Both their scientific and common names refer to the fact that their eyelids have fused to a translucent capsule; as in snakes, they thus are physically incapable of blinking. They are small lizards and prefer to live in the leaf litter of dry fields and hills. Their scales give them a very shiny, bronze appearance with a characteristically dark stripe down the sides of their bodies. They prey on small insects and other small mollusks.

== Characteristics ==
=== Appearance ===
The scales on all Ablepharus species are shiny and bronze in appearance. Also, a very characteristic bronze stripe runs the length of the dorsal surface of the body. They have short, weak front legs, which contribute to their moving in a serpentine-like manner. In general, females are longer and weigh more than their male counterparts. Ablepharus species have thick tails relative to their body sizes and lengths. Fully mature Ablepharus species can reach a total length (including tail) of up to 15 cm (5.9 in). On average, both males and females reach a total length of up to about 13 cm (5.1 in).

=== Mannerisms and habitat ===
As a whole, Ablepharus skinks are generally shy creatures. They tend to bask in the sunlight during the daytime and become more active as dusk and darkness approach. They make their homes in rocky areas with leaf litter and little soil.

=== Distribution ===
The geographic range of the common snake-eyed skink spans from southern European countries to northern African countries; also, some species are native to southeast Asia. While most of the species in the genus prefer remaining low to the ground and in drier environments, some species may be found in damper habitats up to 2,000 m above sea level.

=== Diet ===
Analysis of the stomach contents of certain Ablepharus species has led to the conclusion that common snake-eyed skinks are typically generalist predators. They mainly feed on small arthropods, mollusks, and small snails.

=== Lifecycle ===
In captivity, common snake-eyed skinks are known to survive up to three and a half years; in the wild, where they are preyed upon, they live about two and a half years. Upon reaching reproductive maturity, the female snake-eyed skink lays between two and four eggs at a time; these eggs will then take at least 9 weeks to hatch. Hatchlings typically measure around 3.5 cm long. About two years are needed for the hatchlings to reach reproductive maturity.

== Species ==
There are 19 species in the genus Ablepharus which are recognized as being valid:

- A. alaicus (Elpatjevsky, 1901)

Found in China, Kyrgyzstan, Uzbekistan, Tajikistan, and Kazakhstan

- A. bivittatus (Ménétries, 1832) — twin-striped skink

Found in Azerbaijan, Turkey, south-eastern and central Armenia, Iran, and Turkmenistan
Typically found in thorny shrubbery, grasslands, and rocky slopes

- A. budaki Göçmen, Kumlutaş & Tosunoğlu, 1996 — Budak's snake-eyed skink

Found in Turkey, Syria, Lebanon, and Cyprus
Typically inhabits leaf litter, woodlands, shrubbery, and forests in humid areas

- A. chernovi Darevsky, 1953 — Chernov's skink

Found in Syria, Turkey, and Armenia
Typically, they are found hiding under leaf litter and small stones in open areas with little shrubbery or forestation. Some may also be found on some of the gentler slopes on some mountain ranges.

- A. darvazi Eremchenko & Panfilov, 1990 — Darvaz Range skink

Found in Tajikistan, India, Afghanistan, and Pakistan

- A. deserti Strauch, 1868 — desert lidless skink

Found in Turkmenistan, Kazakhstan, Uzbekistan, Tajikistan, and Kyrgyzstan
Generally observed in desert lands and dry slopes with several different types of angiosperms around 2,000 m above sea level

- A. eremchenkoi (Panfilov, 1999)

Found in Kyrgyzstan and Kazakhstan

- A. grayanus (Stoliczka, 1872) — minor snake-eyed skink

Found in Pakistan, India, Nepal, and Turkmenistan

- A. himalayanus (Günther, 1864)

Found in Kyrgyzstan and Kazakhstan, Pakistan, India, Nepal

- A. kitaibelii (Bibron & Bory de Saint-Vincent, 1833)— European snake-eyed skink

Found in southern Slovakia, Serbia, Hungary, Eastern Croatia, Albania, Greece, southern Romania, Macedonia, and Turkey
Inhabits arid regions containing meadows, scrubland, and woodland clearings, as well as hilly areas

- A. ladacensis (Günther, 1864)

Found in Tibet (China), North India, western Nepal, and northern Pakistan.

- A. lindbergi Wettstein, 1960 — Lindberg’s snake-eyed skink (sometimes A. bivittatus lindbergi )

Found in western Afghanistan

- A. mahabharatus Eremchenko, Shah & Panfilov, 1998

Found in Nepal.

- A. nepalensis Eremchenko & Helfenberger, 1998

Found in Nepal.

- A. pannonicus (Fitzinger, 1824) — Asian snake-eyed skink

Found in the United Arab Emirates, eastern Georgia, Iraq, Iran, Oman, Pakistan, Syria, Jordan, Afghanistan, Caucasus, northwestern India, southwestern Tajikistan, southern Turkmenistan, Kyrgyzstan, Uzbekistan, and western Azerbaijan

- A. rueppellii (Gray, 1839) — Rüppell's snake-eyed skink

Found in central and northern Israel, the Sinai Peninsula of Egypt, southern Lebanon, western and northern Jordan, and possible reported sightings in Syria and Jordan
Inhabits more heavily forested areas with dense vegetation, prefer humid areas, especially the oases in Egypt

- A. sikimmensis (Blyth, 1854)<

Found in Bangladesh (Rangpur), Bhutan, China (Tibet), India (Darjeeling, Sikkim) and Nepal.

- A. tragbulensis (Alcock, 1898)<

Found in India and Pakistan.

Nota bene: A binomial authority in parentheses indicates that the species was originally described in a genus other than Ablepharus.
