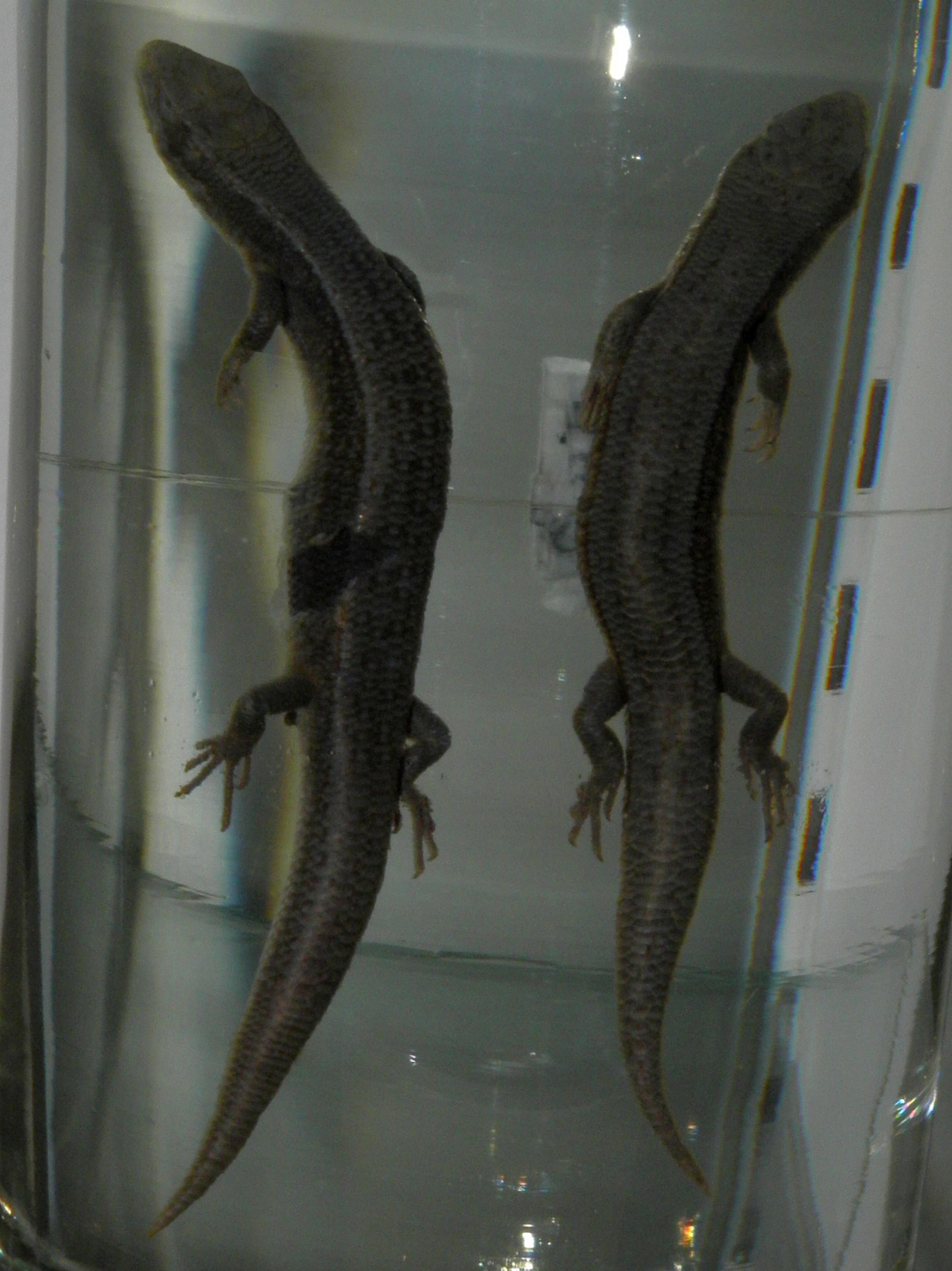

Conservation status
- Least Concern (IUCN 3.1)

Scientific classification
- Kingdom: Animalia
- Phylum: Chordata
- Class: Reptilia
- Order: Squamata
- Suborder: Scinciformata
- Infraorder: Scincomorpha
- Family: Eugongylidae
- Genus: Ablepharus
- Species: A. alaicus

Binomial name
- Ablepharus alaicus (Elpatjevsky, 1901)

= Ablepharus alaicus =

Species of lizard

Ablepharus alaicus (Chinese: 阿赖山泛蜥) is a species of skink found in China, Kyrgyzstan, Uzbekistan, Tajikistan, and Kazakhstan. It has a small, slender body, and was recently described by a team of researchers from Xinjiang Agricultural University.

== Description ==
A. alaicus was previously described as Asymblepharus alaicus, but was later moved to the Ablepharus genus. It was first found in northwest China, but historical records of its discovery were not confirmed. Several specimens were found in Kazakhstan in the late 19th to early 20th century, but they were not considered widespread in that country until later years. In 2023, a team of biologists collected specimens of the skinks from several areas within Xinjiang, which were then transported to Xinjiang Agricultural University for further research. The specimens' tissues were examined and various features of their bodies were measured, which confirmed some of the specimens as part of A. alaicus.

The species investigated at the university had an average body mass of 2.93 grams (0.103 oz) and a snout–vent length of 60.4 millimetres (2.38 in). The skink's body is slender, with a body weight to snout–vent length ratio of 0.17, and its width remains consistent throughout its length. Its tail has a tail base width of 5.2 millimetres (0.20 in). Its head is small but long, with the head's length, width, and depth at 11.97 millimetres (0.471 in), 7.28 millimetres (0.287 in), and 6.5 millimetres (0.26 in), respectively. Length-wise, the forelimbs of the specimens measured 12.53 millimetres (0.493 in), and the hindlimbs measured 16.45 millimetres (0.648 in).

== Subspecies ==
- Ablepharus Ablepharus alaicus
- Ablepharus Ablepharus kucenkoi
- Ablepharus Ablepharus yakovlevae
