= Ablepharus tragbulensis =

Conservation status
- Data Deficient (IUCN 3.1)

Scientific classification
- Kingdom: Animalia
- Phylum: Chordata
- Class: Reptilia
- Order: Squamata
- Suborder: Scinciformata
- Infraorder: Scincomorpha
- Family: Eugongylidae
- Genus: Ablepharus
- Species: A. tragbulensis

Binomial name
- Ablepharus tragbulensis (Alcock, 1898)

Species of lizard

Ablepharus tragbulensis is a species of skink endemic to South Asia.

== Geographic range ==
A. tragbulensis is found in India, and possibly Pakistan.

Type locality: "Tragbal [sic] Pass, at an elevation of about 9,000 feet". [= Tragbul Pass (34° 29' N, 74° 40' E), about 50 km (31 mi) NNW of Srinagar, Kashmir, India and Pakistan, 9,000 ft (2,700 m)].
