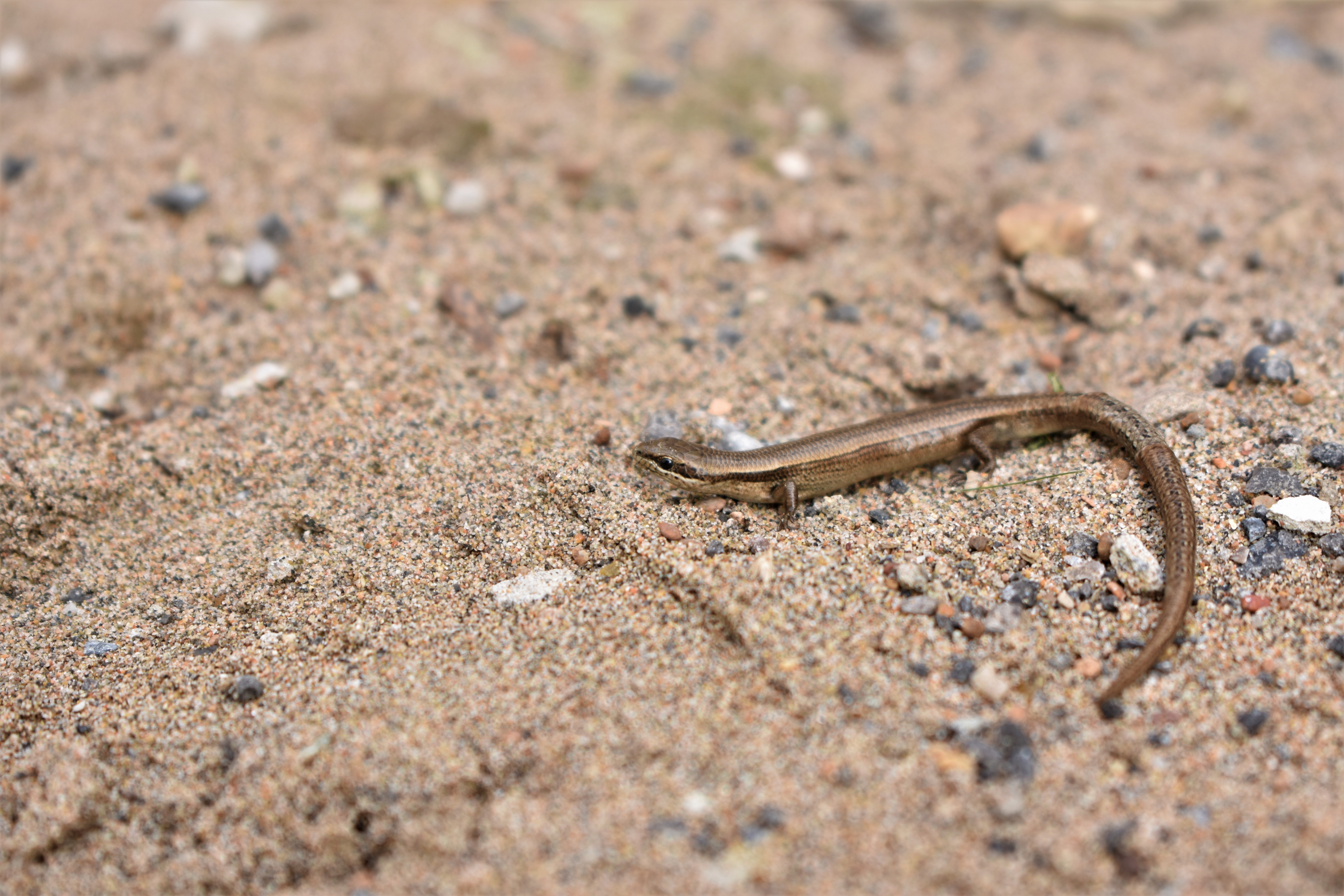

Conservation status
- Least Concern (IUCN 3.1)

Scientific classification
- Kingdom: Animalia
- Phylum: Chordata
- Class: Reptilia
- Order: Squamata
- Suborder: Scinciformata
- Infraorder: Scincomorpha
- Family: Eugongylidae
- Genus: Ablepharus
- Species: A. deserti

Binomial name
- Ablepharus deserti Strauch, 1868
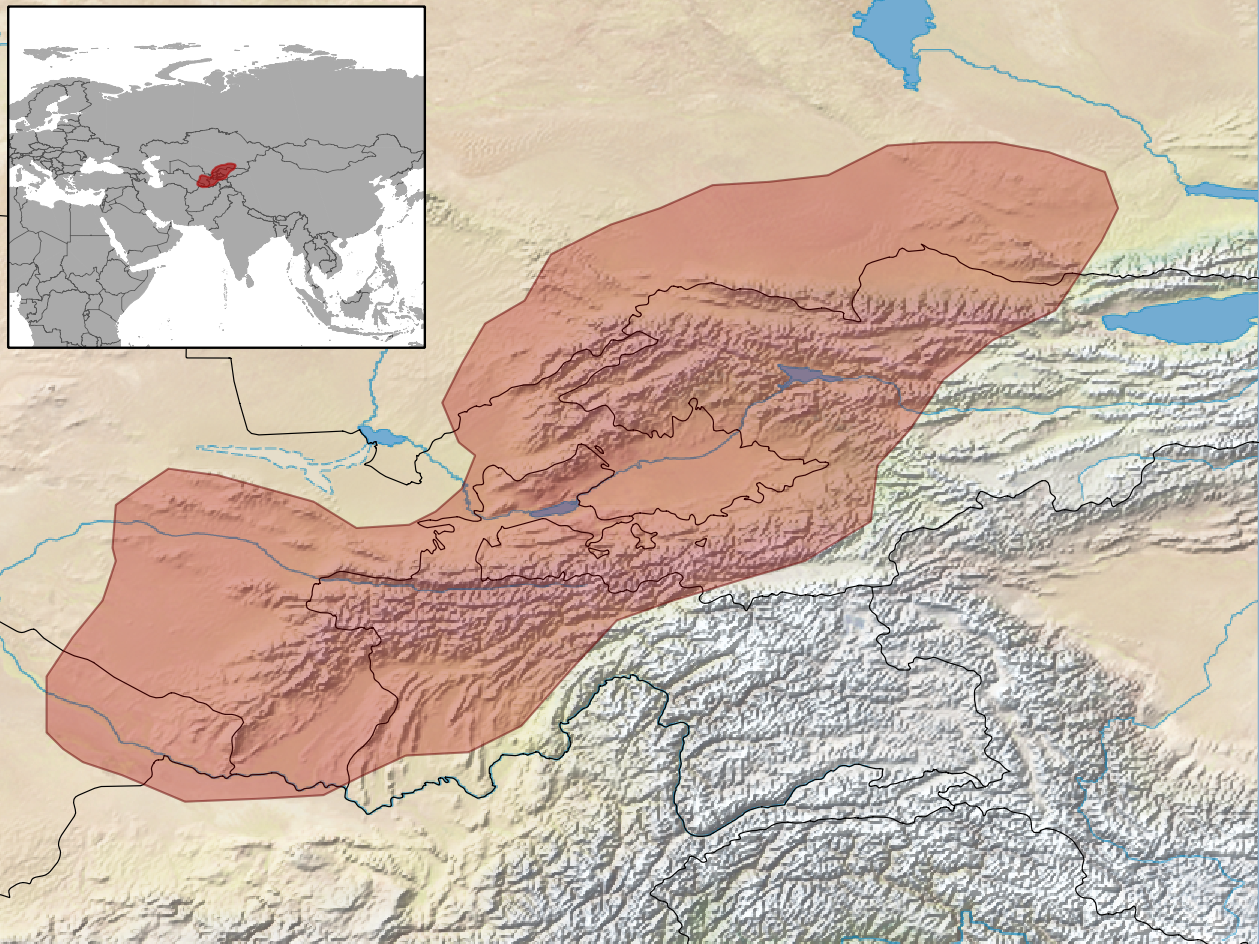

Synonyms
- Ablepharus tenuis; Ablepharus turkestanicus

= Desert lidless skink =

Species of lizard

The desert lidless skink (Ablepharus deserti) is a species of skink native to southern Kazakhstan, Kyrgyzstan, northern Tajikistan, Uzbekistan and eastern Turkmenistan.
