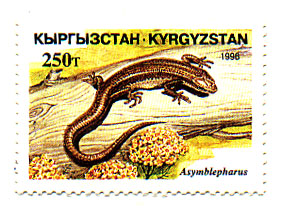

Conservation status
- Least Concern (IUCN 3.1)

Scientific classification
- Kingdom: Animalia
- Phylum: Chordata
- Class: Reptilia
- Order: Squamata
- Family: Scincidae
- Genus: Ablepharus
- Species: A. eremchenkoi

Binomial name
- Ablepharus eremchenkoi (Panfilov, 1999)

Synonyms
- Asymblepharus eremchenkoi Panfilov, 1999; Ablepharus eremchenkoi — Mirza et al., 2022

= Ablepharus eremchenkoi =

Species of lizard

Ablepharus eremchenkoi is a species of skink, a lizard in the family Scincidae. The species is native to Kazakhstan and Kyrgyzstan.

== Etymology ==
The specific name, eremchenkoi, is in honor of Russian herpetologist Valery Konstantinovich Eremchenko (also published as Jeremčenko).

== Geographic range ==
A. eremchenkoi is found in southern Kazakhstan and northwestern Kyrgyzstan.

== Habitat ==
The preferred natural habitat of A. eremchenkoi is rocky areas, at altitudes of 2,500–3,300 m (8,200–10,800 ft).
