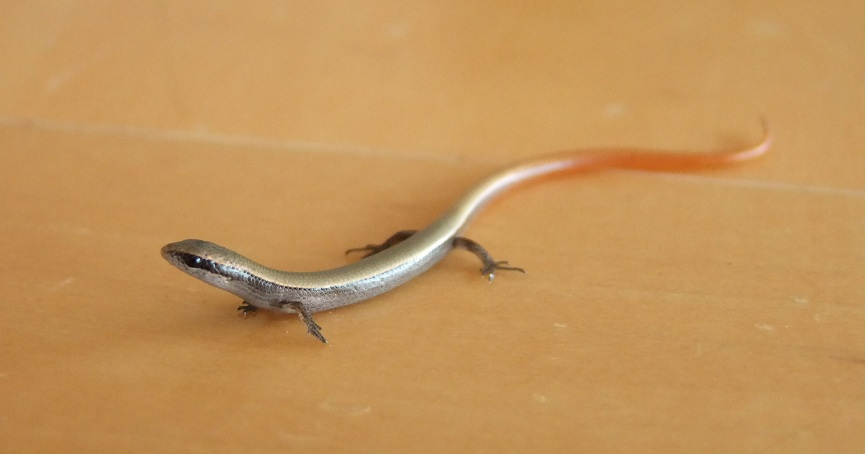

Conservation status
- Least Concern (IUCN 3.1)

Scientific classification
- Kingdom: Animalia
- Phylum: Chordata
- Class: Reptilia
- Order: Squamata
- Family: Scincidae
- Genus: Ablepharus
- Species: A. rueppellii

Binomial name
- Ablepharus rueppellii Gray, 1839
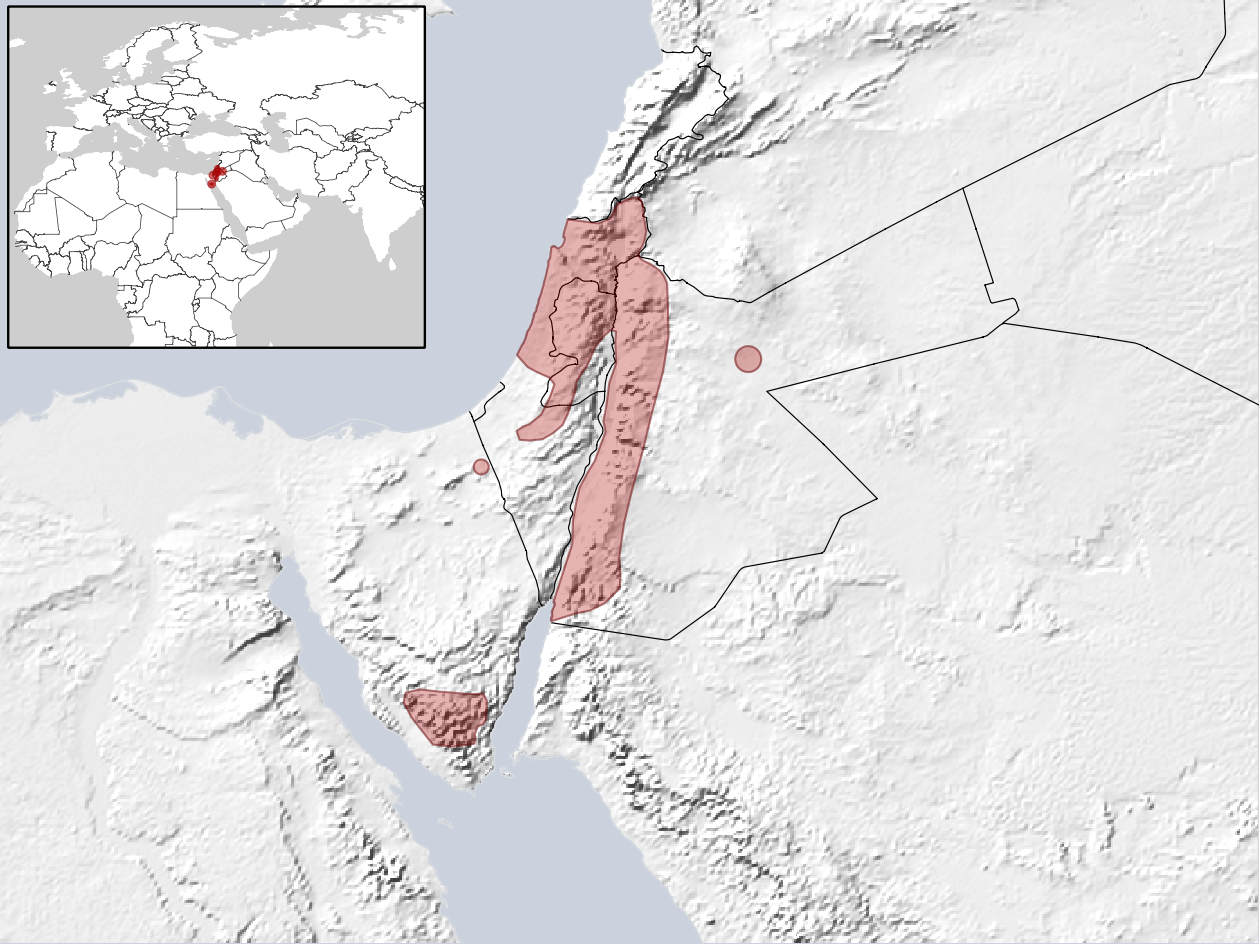

= Ablepharus rueppellii =

Rüppell's snake-eyed skink

Species of lizard

Ablepharus rueppellii, known commonly as Rüppell's snake-eyed skink, is a species of skink found in the Middle East. It was formerly considered a subspecies of Ablepharus kitaibelii, but has since been distinguished. What is currently recognized as this species is possibly two distinct species.

== Range ==
It is found throughout north and central Israel, Lebanon, western Jordan, and the Sinai Peninsula of Egypt. It also possibly lives in Syria, though this is also unconfirmed. In the areas where it can be found, it is generally uncommon. It is found in the leaf litter of forested or shrubby areas, and in Egypt, it is usually found near oases. It is highly localized in densely vegetated areas.

In Israel, the species is common and can be found in cities. It is one of the few reptiles capable of living in areas afforested with Aleppo pine (these are very widespread in Israel).

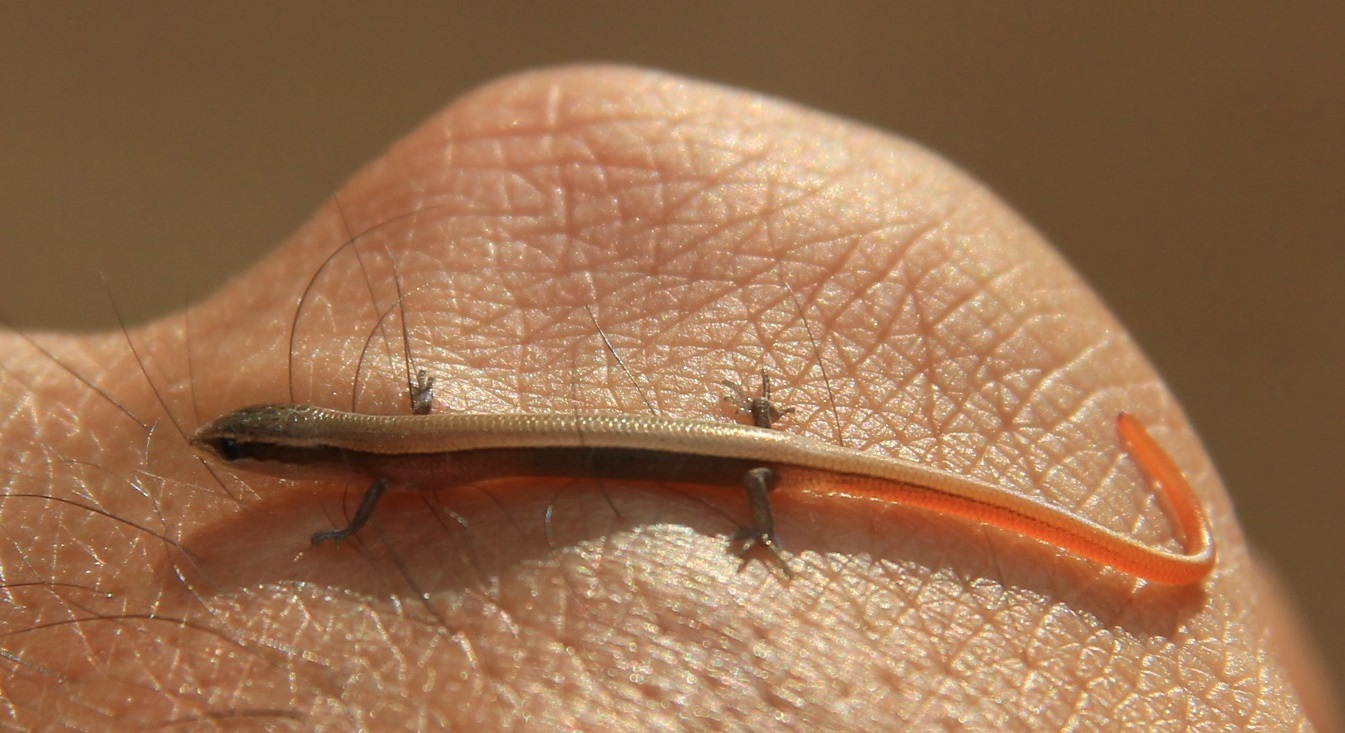
Rüppell's snake-eyed skink (young), Judaean Mountains 2014

== Possible threats ==
Few threats exist to the species as a whole, though deforestation and loss of traditionally farmed orchards may affect specific populations. The species is protected by legislation in Israel.
