= Mahabharata (Rajagopalachari book) =

- First edition
- Author: C. Rajagopalachari
- Language: English
- Genre: Theology
- Publisher: Bharatiya Vidya Bhavan
- Publication date: 1958
- Publication place: India
- Media type: Print
- ISBN: 978-81-7276-368-8
- OCLC: 48972632

Mahabharata is a historical book retold by C. Rajagopalachari. It was first published by Bharatiya Vidya Bhavan in 1958. This book is an abridged English retelling of Vyasa's Mahabharata. Rajaji considered this book and his Ramayana to be his greatest service to his countrymen.

As of 2001, the book had sold over a million copies.
