= The Mahabharata Secret =

2013 novel by Christopher C. Doyle

- Author: Christopher C. Doyle
- Cover artist: Ritu Rathour; Anand Prakash
- Language: English
- Genre: Fiction
- Publisher: Om Books
- Publication date: 21 October 2013
- Publication place: India
- Media type: Paperback; Kindle
- Pages: 386
- ISBN: 9-789383-202317

The Mahabharata Secret is the debut novel by Indian author Christopher C. Doyle and was released on 21 October 2013 by Om Books. The story follows Vijay and his friends, as they try to decipher a series of clues which would lead them to a devastating Secret hidden by a brotherhood known as the Nine Men. Doyle had initially started writing a story for his daughter, which gradually expanded into the book. The author was primarily inspired by the Indian epic Mahabharata, believing its events to be based on scientific facts. The book was followed by Doyle's second novel, The Mahabharata Quest: The Alexander Secret, which is the first book in a planned trilogy of sequels.

Doyle believes in the possibility of the existence of a secret history which was probably not recorded in antiquity. While researching he also came across legends prevalent about King Ashoka and linked the story with him. Following its release, The Mahabharata Secret was a commercial success, which enabled the author to get signed for further thriller novels based on the subject matter and was also nominated for the 2014 Crossword Book Award.

== Plot synopsis ==
In 244 BC, Indian emperor Ashoka finds a hilly cave with an astonishing secret. Believing it could destroy the world, he creates a secret brotherhood of Nine Men, who would guard the cave's contents through the centuries. He also removed the Vimana Parva chapter of the Indian epic, Mahabharata, from its written transcripts.

In present day, Vikram Singh, an Indian nuclear scientist, is murdered at his fort in Jaungarh. Before his death he sent four cryptic emails to his nephew Vijay, who with his business partner Colin, childhood friend Radha and her father, linguist Dr. Shukla, start analyzing it. They are aided by Bheem Singh, current owner of Rajvirgarh fort and Greg White, an archaeologist mentioned in Vikram's emails. The group deduce that the emails refer to the Nine Men and their secret, which can be revealed by using a metal disc, a key, a ball of rock and a riddle. Their mission is interrupted by a man called Farooq, a Lashkar-e-Taiba (LeT) militant. The group find that the metal disc and the key together point to the Edicts of Ashoka. They travel to Bairat and find a hidden library of the Nine, but are imprisoned inside by Farooq and his men. The group find an alternate route and the ball of rock.

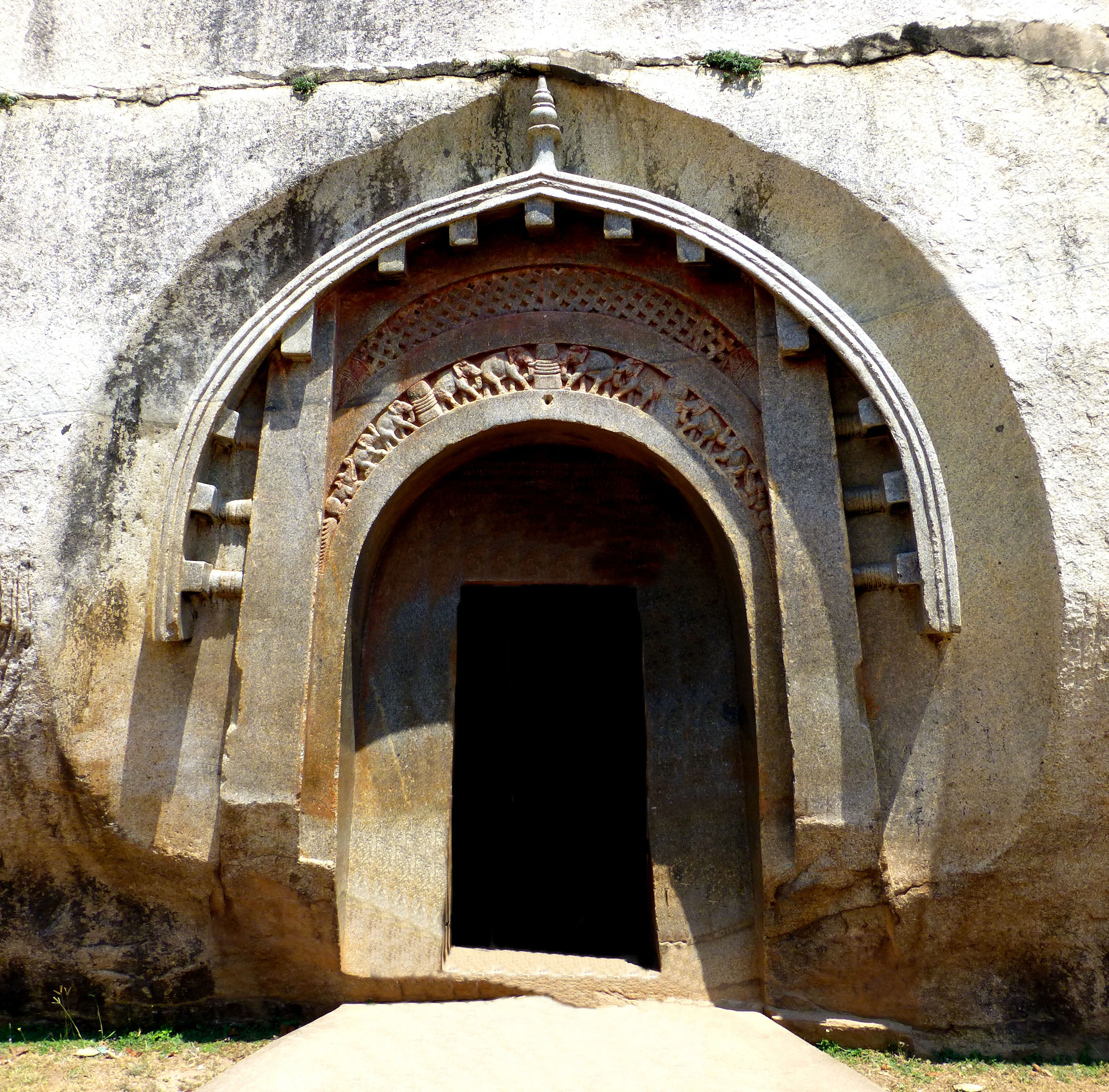
The Barabar Caves, location of the second inscribed ball.

In the meantime, Intelligence Bureau (IB) official Imran Kidwai gets information about Farooq and starts investigating. Vijay and his friends travel to the Barabar Caves in Bihar after interpreting a clue in Bairat. Inside the caves they unearth another such ball with inscriptions on it. However, Vijay and Radha are kidnapped by Farooq. Imran suspects Bheem Singh and investigates in his basement, but gets caught. Bheem explains that the Vimana Parva of the Mahabharata spoke about ancient arsenal which could be made invisible by covering them with an undisclosed element, thus making them fatal. This was what the Nine tried to protect. Imran understands that Bheem was allied with Farooq and were trying to discover the secret location of the weapons. In an ensuing conflict, Bheem's attack on Imran backfires and he himself is killed.

Farooq had given 48 hours time to Vijay's friends to decipher the meaning of the final clue in the ball. They unearth the final secret to be at Hazaribagh, atop a hill called Marang Buru. Farooq and his men escape with Vijay on being notified of Imran's advance, leaving Radha behind. As the whole group reaches Marang Buru, there it is revealed that Greg was actually an assassin employed by Farooq called Murphy, impersonating the real Greg White. On Farooq's insistence, Vijay and Colin enter the hill and through numerous chambers reach the secret vault of the Nine. There they discover the giant artillery, including the nuclear weapons. Farooq and his henchmen start collecting the weapons, unaware that Imran and Indian commandos had surrounded them. Colin, Shukla and Vijay are rescued and reunite with Radha, with Imran driving them away from Hazaribagh. A mistimed grenade blasts the secret cavern, destroying the hillside and killing off Farooq and the others, thereby wiping out the Nine's secret.

A few days later, Vijay re-reads his uncle's e-mails and finds another clue, directing him to the vicinity of Jaungarh fort. There he finds a secret chamber containing the documents belonging to the Nine, as well as important texts, scriptures and ancient artifacts. A letter from his uncle reveals him as the last member of the Nine, and a request for Vijay to accept the guardianship of the documents. Vijay accepts and becomes a member of the Nine Men.

== Development ==
Author Christopher C. Doyle had studied Business Management from Indian Institute of Management Calcutta and runs a firm for training CEO and CXOs. However, he always had a childhood weakness for fantasy novels, being inspired by authors like Jules Verne, H. G. Wells, J. R. R. Tolkien as well as Robert Jordan. One day he started writing a novel for his daughter, who was interested in stories based on fantasy and science. However, as she grew older, she wanted a more mature story. It was then that Doyle decided to expand the story and write it into a full novel. He was inspired by a 1917 book he had read, The Hindu History by Akshay Majumdar, which wrote about an alternate history of India by combining legends and mythology. Doyle was also intrigued by the Indian epic Mahabharata which translated into "this is what happened". He thought about the basis of the epic in history and science and moved forward with his writing. Two other books contributed to his inspiration and research, Fingerprints of the Gods by Graham Hancock and Uriel's Machine by Christopher Knight and Robert Lomas. His reading led him to the conclusion that the Mahabharata might be true, and he stated that:

And if the Mahabharata was true, then it was possible that some of the fantastic events described in the Mahabharata could have a scientific base as well, which no one has explored as of now. This fascinating thought lingered in my mind and propelled me to explore this aspect further. So that's really how history, mythology and science came together.

Doyle researched the legends surrounding King Ashoka, including those of the Nine Men, and Ashoka's alleged suppression of science. Doyle says he used such legends to develop a plot about the brotherhood of the Nine, setting it between 200 BC and 500 BC. Doyle visited The Asiatic Society in Kolkata to review material on Ashoka and emperor's edicts that are preserved there. Doyle stated that it took him two years to finalize and complete The Mahabharata Secret. According to Doyle, the fictional weapon in the book "used a totally different scientific concept which I had to build from scratch. The use of hard core science and accepted scientific fact to explain mythology was something that makes my books different".

== Release and reception ==
The Mahabharata Secret was released by Om Books on 21 October 2013. Following its release, the book was a commercial success, selling over 100,000 copies within two years. It was nominated for the 2014 Crossword Book Award with Vivek Tejuja of Scroll.in giving a positive feedback, comparing the novel with that of author Dan Brown's The Da Vinci Code (2003), and adding "A suspense thriller served with large helpings of history makes for a good in-flight read." Seeing the success of the book, Westland Publishers signed Doyle to write a thriller trilogy inspired by the Mahabharata. The Mahabharata Quest: The Alexander Secret, Doyle's second novel and the first in the planned trilogy, was released in October 2014.

== See also ==
- Ashokavadana
- Ashoka's Major Rock Edicts
- Bhagavad Gita
- Cloaking device
- The Emperor's Riddles
- Edicts of Ashoka
- Metamaterial cloaking
- Pillars of Ashoka
- The Nine Unknown
