= Ablepharus mahabharatus =

Conservation status
- Data Deficient (IUCN 3.1)

Scientific classification
- Kingdom: Animalia
- Phylum: Chordata
- Class: Reptilia
- Order: Squamata
- Suborder: Scinciformata
- Infraorder: Scincomorpha
- Family: Eugongylidae
- Genus: Ablepharus
- Species: A. mahabharatus

Binomial name
- Ablepharus mahabharatus Eremchenko, Shah, & Panfilov, 1998

Species of reptile

The Mahabharat ground skink (Ablepharus mahabharatus) is a species of skink found in Nepal.
