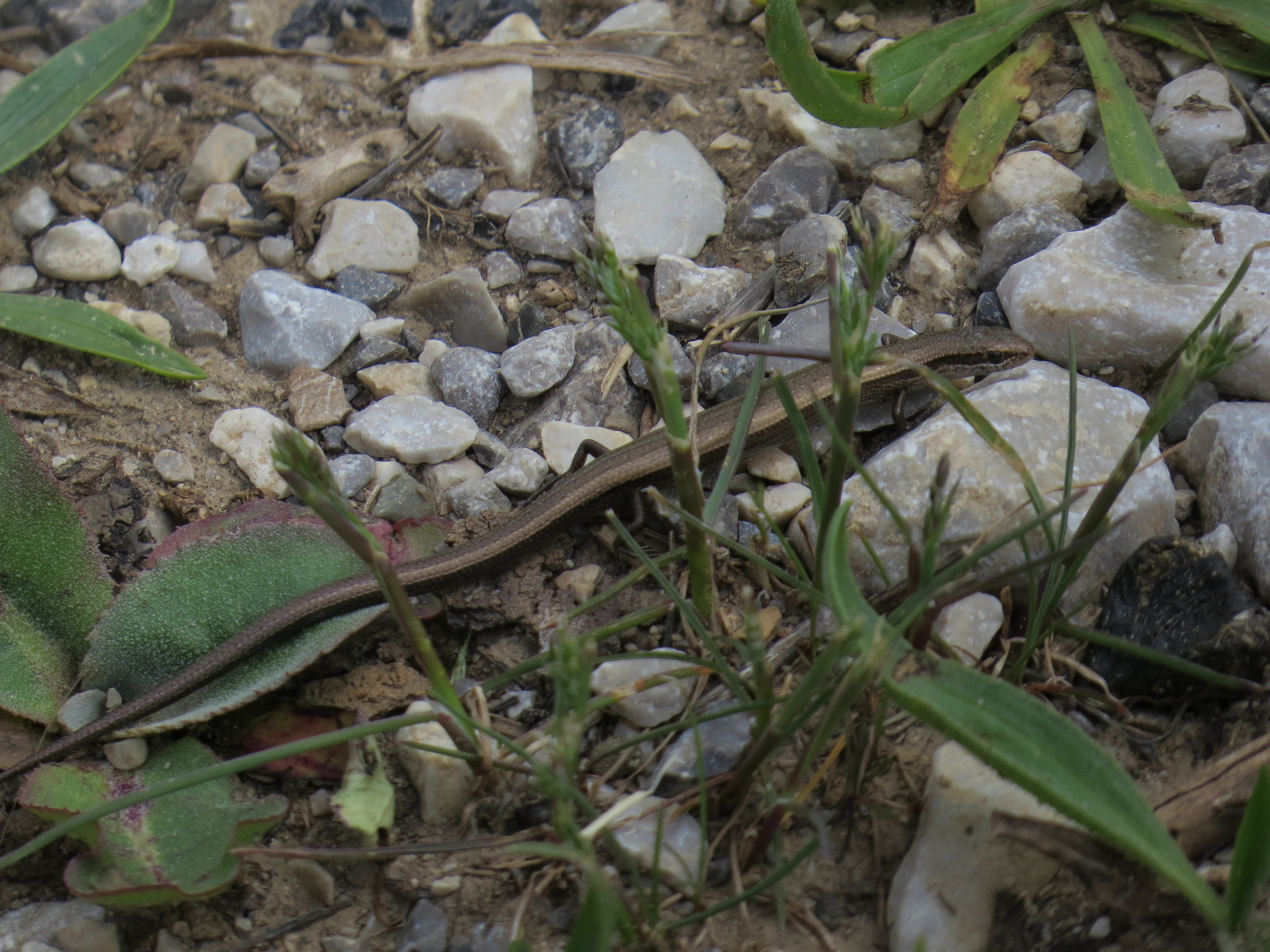

Conservation status
- Least Concern (IUCN 3.1)

Scientific classification
- Kingdom: Animalia
- Phylum: Chordata
- Class: Reptilia
- Order: Squamata
- Family: Scincidae
- Genus: Ablepharus
- Species: A. budaki

Binomial name
- Ablepharus budaki Göçmen, Kumlutaş & Tosunoglu, 1996

Synonyms
- Ablepharus kitaibelii budaki Göçmen, Kumlutas & Tosunoglu, 1996; Ablepharus budaki — J.F. Schmidtler, 1997

= Ablepharus budaki =

Species of lizard

Ablepharus budaki, commonly known as Budak's skink and Budak's snake-eyed skink, is a species of lizard in the family Scincidae. The species is endemic to the Near East.

== Taxonomy ==
A. budaki is a scincid saurian vertebrate. In 1997, it was promoted from its status as a subspecies of Ablepharus kitaibelii to full species status.

== Etymology ==
The specific name, budaki, is in honor of Turkish herpetologist Abidin Budak.

== Geographic range ==
A. budaki occurs in southern Turkey, western Syria, Cyprus, and Lebanon.

== Habitat ==
The preferred habitat of A. budaki is leaf litter of shrubby or forested areas.

== Reproduction ==
A. budaki is oviparous.

== Conservation status ==
A. budaki is common and has no major threats in most of its range, though in Lebanon it may face a threat from deforestation.
