= The Mahabharata Quest: The Alexander Secret =

2014 novel by Christopher C. Doyle

- Author: Christopher C. Doyle
- Cover artist: Ritu Rathour; Anand Prakash
- Language: English
- Series: The Mahabharata Series
- Genre: Fiction
- Publisher: Westland Books
- Publication date: 9 October 2014
- Publication place: India
- Media type: Paperback; Kindle
- Pages: 386
- ISBN: 978-93-84030-59-9
- Followed by: The Secret of the Druids

The Mahabharata Quest: The Alexander Secret is the second novel by Indian author Christopher C. Doyle and was released on 9 October 2014 by Westland Publishers. The story follows Vijay and his friends as they embark on a quest to learn about Alexander the Great's secret mission in India while encountering bioterrorism. Following his first novel, The Mahabharata Secret, Doyle was signed for a three book series by Westland. The author researched further on the Mahabharata and was also intrigued by Alexander's invasion of India and his sudden retreat. Doyle combined secrets from the epic and created the story, stating that he consulted Sanskrit scholars and science experts regarding the theories he put in the book. The Mahabharata Quest: The Alexander Secret was a commercial success and received positive critical reviews, which praised the storytelling and the theme.

== Plot synopsis ==
In 334 BC, Emperor Alexander the Great travels to India and discovers a secret with the aid of his general Eumenes; he dies prematurely and Eumenes removes the information of the secret from any historical records related to Alexander.

In present day, archaeologist Alice Turner and her team unearth the tomb of Olympias, mother of Alexander, and discover a small, mysterious cube there. However, her team are suddenly killed by mercenaries led by Peter Cooper, who blast off the tomb. Alice escapes to India to her ex-boyfriend Vijay's residence at Jaungarh fort. She details about her ordeal, and the group, consisting of Vijay, his friend Colin Baker, fiancée Radha, and her linguist father Dr. Shukla, listen to her and examine the cube. They find scripts on the six faces of the cube and try to decipher it.

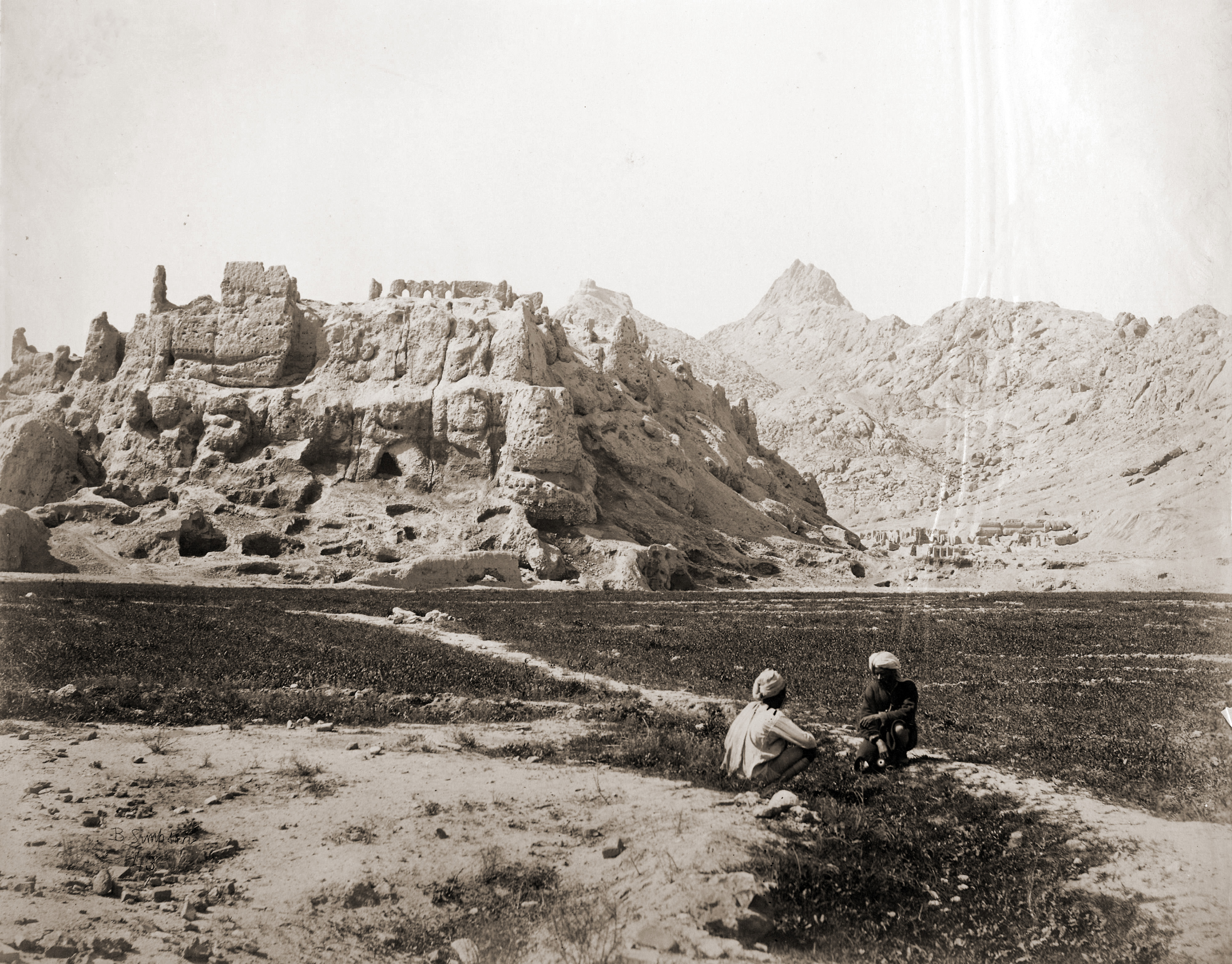
Ruins of old Kandahar region, set up by Alexander

In the meantime, Intelligence Bureau (IB) official Imran Kidwai discovers unexplained corpses in a recently burnt down lab. Further examination leads to doubts of bio-terrorism. Kidwai enlists the help of Vijay, Radha and Colin, who are part of a joint task force between the United States and India to combat terrorism. Together with Radha he goes to interview Dr. Saxena, CMO of Titan pharmaceuticals, owners of the lab. Kidwai is later ambushed in his home with an RPG and gets critically injured. Through a series of papers belonging to his parents, who were also archaeologists, Vijay and his friends deduce that the cube was related to Alexander's secret quest in the Kandahar region.

Vijay, Colin, Alice and Dr. Shukla go to a museum in Delhi to find out about an ancient metal plate, but are cornered by a group of assassins led by Riley. They kill Rajiv Sahu, the curator, but the group manages to escape. Meanwhile, Radha is kidnapped and is taken to a medical facility by Saxena. He explains to Radha that the facility, as well as the burnt down lab were lockups, where human testing of Alexander's secret was going on through the combination of retrovirus and bacterium. It holds the key to reduce ageing and provide guard against most known diseases, thus making one immortal. Radha secretly emails her location to IB and tries to escape, but is shot. Saxena flees with a critically injured Radha while wiping out all information so that the IB does not get any evidence.

Vijay gets a call from the kidnappers asking him to surrender the cube and solve the puzzle regarding Alexander's quest, in exchange of Radha. He decides to go with the kidnappers and solve it, with Colin, Alice and Dr. Shukla helping him from Jaungarh. He travels to Afghanistan where he meets the leader, Christian Van Kleuck, an Austrian businessman associated with an ancient group called The Order. Van Kleuck explains to him that the secret referred to the potion of immortality, which Alexander had found. The legend was present in the Mahabharata by the name of Samudra manthan or Churning of the Ocean of Milk, which according to the epic had given rise to Amrita, the nectar of immortality. Vijay understand that the order wants to find the ingredients in creating such a potion. The group starts on their quest to find the locations using the verses on the cube.

With help, Vijay guides Van Kleuck and his team to the Kunar Valley, where through a series of sentinels, they stumble upon an underground lake in a cave. The water was white in color, and there were ancient distillation and mixing equipment present. After taking sample from the lake, which consists of the bacterium, the group continues to the final stop, Ustyurt Plateau, between Uzbekistan and Kazakhstan. They reach a mountain formation called The Three Brothers, and climb the shortest of the three ridges. Inside a sealed chamber, the group find a number of vessels which had contained the churned Amrita. One chamber is full of snakes and Van Kleuck orders his men to take a pair of each, as they would be the virus needed in the potion. After finishing their job they lock Vijay inside, but are ambushed by the Kazakh Air force choppers and MiG-29s outside and escapes. Vijay is rescued and brought back to India.

In New Delhi, the group, along with Kidwai continue searching for the Order and Radha, although knowing she might be dead. One night, Vijay receives a mysterious phone call from a person claiming to be his father's ally, but promises to meet him with important information only after six months.

== Development ==
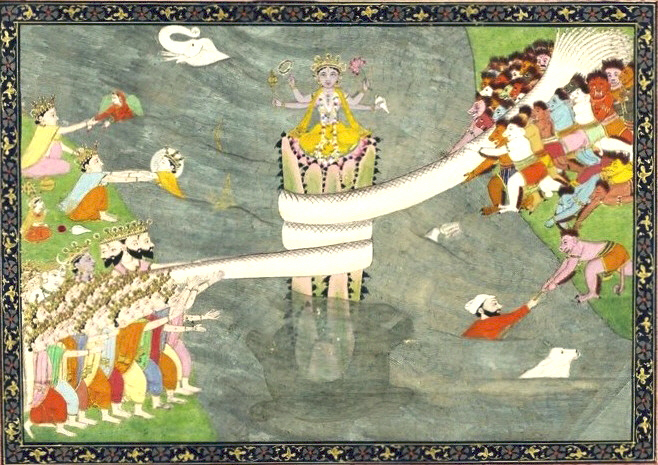
Samudra manthan was a primary idea behind the book's story

Doyle released his first novel, The Mahabharata Secret in 2013, calling it a story that he wrote for his daughter, which gradually expanded into a novel.

Doyle started researching more for the second book, utilizing the ideas he developed for the first one, reading the Mahabharata and a host of other research and books. When asked, The Mahabharata Quest: The Alexander Secret was described by Doyle as "a contemporary thriller which is an intriguing blend of history, science and mythology." He created a series with the story, titling it The Mahabharata Series, and brought back the same principal characters from the first book. However, Doyle explained that the book was not a sequel to The Mahabharata Secret, but a logical extension of it by combining the Mahabharata and Alexander's secrets. The author explained his views about utilizing Alexander's campaign of India in the story:

I could not accept the traditional explanation that his soldiers revolted at the banks of the Beas river saying they wanted to go back... For a man who had marched 20,000 miles in the quest of conquering the world would have ideally liked to conquer this territory as well. Instead he turned back mysteriously. So for me I saw this as a big gap and this is where I found the linkage in my book between the secret of the gods and Alexander's real purpose for visiting India.

Doyle researched the scientific reasons to support the secret that he spoke off in the book, including travelling to Dasuya, from where Alexander supposedly retreated. He believed that since Alexander had already proclaimed himself to be son of the Greek god Zeus, he might have already come across such a secret. The story was left with a cliffhanging sequence, with Doyle confirming that he would continue writing till the second half of 2015. In total, it took him two years to finalize and complete the book, and he based the story in science, and not on conspiracy theories or religion or mythical fantasy. Doyle has said that unlike the unexplained methods in conspiracy theories he used "cutting edge" scientific discoveries of the last decade to substantiate the secret of Samudra manthan in the book, including consulting with scientific experts who said the explanation seemed plausible. "So I used a totally different scientific concept which I had to build from scratch. The use of hard core science and accepted scientific fact to explain mythology was something that makes my books different," he added. Finally, Doyle consulted with Sanskrit language scholars to interpret the shlokas he used in the book and completing it.

== Release and aftermath ==
The book was released on 9 October 2014 by Westland. Following its release, The Mahabharata Quest: The Alexander Secret sold 15,000 copies within a month. Sangeeta Barooah Pisharoty from The Hindu believed that with the book, Doyle was "all set to establish [himself] as a fantasy writer who looks at legends and mythology through the tunnel of science, from the convenience of the modern-day world." Nupur Gosai from Aaj Tak also gave a positive review, saying that "Doyle puts up a good image of the archaeology and the ancient history in front of the 'selfie-freak' generation, although they might find it difficult to grasp all the concepts... The best part about the book is its pace and the storytelling which will keep readers engrossed continuously." Arunava Sinha from Scroll.in listed the book as one of the year's top selling mythological inspired books in India, saying that "book-buyers are still keen to have their traditional myths packaged into racy tales, and the more they can combine historical characters and different epochs of time, the better. Hence the success of [the book]". A writer for Verve magazine agreed with the previous review, adding that the book "will surely appeal to fans of mystery books".

The paperback version of the book sold around 50,000 copies making it a commercial success. In October 2015, Doyle launched an online club called The Quest Club, and released a mini-sequel to The Alexander Secret as an e-book for free. The popularity of the e-book deluged the author with requests to publish the sequel as a paperback. He ultimately gave in, and the mini-sequel was published in print in March 2016. Known as A Secret Revealed, the mini-sequel deals with what happened when Vijay finally met the mysterious caller six months later at a Starbucks shop in Gurgaon, India.

== See also ==
- Bacteriophage
- Phage therapy
- Kshir Sagar
- Reverse transcriptase
- Indian campaign of Alexander the Great
- Death of Alexander the Great
- Alexander the Great in legend
