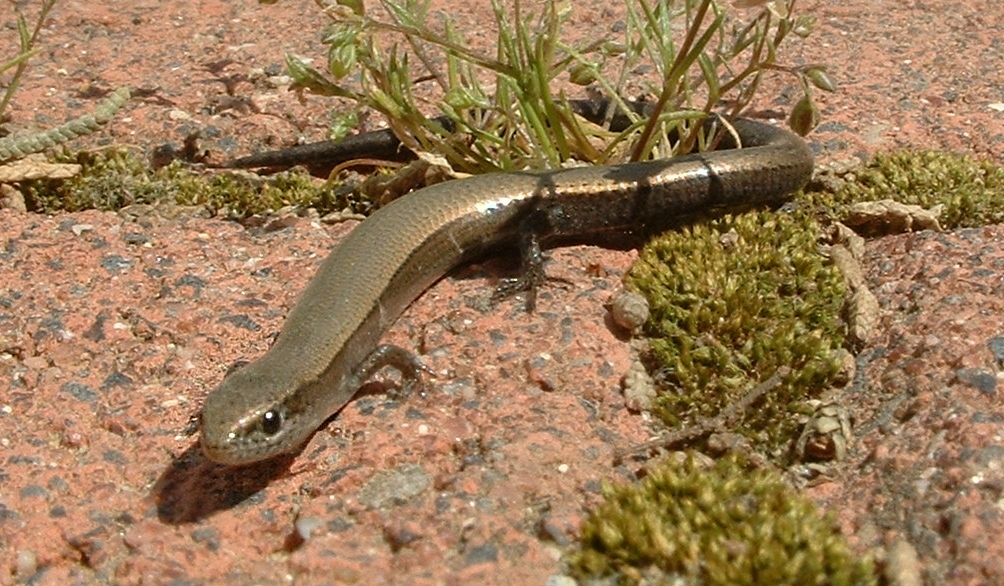

Conservation status
- Least Concern (IUCN 3.1)

Scientific classification
- Kingdom: Animalia
- Phylum: Chordata
- Class: Reptilia
- Order: Squamata
- Family: Scincidae
- Genus: Ablepharus
- Species: A. kitaibelii

Binomial name
- Ablepharus kitaibelii (Bibron & Bory de Saint-Vincent, 1833)

Subspecies
- A. k. kitaibelii (Bibron & Bory de Saint-Vincent, 1833); A. k. fabichi Štěpánek, 1938; A. k. fitzingeri Mertens, 1952; A. k. stepaneki Fuhn, 1970

Synonyms
- Ablepharis [sic] kitaibelii Bibron & Bory de Saint-Vincent, 1833; Ablepharus kitaibelii — A.M.C. Duméril & Bibron, 1839

= Ablepharus kitaibelii =

Species of lizard

Ablepharus kitaibelii, also known commonly as the European copper skink, the European snake-eyed skink, the juniper skink, and the snake-eyed skink, is a species of skink, a lizard in the subfamily Eugongylinae of the family Scincidae. The species is native to Eastern Europe and Southwestern Asia.

== Geographic range ==
A. kitaibelii is native to Greece (including the Aegean Islands), Romania, Bulgaria, the former Yugoslavia, Hungary, Albania, Slovakia, the Caucasus, Turkey, Syria, Israel, Jordan, Lebanon, the Sinai Peninsula of Egypt and possibly Iraq. The subspecies A. k. fitzingeri is known from Slovakia, Hungary, Greece and the island of Corfu. The subspecies A. k. stepaneki is known from Bulgaria and Romania. Also Macedonia

== Description ==
A small, slender lizard, A. kitaibelii grows up to 15 cm (5.9 in) in total length (including tail). The skin is bronze-coloured, with dark sides. The eyelids are immovable, in contrast to many other skinks.

== Habitat and behaviour ==
A. kitaibelii is a shy species, which lives under stones and leaves in dry places, such as south slopes, fields, and meadows. It is active during twilight, and hunts for insects and small snails. It is a typical ground dweller, and dislikes climbing.

== Reproduction ==
A. kitabelii is oviparous.

== Taxonomy ==
Many former subspecies of Ablepharus kitaibelii have been promoted to categorization as species, such as Ablepharus rueppellii and Ablepharus budaki.

== Etymology ==
The specific name, kitaibelii, is in honor of Hungarian botanist Paul Kitaibel.
