= The Mahābhārata (Smith book) =

2009 abridged translation of the Hindu epic Mahabharata by John D. Smith

- Author: John D. Smith (Translator)
- Language: English
- Genre: Mythology, Epic poetry
- Publisher: Penguin Classics
- Publication date: 2009
- Media type: Print (Paperback/Hardcover)
- Pages: c. 800
- ISBN: 978-0-670-08415-9
- OCLC: 615860861

The Mahābhārata is a noted abridged translation of the Mahabharata by John D. Smith, first published in 2009 by Penguin Classics.

== Structure ==
Smith's book mimics the structure of the actual epic by maintaining its division into 18 books. So, the book starts with Book 1: Beginning (Adi Parva) and ends with Book 18: The Ascent to Heaven (Svargarohana Parva). The Mahābhārata itself includes more than 100,000 verses; Smith's book includes a line-by-line translation of around 11% of that original text. To explain the rest of the epic, Smith includes prose summaries that provide insight about the main narrative in the original 18 books.

For unfamiliar readers, the book contains the following supplementary materials:

- A linguistic guide for the pronunciation of Sanskrit words in the book.
- A map of ancient India providing geographical knowledge of the main settings of key events from the epic.
- Genealogical tables for the Pandava, Kuru, and Yadava lines of the Lunar Dynasty.
- A glossary.
- An essay introducing the epic.

== Quotations ==
Viewed through human eyes, the war at Kurukṣetra is fought to settle the dispute between two sets of royal cousins; from the point of view of Kṛṣṇa and the other gods, the entire world of men is merely the theatre in which their latest battle with their old rivals has to be played out. The gods are not engaging in that battle for our benefit, but for their own, and the niceties of particular human dharmas are not high among their priorities.

— John D. Smith, The Mahābhārata: Introduction

A portion of Śrī was born on earth for men to love: she was the blameless girl Draupadī

— John D. Smith, tr., The Mahābhārata

And a portion of Sri herself became incarnate on earth, for the gratification of Narayana, in the line of Bhishmaka. And she was by name the chaste Rukmini. And the faultless Draupadi, slender-waisted like the wasp, was born of a portion of Sachi (the queen of the celestials)

— K. M. Ganguli, tr., The Mahabharata: Book 1:Adi Parva

== Reviews ==
The last English translation of the Mahabharata, John D Smith’s 2009 Penguin Classics edition, was a happy midway mark between a proper scholarly or academic translated edition and a text for the general reader.

— Neel Mukherjee, New Statesman

I approached Dr. Smith’s book with some doubts—how could the world’s longest poem be squeezed into less than 800 pages? The attempts by Narsimhan, R.K. Narayan and others deprive the reader of the thematic richness and the brilliance of Vyasa’s narrative art. But the felicity with which Smith negotiates Vyasa’s labyrinthine forest is astonishing: pruning outgrowths, mowing down undergrowths, skirting deceptive byways! His strategy is to abridge without leaving out anything by providing précis of less important sections and translating fully the parts most significant in terms of narrative and style (about 11% of the original).

— Dr. Pradip Bhattacharya, The Sunday Statesman

In almost 800 pages this rendition of the critical text of Pune consists of direct and complete translation of about 11% of the Sanskrit text (p. lxviii) and straightforward summation of the text between the translated passages.

— Sanskrit in Classics at Brown

The Kolkata publisher, P Lal, spent his entire career "transcreating" the epic. The University of Chicago translator, JAB van Buitenen, died on the job. RK Narayan took a more relaxed approach, abridging it into one volume, as did the Cambridge Sanskritist, John D Smith. These short English versions are recommended for anyone who wishes to read the 'Mahabharata' without succumbing to exhaustion.

— Alice Albinia, The Independent

== Bibliography ==
- Smith, John D., ed. (2009). Mahābhārata. Penguin classics (1. publ ed.). London: Penguin. ISBN 978-0-14-044681-4.
