= Diadem snake =

There are two species of snake named diadem snake:

- Spalerosophis atriceps
- Spalerosophis diadema
