= Royal snake =

There are two species of snake named royal snake:

- Spalerosophis atriceps
- Spalerosophis diadema
