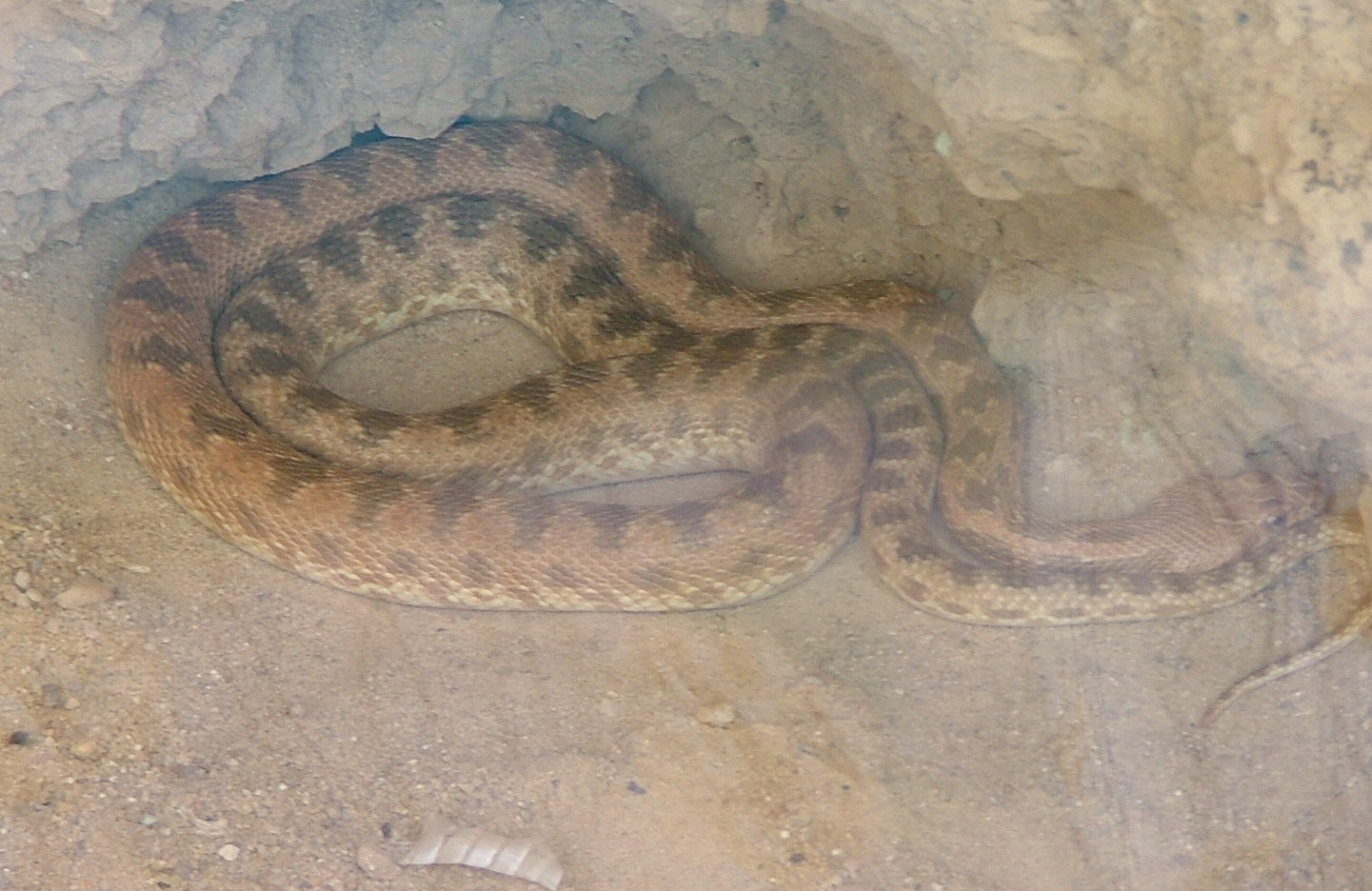
- Spalerosophis diadema cliffordi

Scientific classification
- Kingdom: Animalia
- Phylum: Chordata
- Class: Reptilia
- Order: Squamata
- Suborder: Serpentes
- Family: Colubridae
- Subfamily: Colubrinae
- Genus: Spalerosophis; Jan, 1865

Species
- Six recognized species, see article.

= Spalerosophis =

Genus of snakes

Spalerosophis is a small genus of snakes in the family Colubridae.

== Geographic range ==
Member species are found in a wide range throughout Southern Asia, the Middle East, and North Africa.

== Species ==
The following species six species are recognized as being valid.

- Spalerosophis arenarius (Boulenger, 1890) – red-spotted diadem snake, red-spotted royal snake
- Spalerosophis atriceps (Fischer, 1885) – diadem snake, royal snake
- Spalerosophis diadema (Schlegel, 1837) – diadem snake, royal snake
- Spalerosophis dolichospilus (F. Werner, 1923) – Mograbin diadem snake, Werner's diadem snake
- Spalerosophis josephscorteccii Lanza, 1964 – Scortecci's diadem snake
- Spalerosophis microlepis Jan, 1865 – Jan's diadem snake, zebra snake
