= Spalerosophis microlepis =

Conservation status
- Least Concern (IUCN 3.1)

Scientific classification
- Kingdom: Animalia
- Phylum: Chordata
- Class: Reptilia
- Order: Squamata
- Suborder: Serpentes
- Family: Colubridae
- Genus: Spalerosophis
- Species: S. microlepis

Binomial name
- Spalerosophis microlepis Jan, 1865

Species of snake

Spalerosophis microlepis, the zebra snake or Jan's diadem snake, is a species of snake of the family Colubridae.

The snake is found in Iran.
