= Spalerosophis arenarius =

Conservation status
- Least Concern (IUCN 3.1)

Scientific classification
- Kingdom: Animalia
- Phylum: Chordata
- Class: Reptilia
- Order: Squamata
- Suborder: Serpentes
- Family: Colubridae
- Genus: Spalerosophis
- Species: S. arenarius

Binomial name
- Spalerosophis arenarius (Boulenger, 1890)

Synonyms
- Zamenis arenarius Boulenger, 1890; Spalerosophis arenarius — Schmidt, 1930; Coluber arenarius — M.A. Smith, 1943; Spalerosophis arenarius — Minton, 1966

Species of snake

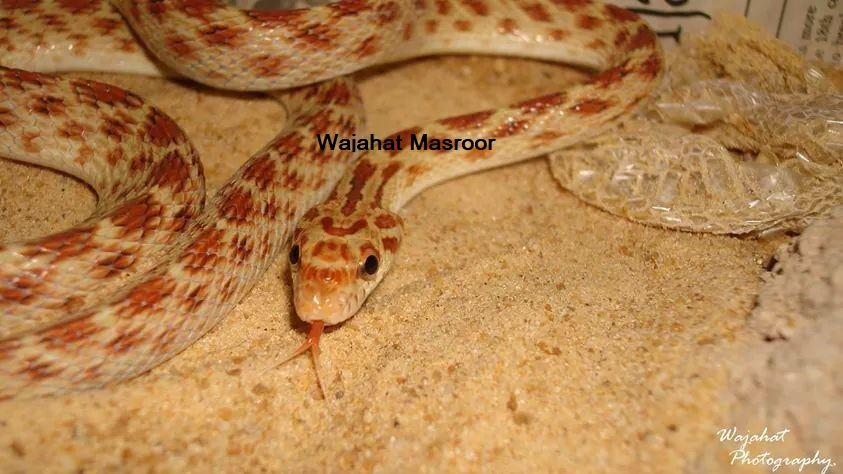
Male red spotted diadem

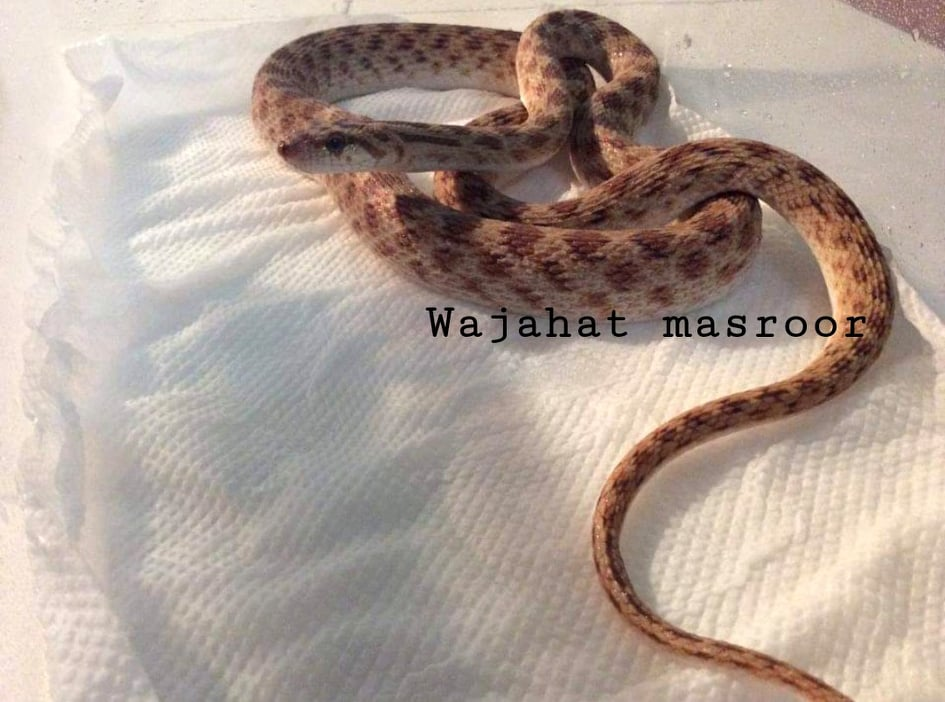

Spalerosophis arenarius, commonly known as the red-spotted diadem snake or the red-spotted royal snake, is a species of snake in the subfamily Colubrinae of the family Colubridae. The species is endemic to South Asia.

== Geographic range ==
S. arenarius is found in India (Rajasthan) and Pakistan (Karachi, Sindh).

== Description ==
S. arenarius grows to a total length (including tail) of about 1 m (39 inches). Dorsally, it is cream-colored or pale buff, with darker spots arranged quincuncially. There is also a darker stripe on each side of the neck. Ventrally, it is uniform white.

== Reproduction ==
S. arenarius is oviparous.

They do hibernate in the season of December to February and pairs start to mate in late March to April. Eggs are laid from May to July. A female weighing above 250 grams can produce a clutch of 7 to 10 eggs. A female finds a good spot for the incubation of eggs with a temperature of 28°-30 °C and humidity around 80-95%. A female lays and burrow its eggs at the laying site, no parental care is observed. Each eggs weigh around 7 grams. eggs take around 60 days to hatch. babies are 15 cm in length and feeds on lizards or small rodents at the first stage of their life.

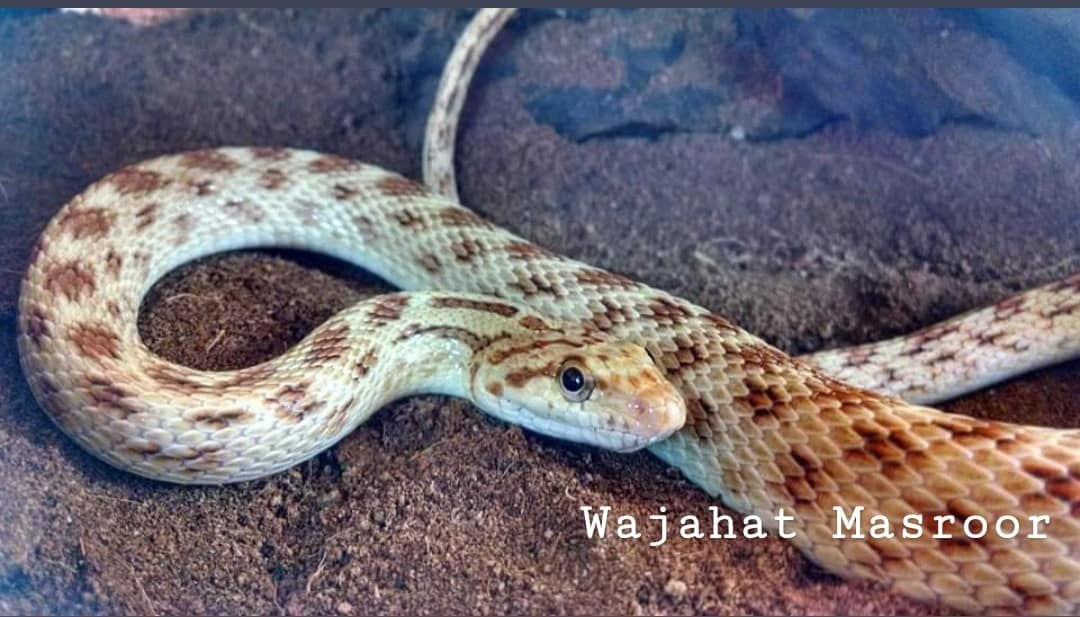
Female in captivity

== In Captivity ==
Red spotted diadems are common in pet trade in Pakistan for their docile nature and their attractive color and pattern. In Pakistan they can be seen with snake charmers or individuals who keep them as their pets.

== Breeding in captivity ==
Breeding red spotted diadem is easy in captivity but requires some simple steps.

They require a proper cycle which contains cooling them in winters. Pair is heavily fed till November and left to hibernate. During their hibernation period you just have to leave a water bowl in their enclosure and a hiding spot. no light or heat source was used in this period.

In February when temperature starts to increase you can offer them light to let them know its time to feed. when they are active again start offering them small meals and increase the frequency of offering meals to them to make them gain weight again.

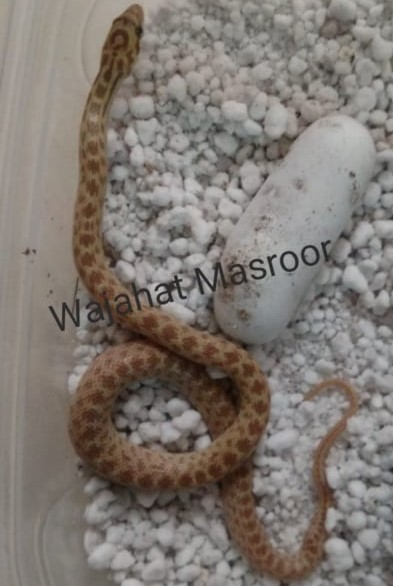
Captive Born specimen of red spotted diadem

When they shed for the first time after hibernation its time to introduce them to each other but make sure to check their weights before it. A female should weight at least 250 grams or above and for a male at least 200 grams is preferred. Introducing them more than one time to make sure the pair has been successfully mated. Introducing them at night will help the chances of the pair to mate. copulation takes place for 25–20 minutes after it you can again separate the pair when the lose interest in each other.

=== Preparing an Incubator ===
A simple plastic air tight container can be used for the purpose of incubation. In lid small tiny holes are made for ventilation. equal amount of perlite and distilled water is mixed to make it moist. When pressed it should not drain water from it. put a humidity and temperature meter. a humidity of 80-90% is required. Temperature ranges from 28°-30 °C.

Place eggs in incubator without turning them. If you want you can candle them to make sure they are alive. Slugs or infertile eggs will turn yellow and catch mold, immediately remove them from your clutch. You should open your incubator after couple of days for 2 minutes for air exchange because eggs respire and you don't want them to die. After 54–60 days eggs will start to hatch. When your baby snakes are done with their first shed you can offer them a pinky mice
