= Mograbin diadem snake =

Conservation status
- Data Deficient (IUCN 3.1)

Scientific classification
- Kingdom: Animalia
- Phylum: Chordata
- Class: Reptilia
- Order: Squamata
- Suborder: Serpentes
- Family: Colubridae
- Genus: Spalerosophis
- Species: S. dolichospilus

Binomial name
- Spalerosophis dolichospilus (F. Werner, 1923)

Synonyms
- Zamenis diadema var. dolichospila F. Werner, 1923; Coluber diadema dolichospila — F. Werner, 1929; Spalerosophis diadema dolichospilus — Schmidt, 1930; Coluber choumowitchi Domergue, 1954; Spalerosophis dolichospilus — Pasteur, 1967

Species of snake

The Mograbin diadem snake (Spalerosophis dolichospilus), also known commonly as Werner's diadem snake, is a species of snake in the family Colubridae. The species is endemic to northwestern Africa.

== Geographic range ==
Spalerosophis dolichospilus is found in Algeria, Morocco, and Tunisia.

== Habitat ==
The natural habitats of S. dolichospilus are subtropical or tropical, dry shrubland, rocky areas, arable land, and pastureland.

== Etymology ==
The common name, Mograbin diadem snake, is derived from "Maghreb", meaning "west" in Arabic.

== Description ==
Spalerosophis dolichospilus is usually about 120 cm (3.9 ft) in total length (including tail), but can reach 150 cm (4.9 ft). It is orange with circular spots of reddish or greenish brown.

== Behavior ==
Spalerosophis dolichospilus is very agile and can move quickly over rocky substrates.

== Reproduction ==
Spalerosophis dolichospilus is oviparous.
