= Spalerosophis josephscorteccii =

Conservation status
- Data Deficient (IUCN 3.1)

Scientific classification
- Kingdom: Animalia
- Phylum: Chordata
- Class: Reptilia
- Order: Squamata
- Suborder: Serpentes
- Family: Colubridae
- Genus: Spalerosophis
- Species: S. josephscorteccii

Binomial name
- Spalerosophis josephscorteccii Lanza, 1964

Species of snake

Spalerosophis josephscorteccii, Scortecci's diadem snake, is a species of snake of the family Colubridae. This snake is found in Somalia.
