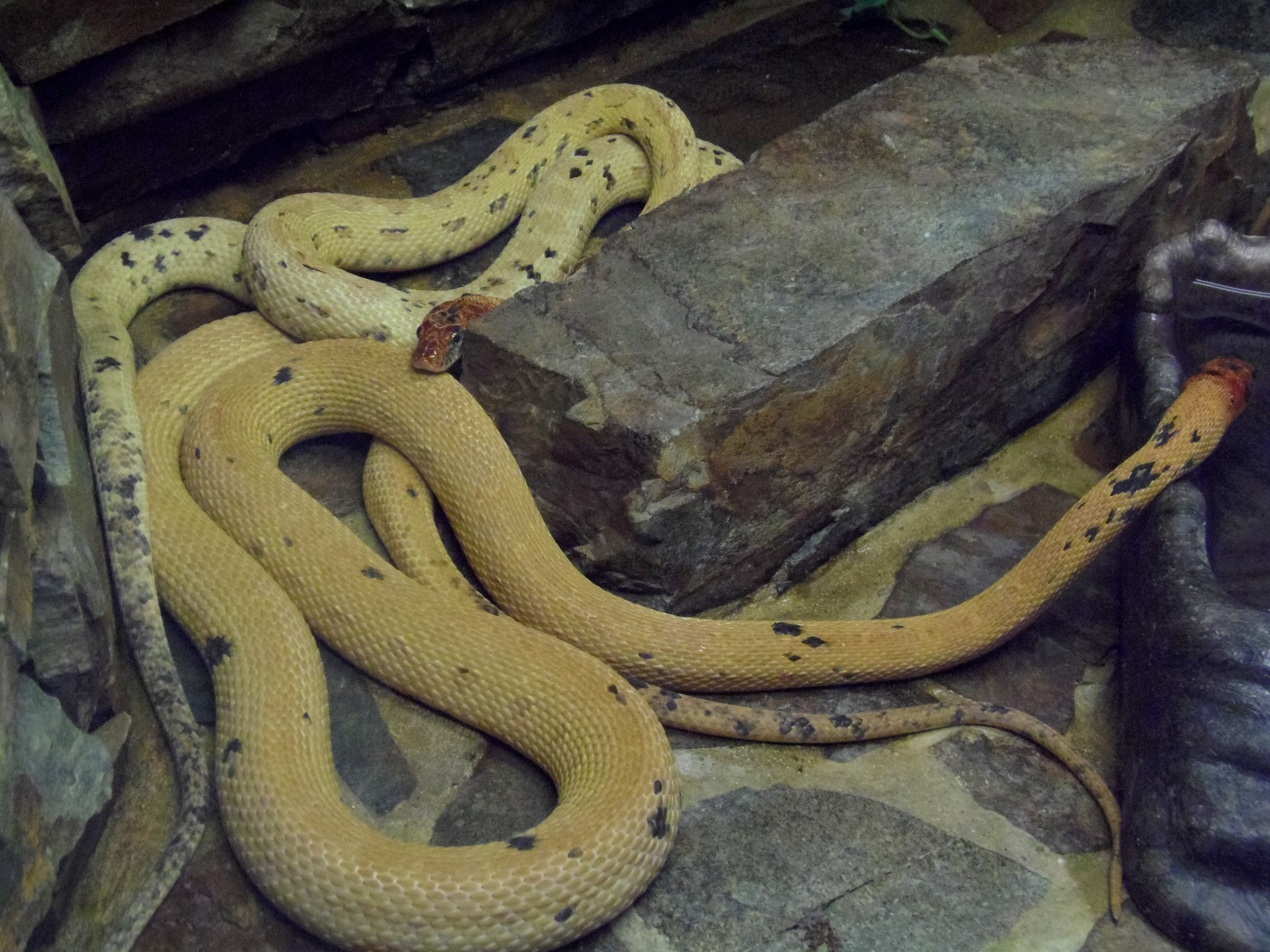

Conservation status
- Least Concern (IUCN 3.1)

Scientific classification
- Kingdom: Animalia
- Phylum: Chordata
- Class: Reptilia
- Order: Squamata
- Suborder: Serpentes
- Family: Colubridae
- Genus: Spalerosophis
- Species: S. atriceps

Binomial name
- Spalerosophis atriceps (Fischer, 1885)

Synonyms
- Zamenis diadema var. atriceps Fischer, 1885; Spalerosophis atriceps — Minton, 1966

= Spalerosophis atriceps =

Species of snake

Spalerosophis atriceps, the Black headed royal snake or Fischer's royal snake, is a species of snake in the family Colubridae. The species is endemic to South Asia.

== Geographic range ==
S. atriceps is found in northwestern India, Nepal, and Pakistan.

The type locality given in the original description is "Himalaya ".

== Habitat ==
The preferred habitats of S. atriceps are deserts, rocky areas, and scrub forest.

== Description ==
S. atriceps may attain a snout-to-vent length (SVL) of 2 m (6.6 ft). Dorsally, it is pale orange, pink, or yellow, with scattered black flecks. The dorsal surface of the head is either entirely black or black and deep red. The sides of the head and the nape of the neck are deep red. Ventrally, it is pinkish.

== Behavior ==
S. atriceps is nocturnal.

== Reproduction ==
S. atriceps is oviparous. In India, the adult female lays a clutch of 3 to 8 eggs in October. The eggs are 56–78 mm (2.2–3.1 in) long by 16–27 mm (0.63–1.06 in) wide.
