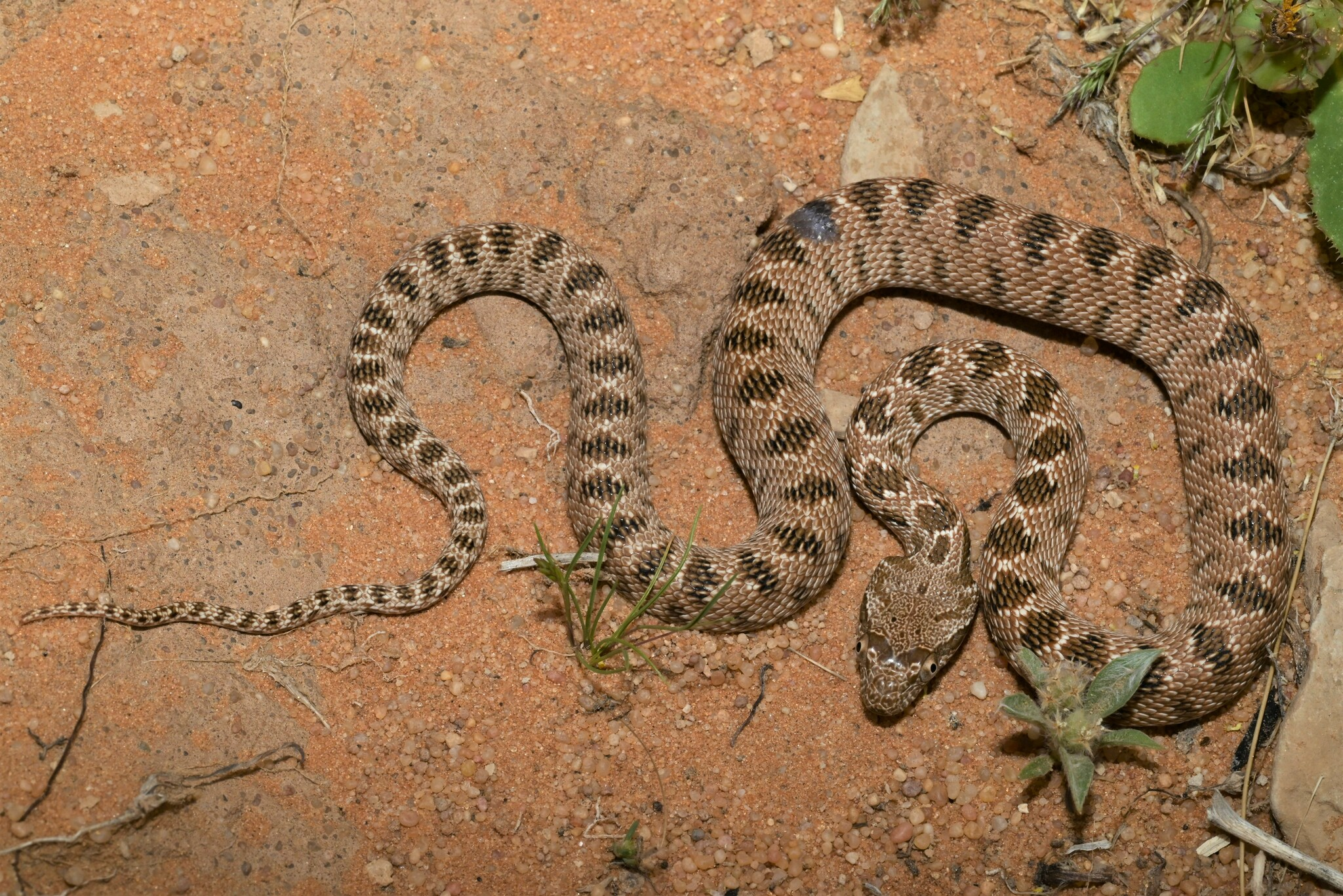
- From Saudi Arabia

Conservation status
- Least Concern (IUCN 3.1)

Scientific classification
- Kingdom: Animalia
- Phylum: Chordata
- Class: Reptilia
- Order: Squamata
- Suborder: Serpentes
- Family: Colubridae
- Genus: Spalerosophis
- Species: S. diadema

Binomial name
- Spalerosophis diadema (Schlegel, 1837)

Synonyms
- Coluber diadema Schlegel, 1837; Zamenis diadema — Günther, 1858; Spalerosophis diadema — Schmidt, 1930

= Spalerosophis diadema =

Species of snake

Spalerosophis diadema, known commonly as the blotched diadem snake and the blotched royal snake, is a species of large snake in the subfamily Colubrinae of the family Colubridae. The species is endemic to Asia and northern Africa.

== Geographic range ==
S. diadema is found in Algeria, Afghanistan, Egypt, northern India, Iran, Iraq, Israel, Lebanon, Jordan, southern Kazakhstan, Kyrgyzstan, Libya, Mali, Mauritania, Morocco, Niger, Oman, United Arab Emirates, western Pakistan, Russia, Saudi Arabia, northern Sudan, Syria, Tajikistan, Tunisia, Turkey, southern Turkmenistan, and Uzbekistan.

== Subspecies ==
Three subspecies of S. diadema are recognized as being valid, including the nominotypical subspecies, and are found as follows.

- Spalerosophis diadema cliffordi (Schlegel, 1837) – from Morocco to Egypt and Israel (Type locality: Tripoli, Libya)
- Spalerosophis diadema diadema (Schlegel, 1837) – India, Pakistan (Type locality: near "Bombay", India)
- Spalerosophis diadema schiraziana (Jan, 1865) – Zagros Mountains and the region of Bushire in western Iran, eastwards to southern Turkmenistan into Afghanistan and India; Pakistan (Type locality: Shiraz, Iran)

== Etymology ==
The subspecific name, cliffordi, is in honor of "M[onsieur]. Clifford Cocq van Breugel " who was Dutch consul at Tripoli, probably referring to Jacques Fabrice Herman Clifford Kocq van Breugel (1799–1867).

== Description ==
S. diadema may attain a total length of 1.8 m (about 6 feet), of which about 34 cm (13½ inches) is tail. Dorsally, it is pale buff or sandy grey, with a median series of dark blotches, and smaller dark spots. Ventrally, it is usually uniform white, but rarely has small blackish spots.

== Reproduction ==
S. diadema is oviparous.

== Gallery ==
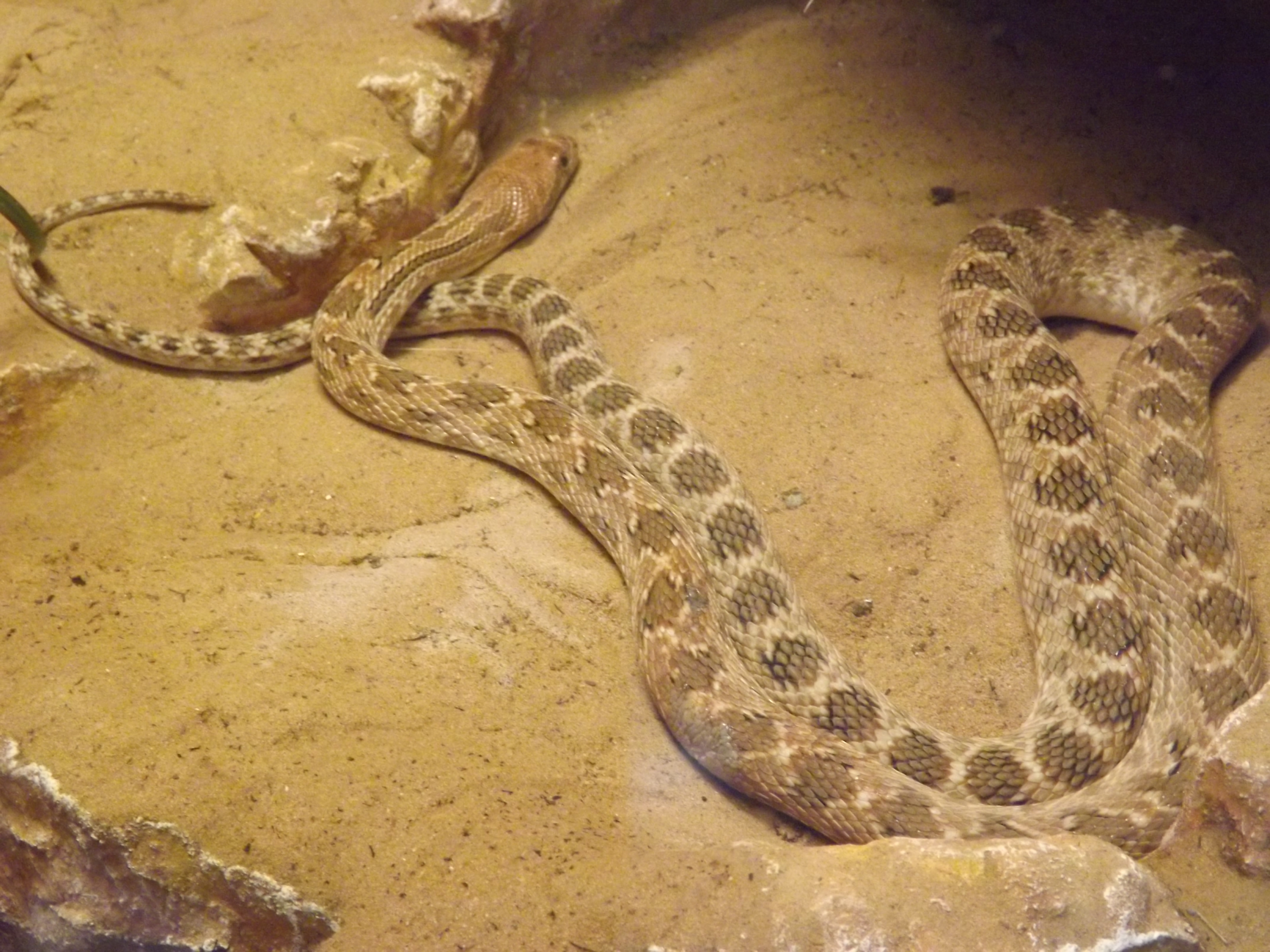
Israeli subspecies, S. d. cliffordi, commonly called Clifford's snake. Jerusalem Biblical Zoo

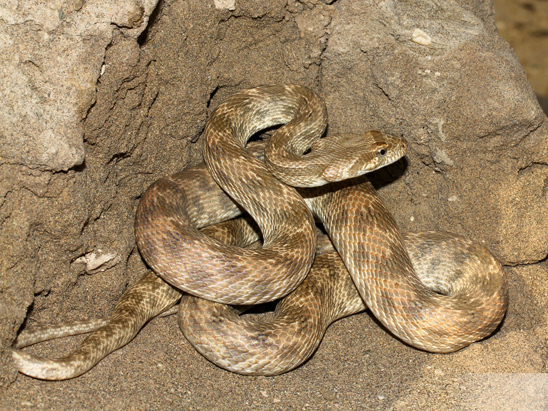
In Iran

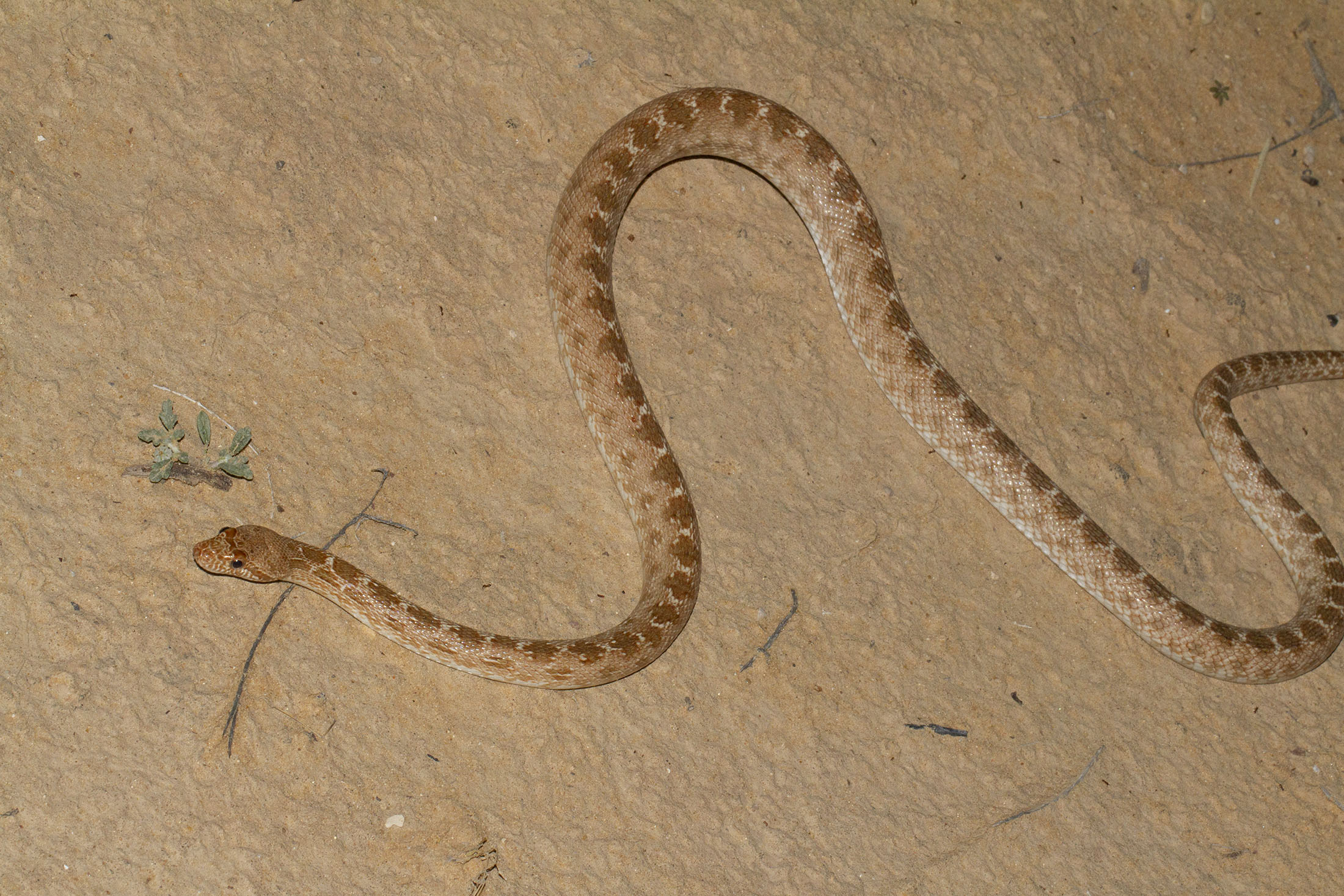
In Sheizaf Nature Reserve, Israel

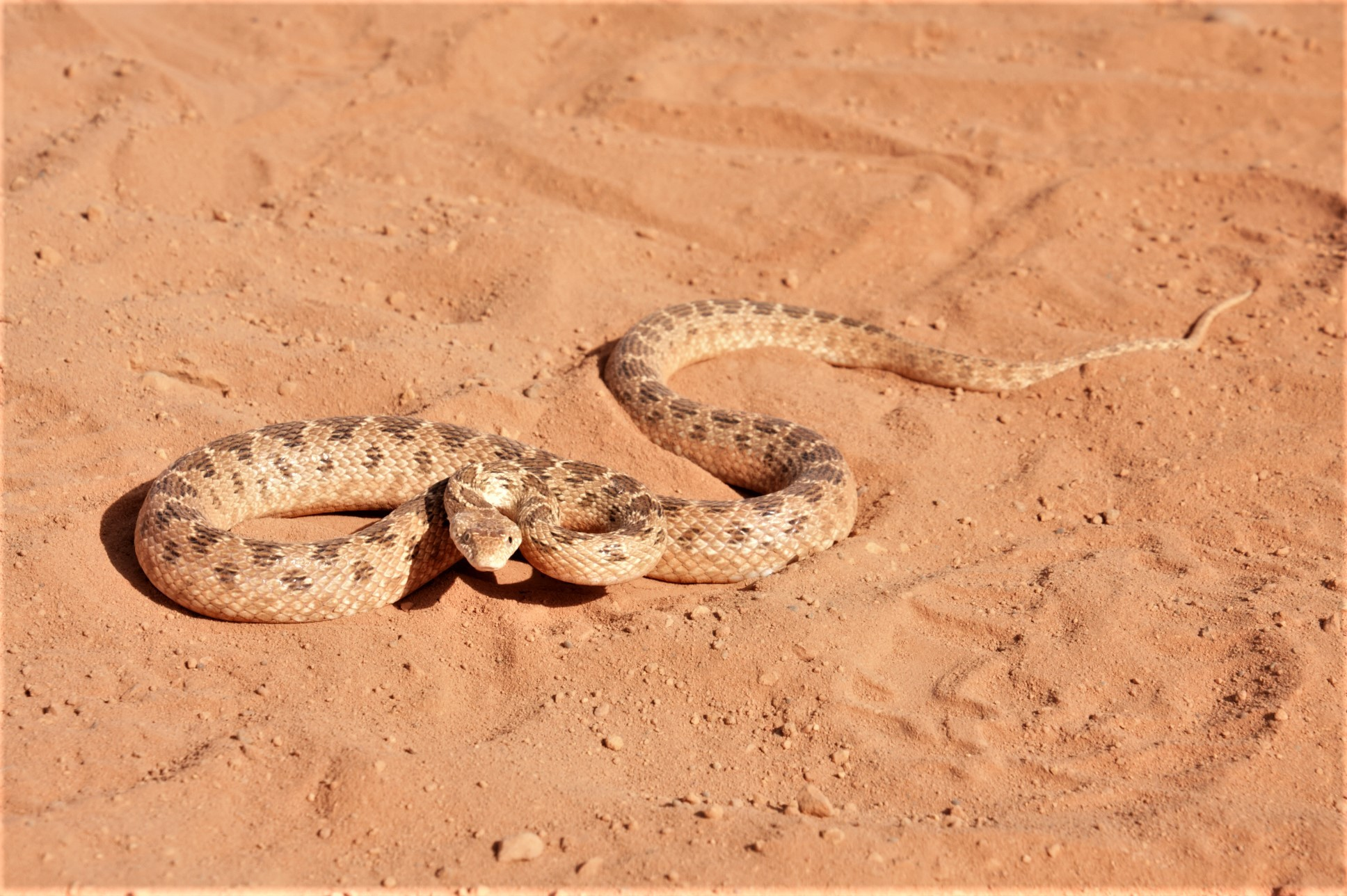
In Niger

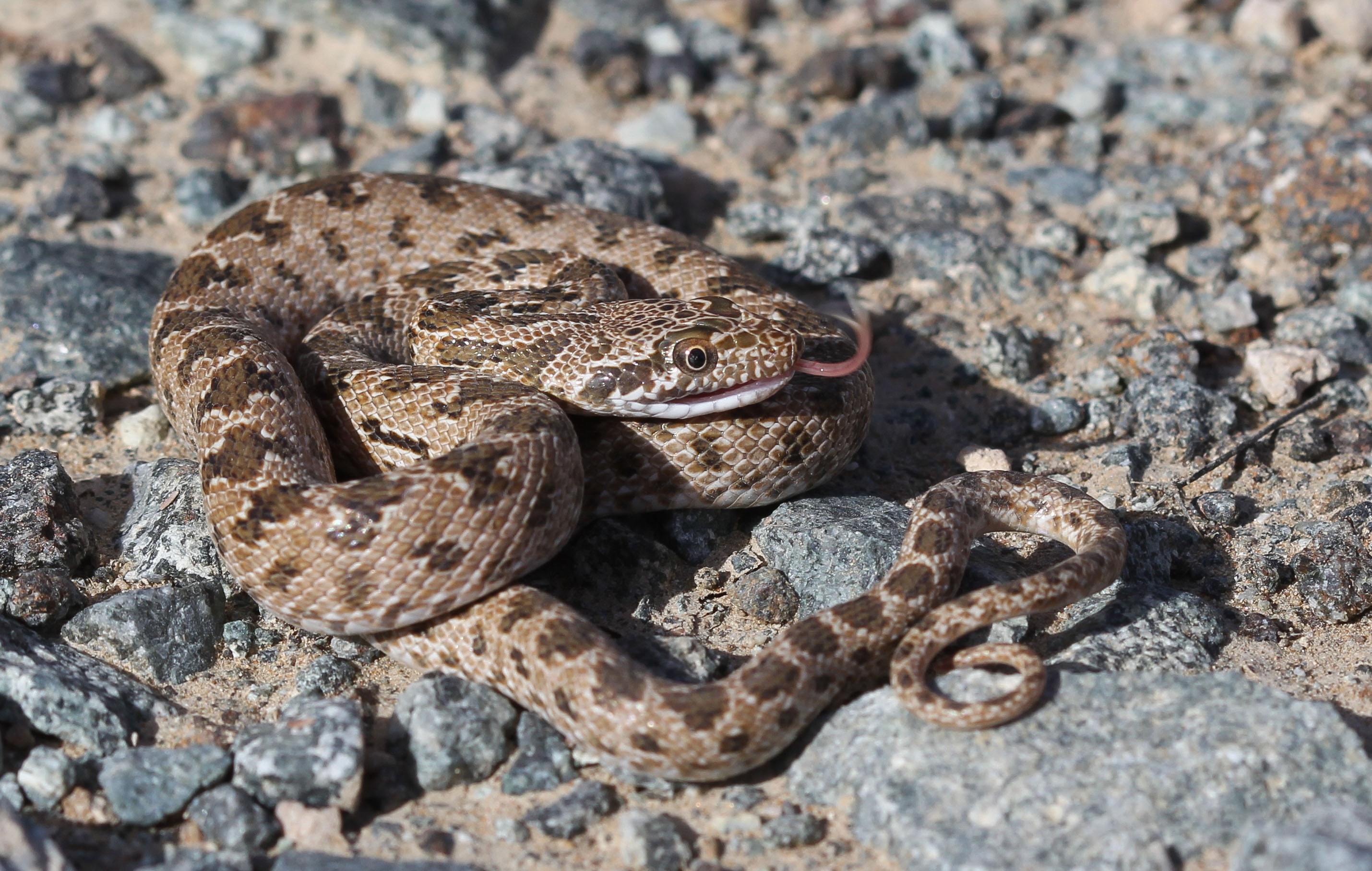
Diadem snake from Ras Al Khaimah, United Arab Emirates

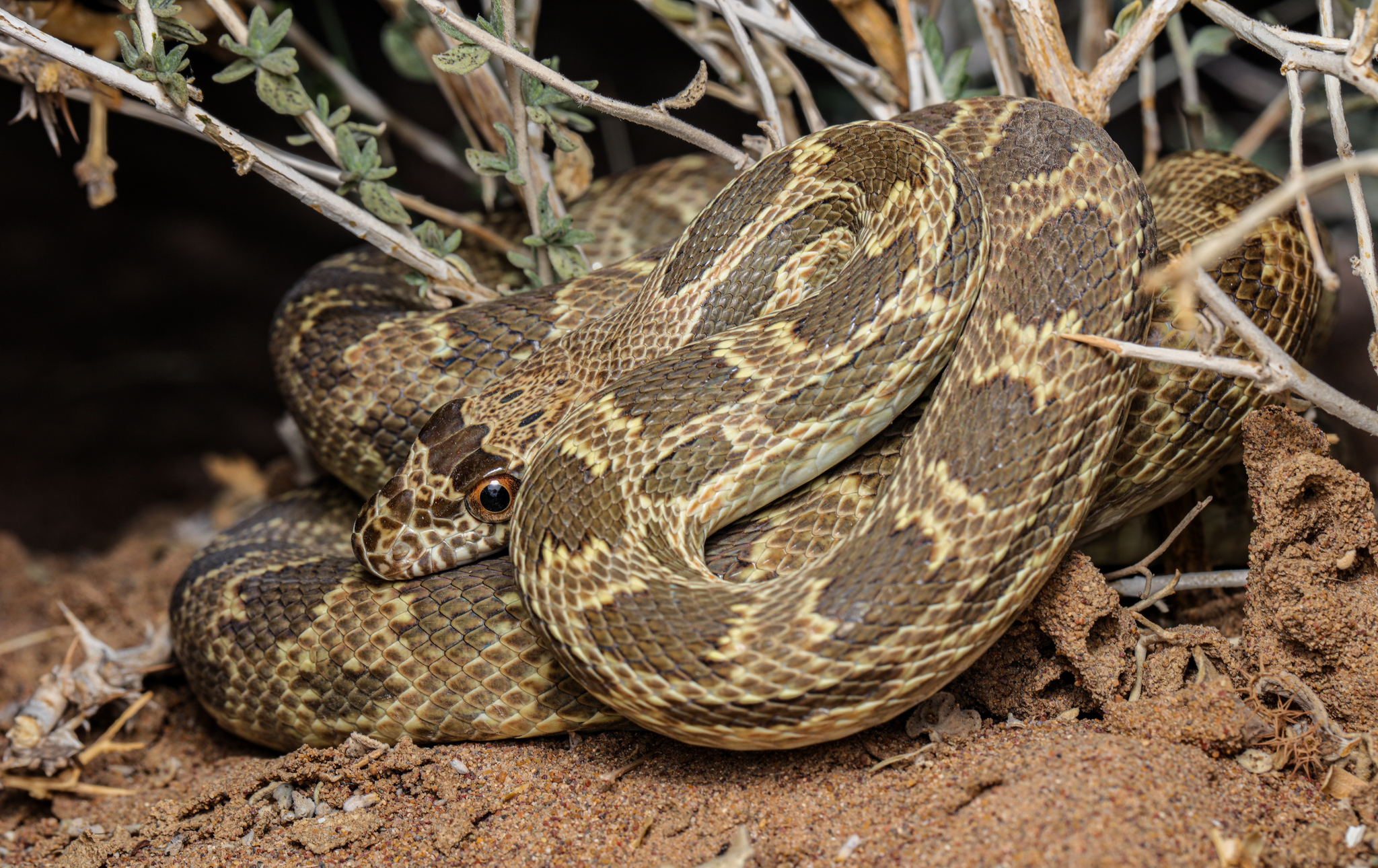
In Ahvaz

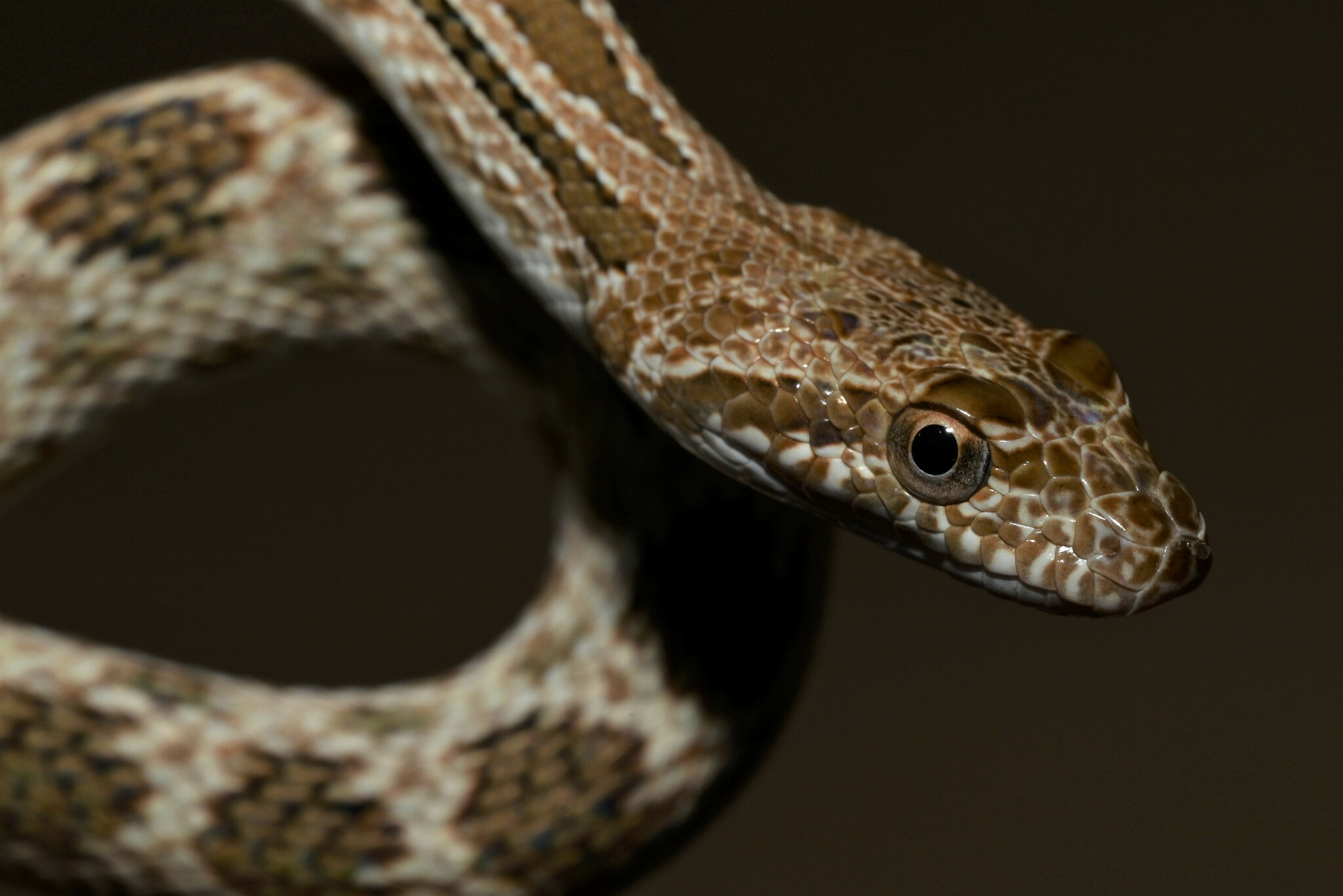
In Saudi Arabia

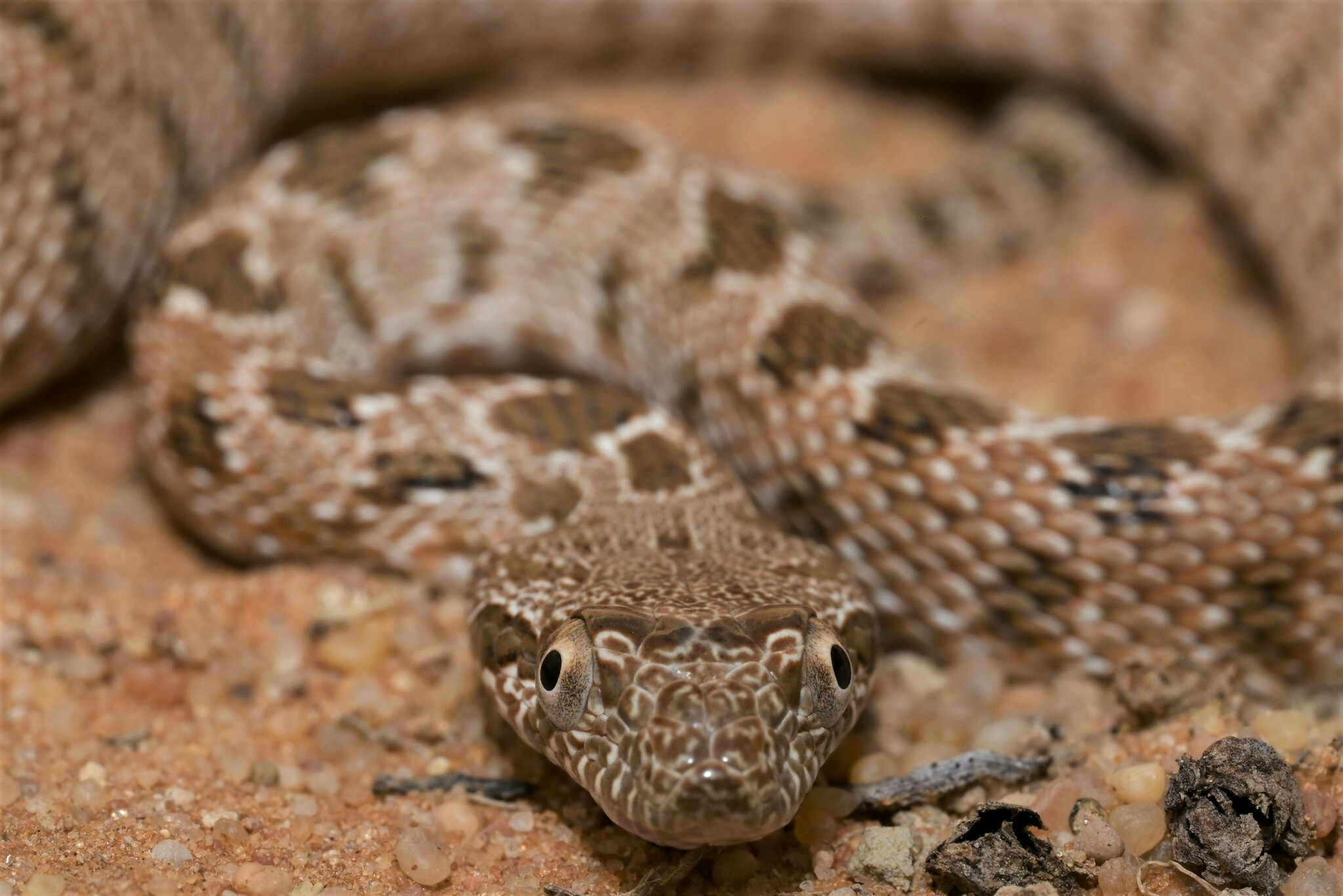
In Saudi Arabia
