= Orixalus =

Scientific classification
- Kingdom: Animalia
- Phylum: Chordata
- Class: Amphibia
- Order: Anura
- Family: Rhacophoridae
- Subfamily: Rhacophorinae
- Genus: Orixalus; Delorme, Dubois, Grosjean & Ohler, 2005

Type species
- Gracixalus nonggangensis Dubois, Ohler, and Pyron, 2021

Diversity
- See text

Genus of amphibians

Orixalus is a genus of frogs in the family Rhacophoridae, subfamily Rhacophorinae. They are endemic to Myanmar, Thailand, Vietnam and two provinces in China: Yunnan and Guangxi. This genus is a sister taxon to Gracixalus from which it was split.

== Species ==
These species are in Orixalus:

- Orixalus ananjevae (Matsui and Orlov, 2004)
- Orixalus carinensis (Boulenger, 1893)
- Orixalus jinxiuensis (Hu, 1978)
- Orixalus nonggangensis (Mo, Zhang, Luo, Zhou, and Chen, 2013)
- Orixalus waza (Mo, Zhang, Luo, Zhou, and Chen, 2013)
