= Small treefrog =

Small treefrog may refer to:

- Black eye-lidded small treefrog, a frog found in China, Vietnam, and Thailand
- Hainan small treefrog, a frog found in Cambodia, China, Laos, Thailand, and possibly India and Myanmar
- Jinxiu small treefrog, a frog found in China and Vietnam
- Longchuan small treefrog, a frog found in China, Vietnam, and possibly Myanmar
- Medog small treefrog, a frog found in China
- Mengla small treefrog, a frog endemic to Yunnan, China
- Ocellated small treefrog, a frog endemic to Hainan Island, China
- Serrate-legged small treefrog, a frog found in China, Vietnam, Laos, and possibly Myanmar
