= Ocellated frog =

Ocellated frog may refer to:

- Ocellated bubble-nest frog (Liuixalus ocellatus), a frog in the family Rhacophoridae endemic to Hainan Island, China
- Ocellated spiny frog (Nanorana feae), a frog in the family Dicroglossidae found in Yunnan, China, and Kachin Hills in Myanmar

== See also ==
- Ocellated treefrog (disambiguation)
