= Orixalus ananjevae =

Ananjeva Asian treefrog

Conservation status
- Least Concern (IUCN 3.1)

Scientific classification
- Kingdom: Animalia
- Phylum: Chordata
- Class: Amphibia
- Order: Anura
- Family: Rhacophoridae
- Genus: Orixalus
- Species: O. ananjevae

Binomial name
- Orixalus ananjevae (Matsui & Orlov, 2004)

Synonyms
- Chirixalus ananjevae Matsui & Orlov, 2004 Kurixalus ananjevae Li, Che, Bain, Zhao, and Zhang, 2008

Species of amphibian

Orixalus ananjevae, the Ananjeva Asian treefrog, is a species of frog in the family Rhacophoridae.

The adult frog measures 32 mm to 43 mm in snout-vent length. There are small, white tubercles on the snout and disks on the toes for climbing with minimal webbing on the feet. The adult male frog has longer legs than the adult female frog. The adult female frog has warts near her vent. The skin of the dorsum is grayish in color. There are dark marks on the sides of the body.

This frog lives in mountain and lowland forests, where it has been observed between 100 and 1500 meters above sea level. Scientists believe the female frog lays eggs in still water, like frogs in Gracixalus.

Scientists classify this frog as least concern of extinction because of its large range, which includes a protected park: Quang Nam Elephant Habitat and Species Conservation area in Vietnam. It is subject to habitat loss associated with deforestation, especially for agriculture.
