= Gracixalus sapaensis =

Conservation status
- Endangered (IUCN 3.1)

Scientific classification
- Kingdom: Animalia
- Phylum: Chordata
- Class: Amphibia
- Order: Anura
- Family: Rhacophoridae
- Genus: Gracixalus
- Species: G. sapaensis

Binomial name
- Gracixalus sapaensis Matsui, Ohler, Eto, and Nguyen, 2017

Species of frog

Gracixalus sapaensis, the Sapa bush frog, is a species of frog in the family Rhacophoridae. It is endemic to Vietnam and suspected in China. It has been observed between 1250 and 2362 meters above sea level.

This frog has been observed in the Fan Si Pan mountains, where it is known in forests and scrubland, though it has occasionally been seen on farms, which suggests it may be able to tolerate a degree of habitat disturbance. The frog is found perched on plants about 2 m above the ground.

Scientists classify this frog as endangered because of its small, threatened range, which is subject to continued degradation as humans build farms and infrastructure for tourism. This range includes at least one protected park: Hoang Lien Son National Park. Climate change may also pose some threat to this frog because it lives in high-elevation habitats that are not readily conducive to northward migration.

Scientists once considered this species a subpopulation of Gracixalus carinensis.
