= Romerus hainanus =

Conservation status
- Vulnerable (IUCN 3.1)

Scientific classification
- Kingdom: Animalia
- Phylum: Chordata
- Class: Amphibia
- Order: Anura
- Family: Rhacophoridae
- Genus: Liuixalus
- Species: L. hainanus

Binomial name
- Liuixalus hainanus (Liu & Wu, 2004)

Synonyms
- Philautus hainanus Liu & Wu, 2004; Romerus hainanus Dubois, Ohler & Pyron, 2021

Species of frog

Liuixalus hainanus or the Hainan small tree frog is a species of frog in the family Rhacophoridae. It is endemic to Hainan Island, China. It was first seen in its type locality, Mount Diaoluo in Lingshui Li Autonomous County, 710 meters above sea level.

Liuixalus hainanus resembles Liuixalus ocellatus.

== Habitat ==
This frog has been observed between 660 and 760 meters above sea level in areas with bushes and trees. This frog lives in thickets not far from mountain streams. It seems to survive in some disturbed habitats so long as there is a supply of good water nearby.

This frog's range includes several protected parks: Diaoluoshan Nature Reserve, Jianfengling Nature Reserve, Jiaxi Nature Reserve, Yingelling Nature Reserve, Exiangling Nature Reserve, and Bawangling Nature Reserve.

== Reproduction ==
Scientists infer that this frog breeds through larval development, like other frogs in Romerus.

== Threats ==
The IUCN classifies this species as vulnerable to extinction. The principal threat is habitat loss associated with agriculture, notably small rubber, banana, and areca farms. Pollution can also hurt this frog. Scientists also cite subsistence wood collection as a threat.

== Original description ==
- Hertwig ST; Schweizer M; Das I; Haas A (April 13, 2013). "Diversification in a biodiversity hotspot - the evolution of southeast Asian rhacophorid frogs on Borneo (Amphibia: Anura: Rhacophoridae)". Molecular Phylogenetics and Evolution. 68 (3): 567–81. doi:10.1016/j.ympev.2013.04.001. PMID 23578599.
