= Rohanixalus senapatiensis =

Senapati's tree frog

Conservation status
- Least Concern (IUCN 3.1)

Scientific classification
- Kingdom: Animalia
- Phylum: Chordata
- Class: Amphibia
- Order: Anura
- Family: Rhacophoridae
- Genus: Rohanixalus
- Species: R. senapatiensis

Binomial name
- Rohanixalus senapatiensis (Mathew and Sen, 2009)

Synonyms
- Chirixalus senapatiensis Mathew and Sen, 2009; Chiromantis senapatiensis (Mathew and Sen, 2009)

Species of frog

Rohanixalus senapatiensis, commonly known as Senapti's tree frog, is a species of frog in the family Rhacophoridae endemic to north-eastern India. It is only known from its type locality around the Mabing river near Kangpokpi in Senapati district, Manipur state.

== Taxonomy ==
Formerly described in Chirixalus, it was moved to the new genus Rohanixalus in 2020 following a phylogenetic study.

== Habitat ==
This frog lives in forests, predominantly the edges of forests. It has also been seen on plantations, near human habitation, and in secondary forest. It does not appear to need closed-canopy habitat, but it does require shrub and vegetation cover. This frog has been observed between 200 and 1600 meters above sea level.

The frog's range includes at least one protected park: Ngengpui Wildlife Sanctuary.

== Reproduction ==
Scientists believe this frog breeds in early May, near the start of India's monsoon rains. The male frogs call to the female frogs around dusk and have not been reported calling during the day.

== Threats ==
The IUCN classifies this frog as least concern of extinction. What threat it faces comes from habitat loss and fragmentation in favor of human habitation, roads, and agriculture and because of water pollution associated with pesticides, herbicides, and runoff. Vehicle disturbance might also affect this frog.

== Description ==
It was originally described as being most similar in its appearance to Rohanixalus vittatus. It has a dark middorsal stripe. Webbing on hands is rudimentary.

== Original description ==
- Mathew R; Sen N. (2009). "Studies on little known amphibian species of northeast India". Rec. Zool. Surv. India Occ. Paper. 293: 1–64.4.
