= Gracixalus trieng =

Scientific classification
- Domain: Eukaryota
- Kingdom: Animalia
- Phylum: Chordata
- Class: Amphibia
- Order: Anura
- Family: Rhacophoridae
- Genus: Gracixalus
- Species: G. trieng

Binomial name
- Gracixalus trieng Rowley, Le, Hoang, Cao, and Dau, 2020
- Gracixalus trieng is only known from the Đắk Glei District in central Vietnam

Species of amphibian

Gracixalus trieng, also known as the Trieng tree frog or Trieng bushfrog, is a species of frog in the family Rhacophoridae. It is endemic to Vietnam and is only known from the area of its type locality, Ngoc Linh Nature Reserve in Đắk Glei District, Kon Tum Province. Mount Ngoc Linh and adjacent peaks form an isolated high-elevation area and the species is unlikely to exist elsewhere.

== Etymology ==
The specific name trieng refers to the local Trieng people who assisted the describers of this species in their field work.

== Description ==
Adult males measure 37–41 mm (1.5–1.6 in) in snout–vent length (SVL). Adult females are unknown; two juveniles measured 20–24 mm (0.8–0.9 in) in SVL. The body is robust. The snout is rounded. The tympanum and supratympanic fold are distinct. The fingers are narrow and bear well-developed discs; there is basal webbing between the fingers II–IV. The toes bear well-developed discs and are webbed. Skin texture varies from almost completely smooth to having scattered low tubercles. The typical diurnal coloration is dark brown dorsally and dark pinkish brown ventrally, with distinct dark brown dorsal markings, where the typical nocturnal coloration is mostly pale yellow dorsally and pale pink ventrally, without the distinct dorsal markings.

Advertisement call is unknown, but males do have a vocal sac.

== Habitat ==
Gracixalus trieng inhabits montane evergreen forest at elevations of 1,716–2,055 m (5,630–6,742 ft) above sea level; searches at lower elevations did not reveal this species. All adult males were found in tree holes, the breeding habitat of this species. Also juvenile frogs are arboreal.

== Conservation ==
As of November 2021, this species has not been included in the IUCN Red List of Threatened Species. However, Rowley and colleagues suggest that it would qualify as "endangered" because of its restricted range (extent of occurrence likely less than 1000 km^{2}), within which deforestation leading to habitat loss is occurring.
