= Gracixalus guangdongensis =

Conservation status
- Least Concern (IUCN 3.1)

Scientific classification
- Kingdom: Animalia
- Phylum: Chordata
- Class: Amphibia
- Order: Anura
- Family: Rhacophoridae
- Genus: Gracixalus
- Species: G. guangdongensis

Binomial name
- Gracixalus guangdongensis Wang, Zeng, Liu, and Wang, 2018

Species of frog

Gracixalus guangdongensis, the Guangdong tree frog, is a species of frog in the family Rhacophoridae. It is endemic to China, where it has been observed in Guangdong Province and Hunan Province.

The adult male frog measures 26.1–34.7 mm in snout-vent length and the adult female frog is 34.9–35.4 mm. The webbed skin is more developed on the back feet than on the front feet. The skin of the dorsum is brown or beige in color with a darker mark in the shape of the letter Y on the back. The male frog has a visible vocal sac.

This frog lives in bamboo forests on hills with evergreen and broadleaf trees. It has been observed between 600 and 1600 meters above sea level. The eggs and embryos have been observed in water in bamboo plants.

Scientists classify this frog as at least concern of extinction. Its range includes some protected parks: Dawuling Nature Reserve, Mangshan Nature Reserve, Nanling Nature Reserve, and Mount Nankun Nature Reserve. However, scientists do not believe the frog lives extensively in between the areas where it has been sighted because other frogs in Gracixalus occupy those niches. This frog still faces some threat associated with habitat loss: Human being cut down trees to collect wood and build farms. Tourists can disturb this frog.
