= Liuixalus feii =

Conservation status
- Least Concern (IUCN 3.1)

Scientific classification
- Kingdom: Animalia
- Phylum: Chordata
- Class: Amphibia
- Order: Anura
- Family: Rhacophoridae
- Genus: Liuixalus
- Species: L. feii

Binomial name
- Liuixalus feii Yang, Rao & Wang, 2015

Synonyms
- Romerus feii Dubois, Ohler and Pyron, 2021; Liuixalus jinxiuensis Li, Mo, Xie, and Jiang in Qin, Mo, Jiang, Cai, Xie, Jiang, Murphy, Li, and Wang, 2015; Romerus jinxiuensis Dubois, Ohler and Pyron, 2021

Species of frog

Liuixalus feii, or Fei's small tree frog, is a species of frog in the family Rhacophoridae. It is native to China and Vietnam. It has been osberved between 350 and 800 meters above sea level.

== Appearance ==
The adult male frog measures 16.2 to 17.6 mm long in snout-vent length and the adult female frog 18.0 to 18.7 mm. This frog has a mark in the shape of an X, sometimes interrupted, on its back. There is another a mark between the eyes.

== Entymology ==
This frog is named after herpetologist Liang Fei.

== Habitat ==
This frog lives in pristine primary forest. It dwells on the leaf litter. Its known range includes two protected parks: Heishiding Nature Reserve and Dayaoshan Nature Reserve.

== Reproduction ==
Scientists think this frog breeds in phytotelms in trees or bamboo.
