= Rohanixalus nauli =

Conservation status
- Endangered (IUCN 3.1)

Scientific classification
- Kingdom: Animalia
- Phylum: Chordata
- Class: Amphibia
- Order: Anura
- Family: Rhacophoridae
- Genus: Rohanixalus
- Species: R. nauli

Binomial name
- Rohanixalus nauli (Riyanto and Kurniati, 2014)

Synonyms
- Chiromantis nauli Riyanto and Kurniati, 2014; Chirixalus nauli (Riyanto and Kurniati, 2014); Feihyla nauli (Riyanto and Kurniati, 2014)

Species of frog

Rohanixalus nauli, the Nauli bubble-nest frog, is a species of frog in the family Rhacophoridae. Scientists know it exclusively from the type locality: Teluk Nauli in Indonesia.

== Habitat ==
This frog lives in primary and secondary forest and seems to tolerate disturbed habitats very well. This frog has been observed between 900 and 1000 meters above sea level.

This frog lives on Mount Sinabung.

== Reproduction ==
Scientists have not reported this frog's breeding strategy.

== Threats ==
The IUCN classifies this frog as endangered. Mt. Sinabung is an active volcano. When it erupts, it puts out ash plumes and pyroclastic matter and causes avalanches. Mt. Sinabung began erupting in 2010 and never truly stopped, with one especially large event in 2017. Scientists have also seen via satellite imagery that human beings have encroached on the forest to build small farms, establish plantations for palm oil, and establish grazing for domesticated animals.
