= Gracixalus seesom =

Scientific classification
- Kingdom: Animalia
- Phylum: Chordata
- Class: Amphibia
- Order: Anura
- Family: Rhacophoridae
- Genus: Gracixalus
- Species: G. seesom

Binomial name
- Gracixalus seesom Matsui, Khonsue, Panha, and Eto, 2015

Species of amphibian

Gracixalus seesom, also known as the orange bush frog or orange bushfrog, is a species of frog in the family Rhacophoridae. It is endemic to northwestern Thailand and is known from the Kanchanaburi and Chiang Mai Provinces.

== Etymology ==
The specific name seesom is derived from Thai words see and som for "orangish" and "color", respectively, and alludes to the coloration of the ventral surfaces of the limbs of this frog.

== Description ==
Adult males measure 22–24 mm (0.9–0.9 in) and adult females 23–25 mm (0.9–1.0 in) in snout–vent length. The body is dorsoventrally compressed. The head is wider than it is long and slightly wider than the body. The snout is pointed in dorsal view and rounded laterally. The eyes are large. The tympanum is distinct and nearly circular;supratympanic fold is present. Both toes and fingers bear expanded discs with circummarginal grooves; the fingers have traces of webbing while the toes are webbed. Skin is dorsally nearly smooth, with only sparsely scattered minute, blunt tubercles between the shoulder and sacral regions. The dorsum is tan with small, dark brown spots forming an interrupted X-like marking. A faint lighter line runs from the snout through the upper eyelid to the supratympanic fold and continues posteriorly, separating the tan dorsum and the darker flank. The flanks have large white blotches. Bright orange coloration is found on the underside of the forelimb, posterior to insertion of arm, and underside of hindlimb, continuing to anterior and posterior surfaces of thigh to tarsus, dorsal surface of inner four toes, and groin. The iris is golden with a web of fine black reticulations concentrated around periphery.

== Habitat ==
Gracixalus seesom is known from elevations of 942–1,650 m (3,091–5,413 ft) above sea level. At the type locality, specimens were found at night perching on twigs of short shrubs along a dried stream. Despite surveys during all seasons, G. seesom were only encountered in early January, a period with little rain and low temperatures.

== Conservation ==
As of November 2021, this species has not been included in the IUCN Red List of Threatened Species. The known specimens have been collected in nationals parks: the type locality is in the Thong Pha Phum National Park, and the other known population occurs in the Doi Inthanon National Park.
