= Thorny frog =

Thorny frog may refer to:

- Brown thorny frog, a frog found in the Malay Peninsula, Borneo, and the Philippines
- Thorny spikethumb frog, a frog found in Guatemala and Mexico
- Thorny tree frog, a frog native to Vietnam
