= Gracixalus tianlinensis =

Conservation status
- Data Deficient (IUCN 3.1)

Scientific classification
- Kingdom: Animalia
- Phylum: Chordata
- Class: Amphibia
- Order: Anura
- Family: Rhacophoridae
- Genus: Gracixalus
- Species: G. tianlinensis

Binomial name
- Gracixalus tianlinensis Chen, Bei, Liao, Zhou, and Mo, 2018

Species of frog

Gracixalus tianlinensis, the Tianlin small tree frog, is a species of frog in the family Rhacophoridae. It is endemic to China's Tianlin County.

The adult male frog measures 30.3–35.9 mm (1.19–1.41 in) in snout-vent length and the adult female frog 35.6–38.7 mm (1.40–1.52 in). The head is wider than it is long and there are no vomerine teeth. The skin of the dorsum is brown to beige in color with a dark brown mark shaped like the letter Y. The axilla and tops of the legs are yellow in color. The throat and chest are gray in color. The belly is cream-white in color. The iris of the eye is brown in color with fine black reticulations.

This frog has been found on hills in combined evergreen-bamboo forests. It has been observed 1,858 meters (6,096 ft) above sea level. Scientists believe that this frog breeds in streams and that the tadpoles develop in water-filled holes in bamboo, like other frogs in Gracixalus do.

Little is known about this frog's range, but it includes at least one protected park: Cenwanglaoshan National Nature Reserve.
