= Gracixalus truongi =

Scientific classification
- Kingdom: Animalia
- Phylum: Chordata
- Class: Amphibia
- Order: Anura
- Family: Rhacophoridae
- Genus: Gracixalus
- Species: G. truongi

Binomial name
- Gracixalus truongi Tran, Pham, Le, Nguyen, Ziegler, and Pham, 2023

Species of frog

Gracixalus truongi, or Truong's tree frog, is a species of frog in the family Rhacophoridae. It is endemic to Vietnam and possibly nearby parts of Laos.

Scientists observed this frog in karst forest. People have seen this frog between 1000 and 1200 meters above sea level.

The adult male frog measures 32.2–33.1 mm in snout-vent length and the adult female frog 37.6–39.3 mm. There is more webbed skin on the hind feet than on the front feet. The skin of the dorsum is moss-green in color. There is a green mark in the shape of the letter Y on the back.

Scientists named this frog for Doctor Truong Quang Nguyen, a scientist from the Vietnam Academy of Science and Technology's Institute of Ecology and Biological Resources who has contributed to the study of amphibians in this part of southeast Asia.
