= Rohanixalus punctatus =

Conservation status
- Data Deficient (IUCN 3.1)

Scientific classification
- Kingdom: Animalia
- Phylum: Chordata
- Class: Amphibia
- Order: Anura
- Family: Rhacophoridae
- Genus: Rohanixalus
- Species: R. punctatus

Binomial name
- Rohanixalus punctatus (Wilkinson, Win, Thin, Lwin, Shein & Tun, 2003)

Synonyms
- Chiromantis punctatus (Wilkinson, Win, Thin, Lwin, Shein & Tun, 2003); Chirixalus punctatus Wilkinson, Win, Thin, Lwin, Shein & Tun, 2003

Species of frog

Rohanixalus punctatus is a species of frog in the family Rhacophoridae. It is endemic to Myanmar.

== Taxonomy and systematics ==
It was given the common name of Myanmar spotted treefrog when it was first described in 2003 on the basis of an adult male frog collected at the headquarters of the Rakhine Yoma Elephant Range. Formerly described in Chirixalus, it was moved to the new genus Rohanixalus in 2020 following a phylogenetic study.

== Description ==
The Myanmar spotted treefrog is light brown in colour with dark spots on head, back and legs. Its head is round with a pointed, elevated snout and slightly protuberant nostrils. Its vocal sac is external, and it does not have vomerine teeth. Its fingers are opposable and the third finger is the longest and has the largest disk. The webbing between the third and fourth fingers is short, and absent between the other fingers. Males are smaller than females. The snout-to-vent-length of 21 male specimens ranges from 21.5 to 25 mm (0.85 to 0.98 in) and of six female specimens from 24.7 to 28.4 mm (0.97 to 1.12 in).

== Habitat and ecology ==
Individuals were found in disturbed habitat between mountain evergreen forests and agricultural land, 1–2 m above the ground in bushes. This species may be restricted to remaining secondary habitat in Rakhine as remnant populations, or (as with Chirixalus species in Myanmar) they might prefer degraded habitats. The male frog perches on plants 1–2 m above water and calls to the female frogs. The female frog deposits her eggs in foam nests on leaves over water. Scientists have observed oviposition on plants of the genus Arum. The larvae presumably develop in the water but are not reported to have been observed.

The IUCN classifies this frog as data deficient, in part due to its limited known range. This range includes one protected park: Rakhine Yoma Elephant Sanctuary.
