= Gracixalus supercornutus =

Conservation status
- Near Threatened (IUCN 3.1)

Scientific classification
- Kingdom: Animalia
- Phylum: Chordata
- Class: Amphibia
- Order: Anura
- Family: Rhacophoridae
- Genus: Gracixalus
- Species: G. supercornutus

Binomial name
- Gracixalus supercornutus (Orlov, Ho, and Nguyen, 2004)

Synonyms
- Philautus supercornutus Orlov, Ho, and Nguyen, 2004; Aquixalus supercornutus (Orlov, Ho, and Nguyen, 2004)

Species of amphibian

Gracixalus supercornutus, also known as the tiny bubble-nest frog, is a species of shrub frog, family Rhacophoridae. It is found in central Vietnam and southern Laos. It is found in montane evergreen forests at elevations of 1,100–1,905 m (3,609–6,250 ft) above sea level. Individuals have been observed on leaves and branches of low-lying vegetation above shallow, non-flowing water bodies, typically near streams but also in a large swamp. Females deposit small clutches of eggs (5–8) on top of leaf surfaces. Males may guard the eggs.

Gracixalus supercornutus is threatened by habitat loss caused by expanding human settlements, shifting and small scale agriculture, logging, and roads. It occurs in several protected areas.
