= Liuixalus shiwandashan =

Conservation status
- Data Deficient (IUCN 3.1)

Scientific classification
- Kingdom: Animalia
- Phylum: Chordata
- Class: Amphibia
- Order: Anura
- Family: Rhacophoridae
- Genus: Liuixalus
- Species: L. shiwandashan

Binomial name
- Liuixalus shiwandashan Li, Mo, Jiang, Xie, and Jiang, 2015

Synonyms
- Romerus shiwandashan Dubois, Ohler, and Pyron, 2021

Species of frog

Liuixalus shiwandashan is a species of frog in the family Rhacophoridae. It is endemic to China. It has been observed in exactly one place: Mount Shiwanda in Guanxi Province, 937 meters above sea level.

== Habitat ==
This frog lives in forest habitats and breeds by larval development in water-filled holes and seepage areas in the forest floor.

== Status and threats ==
The IUCN classifies this frog as data deficient and notes that tourism in Shiwandashan National Park may disturb the frog's breeding habitats.

== Original publication ==
- Li; Mo; Jiang; Xie; Jiang; Qin S; Mo Y; Jiang K; Cai B; Xie F; et al. (2015). "Two New Species of Liuixalus (Rhacophoridae, Anura): Evidence from Morphological and Molecular Analyses". PLOS ONE. 10 (8) e0136134. doi:10.1371/journal.pone.0136134. PMC 4548945. PMID 26305377.
