= Rohanixalus baladika =

Conservation status
- Near Threatened (IUCN 3.1)

Scientific classification
- Kingdom: Animalia
- Phylum: Chordata
- Class: Amphibia
- Order: Anura
- Family: Rhacophoridae
- Genus: Rohanixalus
- Species: R. baladika

Binomial name
- Rohanixalus baladika (Riyanto and Kurniati, 2014)

Synonyms
- Chiromantis baladika Riyanto and Kurniati, 2014; Chirixalus baladika (Riyanto and Kurniati, 2014); Feihyla baladika (Riyanto and Kurniati, 2014)

Species of amphibian endemic to Indonesia

Rohanixalus baladika, the Sumatran bubble-nest frog, is a species of frog in the family Rhacophoridae. It is endemic to Indonesia.

== Habitat ==
This frog has been observed in submontane forests between 200 and 300 meters above sea level. Scientists infer that this frog has some tolerance to disturbed habitats because they found some specimens on a palm oil plantation.

The frog's known range includes one protected park: Rimbo Panti Nature Reserve.

== Reproduction ==
The female frog lays eggs on leaves. Scientists infer that this frog breeds through larval development.

== Threats ==
The IUCN classifies this frog as near threatened. Principal threats include habitat loss in favor of agriculture, specifically palm oil cultivation and water pollution from associated fertilizers.
