= Rohanixalus hansenae =

Conservation status
- Least Concern (IUCN 3.1)

Scientific classification
- Kingdom: Animalia
- Phylum: Chordata
- Class: Amphibia
- Order: Anura
- Family: Rhacophoridae
- Genus: Rohanixalus
- Species: R. hansenae

Binomial name
- Rohanixalus hansenae (Cochran, 1927)

Synonyms
- Philautus hansenae Cochran, 1927; Rhacophorus (Chirixalus) hansenae (Cochran, 1927); Chirixalus hansenae (Cochran, 1927); Chiromantis hansenae (Cochran, 1927); Feihyla hansenae Dubois, Ohler, and Pyron, 2021

Species of frog

Rohanixalus hansenae, also known as Hansen's Asian treefrog, Hansen's bushfrog, and Chon Buri pigmy tree frog, is a species of frog in the family Rhacophoridae. As its range is currently known, it is endemic to Thailand, although it is likely that its true range extends into Myanmar, Cambodia, and Laos. The nominal species consists of two lineages that may represent distinct species. The specific name hansenae honours Dora Hansen, friend of Doris Mable Cochran who described this species. Formerly described in Feihyla, it was moved to the new genus Rohanixalus in 2020 following a phylogenetic study.

== Habitat ==
Rohanixalus hansenae occurs in association with riparian vegetation around ponds in lowland forest and up to around 1,000 m (3,300 ft) above sea level.

== Reproduction and young ==
Reproduction occurs in the rainy season. Egg clutches are deposited on vertical surfaces of boulders and plants above water, occasionally away from water in areas that get subsequently flooded. The female frog guards the clutch after laying. Scientists have observed mother frogs jumping on grasshoppers that presumably wish to eat the eggs.

The tadpoles have been found to hatch early if the area floods. Eggs that do not hatch early perish in floods.

== Threats ==
This species is probably threatened by habitat loss (deforestation) occurring in its distribution area. It is present in a number of protected areas, for example Khao Kitchakut National Park and Sakaerat Environmental Research Station.
