= Jerdon's tree frog =

Jerdon's tree frog can refer to two distinct species of frogs:

- Hyla annectans in the family Hylidae
- Nasutixalus jerdonii in the family Rhacophoridae
