= Gracixalus jinggangensis =

Conservation status
- Critically Endangered (IUCN 3.1)

Scientific classification
- Kingdom: Animalia
- Phylum: Chordata
- Class: Amphibia
- Order: Anura
- Family: Rhacophoridae
- Genus: Gracixalus
- Species: G. jinggangensis

Binomial name
- Gracixalus jinggangensis Zeng, Zhao, Chen, Chen, Zhang, and Wang, 2017

Species of frog

Gracixalus jinggangensis, the Jinggang tree frog, is a species of frog in the family Rhacophoridae. It is endemic to China, where it has been observed on Mount Jinggan in Jiangxi Province.

The adult male frog measures about 27.9–33.8 mm in snout-vent length and a single female specimen was found to measure 31.6 mm. The skin of the frog's back, head, and the upper sides of the limbs has noticeable tubercles. The is a mark in the shape of the letter Y that goes from the intraorbital region to the middle of the back.

This frog lives in montane bamboo forests between 1100 and 1340 meters above sea level. This frog has shown very little tolerance to habitat disturbance. The female frog lays eggs in water-containing holes in bamboo plants.

Scientists classify this frog as critically endangered because of its small range, which is subject to disturbance, such as the collection of bamboo for human use. Scientists believe that some harvesting might not endanger this frog further if carefully managed. This frog's range includes at least one protected park: Taoyuandong National Nature Reserve.
