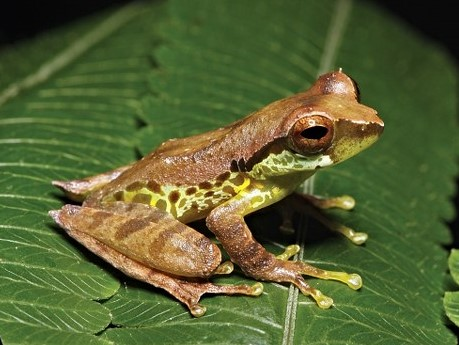

Conservation status
- Least Concern (IUCN 3.1)

Scientific classification
- Kingdom: Animalia
- Phylum: Chordata
- Class: Amphibia
- Order: Anura
- Family: Rhacophoridae
- Genus: Gracixalus
- Species: G. quangi

Binomial name
- Gracixalus quangi Rowley, Dau, Nguyen, Cao, and Nguyen, 2011

= Gracixalus quangi =

Species of amphibian

Gracixalus quangi is a species of bush frog endemic to Vietnam, Laos, and China, where it has been observed between 550 and 1300 meters above sea level.

== Appearance ==
This frog is smaller than most rhacophorids. The adult male measures 21.4–24.5 mm in snout-vent length and the adult female 26.8–27.3 mm. The frog's body is flat in shape with a triangular snout. The feet have disks on the toes for climbing. Only the hind feet are webbed. The skin of the dorsum is translucent dark green in color with some opaque yellow on the legs. There is some translucent light green on the legs. There are brown spots on the sides of the body and ventral surfaces of the hind legs. There is a dark brown intraorbital mark behind the eyelids. There is turquoise blue coloration on the supratympanic fold. The webbed skin is black in color. The iris of the eye is bronze in color with black reticulations.

== Habitat and threats ==
This frog lives in lowland and montaine rainforests. The female lays eggs on plants over muddy water. The eggs are cream-colored and covered in gel. When the eggs hatch, the tadpoles fall into the water.

Scientists believe this frog is at least concern of extinction, but it does face some threat from habitat loss associated with human habitation, farming, and logging. Its range includes at least one protected park: Pu Hoat Proposed Nature Reserve in Vietnam, and it is suspected in Xuan Lien Nature Reserve and Pu Huong Nature Reserve in Laos.

== Original publication ==
- Rowley JJL; Dau VQ; Nguyen TT; Cao TT; Nguyen SV (2011). "A new species of Gracixalus (Anura: Rhacophoridae) with a hyperextended vocal repertoire from Vietnam". Zootaxa. 3125: 22–38. doi:10.11646/zootaxa.3125.1.2.
