= Nasutixalus yingjiangensis =

Conservation status
- Endangered (IUCN 3.1)

Scientific classification
- Kingdom: Animalia
- Phylum: Chordata
- Class: Amphibia
- Order: Anura
- Family: Rhacophoridae
- Genus: Nasutixalus
- Species: N. yingjiangensis

Binomial name
- Nasutixalus yingjiangensis Yang and Chan, 2018

Species of frog

Nasutixalus yingjiangensis, the Yingjiang ridge-nosed tree frog or Yingjiang tree-hole frog, is a species of frog in the family Rhacophoridae. It is endemic to Yunnan, in China, though scientists suspect it may also live in Myanmar. It has been observed 1610 meters above sea level.

This arboreal frog lives in the forest canopy.

Scientists classify this frog as endangered because of its small range: 129 square kilometers in an area that humans continue to degrade, usually for logging. However, scientists believe it may live in other locations where it has not yet been formally recorded.

== Original description ==
- Yang J-H; Chan B P-L (2018). "A new phytotelm-breeding treefrog of the genus Nasutixalus (Rhacophoridae) from western Yunnan of China". Zootaxa. 4388: 191–206.
