= Rohanixalus shyamrupus =

Conservation status
- Least Concern (IUCN 3.1)

Scientific classification
- Kingdom: Animalia
- Phylum: Chordata
- Class: Amphibia
- Order: Anura
- Family: Rhacophoridae
- Genus: Rohanixalus
- Species: R. shyamrupus

Binomial name
- Rohanixalus shyamrupus (Chandra & Ghosh, 1989)

Synonyms
- Chirixalus shyamrupus Chanda and Ghosh, 1989; Chiromantis shyamrupus (Chanda and Ghosh, 1989)

Species of frog

Rohanixalus shyamrupus, also known as the hornbill bubble-nest frog and Shyamrup's bush frog, is a species of frog in the family Rhacophoridae endemic to north-eastern India: it is only known from the type locality, Namdapha Tiger Reserve in Arunachal Pradesh.

== Taxonomy ==
Formerly described in Chirixalus, it was moved to the new genus Rohanixalus in 2020 following a phylogenetic study.

== Habitat ==
This frog lives in forests, where it is principally seen near the edges. It has also been observed on plantations, in secondary forest, and near human habitation. It does not appear to need complete closed canopy but it does require shrub and lower plant cover. This frog has been observed between 200 and 1600 meters above sea level.

The frog's range includes at least one protected park: Namdapha National Park. Scientists think it could also live in Pakke Tiger Reserve.

== Young ==
This frog lays eggs on plants in marshland near water, both flowing and stagnant. The female frog makes a foam nest overhanging the water. Scientists believe this species breeds in May because that is when the male frogs can be heard calling.

== Threats ==
The IUCN classifies this species as least concern of extinction. What danger it faces comes from habitat loss and fragmentation associated with the construction of roads and towns, hydroelectric dam projects, and pollution associated with pesticides and other chemicals. Vehicle disturbance may also be an issue.

== Original description ==
- Chanda, S. K.; A. K. Ghosh. (1989). "A new frog of the genus Philautus Gistel, from the proposed Namdapha Biosphere Reserve, Arunachal Pradesh, northeast India". Journal of the Bombay Natural History Society. 86: 215–217.
