= Liuixalus calcarius =

Conservation status
- Endangered (IUCN 3.1)

Scientific classification
- Kingdom: Animalia
- Phylum: Chordata
- Class: Amphibia
- Order: Anura
- Family: Rhacophoridae
- Genus: Liuixalus
- Species: L. calcarius

Binomial name
- Liuixalus calcarius Milto, Poyarkov, Orlov, and Nguyen, 2013

Synonyms
- Liuixalus catbaensis Nguyen, Matsui, and Yoshikawa, 2014; Romerus calcarius Dubois, Ohler, and Pyron, 2021

Species of frog

Liuixalus calcarius, the limestone small tree frog, is a species of frog in the family Rhacophoridae. It is endemic to Vietnam, where it was found in Hai Phong Province. It lives in tropical primary forest habitats rich in karst rock.

== Description ==
The skin of the dorsum is red-brown in color with an X-shaped mark on the shoulder. This frog has disks on its toes for climbing. The pupil of the eye is horizontal.

== Etymology ==
Scientists named this frog calcarius for the Latin language word for "limestone." The frog's habitat is rich in karst rock.

== Habitat ==
This frog has been observed between 15 and 45 meters above sea level on Cat Ba Island. The frog has been found near pools of water in the karst rock and in small, temporary lakes that dry up for part of the year.

Cat Ba Island is in Cat Ba National Park, and scientists believe the frog's range to be larger than this place alone.

== Reproduction ==
Scientists have heard the male frogs calling in April but know little else about this species' reproductive biology. They infer that it breeds through larval development, like its congeners.

== Threats ==
The IUCN classifies this frog as endangered. Scientists believe it to be forest-dependent, which would make it threatened by deforestation associated with agriculture and logging.
