= Gracixalus jinxiuensis =

Conservation status
- Data Deficient (IUCN 3.1)

Scientific classification
- Kingdom: Animalia
- Phylum: Chordata
- Class: Amphibia
- Order: Anura
- Family: Rhacophoridae
- Genus: Gracixalus
- Species: G. jinxiuensis

Binomial name
- Gracixalus jinxiuensis (Hu, 1978)

Synonyms
- Philautus jinxiuensis Hu in Hu, Fei, and Ye, 1978; Philautus (Philautus) jinxiuensis Bossuyt and Dubois, 2001; Philautus jingxiuensis Orlov, Ho, and Nguyen, 2004; Gracixalus jinxiuensis Yu, Rao, Zhang, and Yang, 2009; Aquixalus jinxiuensis Fei, Hu, Ye, and Huang, 2009; Orixalus jinxiuensis Dubois, Ohler, and Pyron, 2021

Species of amphibian

Gracixalus jinxiuensis, commonly known as the Jinxiu bubble-nest frog or Jinxiu small treefrog, is a species of shrub frog from northern Vietnam and southern China (southeastern Yunnan, northeastern Guangxi and southern Hunan). "Jinxiu" in its names refers to the Jinxiu Yao Autonomous County, where its type locality lies. This species in known from forests, montane forests, secondary growth, forest edges, and from near streams.

== Cryptic species ==
Gracixalus jinxiuensis, as currently defined, may in fact include more than one species. Furthermore, it is possible that some records refer to other, established Gracixalus species. For instance, Gracixalus quyeti from Quảng Bình Province was formerly assigned to Gracixalus jinxiuensis.

== Morphology ==
The male snout–vent length is 23.5 mm (0.93 in) and the female is 29 mm (1.1 in).
