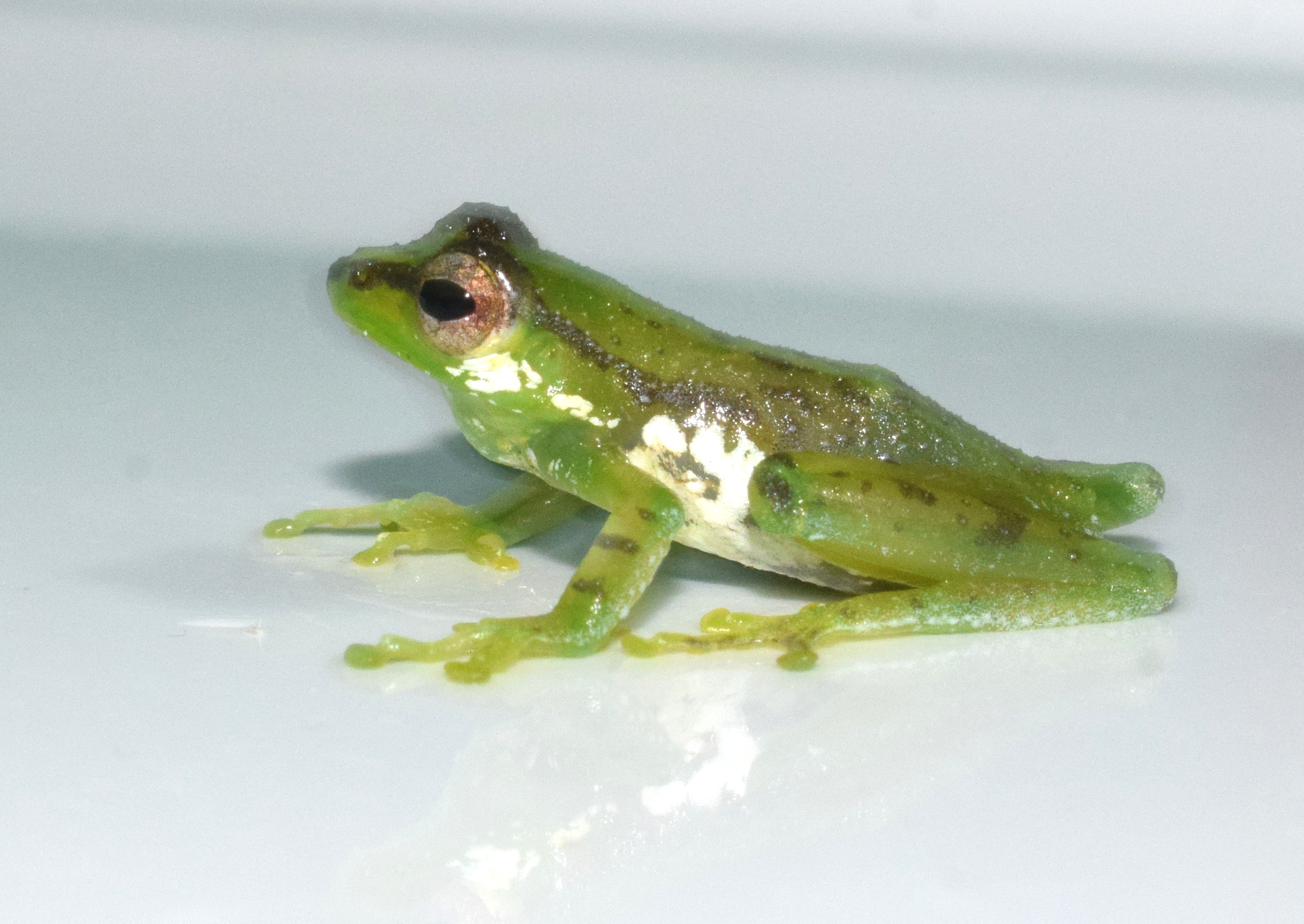

Scientific classification
- Kingdom: Animalia
- Phylum: Chordata
- Class: Amphibia
- Order: Anura
- Family: Rhacophoridae
- Genus: Gracixalus
- Species: G. patkaiensis

Binomial name
- Gracixalus patkaiensis Boruah, Deepak, Patel, Jithin, Yomcha & Das, 2023

= Patkai green tree frog =

Small tree frog native to Arunachal Pradesh, India

The Patkai green tree frog (Gracixalus patkaiensis) is a small tree frog native to Arunachal Pradesh, India.

== Description ==
In the Vertebrate Zoology paper that was written on the frog, it is stated that it was around 23.6–26.5 mm (0.93–1.04 in) in length. It also has a green dorsum with irregular brown spots. Other features of the frog include a dark streak along the back, and white marks on the sides of its body. It was noted that it had a slender physique with a long head.

== Behavior ==
=== Mating ===
Though there is little information on the mating season of the Patkai green tree frog, it is known that its mating call supposedly sounds like that of insects.

== Discovery ==
The frog was discovered by Indian and German researchers (B. Boruah, V. Deepak, N.G. Patel, V. Jithin, T. Yomcha, and A. Das, respectively), while they were on a herpetological expedition in Namdapha Tiger Reserve in Arunachal Pradesh. The frog is the first of the genus Gracixalus to be found in India.

=== Etymology ===
The frog was named after the Patkai hills that run along the Indo-Myanmar border.
