= Small frog (disambiguation) =

The small frog is a species of frog in the family Hylidae endemic to Australia.

Small frog may also refer to:

- Palebrown small frog, a frog native to Bangladesh, India, Myanmar, and Thailand
- Small dainty frog, a frog found in Eswatini, Lesotho and South Africa
- Small disked frog, a frog endemic to the Philippines
- Small torrent frog, a frog found in the Western Ghats of India

== See also ==
- Small treefrog (disambiguation)
- Small-headed frog
