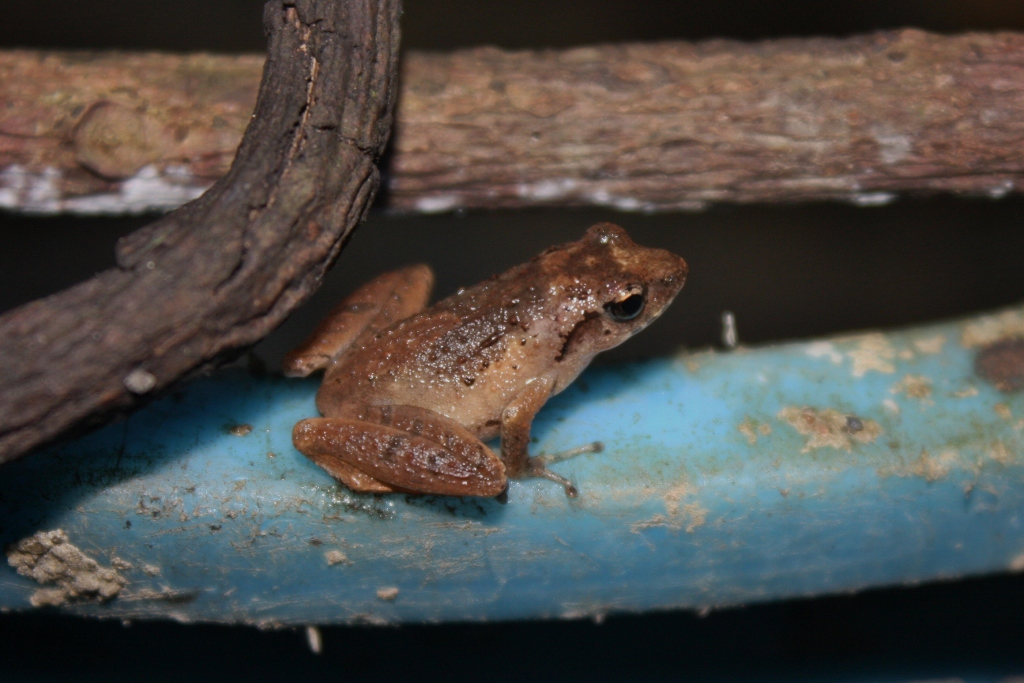

Conservation status
- Endangered (IUCN 3.1)

Scientific classification
- Kingdom: Animalia
- Phylum: Chordata
- Class: Amphibia
- Order: Anura
- Family: Rhacophoridae
- Genus: Liuixalus
- Species: L. romeri

Binomial name
- Liuixalus romeri (Smith, 1953)

Synonyms
- Philautus romeri Smith, 1953; Chirixalus romeri (Smith, 1953); Chiromantis romeri (Smith, 1953); Aquixalus romeri (Smith, 1953) Romerus romeri Dubois, Ohler & Pyron, 2021

= Romer's tree frog =

Species of amphibian

Romer's tree frog (Liuixalus romeri) is a species of frog native to Hong Kong and a small portion of Guangxi, China. With an average snout-vent length of 1.5 – 2.5 cm, it is the smallest amphibian recorded in the territory. Despite its common name, it belongs to the family Rhacophoridae, instead of the Hylidae.

It is named for John Dudley Romer.

== Description ==
The female frog is slightly larger than the male. The body is tan brown, with the underside white. An X-like marking, made up of two crooked black lines, can be seen on the dorsum. Sometimes, the lines do not meet medially, thus leading to a chevron marking posteriorly. Underneath the X-like marking lies another upside-down V-like marking. The skin is peppered with fine granules. A distinct fold extends from the eye to the foreleg.

Romer's tree frog has a triangular but blunt snout with brown-spotted lips. Between the eyes is a dark bar, which extends to the eyelids. The hind legs are long, slender, and barred with irregular brown-to-black cross-bands. All digits have small toe pads, which allow the frog to hang on tree branches or leaves.

== Ecology and behaviour ==
The habitat of the frog is well-wooded areas near small streams or other water sources suitable for breeding. This frog usually sits on low bushes, buries itself in fallen leaves, or rests on bare ground. The frog has been recorded solely from four of the outlying islands in Hong Kong, namely Lantau Island, Lamma Island, Po Toi Island and Chek Lap Kok. In 2007, the species was also reported from Guangxi, China, far from the Hong Kong population.

Its tadpoles and eggs are susceptible to predation by the introduced mosquitofish, and it is only able to breed in places where the fish has yet to colonise. The frog breeds in shallow water from early March to September. The male has a shrill, staccato call. The female glues up to 120 eggs onto submerged plant debris, stones, or vegetation. The tadpoles, brown in colour, require 4 to 6 weeks to metamorphose in captivity.

Adults feed on termites, and such small insects as crickets and arachnids such as spiders. The frog is strictly nocturnal. It lives about three years in the wild, but the female is reproductively active only for two breeding seasons.

== Discovery and conservation ==
Romer's tree frog was named after John Dudley Romer, who first discovered it in a cave on Lamma Island in 1952. That population disappeared in 1953 due to the collapse of the cave. Once thought to be extinct, the frog was rediscovered on the island in 1984.

Over 200 individuals of the species were rescued from Chek Lap Kok in 1992, before the construction of the new Hong Kong International Airport. The captives were bred successfully and the offspring were released into eight selected sites in Hong Kong Island and New Territories. The frogs in seven of the sites survived. Surprisingly, a very small number of them also survived in Chek Lap Kok.

As an endangered species, Romer's tree frog is protected under the law of Hong Kong (Wild Animals Protection Ordinance, Cap. 170). Part of Ngong Ping in Lantau, a site that supports the largest population of the frog has been designated as a Site of Special Scientific Interest in May 1999.
