= Rohanixalus marginis =

Conservation status
- Data Deficient (IUCN 3.1)

Scientific classification
- Kingdom: Animalia
- Phylum: Chordata
- Class: Amphibia
- Order: Anura
- Family: Rhacophoridae
- Genus: Rohanixalus
- Species: R. marginis

Binomial name
- Rohanixalus marginis (Chan, Grismer, Anuar, Quah, Grismer, Wood, Muin, and Ahmad, 2011)

Synonyms
- Chiromantis marginis Chan, Grismer, Anuar, Quah, Grismer, Wood, Muin, and Ahmad, 2011; Chirixalus marginis (Chan, Grismer, Anuar, Quah, Grismer, Wood, Muin and Ahmad, 2011); Feihyla marginis (Chan, Grismer, Anuar, Quah, Grismer, Wood, Muin and Ahmad, 2011)

Species of frog

Rohanixalus marginis, the Malaysian bubble-nest frog, Malaccan bubble-nest tree frog, or marginal whipping frog, is a species of frog in the family Rhacophoridae. It is endemic to Malaysia, where it has been found in Perlis State Park. Scientists predict it might also live in Thailand.

Scientists observed this frog at night on low vegetation. They found the frogs near artificial bodies of water in a forest. This frog was observed 140 meters above sea level. Scientists believe this frog breeds through larval development, like other frogs in Rohanixalus.

== Original description ==
- Chan; Grismer; Anuar; Quah; Grismer; Wood; Muin; Ahmad (2011). "No title given". Russ. J. Herpetol. 18: 256.
