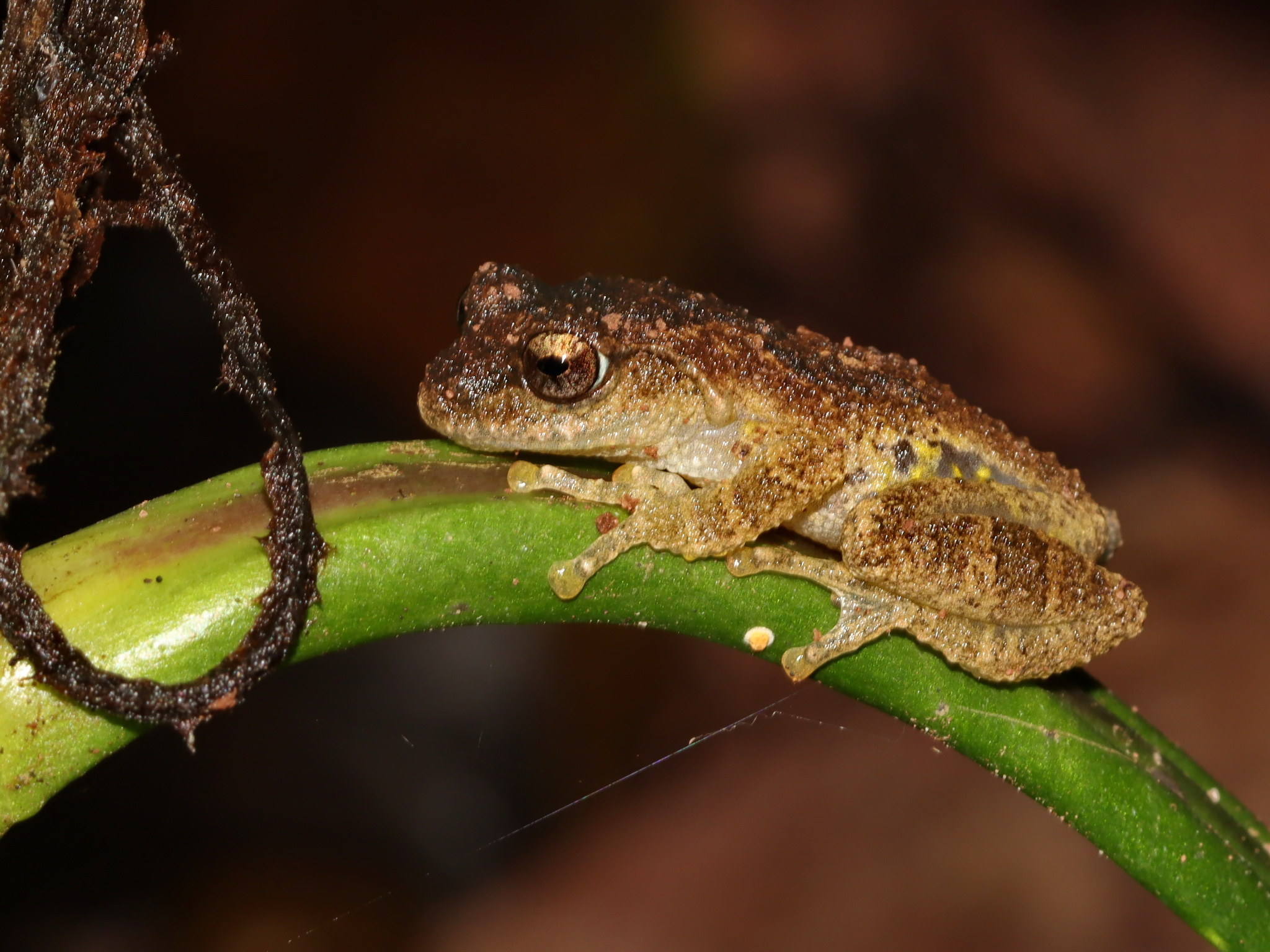

Conservation status
- Least Concern (IUCN 3.1)

Scientific classification
- Kingdom: Animalia
- Phylum: Chordata
- Class: Amphibia
- Order: Anura
- Family: Rhacophoridae
- Genus: Gracixalus
- Species: G. yunnanensis

Binomial name
- Gracixalus yunnanensis Yu, Li, Wang, Rao, Wu, and Yang, 2019

= Gracixalus yunnanensis =

Species of frog

Gracixalus yunnanensis, the Yunnan bush frog, is a species of frog in the family Rhacophoridae. It is native to Vietnam, Laos, Thailand, and China's Yunnan Province.

The adult male frog measures 26.0–34.2 mm (1.02–1.35 in) in snout-vent length. The skin of the dorsum is yellow-brown or red-brown in color. The iris is bronze in color. The male frog has a vocal sac and conical tubercles on its back.

This frog has been observed on vegetation in evergreen forests, where it has been observed between 1678 and 2166 meters above sea level. Scientists believe this frog lays eggs in pools, like its congeners.

Scientists classify this frog as being at least concern of extinction because of its large range. This range includes at least one protected park: Pu Mat National Park in Vietnam.
