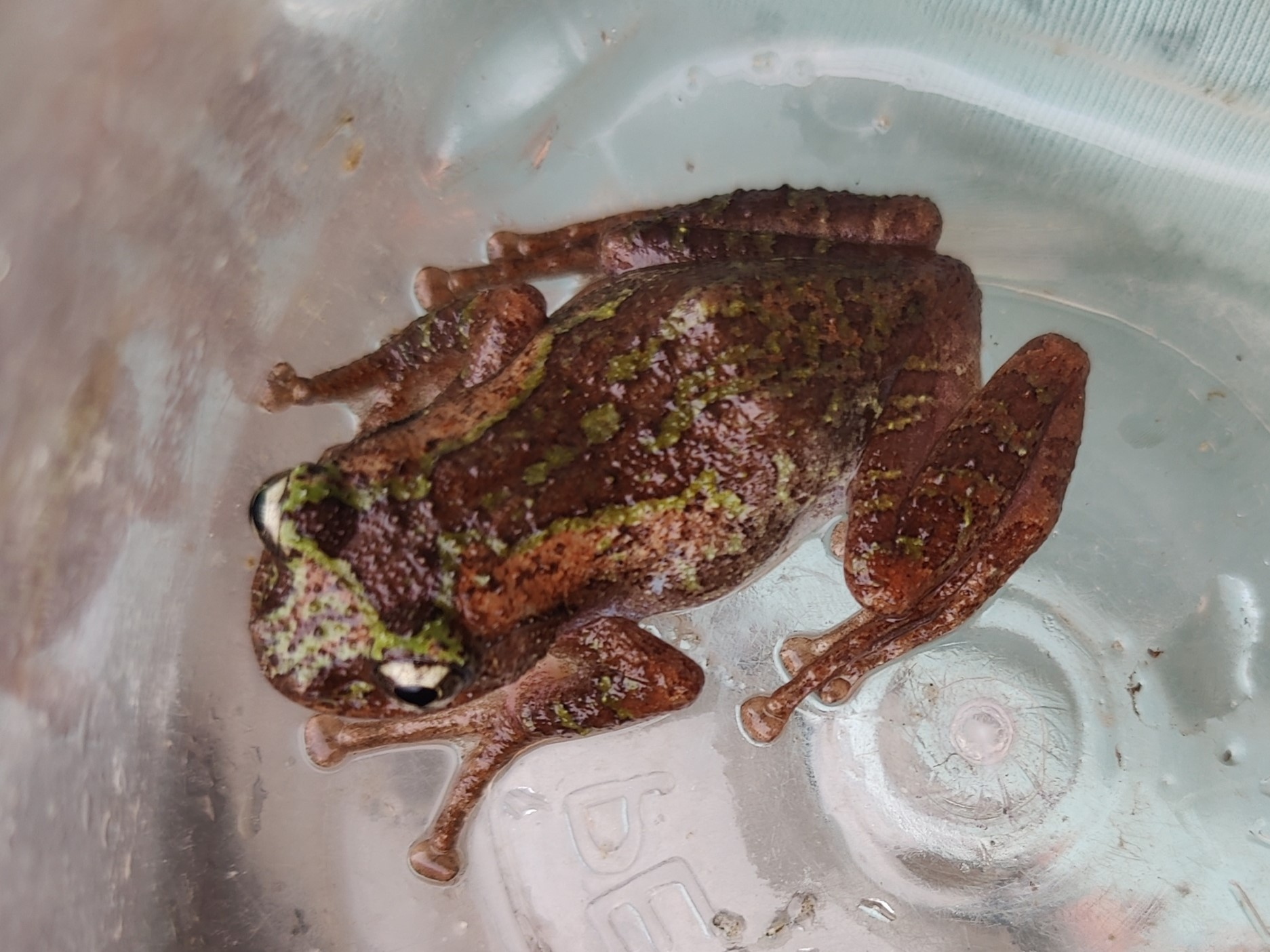

Conservation status
- Data Deficient (IUCN 3.1)

Scientific classification
- Kingdom: Animalia
- Phylum: Chordata
- Class: Amphibia
- Order: Anura
- Family: Rhacophoridae
- Genus: Nasutixalus
- Species: N. medogensis

Binomial name
- Nasutixalus medogensis Jiang, Wang, Yan, and Che, 2016

= Nasutixalus medogensis =

Species of frog

Nasutixalus medogensis, the Medog ridge-nosed tree frog, is a species of frog in the family Rhacophoridae. It has been found in China (Tibet) and north-eastern India (Arunachal Pradesh), where it has been observed 1619 meters above sea level.

This species lives the canopy of subtropical forests.

This species was first described to science in 2016.
