= Gracixalus ziegleri =

Scientific classification
- Kingdom: Animalia
- Phylum: Chordata
- Class: Amphibia
- Order: Anura
- Family: Rhacophoridae
- Genus: Gracixalus
- Species: G. ziegleri

Binomial name
- Gracixalus ziegleri Le, Do, Tran, Nguyen, Orlov, Ninh, and Nguyen, 2021

Species of frog

Gracixalus ziegleri, or Ziegler's tree frog, is a species of frog in the family Rhacophoridae. It is endemic to Vietnam. This frog has been observed 2200 meters above sea level.

This frog lives in montaine evergreen forests.

The adult frog measures 28.1 – 30.5 mm in snout-vent length. The skin of the dorsum is brown to light brown in color with a dark brown mark in the shape of the letter Y starting at the intraorbital region.
