= Ngengpui Wildlife Sanctuary =

Wildlife sanctuary in Lawngtlai district, Mizoram, India

- IUCN category IV (habitat/species management area)
- Location within Mizoram Location within India
- Interactive map of Ngengpui Wildlife Sanctuary
- Location: Lawngtlai district, Mizoram, India
- Nearest city: Lawngtlai
- Coordinates: 22°25′51″N 92°46′29″E
- Area: 110 km^{2} (42 sq mi)
- Established: 1991
- Governing body: Forest Department, Government of Mizoram

Ngengpui Wildlife Sanctuary is a wildlife sanctuary in the Lawngtlai district in the Indian state of Mizoram. The sanctuary covers about 110 km^{2} of largely undisturbed subtropical and semi-evergreen forest and lies near the borders with Bangladesh and Myanmar. Elevation in the sanctuary ranges from roughly 120–1,200 m above sea level depending on the source.

== History ==
Ngengpui Wildlife Sanctuary was officially constituted as a protected area by the Government of Mizoram through Notification No. B.12012/4/91-FST, issued under the provisions of the Wildlife (Protection) Act, 1972. The notification legally declared approximately 110 km^{2} of forest in southern Mizoram as a wildlife sanctuary, forming part of the state's protected area network.

== Geography and habitat ==
Ngengpui lies in south-west Mizoram. Vegetation types include sub-tropical evergreen and semi-evergreen forests with valley and montane forest communities; bamboo and dipterocarp elements are also reported in parts of the sanctuary. The Ngengpui River (from which the sanctuary takes its name) flows through parts of the protected area.

== Flora and fauna ==
Ngengpui supports a diversity of mammals, birds and herpetofauna typical of the Indo-Myanmar region. Fauna include gaur (Indian bison), sambar, barking deer, clouded leopard and several primate species. The sanctuary is also important for birdlife, including Bhutan peacock-pheasants, White-cheeked partridges, and Great Indian hornbills.

The sanctuary also has a small population of Indian elephant.

Recent taxonomic and news reports have noted the discovery of several new bent-toed gecko lineages in northeastern India; one lineage is reported from Ngengpui (referred to as the "Ngengpui" or "Nengpui" bent-toed gecko in coverage), underlining the sanctuary's herpetological importance. The sanctuary also houses the rare toad Bufoides meghalayanus. Another rare species found is Rohanixalus senapatiensis, commonly known as Senapti's tree frog.

== Threats ==
Threats commonly reported for protected areas in the region — and noted in regional biodiversity discussion — include shifting cultivation in surrounding areas, human-wildlife conflict (notably with elephants), and pressures from resource extraction and habitat fragmentation; continued monitoring and engagement with local communities has been recommended.

== Access and tourism ==
Ngengpui is mentioned in state tourism material and travel writing as a destination for wildlife viewing and birding; visitors should coordinate with Mizoram Forest Department offices and local authorities for permissions and guidance. The drier months (roughly October–April) are commonly listed as the preferred visiting season.

== See also ==
- Protected areas of India
- Tawi Wildlife Sanctuary
