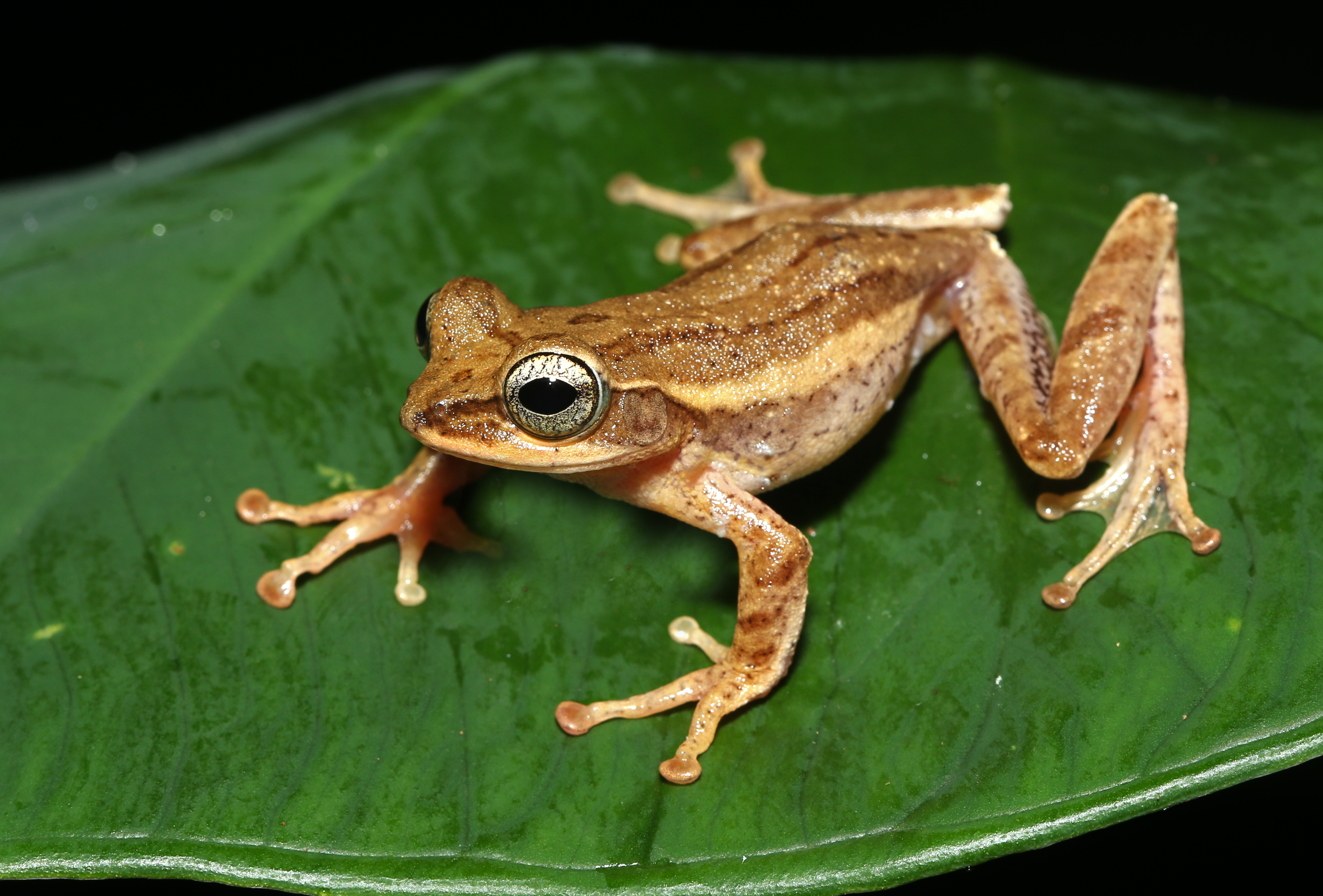

Scientific classification
- Kingdom: Animalia
- Phylum: Chordata
- Class: Amphibia
- Order: Anura
- Family: Rhacophoridae
- Subfamily: Rhacophorinae
- Genus: Beddomixalus; Abraham, Pyron, Ansil, Zachariah, and Zachariah, 2013
- Species: B. bijui

Binomial name
- Beddomixalus bijui (Zachariah, Dinesh, Radhakrishnan, Kunhikrishnan, Palot, and Vishnudas, 2011)

Synonyms
- Polypedates bijui Zachariah, Dinesh, Radhakrishnan, Kunhikrishnan, Palot, and Vishnudas, 2011

= Beddomixalus =

Beddomixalus bijui

Genus of amphibians

Beddomixalus is a monotypic genus of frogs in the family Rhacophoridae. The only described species, Beddomixalus bijui, is endemic to the Western Ghats, India. Its name is derived from a combination of the cognomen of Richard Henry Beddome, in honour of his work on the amphibian diversity of the Western Ghats, as well as Ixalus, which is often used as a suffix for names of rhacophorid genera.

== Description ==
Beddomixalus differs from the other rhacophorid genera by being a slender and elongated medium-sized frog, the female measuring up to 6.1 centimetres (2.4 in) in length; its yellowish-buff or reddish-brown dorsum carrying two distinct yellowish-cream longitudinal stripes; vomerine teeth and an absent lingual papilla; distinct supratympanic fold as well as tympanum; a rounded canthus rostralis; an obtusely concave loreal region; a simple and tubular Wolffian duct. At the same time, the early development of non-pigmented eggs occur exposed on moist swamp beds, without protection nor parental care; it has free-living aquatic tadpoles which are adapted to lentic conditions; and the genus inhabits mid- to high elevation forests.

=== Colour ===
==== Male ====
Its dorsum is of buff-brown colour with a dark stripe between the eyes; a dark stripe extends medially from its interorbital region to its vent. It possesses two light-coloured, yellowish-cream longitudinal stripes extending along its dorsolateral region, on either side of its body, which are bordered on the lower side by black dots; a broad dark band extends from below the snout along the tympanum as well, up to the middle of the animal's flank, where it morphs into a pale patch covered in vermiculations.

==== Female ====
It has a reddish- to orange-brown dorsum with similar dark and light bands and vermiculations as in the male, while its ventral surface is white.

=== Tadpoles ===
Tadpoles are small, exotrophic and nektonic. They are oval, depressed and dark pigmented from the snout to the tip of the tail, including their fins. The ventral side is pale pink and less pigmented. Eyes are reddish and of moderate size. The musculus interhyoideus and intestine are visible through the ventrum. Its naris is equidistant from its snout and eye. Its tail fin is moderate and rounded at the end. The lower jaw sheath is V-shaped.

Tadpoles of this species were observed with completely developed hindlimbs at stage 40, with a pale dorsolateral band appearing at stage 42. Its eyes are bright red and its body pigmentation is a greenish-yellow by stage 44, whilst metamorphs begin emerging on land. During stage 46, froglets are found on swamp vegetation.

== Behaviour ==
The type species is primarily arboreal, inhabiting trees in and around highland swamps or marshes. During early breeding season, males were observed to aggregate around optimal breeding locations in unfilled swamp beds. They begin migrating to these during the onset of pre-monsoon showers from surrounding forest. Most males rest on shrubs and bushes up to a height of about 2 metres (6.6 ft) and make a pulsating breeding chorus in unison. Air around these males is said to stink of "burnt rubber", similar to that felt around aggregating males of Hylarana malabarica. This odour is thought to be produced by glands on their dorsolateral margin. Males come down from their calling spots as night progresses and move on to grass patches in the swamp beds.

Amplexus is pectoral. Eggs are non-pigmented and semiterrestrial, with an average diameter of 3.2mm. They are scattered on moist soil or a grassy substrate. Total clutch size was observed as 175 eggs.

== Distribution ==
B. bijui is found in an elevation of between 1,100 to 1,600 metres (3,600 to 5,200 ft) above sea level in evergreen forests in the Eravikulam plateau.
