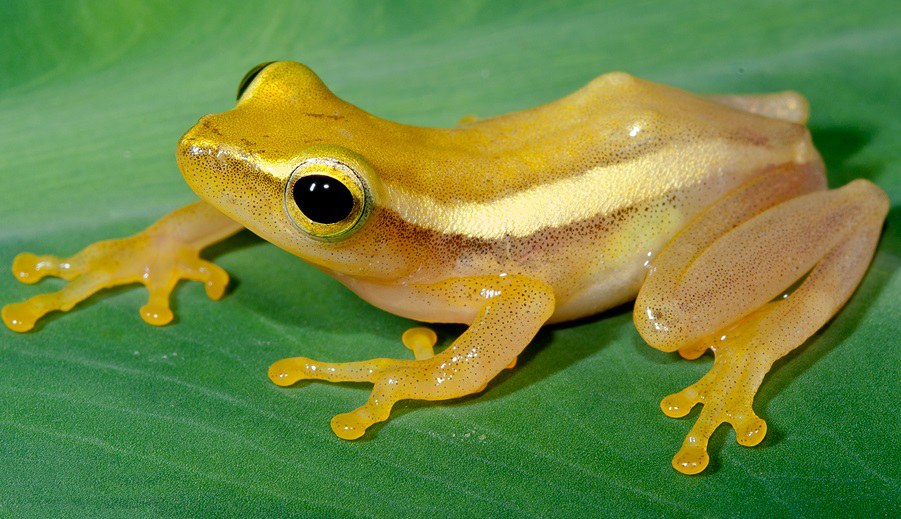
- Rohanixalus vittatus

Scientific classification
- Kingdom: Animalia
- Phylum: Chordata
- Class: Amphibia
- Order: Anura
- Family: Rhacophoridae
- Subfamily: Rhacophorinae
- Genus: Rohanixalus; Biju et al., 2020

Type species
- Ixalus vittatus Boulenger, 1887

Species
- 8 species (see text)

= Rohanixalus =

Genus of amphibians

Rohanixalus is a genus of tree frogs in the family Rhacophoridae native to the Andaman Islands and Indo-Burma region. The genus was established in 2020 by Indian herpetologist S.D. Biju of the University of Delhi and his colleagues. The genus comprises eight species.

== Etymology ==
The genus was named after Sri Lankan taxonomist Rohan Pethiyagoda, who is a prominent Ichthyologist responsible for the discovery and/or description of almost 100 new species of vertebrates from Sri Lanka, including fishes, amphibians and lizards, in addition to 43 species of freshwater crabs.

== Description ==
The species of the genus characterised by a small and slender body with a size about 2 to 3 cm (0.79 to 1.18 in) long. There is a pair of contrastingly colored lateral lines on either side of the body. Some minute brown speckles can be found scattered throughout the upper body surfaces. Females known to lay light greenish eggs in arboreal bubble-nests. Female mothers show maternal egg attendance where the mother attends the egg clutches until hatching and later assists in release of the tadpoles into the water.

== Distribution ==
The species are distributed throughout northeast, the Andaman Islands, Myanmar, Thailand, Malaysia, Indonesia, Vietnam, Laos, and Cambodia, up to southern China.

== Species ==
Species	Taxon author	Common name	Distribution	Ref.
Rohanixalus baladika	(Riyanto and Kurniati, 2014)	Sumatran Bubble-nest Frog	North Sumatra and West Sumatra Provinces, Indonesia	
Rohanixalus hansenae	(Cochran, 1927)	Hansen's Asian Treefrog	Thailand	
Rohanixalus marginis	(Chan et al, 2011)	Malaysian Bubble-nest Frog	Perlis State Park, Malaysia	
Rohanixalus nauli	(Riyanto and Kurniati, 2014)	Nauli Bubble-nest Frog	Teluk Nauli, Sibolga, Indonesia	
Rohanixalus punctatus	(Wilkinson, Win, Thin, Lwin, Shein, and Tun, 2003)	–	Southwestern foothills of Rakhine Yoma, Myanmar	
Rohanixalus senapatiensis	(Mathew and Sen, 2009)	Senapti's Bubble-nest Frog	northeastern India	
Rohanixalus shyamrupus	(Chanda and Ghosh, 1989)	Hornbill Bubble-nest Frog	Arunachal Pradesh, India	
Rohanixalus vittatus	(Boulenger, 1887)	Striped Bubble-nest frog	Myanmar, Thailand, and the Andaman Islands in India; records from elsewhere may be undescribed species	
