= Moss frog =

Moss frog may refer to:

- Arthroleptella, a genus of true frogs from southern Africa
- Rhacophoridae, a family of the Old World Tropics
- Moss froglet, Crinia nimbus
