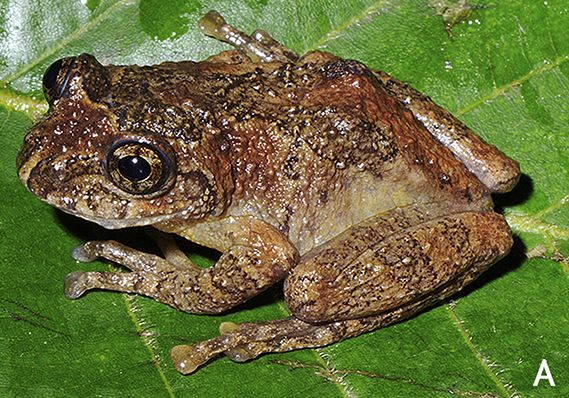
- Nasutixalus jerdonii

Scientific classification
- Kingdom: Animalia
- Phylum: Chordata
- Class: Amphibia
- Order: Anura
- Family: Rhacophoridae
- Subfamily: Rhacophorinae
- Genus: Nasutixalus; Jiang, Yan, Wang, and Che, 2016

Type species
- Nasutixalus medogensis Jiang, Yan, Wang, and Che, 2016

Synonyms
- Frankixalus Biju, Senevirathne, Garg, Mahony, Kamei, Thomas, Shouche, Raxworthy, Meegaskumbura, and Van Bocxlaer, 2016

= Nasutixalus =

Genus of Amphibia

Nasutixalus is a genus of frogs in the family Rhacophoridae. The genus is found in northeastern India and adjacent southeastern Tibet as well as western Yunnan (China); the range might extend into the adjacent Nepal and Myanmar. Common name ridged-nose treefrogs has been coined for this genus.

== Etymology ==
The name Nasutixalus is derived from the Latin nasutus meaning "large-nosed", and ixalus, which is a generic stem for treefrogs.

== Taxonomy ==
Nasutixalus was erected in 2016 to accommodate Nasutixalus medogensis. The species was described based on a single specimen. Molecular data suggested that this specimen represented a distinct lineage with the family Rhacophoridae, warranting recognition as a new genus. In a study published only two days later, Sathyabhama Das Biju and colleagues erected a new monotypic genus Frankixalus for Polypedates jerdonii; the name of the genus honours Franky Bossuyt from the Free University of Brussels. Because of the earlier publication date, priority is given to Nasutixalus, rendering Frankixalus synonymous.

A specimen first identified as Theloderma moloch was genetically distinct from other Theloderma and made the genus paraphyletic. Later analysis showed that Theloderma moloch collected near its type locality indeed cluster with other Theloderma, whereas the anomalous specimen belongs to the same lineage as Nasutixalus jerdonii and is now described as Nasutixalus medogensis.

== Species ==
There are three species:

- Nasutixalus jerdonii (Günther, 1876)
- Nasutixalus medogensis Jiang, Wang, Yan, and Che, 2016
- Nasutixalus yingjiangensis Yang and Chan, 2018

== Description ==
Nasutixalus are cryptic, medium-sized frogs: adult males measure 37–45 mm (1.5–1.8 in) and adult females 47–48 mm (1.9–1.9 in) in snout–vent length. Fingers have rudimentary webbing whereas the toes are moderately webbed.

== Habitat and reproduction ==
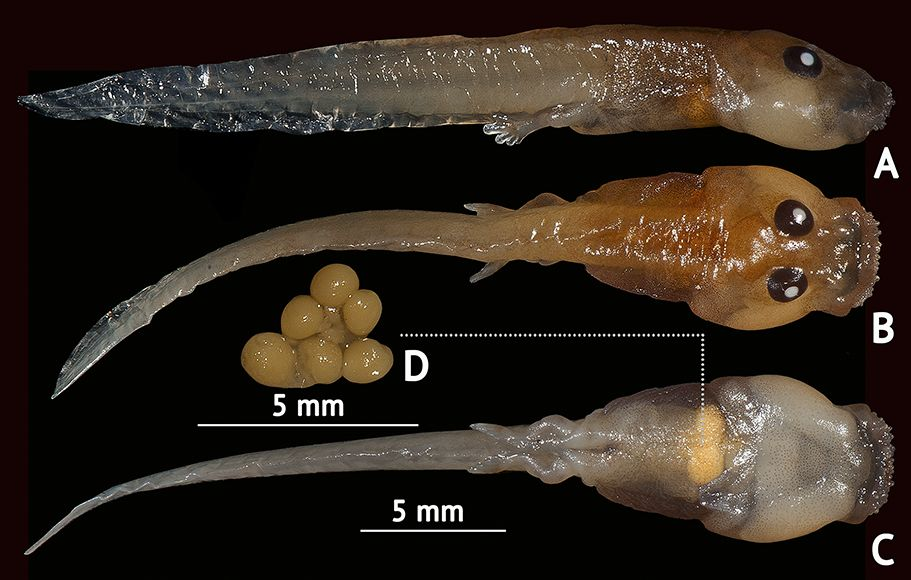
Tadpoles Nasutixalus jerdonii with ingested eggs

Nasutixalus are arboreal and live in montane evergreen forests. Male Nasutixalus jerdonii and N. yingjiangensis call from tree holes. Eggs of N. jerdonii have been found in water-filled tree holes, adhering on the inner walls slightly above the water surface. Tadpoles were found in water and had eggs in their stomachs, i.e., they are oophagous. Oophagy is considered an adaptation in phytotelm-breeding frogs for a nutrient-deficient environment. Whether the observed eggs were conspecific is not known, although circumstantial evidence suggests so.
