= Ngọc Linh =

Mountain in Vietnam

- Location within Vietnam

Highest point
- Elevation: 2,598 m (8,524 ft)
- Prominence: 2,208 m (7,244 ft)
- Listing: List of Ultras of Southeast Asia; Ribu
- Coordinates: 15°4′9″N 107°58′30″E

Geography
- Location: Vietnam
- Parent range: Annamite Range

Climbing
- First ascent: Unknown

Ngọc Linh (a Sino-Vietnamese name meaning "Jade Mountain") is a 2,598-metre-high (8,524 ft) (Note: or 2208) mountain of the Annamite Range in Vietnam.

== History ==
Its name Ngọc-linh liên-sơn (Ngoc-linh Mountains) was originated from Ngơl k'iàng or Ngơk kariàng in Jeh-Tariang language. It means "the great mountain".

It’s located in the centrally-governed cities of Da Nang and the province of Quảng Ngãi. It is considered "the roof of Southern Vietnam".

== Culture ==
Panax vietnamensis (Vietnamese: Sâm Ngọc Linh), a species of ginseng native to the South Central Coast and Central Highlands region of Vietnam first identified as a separate species in 1973, is especially common on and around mount Ngọc Linh.

The area of Ngọc Linh mountain is also the only known habitat of Gracixalus lumarius or thorny tree frog and of the similar Gracixalus trieng or Trieng tree frog.

== See also ==
- List of ultras of Southeast Asia
