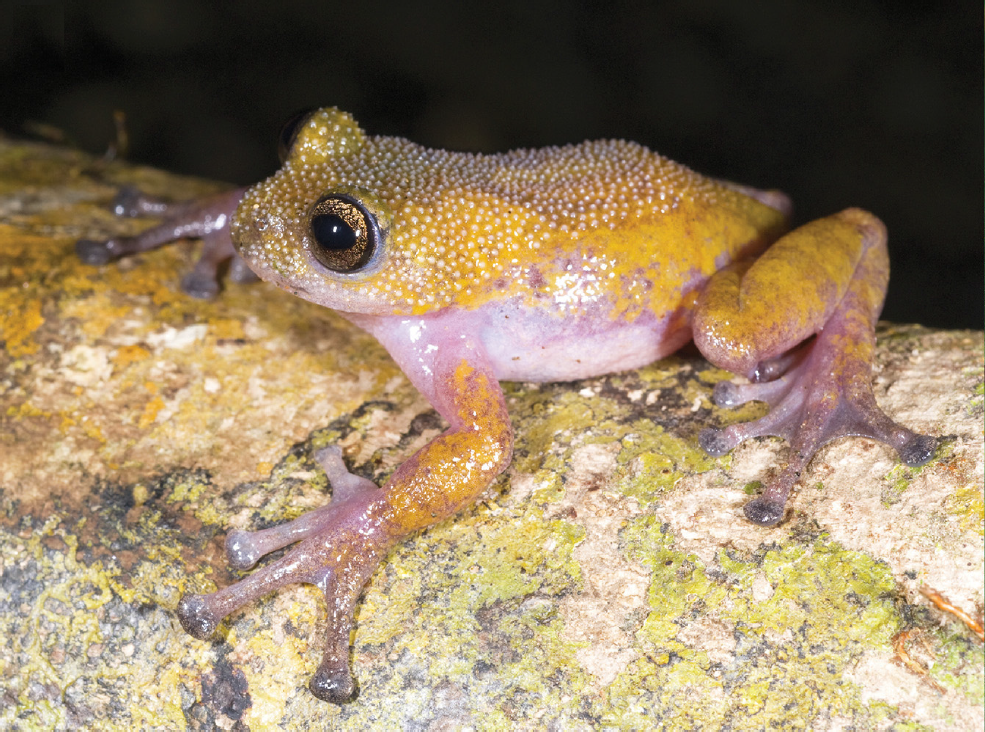

Conservation status
- Endangered (IUCN 3.1)

Scientific classification
- Kingdom: Animalia
- Phylum: Chordata
- Class: Amphibia
- Order: Anura
- Family: Rhacophoridae
- Genus: Gracixalus
- Species: G. lumarius

Binomial name
- Gracixalus lumarius Rowley et al., 2014

= Gracixalus lumarius =

Species of amphibian

Gracixalus lumarius, also known as the thorny tree frog or thorny bushfrog, is a species of rhacophorid frog. It is endemic to Vietnam and first known from Mount Ngoc Linh in Ngoc Linh Nature Reserve, Kon Tum Province. It has been observed between 1700 and 2160 meters above sea level.

== Appearance ==
The adult male frog measures 38.9–41.6 mm in snout-vent length and the adult female frog about 36.3 mm. When viewed from above, the head is wider than it is long and the snout is rounded. When viewed from the side, the lower jaw appears shorter than the upper, giving the frog the appearance of an underbite. The nostrils protrude slightly, and the supratympanic fold can be difficult to see. The frog has robust forelegs with large climbing disks on the front toes. The tympanum is not obvious. The male frog has conical, white tubercles on its body. These may become more prominent during the mating season.

Unlike most frogs in Gracixalus, this frog changes color. During the day, the skin of the dorsum is brown and at night it is yellow. There is also bright yellow coloration on the flanks. The ventrum and the throat are pink. The tips of the toes and the webbed skin on the feet are pink-gray in color. The iris of the eye is gold in color. Like other frogs in Gracixalus, it has black reticulations in its irises, but unlike other species, the black lines are even rather than irregular.

== Breeding habits ==
The female frog lays eggs on the inside walls of water-containing plants called phytotelma. The eggs have two layers of jelly on them to protect them. Scientists believe these frogs hatch into free-swimming tadpoles rather than froglets, but such tadpoles have not been observed as of reports from 2015. Scientists believe the frogs are obligate phytotelma breeders.

== Habitat and threats ==
Gracixalus lumarius is an arboreal frog that is associated with relatively undisturbed montane evergreen and bamboo forest at elevations of 1,845–2,160 m (6,053–7,087 ft) above sea level.

This frog is classified as endangered because of its small, threatened range. Humans cut down the forests in the frog's habitat to establish large farms for coffee, tea, rubber, and other cash crops. Mining, particularly gold mining, also damages the habitat. Scientists think that people might also catch the frog to sell as pets because of its color and beauty.

== Etymology ==
Lumarius is the Latin word for "of thorns," here a reference to the frog's distinctive white tubercles.
