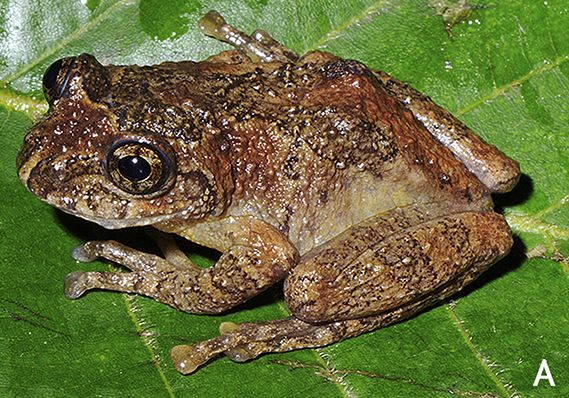

Conservation status
- Data Deficient (IUCN 3.1)

Scientific classification
- Kingdom: Animalia
- Phylum: Chordata
- Class: Amphibia
- Order: Anura
- Family: Rhacophoridae
- Genus: Nasutixalus
- Species: N. jerdonii

Binomial name
- Nasutixalus jerdonii (Günther, 1876)

Synonyms
- Polypedates jerdonii Günther, 1876 "1875"; Philautus jerdonii (Günther, 1876); Philautus jerdonii (Günther, 1876); Frankixalus jerdonii (Günther, 1876)

= Nasutixalus jerdonii =

Species of amphibian

Nasutixalus jerdonii is a species of frog in the family Rhacophoridae. It is found in the northeastern India, in the West Bengal, Nagaland, Manipur, and Meghalaya states. It range might extend into the adjacent Nepal. The specific name jerdonii honours Thomas C. Jerdon, an English herpetologist. Common names Jerdon's bubble-nest frog, Jerdon's tree frog, and Jerdon's bush frog have been coined for this species.

== Taxonomy ==
This species was first described as Polypedates jerdonii in 1876 by Albert Günther. Its subsequent placement has included various genera. In 2016, Sathyabhama Das Biju and colleagues erected a new monotypic genus for this species, Frankixalus; the name of the genus honours Franky Bossuyt from the Free University of Brussels. However, just two days earlier, Jiang and colleagues had erected the genus Nasutixalus to accommodate this species and another, new species. This gives priority to Nasutixalus.

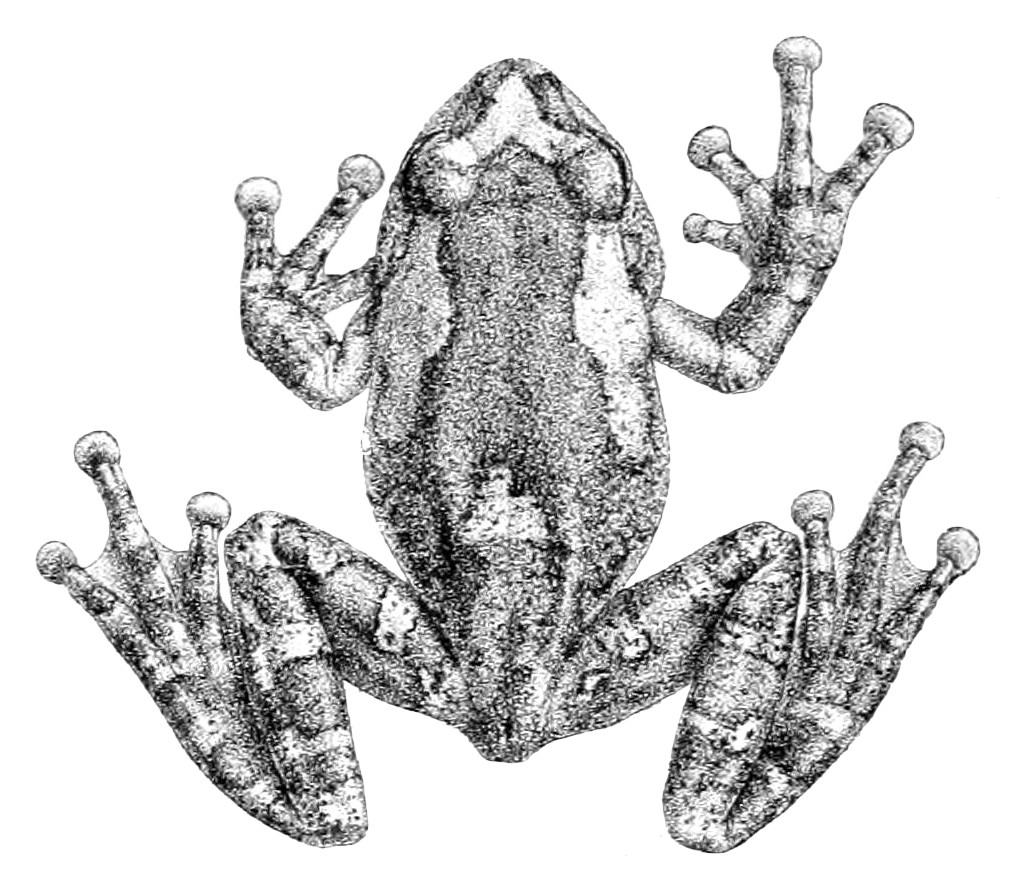
Illustration from George Albert Boulenger's Fauna of British India, including Ceylon and Burma

== Description ==
Adult males measure 37–42 mm (1.5–1.7 in) and adult females, based on a single specimen, 47 mm (1.9 in) in snout–vent length. The snout is rather truncate and not protruding. The fingers have basal webbing while the toes have moderate webbing. The dorsal colouration is reddish-brown to brownish-grey. Various markings are present, including an X-shaped brownish-black marking in many specimens. Males have a vocal sac.

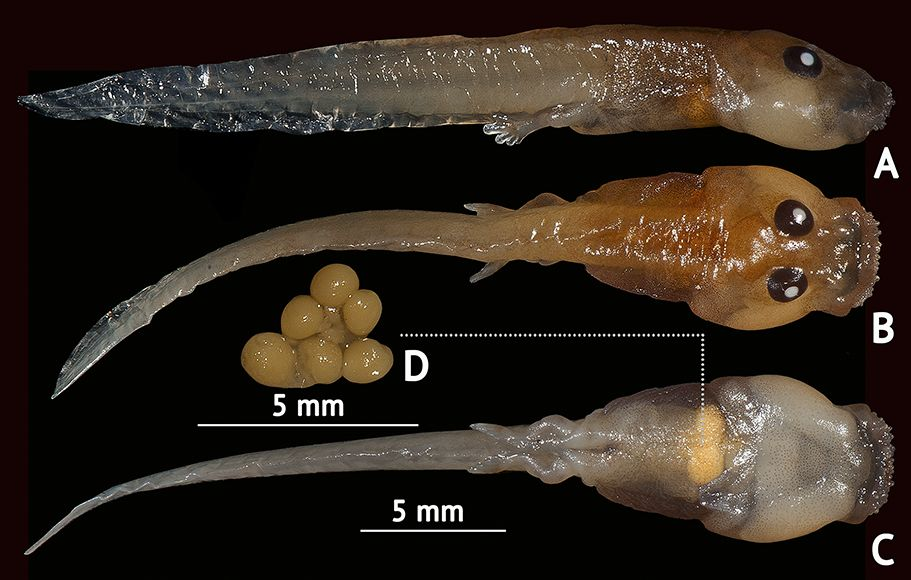
Tadpoles with ingested eggs

== Habitat and conservation ==
Nasutixalus jerdonii occurs in montane evergreen forests and secondary forests. It is an arboreal species. Males call from tree holes. The eggs are laid on the inner walls of water-filled hollows, and the tadpoles develop in water. They are oophagous.

This species was for a long time only known from the type series collected in 1870. However, populations were discovered in surveys conducted in 2007–2010. The species is threatened by habitat disturbance caused by slash-and-burn agriculture.
