= Gracixalus nonggangensis =

Conservation status
- Endangered (IUCN 3.1)

Scientific classification
- Kingdom: Animalia
- Phylum: Chordata
- Class: Amphibia
- Order: Anura
- Family: Rhacophoridae
- Genus: Gracixalus
- Species: G. nonggangensis

Binomial name
- Gracixalus nonggangensis Mo, Zhang, Luo, Zhou & Chen, 2013

Synonyms
- Gracixalus waza Nguyen et al., 2013

Species of amphibian

Gracixalus nonggangensis is a species of shrub frog found in southern Guangxi, China, and Cao Bang Province in northern Vietnam.

== Taxonomy and systematics ==
A population previously thought to be a separate species, as Gracixalus waza, was described from the Ha Lang District in northern Vietnam. This population was named for the World Association of Zoos and Aquariums (WAZA), to acknowledge their support of amphibian research and conservation in Vietnam and the common name Waza treefrog was suggested for it. As of 2020, scientists consider it a synonym of Gracixalus nonggangensis, and it was renamed Orixalus waza in 2021.

== Description ==
Gracixalus nonggangensis is a medium-sized species compared to others in its genus. Adult males measure 27–35 mm (1.1–1.4 in) in snout–vent length and females 34–38 mm (1.3–1.5 in). The snout is rounded, slightly protruding. The head is as wide or wider than it is long. The tympanum is distinct and rounded, and the canthus rostralis is rounded. The supratympanic fold is distinct. The forelimbs are relatively short. The fingers have no webbing but have well-developed discs at their tips. The toes are webbed. The toe discs are smaller than the finger discs. The skin is smooth except for some granularity behind the tympanum, flanks, belly, and the limbs. Dorsal coloration varies from light greenish brown to moss-green. There is a dark brown, blotched pattern between eyes that continues backwards as two bands (forming a Y-like mark), and a dark stripe in the middle of posterior part of dorsum. The limbs have some dark brown bands. The throat and chest are white with dark brown marbling, whereas the belly is immaculate white.

== Habitat and conservation ==
In Vietnam, Gracixalus nonggangensis seems to be associated with karst landscape. Specimens were found near cave entrances and in valleys surrounded by limestone mountains, with the main habitat in the area being secondary karst forest consisting of hardwoods mixed with shrubs and vines. The elevational range is 480–650 m (1,570–2,130 ft) above sea level. The records are some distance away from water (minimum distance about 200 m (660 ft)). The call was not heard during the periods surveys. Animals are active by night. Most individuals were found low on trees some 0.2–0.5 m (1–2 ft) above the ground, but two individuals were found on a limestone cliff inside a cave. Several other karst species have been found in the same area, including the gecko Goniurosaurus luii and the snake Elaphe moellendorffi.
