= Bush frog =

A bush frog belongs to either of two neobatrachian lineages, both found in sub-Saharan Africa and one also in Asia:

- Hyperoliidae, a family of sub-Saharan Africa and the Madagascar region, also known as sedge frogs
- Rhacophoridae, a family of the Old World Tropics
