= Gracixalus medogensis =

Conservation status
- Data Deficient (IUCN 3.1)

Scientific classification
- Kingdom: Animalia
- Phylum: Chordata
- Class: Amphibia
- Order: Anura
- Family: Rhacophoridae
- Genus: Gracixalus
- Species: G. medogensis

Binomial name
- Gracixalus medogensis (Ye and Hu, 1984)

Synonyms
- Philautus medogensis Ye and Hu, 1984; Aquixalus medogensis (Ye and Hu, 1984)

Species of amphibian

Gracixalus medogensis, also known as the Medog bubble-nest frog or Medog small treefrog, is a species of shrub frog, family Rhacophoridae. It was described from the Mêdog County in southern Tibet, and it was speculated that its distribution might extend into the adjacent Arunachal Pradesh, northeastern India. A recent study discovered a new population in Arunachal Pradesh, India.

== Description ==
Adult male snout–vent length, based on a single individual, is 26.5 mm (1.04 in). The body is slender. The tympanum is distinct. The fingers and toes have well-developed discs. The toes have basal webbing. Adult males have nuptial pads only on the first finger. Linea masculina (Note: For explanation, see Liu, C. C. [in French] (1935). "'The linea masculina,' a new secondary sex character in Salientia". Journal of Morphology. 57 (1): 131–145. doi:10.1002/jmor.1050570108.) is present. The venter is light grey or whitish.

== Habitat and conservation ==
Gracixalus medogensis occurs in tropical rain forest at elevations of 1,200–1,500 m (3,900–4,900 ft) above sea level. Specimens have been found on the shrubs along the shore of a lake deep in the forest, possibly in its breeding habitat. It is a rare species that until recently was only known from a single specimen. Because of ongoing decline in the extent and quality of its habitat, it is suspected that its overall population is decreasing. Road construction is a specific threat. It is found in the Yarlung Zangbo Grand Canyon National Nature Reserve.
