= Vampyrius =

Vampire tree frog

Conservation status
- Endangered (IUCN 3.1)

Scientific classification
- Kingdom: Animalia
- Phylum: Chordata
- Class: Amphibia
- Order: Anura
- Family: Rhacophoridae
- Subfamily: Rhacophorinae
- Genus: Vampyrius; Dubois, Ohler, and Pyron, 2021
- Species: V. vampyrus

Binomial name
- Vampyrius vampyrus (Rowley, Le, Tran, Stuart, and Hoang, 2010)

Synonyms
- Rhacophorus vampyrus Rowley, Le, Tran, Stuart, and Hoang, 2010

Species of amphibian

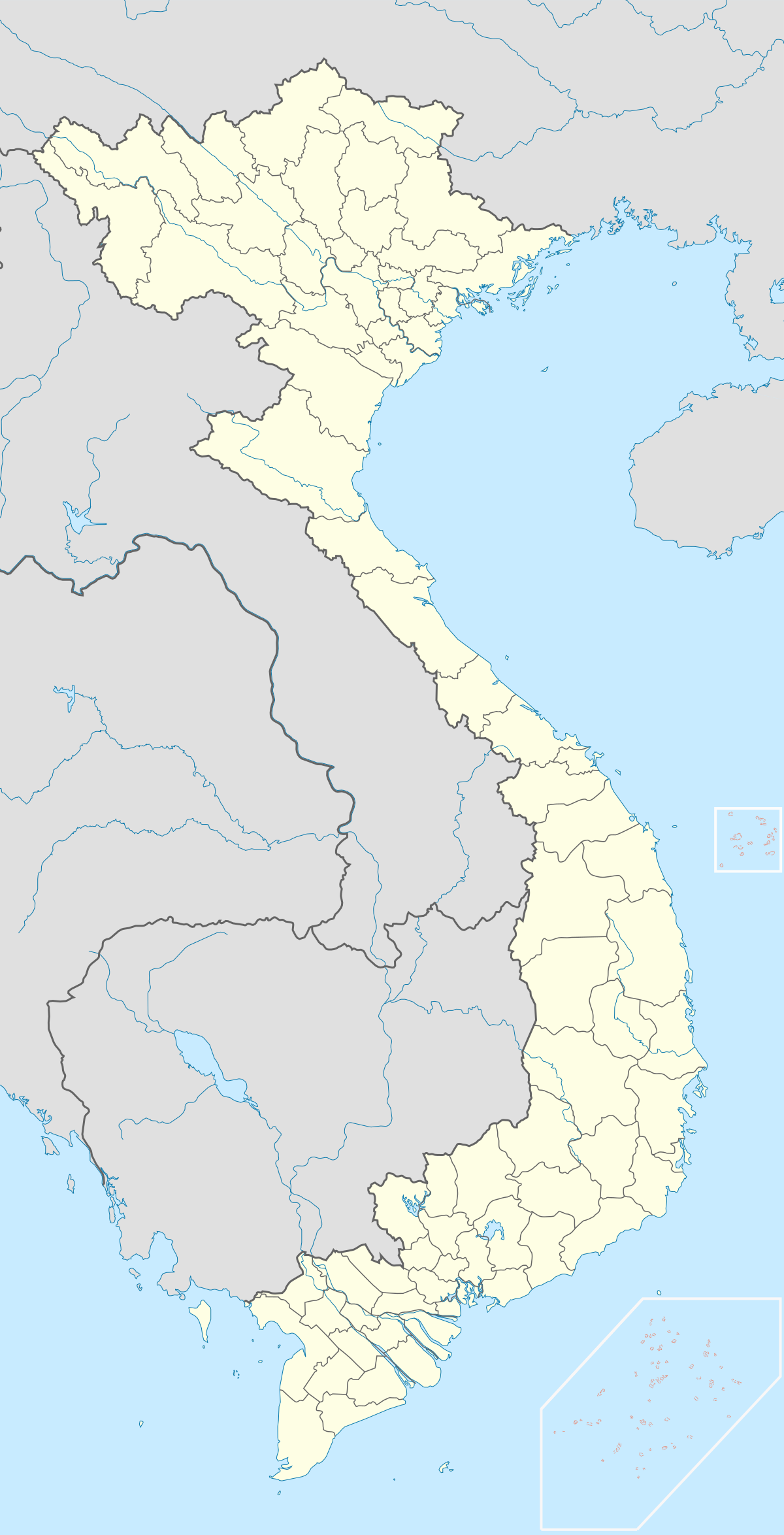
Southern Vietnam Map

Map of Vietnam, with rectangles showing approximate range of V. Vampyrus.

Vampyrius vampyrus is a medium-sized species of flying frogs endemic to Vietnam. It is found in southern Vietnam, and is not known to be found in other places globally. It Is in the kingdom Animalia, phylum Chordata, and class Amphibia. Along with this, it is in the order Anura, family Rhacophoridae, and it is the only member of the genus Vampyrus. It is also known as the vampire tree frog or the vampire flying frog because of the presence of a pair of fang-like hooks in the mouth of the tadpoles.

It is found in montane evergreen forests at 1470–2004 m. The frog is adapted to arboreal living with webbings of feet that allow it to glide between trees. These webbed feet give the name "flying" to the common name vampire flying frog, as the frog glides between trees it appears to be flying.

Rhacophorus vampyrus and Vampyrius vampyrus are used interchangeably between academic articles.

== Taxonomy ==
The first specimen was discovered in 2008 by Jodi Rowley of the Australian Museum at Sydney, Australia, and her student Le Thi Thuy Duong from Ho Chi Minh City University of Science. After collecting more specimens in 2009 and 2010, her team described the new species as Rhacophorus vampyrus in the journal Zootaxa in 2010. In 2012, the species was classified as Rhacophorus calcaneus due to the morphology of adult frogs; however, in 2014 the species was reclassified as R. vampyrus through phylogenic research. In 2021, a phylogenetic study found the species to fall far outside Rhacophorus, and instead be the sister genus to Gracixalus; for this reason, it was reclassified into the new genus Vampyrius. This classification is accepted by Amphibian Species of the World, but has not been followed by AmphibiaWeb. This disagreement among scientists contributes to why this article uses Rhacophorus vampyrus and Vampyrius vampyrus interchangeably. Rhacophorus vampyrus is in the family of Rhacophoridae, found throughout Africa, Southeast Asia, China, Taiwan, Japan, the Greater Sunda Islands, and the Philippines, which has approximately 320 species.

== Description ==
V. vampyrus can grow to 4.5 cm. There is webbing present between the toes of V. vampyrus, allowing it to glide between trees. The back of the species is pale copper-brown with fainter, dark-brown mottling. The chest and belly are white, with a very small amount of black mottling at the edge of the chest. The upper surfaces of the arms and legs are copper brown with diffuse, dark-brown barring. The upper surfaces of the hands and feet are a copper brown which fades to pinkish-cream or grey at the fingers and toes. The lower surfaces of the hands and feet are a pale grey colour. The upper surfaces of webbing of the hands and feet are dark grey to black in colour. The lower surfaces of the species are grey. V. vampyrus has pale yellow/gold irises with a small rim of blue. There is also a pointed projection at tibiotarsal articulation. Tadpoles have distinctive mouth morphology, of having black keratinized hooks. Tadpoles have elliptical bodies, with compressed and long tails, and dark brown colouring besides sometimes apparent lack of pigmentation on tail fins. Tadpole eyes are black with iris coloured with gold specks.

== Distribution ==
V. vampyrus is so far known only in southern Vietnam. Specimens were first found inside Bidoup Núi Bà National Park, although scientists expect to find them to be more widely distributed on the Langbian Plateau (specifically in Chư Yang Sin National Park and Phước Bình National Park). They have been later found in Ta Dung Nature reserve, Dak Glong District. The area that V. vampyrus extends is approximately 2,082 km^{2}. The species V. vampyrus is known to be separated between two areas geographically, which have low, unsuitable elevations between the locations. The species was previously believed to have a larger geographical range, however due to factors such as habitats loss the species no longer extended as far and wide. The species dwells in a terrestrial, forest habitat, however there is not a large amount of data on the species to give the exact range of V. Vampyrus.

== Life cycle ==
V. vampyrus is a phytotelm breeder and lays its eggs in small water-filled tree holes during the rainy seasons, generally 0.3–1.2 m above the ground. Reproduction occurs mostly from July to May, producing clutches of a maximum amount of 250 eggs. The eggs are laid in foam nests on the wall of the tree hole, where nests are usually about 30–120 cm above the ground. The larvae when hatched fall into a hollow basin filled with water. Tadpoles develop from the non-pigmented eggs, however fertilized and unfertilized eggs have no difference in the size or structure. The eggs are white in colour, along with having a thin and transparent covering on the outside shell of each egg, with diameters between 0.70 and 1.29 mm. The tadpoles are long and dark-brown in colour. Their tails are about three times as long as their bodies. The species shows an unusual tadpole mouthpart morphology unknown in other anurans, namely presence of a specific serrated horny arch on the upper jaw, and a pair of fang-like horny teeth on the lower jaw. The two keratinized hooks project forward, and are supported laterally by two similar sized fleshy papillae on the margin of the reduced lower labium. Younger tadpoles have paler, white or grey, coloration, and as they advance into later stages of life, darker brown bodies are acquired, however tails may still remain a lighter, less pigmented colour. The species is named after these unusual "fangs".

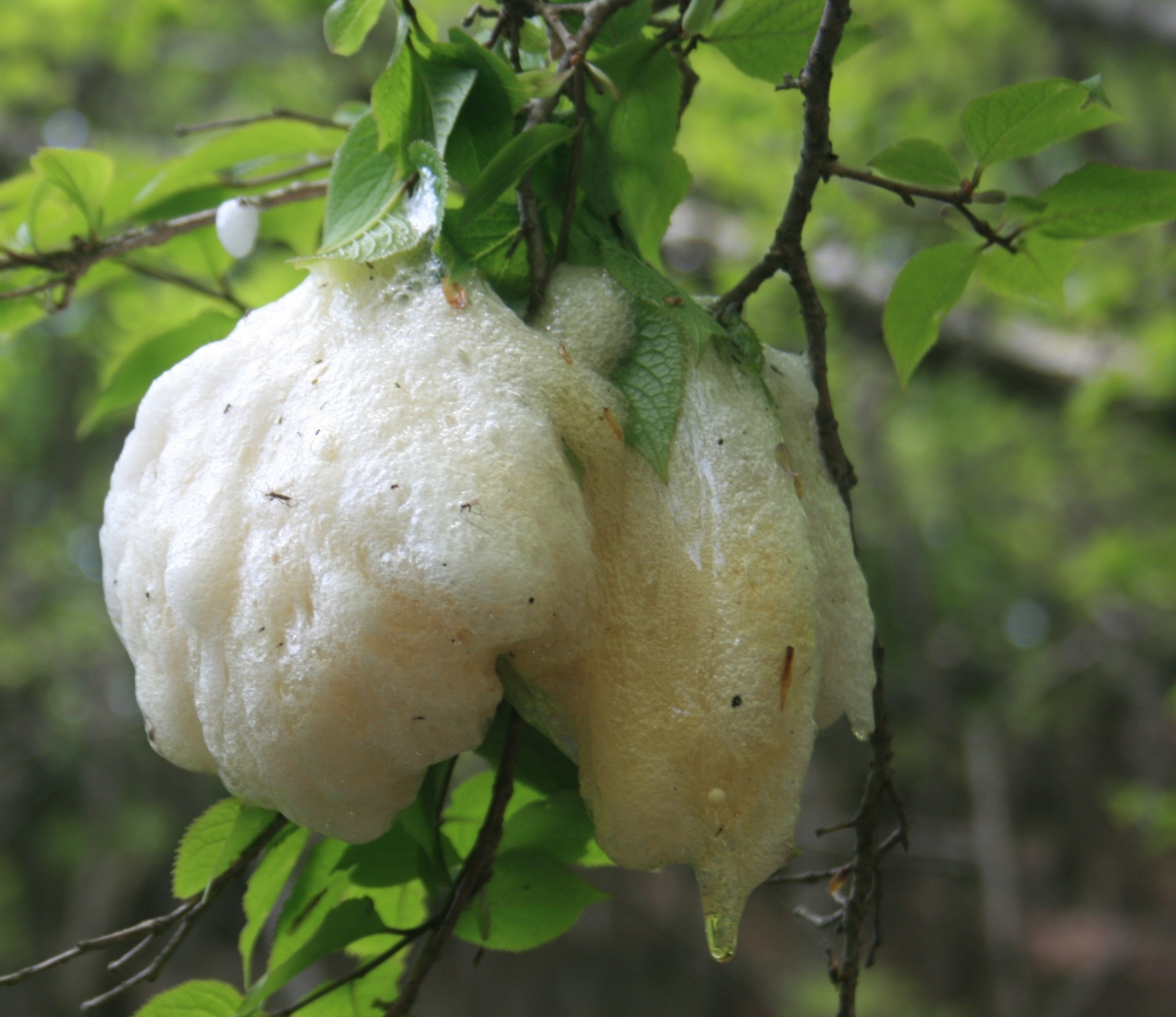
Example of Rhacophorus Frog Eggs

=== Diet ===
These unique mouthparts on the tadpoles indicate that the tadpoles are strictly feeding on eggs (oophagous) and the extra unfertilized eggs (specifically for food) are deposited by the mother frog in the water hole. This is an example of advanced parental care. The tadpoles have a large gape in the mouth, which lets them ingest larger objects, such as eggs with a jelly coating still adhered. The tadpoles have an intestine pouch that can expand to hold a large volume of eggs, and it was observed to shrink when the tadpole has not ingested food sources for a period of time.

== Conservation ==
=== Threats ===
Vampyrius vampyrus is classified as endangered under the IUCN Red List in 2014. V. vampyrus is geographically separated from its two main populations, due to the lower elevation being uninhabitable between these two areas. Due to this, having a larger range of the species would be improbable naturally, and reproduction to possibility increase the population would need human intervention due to the unsuitable conditions. Along with this, V. vampyrus needs to live in moist and dense montane rainforest environments. Threats such as Deforestation, along with exploitation of other forest resources are threats to V. vampyrus, along with the aquaculture and agriculture processes, mostly for the harvesting of coffee beans, can cause environmental changes to the area. These changes continue to decrease the number of frogs alive, and due to the threats persisting, the number of individuals in the species is continuing to decrease. Road development is also another factor that may put the environmental and species of V. Vampyrus in danger, where building roads requires damaging ecosystems along with a possible contributor to deforestation. Since V. Vampyrus needs montane rainforest environments to survive, deforestation and other factors disturbing the rainforests could cause extinction of the endangered species. Along with this, V. vampyrus lives in arboreally, dwelling in trees along with reproduction that occurs mainly in tree holes. Losing the natural environmental poses a threat on the reproduction and habitat of V. vampyrus. Vietnam faces challenges with protecting forests, in order to preserve the ecosystem that is present, including V. vampyrus.

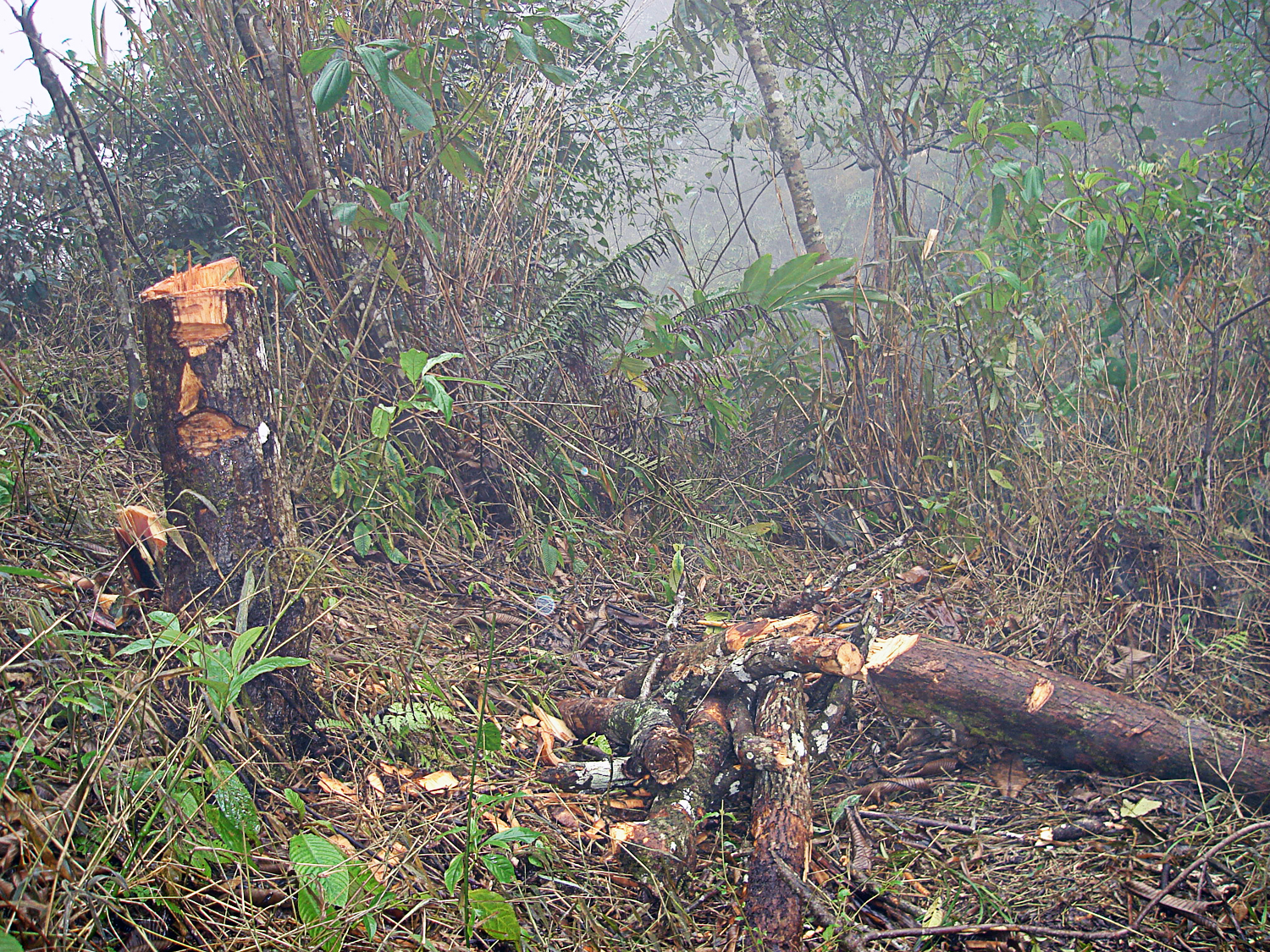
Deforestation in Vietnam

=== Efforts ===
This species is only known to be found in protected areas, which include Bidoup-Nui National Park and Ta Dung Nature Reserve. There is also probability that V. vampyrus ranges into other areas, which may be protected areas such as Chu Yang Sin National Park and Phuoc Binh National Park, along with unprotected areas as well. There is a lack of data on the species overall, which could be a factor that inhibits conservation efforts to be made. One way which conservation can be attempted for V. vampyrus is finding more data and doing extended research on the species, specifically including research on habitat threats, population, and the ecology of the species. The frog has not since been translocated in order to attempt conservation, or has been in captivation.
