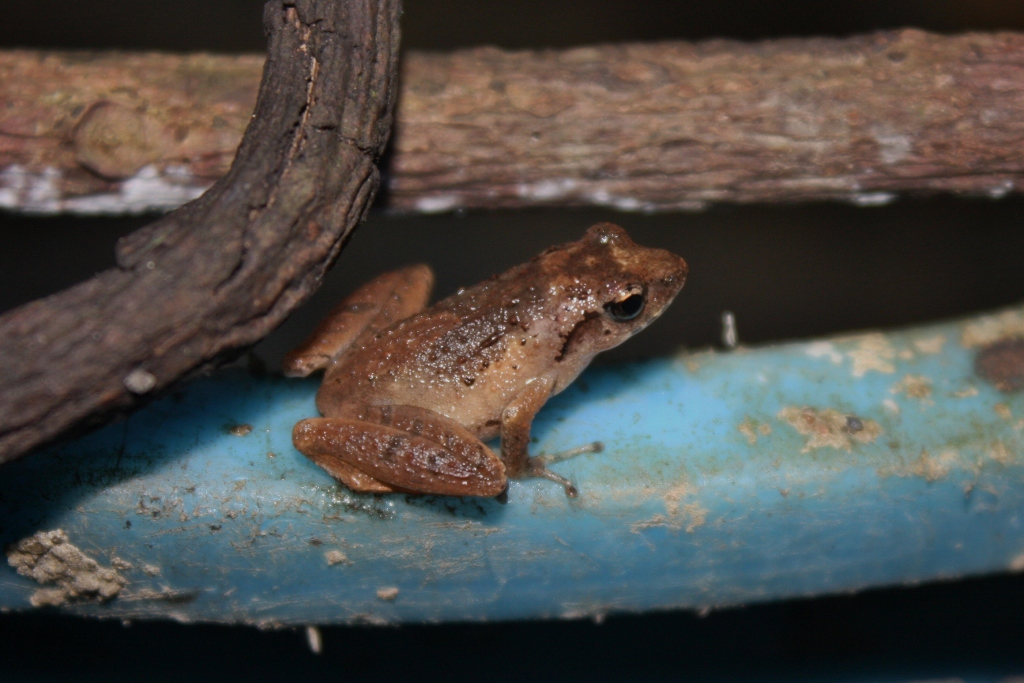
- Liuixalus romeri

Scientific classification
- Kingdom: Animalia
- Phylum: Chordata
- Class: Amphibia
- Order: Anura
- Family: Rhacophoridae
- Subfamily: Rhacophorinae
- Genus: Liuixalus; Li, Che, Bain, Zhao, and Zhang, 2008

Type species
- Philautus romeri Li, Che, Bain, Zhao, and Zhang, 2008

Synonyms
- Romerus Dubois, Ohler & Pyron, 2021

= Liuixalus =

Genus of amphibians

Liuixalus is a small genus of rhacophorid frogs that are distributed in southern China (Hong Kong, Hainan, Guangxi, Guangdong). Some species now in Liuixalus were originally placed in Philautus. It is thought to be sister to the remaining lineages within Rhacophorinaeae.

The genus was first erected as Liuixalus in 2008 based on molecular genetic evidence showing distinctness of Liuixalus romeri (then known as Chiromantis romeri) from the rest of Chiromantis. The genus name Liuixalus commemorates Liu Chengzhao, a Chinese herpetologist. In 2021, another phylogenetic study deemed the name Liuixalus as invalidly proposed due to a lack of a diagnosis for the genus in the original study, and thus redescribed the genus as Romerus, alongside morphological characteristics distinguishing it. The name Romerus commemorates British herpetologist John D. Romer. However, in 2023, the name was changed back to Liuixalus on the basis of Ren, Jiang & Li, who refuted the requirement for a genus name to have morphological characteristics associated with it.

The International Union for Conservation of Nature (IUCN) has assessed two species of the genus as vulnerable (Liuixalus ocellatus and L. hainanus), one as endangered (L. romeri), and one as least-concern (L. feii), while Liuixalus shiwandashan is considered data deficient.

== Species ==
There are six recognized species in the genus Liuixalus:

- Liuixalus calcarius (Milto, Poyarkov, Orlov, and Nguyen, 2013)
- Liuixalus feii Yang, Rao, and Wang, 2015
- Liuixalus hainanus (Liu and Wu, 2004)
- Liuixalus ocellatus (Liu and Hu, 1973)
- Liuixalus romeri (Smith, 1953)
- Liuixalus shiwandashan (Li, Mo, Jiang, Xie, and Jiang, 2015)
