= Gracixalus gracilipes =

Conservation status
- Least Concern (IUCN 3.1)

Scientific classification
- Kingdom: Animalia
- Phylum: Chordata
- Class: Amphibia
- Order: Anura
- Family: Rhacophoridae
- Genus: Gracixalus
- Species: G. gracilipes

Binomial name
- Gracixalus gracilipes (Bourret, 1937)

Synonyms
- Philautus gracilipes Bourret, 1937; Chirixalus gracilipes (Bourret, 1937); Aquixalus gracilipes (Bourret, 1937)

Species of amphibian

Gracixalus gracilipes, commonly known as the Chapa bubble-nest frog, black eye-lidded small tree frog, yellow and black-spotted tree frog or slender-legged bush frog, is a species of shrub frog from northern Vietnam, southern China (Yunnan, Guangxi, Guangdong), and northwestern Thailand (and, presumably, also in adjacent Myanmar).

== Appearance ==
G. gracilipes is a small frog: males grow to about 22 mm (0.87 in) and females to about 39 mm (1.5 in) in snout-vent length. It inhabits evergreen and bamboo forests on hills. The eggs are deposited on leaves overhanging temporary forest pools; upon hatching, the tadpoles drop into the water where their development continues.

== Conservation status ==
Scientists classify this frog as least concern of extinction because of its large range, which includes at least one protected park: Hoang Lien National Park. It does face habitat loss associated with road construction and agriculture. Humans who come to the forest to hunt or collect plants may also disturb this frog.
