= Ocellated treefrog (disambiguation) =

The ocellated treefrog is a species of frog in the family Hylidae.

Ocellated treefrog may also refer to:

- Ocellated forest treefrog, a frog of the family Arthroleptidae found in Africa
- Ocellated small treefrog, a frog of the family Rhacophoridae endemic to Hainan Island, China
