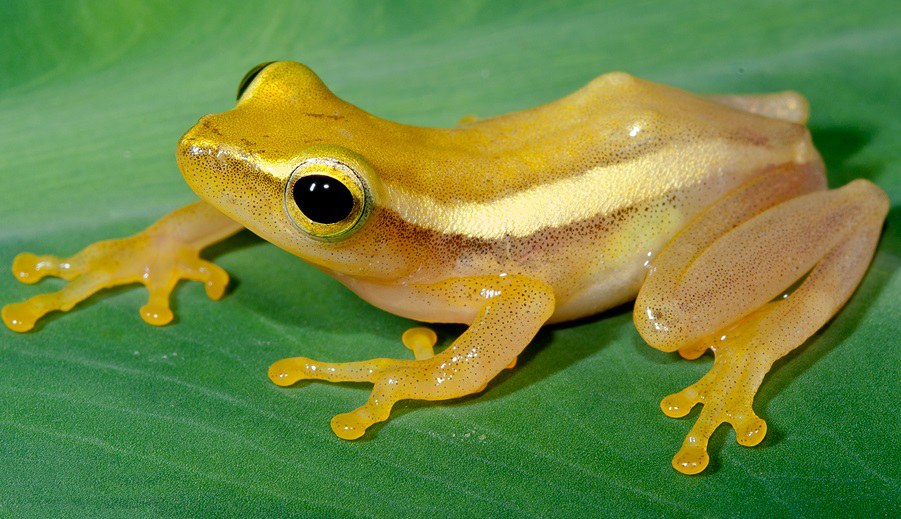

Conservation status
- Least Concern (IUCN 3.1)

Scientific classification
- Kingdom: Animalia
- Phylum: Chordata
- Class: Amphibia
- Order: Anura
- Family: Rhacophoridae
- Genus: Rohanixalus
- Species: R. vittatus

Binomial name
- Rohanixalus vittatus (Boulenger, 1887)

Synonyms
- Ixalus vittatus Boulenger, 1887; Philautus vittatus — Smith, 1924; Rhacophorus (Philautus) vittatus — Ahl, 1931; Chirixalus vittatus — Liem, 1970; Chiromantis vittatus — Frost et al., 2006; Feihyla vittata — Fei, Ye, and Jiang, 2010

= Rohanixalus vittatus =

Species of frog

Rohanixalus vittatus is a species of frog in the family Rhacophoridae. It is found in Northeast India, Bangladesh, Myanmar, Thailand, Cambodia, Laos, and Vietnam, as well as in isolated populations in southern China (in southeastern Tibet, southern Yunnan and Guangxi, Hainan, Guangdong, and Zhejiang). Many common names have been coined for it: two-striped pigmy tree frog, Bhamo tree frog, Boulenger's tree frog, striped Asian treefrog, violet pigmy tree frog, and lateral-striped opposite-fingered treefrog.

== Taxonomy ==
Formerly described in Feihyla, it was moved to the new genus Rohanixalus in 2020 following a phylogenetic study.

== Habitat and threats ==
Rohanixalus vittatus occurs in open grassy areas in forest and forest edge at elevations up to about 1,500 m (4,900 ft). It tolerates some habitat modification and also occurs in rice paddies. It is a widespread and generally common species that is not facing known threats. Its range includes a number of protected areas. Sometimes people harvest this frog to eat.

== Reproduction ==
The female frog lays eggs in a foam nest. This species breeds by larval development in forest ponds and rain pools.
