= Gracixalus quyeti =

Conservation status
- Vulnerable (IUCN 3.1)

Scientific classification
- Kingdom: Animalia
- Phylum: Chordata
- Class: Amphibia
- Order: Anura
- Family: Rhacophoridae
- Genus: Gracixalus
- Species: G. quyeti

Binomial name
- Gracixalus quyeti (Nguyen, Hendrix, Böhme, Vu & Ziegler, 2008)

Synonyms
- Philautus quyeti Nguyen, Hendrix, Böhme, Vu & Ziegler, 2008

Species of amphibian

Gracixalus quyeti is a species of shrub frog. It is endemic to Vietnam, where it has been observed in Phong Nha–Ke Bang National Park, and Laos, where it has been observed in Hin Nam No National Protected Area and Nakai-Nam Theun National Protected Area. This frog has an altitude range of 300 to 1100 meters above sea level.

G. quyeti is smaller than most other frogs in Rhacophoridae. It has a triangle-shaped spot between its eyes. The skin of the frog's back is dark brown in color with a Y-shaped mark. There is some yellow-white color on the chest, with brown marbling.

This frog has been found in lowland and highland evergreen forests and karst forests. Scientists believe the female frog may lay eggs on leaves over water, into which the tadpoles fall, as other frogs in Rhacophoridae do, but this has not been confirmed.

Scientists classify this frog as vulnerable to extinction due to habitat degradation associated with the construction of roads, farms, and infrastructure and the human harvesting of forest products.
