= Đắk Glei district =

Đăk Glei district Huyện Đăk Glei
- District
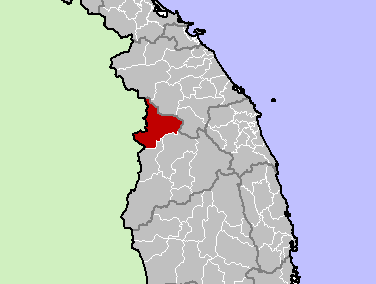
- Location in Kon Tum province
- Country: Vietnam
- Province: Kon Tum
- Capital: Đăk Glei

Population (2003)
  - Total: 31,166
- Time zone: UTC+7 (Indochina Time)

Đăk Glei is a rural district (huyện) of Kon Tum province in the Central Highlands region of Vietnam. As of 2003 the district had a population of 31,166. The district covers an area of 1,485 km². The district capital lies at Đăk Glei.
