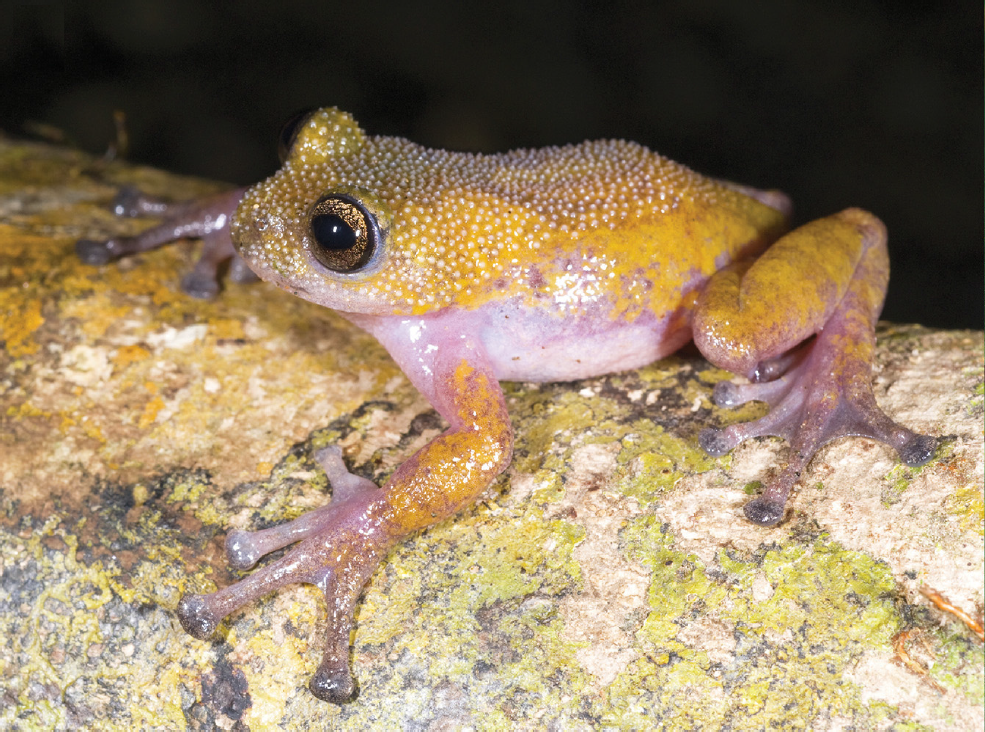
- Gracixalus lumarius

Scientific classification
- Kingdom: Animalia
- Phylum: Chordata
- Class: Amphibia
- Order: Anura
- Family: Rhacophoridae
- Subfamily: Rhacophorinae
- Genus: Gracixalus; Delorme, Dubois, Grosjean & Ohler, 2005

Type species
- Philautus gracilipes Bourret, 1937

Diversity
- See text

= Gracixalus =

Genus of amphibians

Gracixalus is a genus of shrub frogs (family Rhacophoridae) from south-eastern Asia.

Phylogenetic evidence indicates that it is the sister genus to the genus Vampyrius, which contains the vampire tree frog.

== Species ==
The following species are recognised in the genus Gracixalus:

- Gracixalus carinensis (Boulenger, 1893)
- Gracixalus gracilipes (Bourret, 1937)
- Gracixalus guangdongensis Wang, Zeng, Liu, and Wang, 2018
- Gracixalus jinggangensis Zeng, Zhao, Chen, Chen, Zhang, and Wang, 2017
- Gracixalus jinxiuensis (Hu, 1978)
- Gracixalus lumarius Rowley, Le, Dau, Hoang & Cao, 2014
- Gracixalus medogensis (Ye & Hu, 1984)
- Gracixalus nonggangensis Mo, Zhang, Luo & Chen, 2013
- Gracixalus patkaiensis Boruah, Deepak, Patel, Jithin, Yomcha and Das, 2023
- Gracixalus quangi (Rowley, Dau, Nguyen, Cao & Nguyen, 2011)
- Gracixalus quyeti (Nguyen, Hendrix, Böhme, Vu & Ziegler, 2008)
- Gracixalus sapaensis Matsui, Ohler, Eto, and Nguyen, 2017
- Gracixalus seesom (Matsui, Khonsue, Panha & Eto, 2015)
- Gracixalus supercornutus (Orlov, Ho & Nguyen, 2004)
- Gracixalus tianlinensis Chen, Bei, Liao, Zhou, and Mo, 2018
- Gracixalus trieng Rowley, Le, Hoang, Cao & Dau, 2020
- Gracixalus truongi Tran, Pham, Le, Nguyen, Ziegler, and Pham, 2023
- Gracixalus yunnanensis Yu, Li, Wang, Rao, Wu, and Yang, 2019
- Gracixalus ziegleri Le, Do, Tran, Nguyen, Orlov, Ninh & Nguyen, 2021
