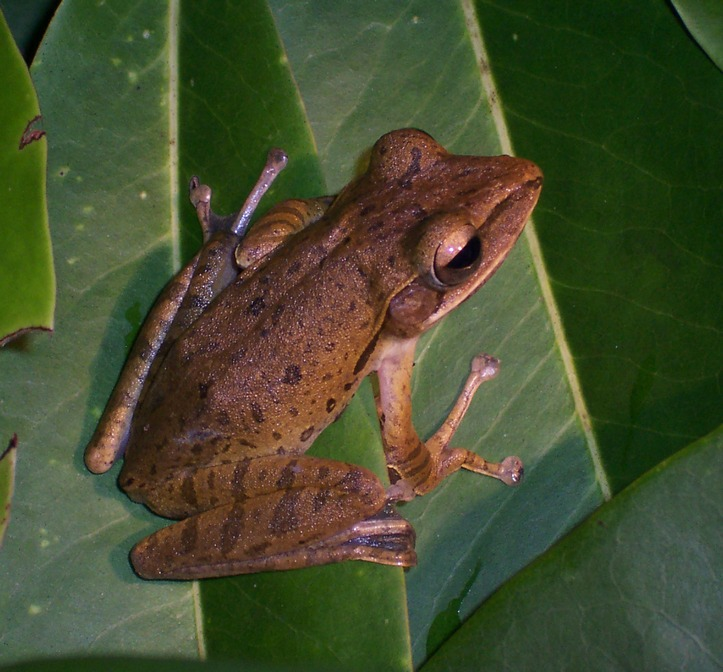
- Common tree frog (Polypedates leucomystax)

Scientific classification
- Kingdom: Animalia
- Phylum: Chordata
- Class: Amphibia
- Order: Anura
- Family: Rhacophoridae
- Subfamily: Rhacophorinae; Hoffman, 1932

Genera
- See text.

= Rhacophorinae =

Subfamily of amphibians

The Rhacophorinae are a subfamily of frogs in the family Rhacophoridae. They range from tropical Africa and Asia to temperate China and Japan.

== Genera ==
The following genera are recognised in the subfamily Rhacophorinae, representing 422 species:

- Beddomixalus Abraham, Pyron, Ansil, Zachariah, and Zachariah, 2013 (monotypic)
- Chirixalus Boulenger, 1893 (six species)
- Chiromantis Peters, 1854 (four species)
- Feihyla Frost, Grant, Faivovich, Bain, Haas, Haddad, de Sá, Channing, Wilkinson, Donnellan, Raxworthy, Campbell, Blotto, Moler, Drewes, Nussbaum, Lynch, Green, and Wheeler, 2006 (six species)
- Ghatixalus Biju, Roelants, and Bossuyt, 2008 (three species)
- Gracixalus Delorme, Dubois, Grosjean, and Ohler, 2005 (18 species)
- Kurixalus Ye, Fei, and Dubois, 1999 (22 species)
- Leptomantis Peters, 1867 (13 species)
- Liuixalus Li, Che, Bain, Zhao, and Zhang, 2008 (six species)
- Mercurana Abraham et al., 2013 (monotypic)
- Nasutixalus Jiang, Yan, Wang, and Che, 2016 (three species)
- Nyctixalus Boulenger, 1882 (three species)
- Philautus Gistel, 1848 (54 species)
- Polypedates Tschudi, 1838 (25 species)
- Pseudophilautus Laurent, 1943 (80 species)
- Raorchestes Biju, Shouche, Dubois, Dutta, and Bossuyt, 2010 (74 species)
- Rhacophorus Kuhl and Van Hasselt, 1822 (45 species)
- Rohanixalus Biju, Garg, Gokulakrishnan, Chandrakasan, Thammachoti, Ren, Gopika, Bisht, Hamidy, and Shouche, 2020 (eight species)
- Taruga Meegaskumbura, Meegaskumbura, Bowatte, Manamendra-Arachchi, Pethiyagoda, Hanken, and Schneider, 2010 (three species)
- Theloderma Tschudi, 1838 (28 species)
- Vampyrius Dubois, Ohler, and Pyron, 2021 (monotypic)
- Zhangixalus Li, Jiang, Ren, and Jiang, 2019 (40 species)

== Phylogeny ==
The following phylogeny of Rhacophorinae is from Yu et al. (2008).

- Rhacophorinae
  - Liuixalus
  - - - Nyctixalus
      - Theloderma
    - - Philautus, Kurixalus
      - - Gracixalus
        - - Chiromantis
          - - - Feihyla
              - Polypedates
            - Rhacophorus
