= Orixalus carinensis =

Conservation status
- Data Deficient (IUCN 3.1)

Scientific classification
- Kingdom: Animalia
- Phylum: Chordata
- Class: Amphibia
- Order: Anura
- Family: Rhacophoridae
- Genus: Orixalus
- Species: O. carinensis

Binomial name
- Orixalus carinensis (Boulenger, 1893)

Synonyms
- Ixalus carinensis Boulenger, 1893; Rhacophorus carinensis (Boulenger, 1893); Philautus carinensis (Boulenger, 1893); Aquixalus carinensis (Boulenger, 1893); Kurixalus carinensis (Boulenger, 1893); Orixalus carinensis Dubois, Ohler, and Pyron, 2021

Species of frog

Orixalus carinensis, also known as the Burmese bubble-nest frog, Burmese bush frog, brown Carin tree frog and Karin Hills bush frog, is a species of frog in the family Rhacophoridae from Thailand, Burma, and Vietnam. It has been observed between 884 and 2020 meters above sea level.

Scientists cite deforestation as a threat to this frog. Its range includes at least one protected park: Panlaung and Padalin Cave Wildlife Sanctuary.
