= Liuixalus ocellatus =

Conservation status
- Vulnerable (IUCN 3.1)

Scientific classification
- Kingdom: Animalia
- Phylum: Chordata
- Class: Amphibia
- Order: Anura
- Family: Rhacophoridae
- Genus: Liuixalus
- Species: L. ocellatus

Binomial name
- Liuixalus ocellatus (Liu & Hu, 1973)

Synonyms
- Philautus ocellatus Liu & Hu, 1973; Romerus ocellatus Dubois, Ohler & Pyron, 2021

Species of frog

Liuixalus ocellatus (common names ocellated bubble-nest frog and ocellated small treefrog) is a species of frog in the family Rhacophoridae. It is endemic to Hainan Island, China.

== Description ==
L. ocellatus are tiny frogs: males grow to about 18 mm (0.71 in) and females to 19 mm (0.75 in) in snout-vent length.

== Habitat ==
L. ocellatus inhabits rainforests and bamboo forests of southern Hainan. It breeds in rain-filled bamboo stems by larval development. It has not been recorded outside forest. This frog has been observed between 200 and 1300 meters above sea level.

The frog's range includes several protected parks.

== Threats ==
The IUCN classifies this frog as vulnerable to extinction from pollution and habitat loss associated with rubber, banana, and areca cultivation.

This frog was once vulnerable to habitat loss due to infrastructure development for tourism and logging, but scientists say this threat has passed.
