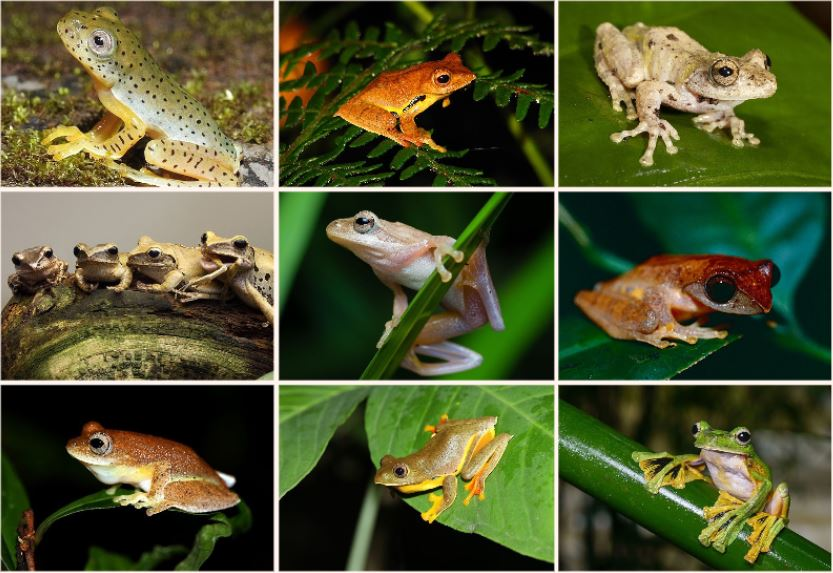
- Rhacophoridae diversity

Scientific classification
- Kingdom: Animalia
- Phylum: Chordata
- Class: Amphibia
- Order: Anura
- Superfamily: Ranoidea
- Family: Rhacophoridae; Hoffman, 1932 (1858)

Subfamilies
- Buergeriinae; Rhacophorinae

= Rhacophoridae =

Family of amphibians

The Rhacophoridae are a family of frogs in tropical sub-Saharan Africa, South India and Sri Lanka, Japan, northeastern India to eastern China and Taiwan, south through the Philippines and Greater Sundas, and Sulawesi. They are commonly known as shrub frogs, or more ambiguously as "moss frogs" or "bush frogs". Some Rhacophoridae are called "tree frogs". Among the most spectacular members of this family are numerous "flying frogs".

Although a few groups are primarily terrestrial, rhacophorids are predominantly arboreal treefrogs. Mating frogs, while in amplexus, hold on to a branch, and beat their legs to form a foam. The eggs are laid in the foam and covered with seminal fluid before the foam hardens into a protective casing. In certain species, this process occurs collectively. The foam is deposited above a water source, ensuring that the tadpoles drop into the water upon hatching.

The species within this family vary in size from 1.5 to 12 cm (0.59 to 4.72 in). Like other arboreal frogs, they have toe discs, and those of the genus Chiromantis have two opposable fingers on each hand. This family also contains the Old World flying frogs, including Wallace's flying frog (Rhacophorus nigropalmatus). These frogs have extensive webbing between their fore and hind limbs, allowing them to glide through the air.

== Taxonomy ==
=== Evolution ===
Taxonomic relationships within the Rhacophoridae are incompletely understood. Molecular phylogenetic analyses indicate that some cryptic species remain undescribed, while taxa currently considered separate species may need to be synonymized.

The Rhacophoridae are the sister group to the Mantellidae, a family of frogs restricted to Madagascar. The two families are thought to have diverged during the Paleocene, although previous studies estimated a Cretaceous divergence. Two different hypotheses for this divergence have been proposed: one that the Mantellidae and Rhacophoridae diverged when Insular India broke from Madagascar, with the Rhacophoridae colonizing the rest of Asia following the collision of India with Asia, and the other proposing that the common ancestors of both families inhabited Asia, with the ancestral Mantellidae colonizing Madagascar from India via long-distance dispersal, using India as a stepping stone.

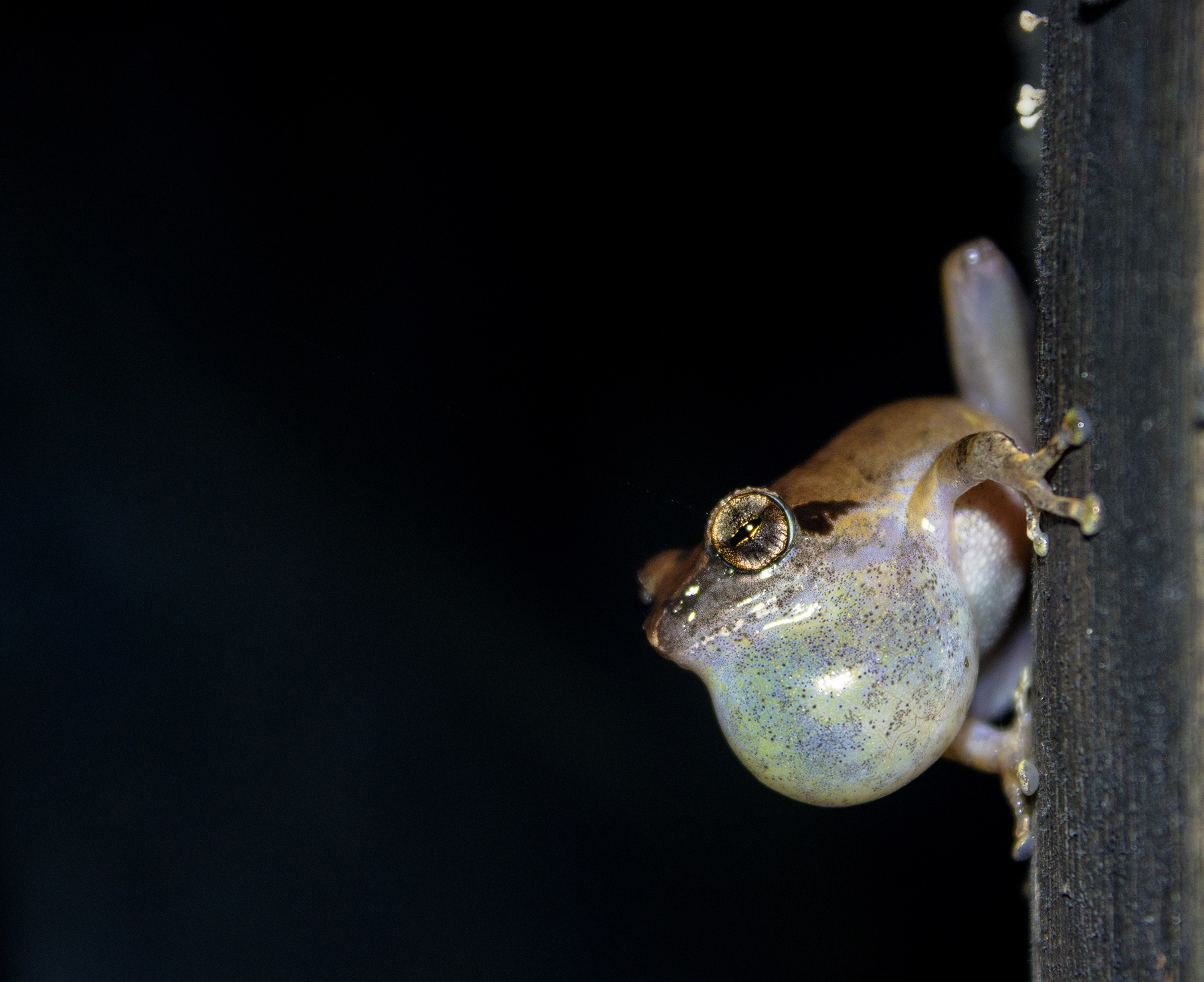
Amboli bush frog (Pseudophilautus amboli), a member of the Rhacophoridae, with enlarged vocal sac for mating calls

=== Genera ===
- Subfamily Buergeriinae Channing, 1989
  - Buergeria Tschudi, 1838
- Subfamily Rhacophorinae Hoffman, 1932 (1858)
  - Beddomixalus Abraham, Pyron, Ansil, Zachariah, and Zachariah, 2013
  - Chirixalus Boulenger, 1893
  - Chiromantis Peters, 1854
  - Feihyla Frost, Grant, Faivovich, Bain, Haas, Haddad, de Sá, Channing, Wilkinson, Donnellan, Raxworthy, Campbell, Blotto, Moler, Drewes, Nussbaum, Lynch, Green, and Wheeler, 2006
  - Ghatixalus Biju, Roelants, and Bossuyt, 2008
  - Gracixalus Delorme, Dubois, Grosjean, and Ohler, 2005
  - Kurixalus Ye, Fei, and Dubois, 1999
  - Leptomantis Peters, 1867
  - Liuixalus Li, Che, Bain, Zhao, and Zhang, 2008
  - Mercurana Abraham et al., 2013
  - Nasutixalus Jiang, Yan, Wang, and Che, 2016
  - Nyctixalus Boulenger, 1882
  - Philautus Gistel, 1848
  - Polypedates Tschudi, 1838
  - Pseudophilautus Laurent, 1943
  - Raorchestes Biju, Shouche, Dubois, Dutta, and Bossuyt, 2010
  - Rhacophorus Kuhl and Van Hasselt, 1822
  - Rohanixalus Biju, Garg, Gokulakrishnan, Chandrakasan, Thammachoti, Ren, Gopika, Bisht, Hamidy, and Shouche, 2020
  - Taruga Meegaskumbura, Meegaskumbura, Bowatte, Manamendra-Arachchi, Pethiyagoda, Hanken, and Schneider, 2010
  - Theloderma Tschudi, 1838
  - Vampyrius Dubois, Ohler, and Pyron, 2021
  - Zhangixalus Li, Jiang, Ren, and Jiang, 2019

=== Phylogeny ===
This phylogeny of the Rhacophoridae is from Yu et al. (2008):

- Rhacophoridae
  - Buergeriinae
    Buergeria
  - Rhacophorinae
    - Liuixalus
    - - - Nyctixalus
        - Theloderma
      - - Philautus, Kurixalus
        - - Gracixalus
          - - Chiromantis
            - - - Feihyla
                - Polypedates
              - Rhacophorus

== Parasites ==
Like many frogs, rhacophorids harbour monogenean worms in their urinary bladders. The parasite species specialized to this family of frogs belong to the genus Indopolystoma, described in 2019.
