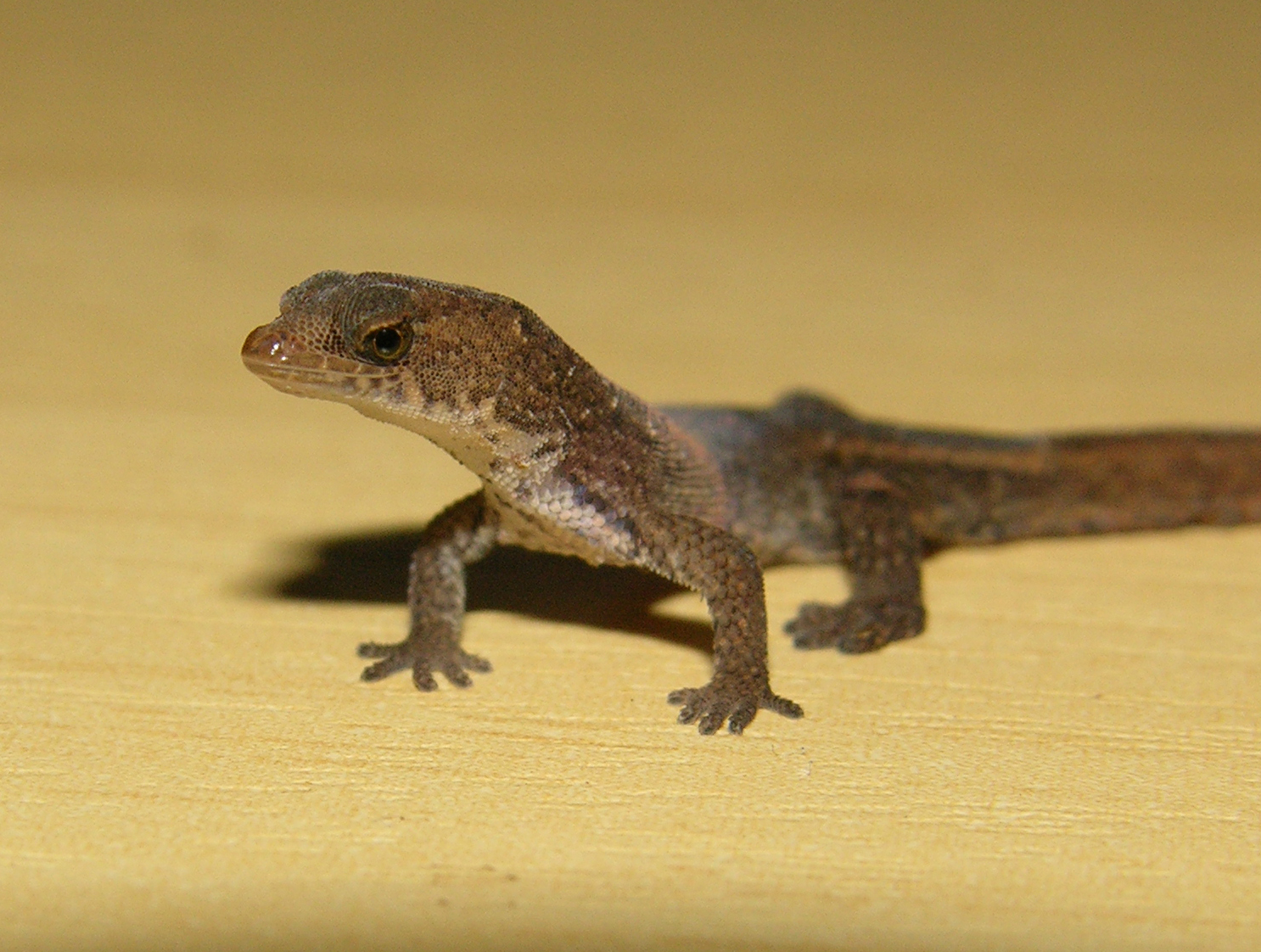

Scientific classification
- Kingdom: Animalia
- Phylum: Chordata
- Class: Reptilia
- Order: Squamata
- Suborder: Gekkota
- Family: Sphaerodactylidae
- Genus: Chatogekko; Gamble, Daza, Colli, Vitt & Bauer, 2011
- Species: C. amazonicus

Binomial name
- Chatogekko amazonicus (Andersson, 1918)

Synonyms
- Sphaerodactylus amazonicus Andersson, 1918; Coleodactylus zernyi Wettstein, 1928; Coleodactylus amazonicus — Vanzolini, 1957; Coleodactylus guimaraesi Vanzolini, 1957; Coleodactylus amazonicus — Rösler, 1995; Chattogekko amazonicus — Gamble et al., 2011

= Brazilian pygmy gecko =

Species of lizard

The Brazilian pygmy gecko (Chatogekko amazonicus) is a species of South American lizard in the family Sphaerodactylidae. The species is monotypic in the genus Chatogekko. It grows to a maximum total length (including tail) of only 24 millimetres (0.94 in). It is found in leaf litter on the forest floor, and preys on springtails and mites. The species is oviparous.

The gecko's skin is superhydrophobic as a result of tiny hairs on its surface, allowing Chatogekko amazonicus to be able to avoid drowning in rainstorms despite its small size, and even float on water.

The following cladogram presented by Gamble et al. in 2011 represents phylogenetic relationships among the genera of sphaerodactyl geckos which were recognized as being valid at that time.

- - Saurodactylus
  - - Chatogekko
    - - Gonatodes
      - Lepidoblepharis
    - - Pseudogonatodes
      - - Coleodactylus
        - Sphaerodactylus
