= Lepidoblepharis conolepis =

Conservation status
- Endangered (IUCN 3.1)

Scientific classification
- Kingdom: Animalia
- Phylum: Chordata
- Class: Reptilia
- Order: Squamata
- Suborder: Gekkota
- Family: Sphaerodactylidae
- Genus: Lepidoblepharis
- Species: L. conolepis

Binomial name
- Lepidoblepharis conolepis Ávila-Pires, 2001

Species of lizard

Lepidoblepharis conolepis is a species of gecko, a lizard in the family Sphaerodactylidae. The species is endemic to Ecuador.

== Geographic range ==
L. conolepis is found in Cotopaxi Province and Pichincha Province, Ecuador, on the western slope of the Andes.

== Habitat ==
The preferred habitat of L. conolepis is humid montane forest at altitudes of 1,200–2,000 m (3,900–6,600 ft).

== Description ==
Relatively large for its genus, L. conolepis may attain a snout-to-vent length (SVL) of 4.4 cm (1.7 in). The dorsal scales and lateral body scales are conical, to which the specific name refers.

== Reproduction ==
L. conolepis is oviparous.
