= Lepidoblepharis peraccae =

Conservation status
- Least Concern (IUCN 3.1)

Scientific classification
- Kingdom: Animalia
- Phylum: Chordata
- Class: Reptilia
- Order: Squamata
- Suborder: Gekkota
- Family: Sphaerodactylidae
- Genus: Lepidoblepharis
- Species: L. peraccae

Binomial name
- Lepidoblepharis peraccae Boulenger, 1908

Species of lizard

Lepidoblepharis peraccae is a species of gecko, a lizard in the family Sphaerodactylidae. The species is endemic to Colombia.

== Etymology ==
The specific name, peraccae, is in honor of Italian herpetologist Mario Giacinto Peracca.

== Geographic distribution ==
Lepidoblepharis peraccae is found in western Colombia, in Chocó Department and Valle del Cauca Department.

== Description ==
The holotype of Lepidoblepharis peraccae has a snout-to-vent length (SVL) of 23 mm (0.91 in) and a tail length of 17 mm (0.67 in).

== Habitat ==
The preferred natural habitat of Lepidoblepharis peraccae is forest, at elevations from near sea level to 500 m (1,600 ft).

== Reproduction ==
Lepidoblepharis peraccae is oviparous.
