= Lepidoblepharis williamsi =

Conservation status
- Endangered (IUCN 3.1)

Scientific classification
- Kingdom: Animalia
- Phylum: Chordata
- Class: Reptilia
- Order: Squamata
- Suborder: Gekkota
- Family: Sphaerodactylidae
- Genus: Lepidoblepharis
- Species: L. williamsi

Binomial name
- Lepidoblepharis williamsi Ayala & Serna, 1986

Species of lizard

Lepidoblepharis williamsi is a species of gecko, a lizard in the family Sphaerodactylidae. The species is endemic to Colombia.

== Etymology ==
The specific name, williamsi, is in honor of American herpetologist Ernest Edward Williams.

== Geographic range ==
L. williamsi is found in Antioquia Department, Colombia.

== Description ==
L. williamsi may attain a snout-to-vent length (SVL) of 3 cm (1.2 in). It usually has rust-colored dorsolateral tail stripes.

== Reproduction ==
L. williamsi is oviparous.
