= Lepidoblepharis buchwaldi =

Conservation status
- Least Concern (IUCN 3.1)

Scientific classification
- Kingdom: Animalia
- Phylum: Chordata
- Class: Reptilia
- Order: Squamata
- Suborder: Gekkota
- Family: Sphaerodactylidae
- Genus: Lepidoblepharis
- Species: L. buchwaldi

Binomial name
- Lepidoblepharis buchwaldi F. Werner, 1910

Species of lizard

Lepidoblepharis buchwaldi is a species of gecko, a lizard in the family Sphaerodactylidae. The species is endemic to Ecuador.

== Etymology ==
The specific name, buchwaldi, is in honor of Otto von Buchwald (1843–1934), a German engineer, anthropologist, and naturalist, who worked in Ecuador.

== Geographic range ==
L. buchwaldi is found in western Ecuador, in the foothills of the Andes.

== Habitat ==
The preferred natural habitat of L. buchwaldi is forest, at altitudes from sea level to 900 m (3,000 ft). It has also been found in artificial habitats such as cacao, mango, and orange plantations.

== Description ==
The holotype of L. buchwaldi measures 48 mm (1.9 in) in total length, of which the head and body make up 23 mm (0.91 in).

== Reproduction ==
L. buchwaldi is oviparous.
