= Lepidoblepharis grandis =

Conservation status
- Vulnerable (IUCN 3.1)

Scientific classification
- Kingdom: Animalia
- Phylum: Chordata
- Class: Reptilia
- Order: Squamata
- Suborder: Gekkota
- Family: Sphaerodactylidae
- Genus: Lepidoblepharis
- Species: L. grandis

Binomial name
- Lepidoblepharis grandis Miyata, 1985

Species of lizard

Lepidoblepharis grandis is a species of gecko, a lizard in the family Sphaerodactylidae. The species is endemic to Ecuador.

== Geographic range ==
L. grandis is found in Pichincha Province, Ecuador.

== Habitat ==
The preferred habitat of L. grandis is wet forests at altitudes of 1,190–1,500 m (3,900–4,920 ft).

== Description ==
Large for its genus, L. grandis may attain a snout-to-vent length (SVL) of 5.6 cm (2.2 in).

== Reproduction ==
L. grandis is oviparous.
