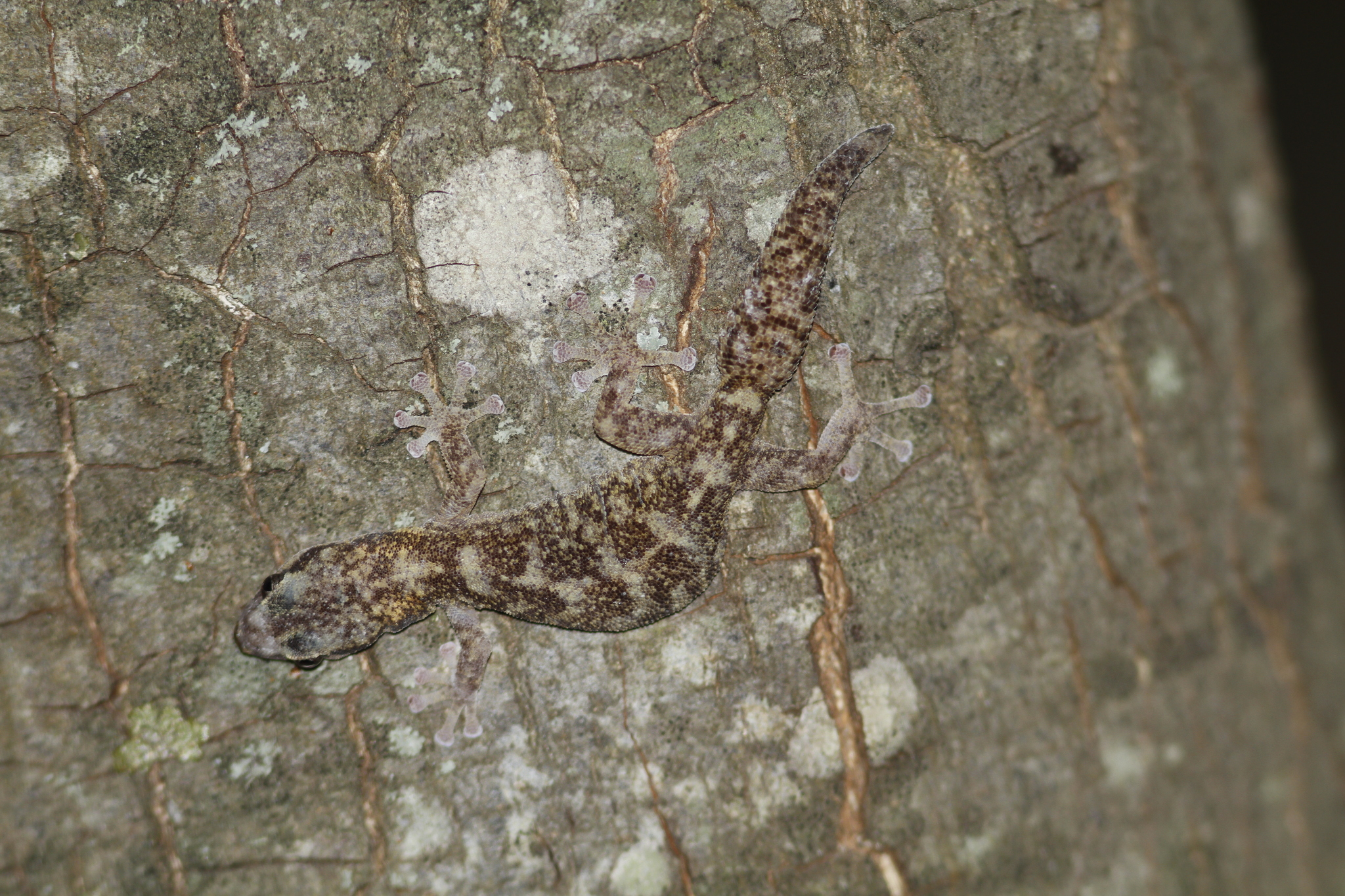

Scientific classification
- Domain: Eukaryota
- Kingdom: Animalia
- Phylum: Chordata
- Class: Reptilia
- Order: Squamata
- Infraorder: Gekkota
- Family: Sphaerodactylidae
- Genus: Euleptes; Fitzinger, 1843

Species
- Euleptes europaea; †Euleptes gallica; †Euleptes klembarai

= Euleptes =

Euleptes Temporal range: Miocene – Recent

Genus of gecko

Euleptes is a genus of geckos represented by the European leaf-toed gecko (Euleptes europaea), the sole extant species.

Two extinct species are known from the Miocene of the France, Czech Republic and Slovakia; E. gallica and E. klembarai.

== See also ==
- Geiseleptes
