= Pseudogonatodes gasconi =

Conservation status
- Least Concern (IUCN 3.1)

Scientific classification
- Kingdom: Animalia
- Phylum: Chordata
- Class: Reptilia
- Order: Squamata
- Suborder: Gekkota
- Family: Sphaerodactylidae
- Genus: Pseudogonatodes
- Species: P. gasconi

Binomial name
- Pseudogonatodes gasconi Ávila-Pires & Hoogmoed, 2000

Species of lizard

Pseudogonatodes gasconi is a species of lizard in the family Sphaerodactylidae. The species is endemic to Brazil.

== Etymology ==
The specific name, gasconi, is in honor of Canadian ecologist Claude Gascon.

== Geographic range ==
P. gasconi is known from the Brazilian state of Acre.

== Habitat ==
The preferred natural habitat of P. gasconi is forest.

== Description ==
The holotype of P. gasconi has a snout-to-vent length of 24 mm (0.94 in), and a tail length of 21 mm (0.83 in).

== Reproduction ==
P. gasconi is oviparous.
