= Coleodactylus elizae =

Scientific classification
- Kingdom: Animalia
- Phylum: Chordata
- Class: Reptilia
- Order: Squamata
- Suborder: Gekkota
- Family: Sphaerodactylidae
- Genus: Coleodactylus
- Species: C. elizae

Binomial name
- Coleodactylus elizae Gonçalves, Torquato, Skuk & Araújo Sena, 2012

Species of lizard

Coleodactylus elizae is a species of gecko, a lizard in the family Sphaerodactylidae. The species is endemic to Brazil.

== Etymology ==
The specific name, elizae, is in honor of Brazilian herpetologist Eliza Maria Xavier Freire.

== Geographic range ==
C. elizae is found in northeastern Brazil in the state of Alagoas.

== Habitat ==
The preferred habitat of C. elizae is forest, where it lives in bromeliads.

== Description ==
The maximum recorded snout-to-vent length (SVL) for C. elizae is 27.4 mm (1.08 in).
