= Lepidoblepharis heyerorum =

Conservation status
- Least Concern (IUCN 3.1)

Scientific classification
- Kingdom: Animalia
- Phylum: Chordata
- Class: Reptilia
- Order: Squamata
- Suborder: Gekkota
- Family: Sphaerodactylidae
- Genus: Lepidoblepharis
- Species: L. heyerorum

Binomial name
- Lepidoblepharis heyerorum Vanzolini, 1978

Species of lizard

Lepidoblepharis heyerorum is a species of gecko, a lizard in the family Sphaerodactylidae. The species is native to northeastern South America.

== Etymology ==
The specific name, heyerorum (genitive, plural), is in honor of American herpetologist William Ronald "Ron" Heyer and his wife Miriam.

== Geographic range ==
L. heyerorum is found in Brazil (Amapá, Amazonas, Pará) and in French Guiana.

== Habitat ==
The preferred natural habitat of L. heyerorum is forest.

== Behavior ==
L. heyerorum is terrestrial and diurnal.

== Reproduction ==
L. heyerorum is oviparous.
