= Lepidoblepharis nukak =

Scientific classification
- Kingdom: Animalia
- Phylum: Chordata
- Class: Reptilia
- Order: Squamata
- Suborder: Gekkota
- Family: Sphaerodactylidae
- Genus: Lepidoblepharis
- Species: L. nukak

Binomial name
- Lepidoblepharis nukak Calderon-Espinosa & Medina-Rangel, 2016

Species of lizard

Lepidoblepharis nukak is a species of gecko, a lizard in the family Sphaerodactylidae. The species is endemic to Colombia.

== Etymology ==
The specific name, nukak, is in honor of the Nukak people of Colombia.

== Geographic range ==
L. nukak is found in Guaviare Department, Colombia.

== Habitat ==
The preferred habitat of L. nakuk is tropical wet forest at an altitude of about 200 m (660 ft).

== Description ==
L. nakuk is a small species of Lepidoblepharis, with a maximum snout-to-vent length (SVL) of 29.3 mm (1.15 in).
