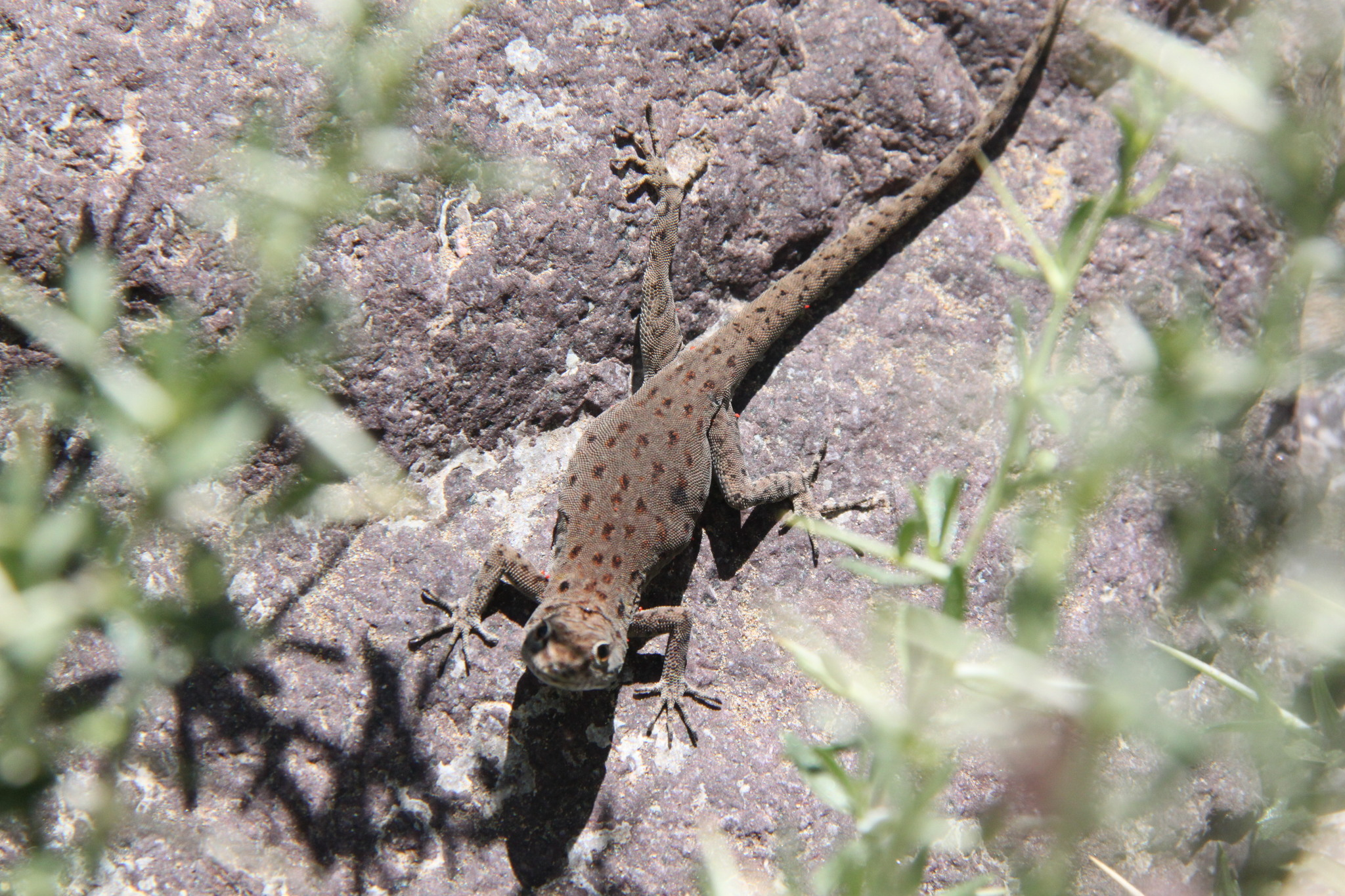

Conservation status
- Least Concern (IUCN 3.1)

Scientific classification
- Kingdom: Animalia
- Phylum: Chordata
- Class: Reptilia
- Order: Squamata
- Suborder: Gekkota
- Family: Sphaerodactylidae
- Genus: Quedenfeldtia
- Species: Q. moerens

Binomial name
- Quedenfeldtia moerens (Chabanaud, 1916)

Synonyms
- Gymnodactylus moerens Chabanaud, 1916; Quedenfeldtia moerens — Arnold, 1990; Pristurus moerens — Rösler, 2018

= Quedenfeldtia moerens =

Species of lizard

Quedenfeldtia moerens, known commonly as the Atlas day gecko, is a species of lizard in the family Sphaerodactylidae. The species is endemic to Morocco.

== Taxonomy ==
This species, Quedenfeldtia moerens, should not be confused with a different species, Q. trachyblepharus, which is also known commonly as the Atlas day gecko.

== Geographic range ==
Q. moerens is found in Morocco. It might also occur in Western Sahara.

== Habitat ==
The natural habitat of Q. moerens is rocky areas.

== Reproduction ==
Q. moerens is oviparous.

== Original publication ==
Chabanaud P (1916). "Sur divers Reptiles et Batraciens du Maroc recueillis par M. Pallary ". Bulletin du Muséum National d'Histoire Naturelle, Paris 22: 228–233. (Gymnodactylus moerens, new species, pp. 228–231, Figures 1, 2A). (in French).
