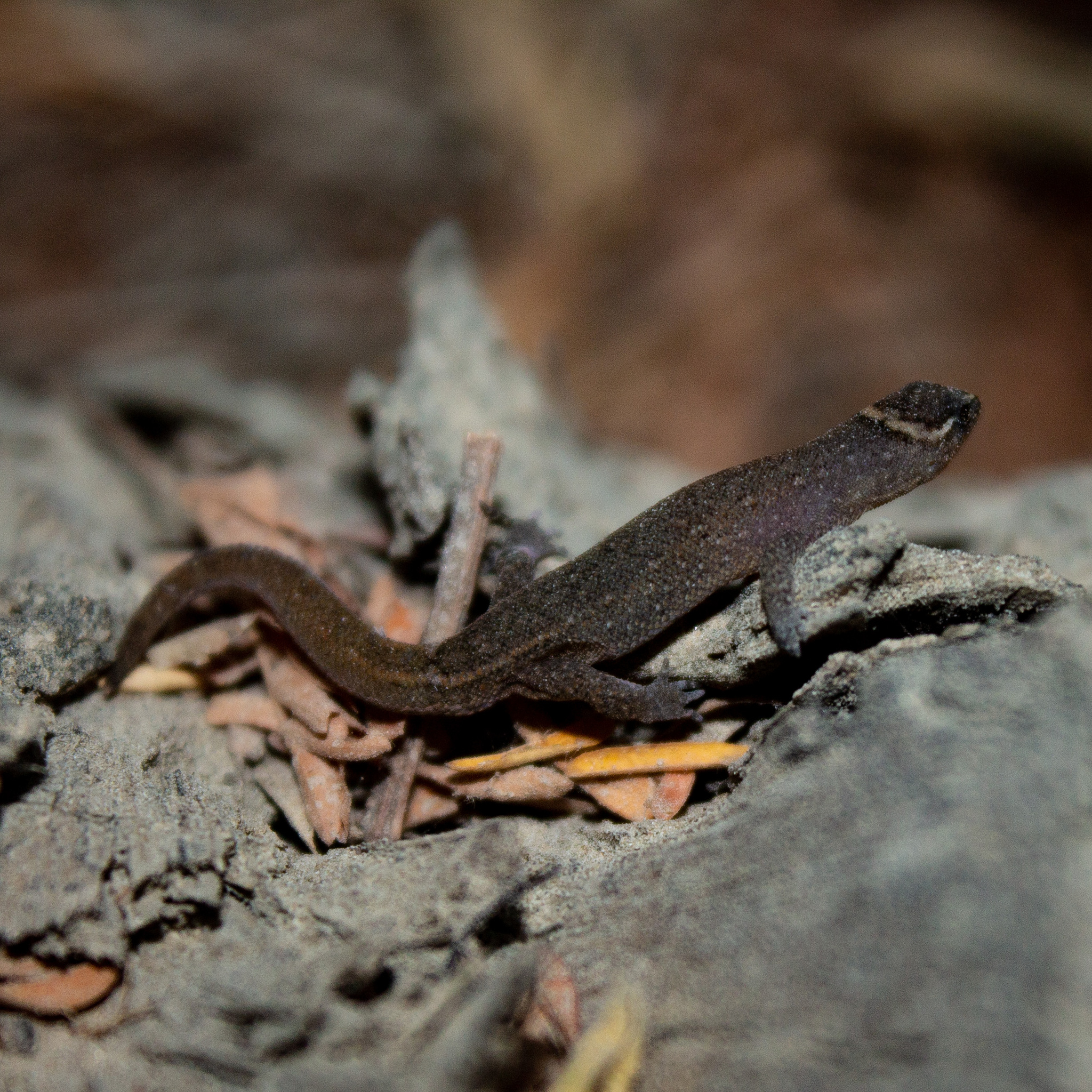

Conservation status
- Least Concern (IUCN 3.1)

Scientific classification
- Kingdom: Animalia
- Phylum: Chordata
- Class: Reptilia
- Order: Squamata
- Suborder: Gekkota
- Family: Sphaerodactylidae
- Genus: Lepidoblepharis
- Species: L. sanctaemartae

Binomial name
- Lepidoblepharis sanctaemartae (Ruthven, 1916)

Synonyms
- Lathrogecko sanctaemartae Ruthven, 1916; Lepidoblepharis sanctaemartae fugax Ruthven, 1928; Lepidoblepharis sanctaemartae — Vanzolini, 1953

= Lepidoblepharis sanctaemartae =

Species of lizard

Lepidoblepharis sanctaemartae is a species of gecko, a lizard in the family Sphaerodactylidae. The species is found in southern Central America and northern South America.

== Etymology ==
The specific name, sanctaemartae, refers to the Santa Marta Mountains (Sierra Nevada de Santa Marta) of Colombia, where the holotype was collected.

== Geographic range ==
L. sanctaemartae is found in Colombia, Panama, and Venezuela.

== Habitat ==
The preferred natural habitat of L. sanctaemartae is forest, at altitudes of 0–600 m (0–1,969 ft).

== Reproduction ==
L. sanctaemartae is oviparous.
