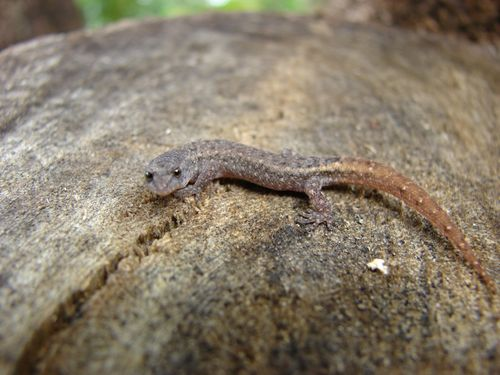

Scientific classification
- Kingdom: Animalia
- Phylum: Chordata
- Class: Reptilia
- Order: Squamata
- Suborder: Gekkota
- Family: Sphaerodactylidae
- Genus: Coleodactylus
- Species: C. brachystoma

Binomial name
- Coleodactylus brachystoma (Amaral, 1935)

Synonyms
- Homonota brachystoma Amaral, 1935; Sphaerodactylus pfrimeri Miranda-Ribeiro, 1937; Coleodactylus brachystoma — Wermuth, 1965

= Goias gecko =

Species of lizard

The Goias gecko (Coleodactylus brachystoma) is a species of lizard in the family Sphaerodactylidae. The species is endemic to Brazil.

== Geographic range ==
C. brachystoma is found in the Brazilian states of Goiás, Mato Grosso, and Piauí.

== Reproduction ==
C. brachystoma is oviparous.
