= Lepidoblepharis colombianus =

Conservation status
- Data Deficient (IUCN 3.1)

Scientific classification
- Kingdom: Animalia
- Phylum: Chordata
- Class: Reptilia
- Order: Squamata
- Suborder: Gekkota
- Family: Sphaerodactylidae
- Genus: Lepidoblepharis
- Species: L. colombianus

Binomial name
- Lepidoblepharis colombianus Mechler, 1968

Synonyms
- Lepidoblepharis festae colombianus Mechler, 1968; Lepidoblepharis colombianus — Vanzolini, 1978

Species of lizard

Lepidoblepharis colombianus is a species of gecko, a lizard in the family Sphaerodactylidae. The species is endemic to Colombia.

== Geographic range ==
L. colombianus is found in Cundinamarca Department, Colombia, at an altitude of 1,600 m (5,200 ft).

== Reproduction ==
L. colombianus is oviparous.
