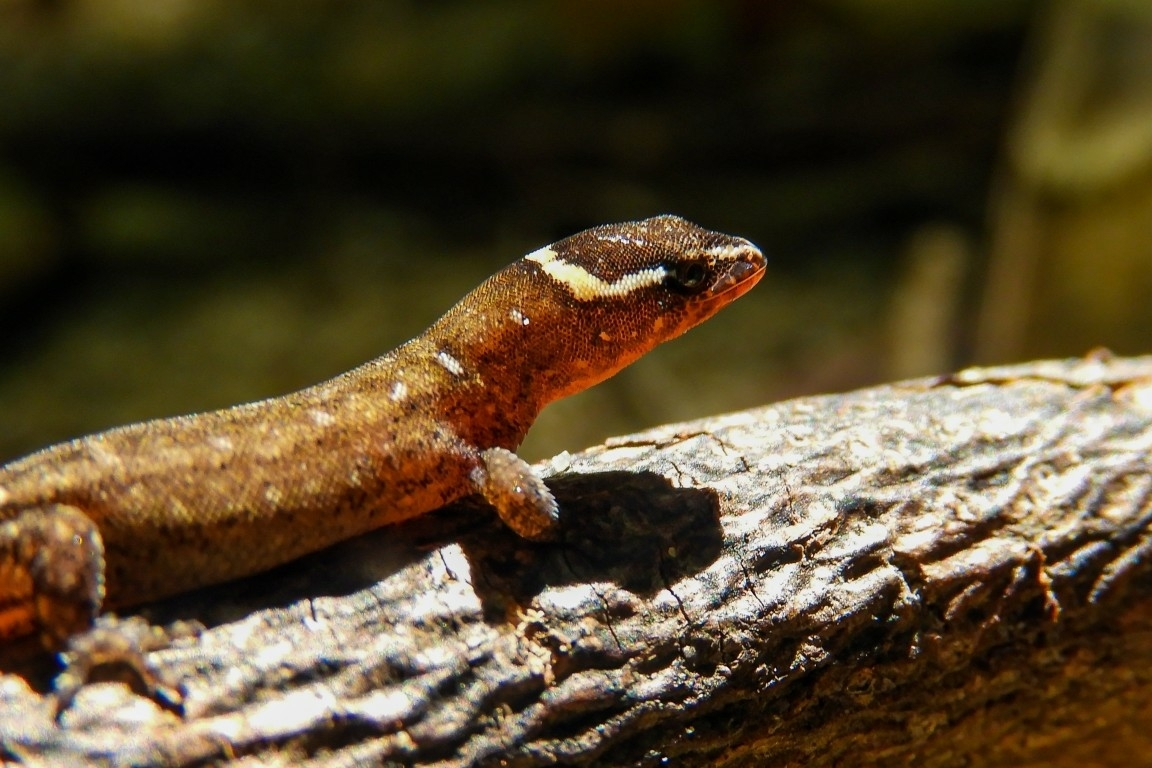

Conservation status
- Critically Endangered (IUCN 3.1)

Scientific classification
- Kingdom: Animalia
- Phylum: Chordata
- Class: Reptilia
- Order: Squamata
- Suborder: Gekkota
- Family: Sphaerodactylidae
- Genus: Lepidoblepharis
- Species: L. miyatai

Binomial name
- Lepidoblepharis miyatai Lamar, 1985

= Lepidoblepharis miyatai =

Species of lizard

Lepidoblepharis miyatai is a species of gecko, a lizard in the family Sphaerodactylidae. The species is endemic to Colombia.

== Etymology ==
The specific name, miyatai, is in honor of American herpetologist Kenneth Ichiro Miyata (1951–1983).

== Geographic range ==
L. miyatai is found in Magdalena Department, Colombia.

== Description ==
The holotype of Lepidoblepharis miyatai has a snout-to-vent length (SVL) of 20 mm (0.79 in) and a broken tail.

== Habitat ==
Lepidoblepharis miyatai is a unique sphaerodactyline gecko which occurs in dry coastal thorn forest of the Department of Magdalena, northern Colombia (Lamar 1985).

== Reproduction ==
L. miyatai is oviparous.
