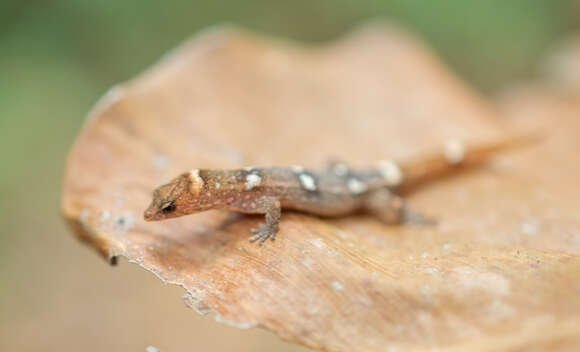

Conservation status
- Least Concern (IUCN 3.1)

Scientific classification
- Kingdom: Animalia
- Phylum: Chordata
- Class: Reptilia
- Order: Squamata
- Suborder: Gekkota
- Family: Sphaerodactylidae
- Genus: Coleodactylus
- Species: C. septentrionalis

Binomial name
- Coleodactylus septentrionalis Vanzolini, 1980

= Ilha Maracá gecko =

Ilha Maracá gecko (Coleodactylus septentrionalis)

Species of lizard

The Ilha Maracá gecko (Coleodactylus septentrionalis) is a species of lizard in the family Sphaerodactylidae. The species is endemic to northern South America.

== Geographic range ==
C. septentrionalis is found in Brazil (Roraima state), Guyana, Suriname (Nickerie District), and Venezuela (Delta Amacuro and Monagas states).

== Reproduction ==
C. septentrionalis is oviparous.
