= Venezuela clawed gecko =

Conservation status
- Least Concern (IUCN 3.1)

Scientific classification
- Kingdom: Animalia
- Phylum: Chordata
- Class: Reptilia
- Order: Squamata
- Suborder: Gekkota
- Family: Sphaerodactylidae
- Genus: Pseudogonatodes
- Species: P. lunulatus

Binomial name
- Pseudogonatodes lunulatus (Roux, 1927)

Species of lizard

The Venezuela clawed gecko (Pseudogonatodes lunulatus) is a species of lizard in the family Sphaerodactylidae. It is endemic to Venezuela.
