= Pseudogonatodes manessi =

Conservation status
- Least Concern (IUCN 3.1)

Scientific classification
- Kingdom: Animalia
- Phylum: Chordata
- Class: Reptilia
- Order: Squamata
- Suborder: Gekkota
- Family: Sphaerodactylidae
- Genus: Pseudogonatodes
- Species: P. manessi

Binomial name
- Pseudogonatodes manessi Ávila-Pires & Hoogmoed, 2000

Species of lizard

Pseudogonatodes manessi is a species of lizard in the family Sphaerodactylidae. The species is endemic to Venezuela.

== Etymology ==
The specific name, manessi is in honor of American herpetologist Scott Jay Maness (1948–1981), who died fighting a wildfire in Florida.

== Geographic range ==
Pseudogonatodes manessi is found in the Venezuelan states of Aragua and Miranda.

== Habitat ==
The preferred natural habitat of Pseudogonatodes manessi is forest, at altitudes of 500–1,330 m (1,640–4,360 ft).

== Description ==
Pseudogonatodes manessi may attain a snout-to-vent length (SVL) of 38 mm (1.5 in). Dorsally, it is dark brown. Ventrally, it is dark gray.

== Behavior ==
Pseudogonatodes manessi is terrestrial.

== Reproduction ==
Pseudogonatodes manessi is oviparous.
