= Peru clawed gecko =

Conservation status
- Near Threatened (IUCN 3.1)

Scientific classification
- Kingdom: Animalia
- Phylum: Chordata
- Class: Reptilia
- Order: Squamata
- Suborder: Gekkota
- Family: Sphaerodactylidae
- Genus: Pseudogonatodes
- Species: P. peruvianus

Binomial name
- Pseudogonatodes peruvianus Huey & Dixon, 1970

Species of lizard

The Peru clawed gecko (Pseudogonatodes peruvianus) is a species of lizard in the Sphaerodactylidae family found in Peru and Colombia.
