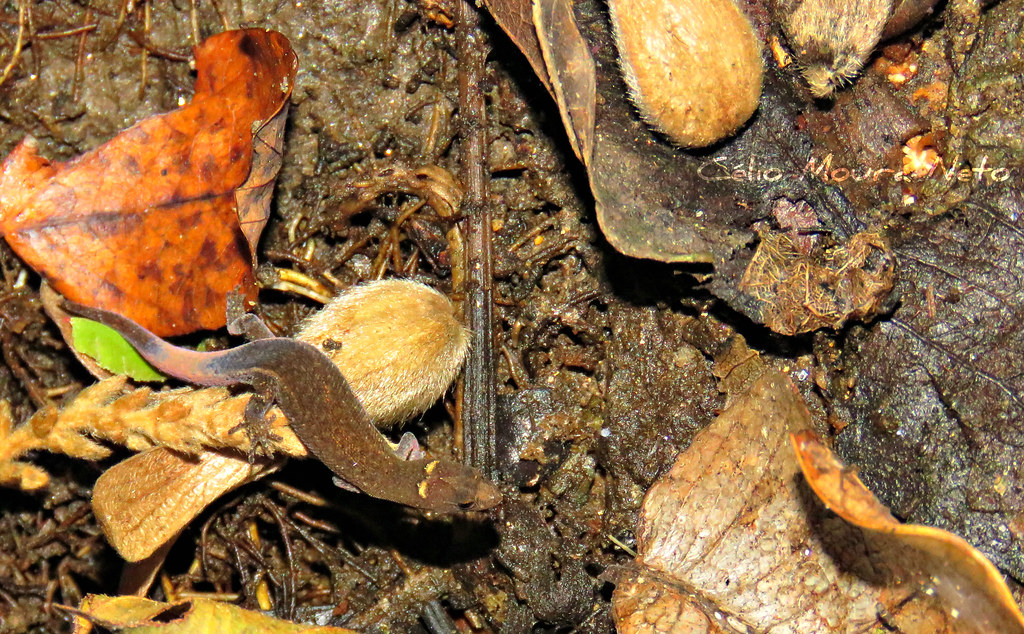

Scientific classification
- Kingdom: Animalia
- Phylum: Chordata
- Class: Reptilia
- Order: Squamata
- Suborder: Gekkota
- Family: Sphaerodactylidae
- Genus: Coleodactylus
- Species: C. meridionalis

Binomial name
- Coleodactylus meridionalis (Boulenger, 1888)

Synonyms
- Sphaerodactylus meridionalis Boulenger, 1888; Coleodactylus meridionalis — Parker, 1926

= Meridian gecko =

Species of lizard

The meridian gecko (Coleodactylus meridionalis) is a species of lizard in the family Sphaerodactylidae. The species is endemic to Brazil.

== Geographic range ==
C. meridionalis has been recorded from the Brazilian states of Bahia, Ceará, Pará, Paraíba, Pernambuco, and Sergipe.

== Description ==
C. meridionalis may attain a snout-to-vent length (SVL) of 28 mm (1.1 in). The pupil of the eye is round.

== Behavior ==
C. meridionalis is diurnal.

== Reproduction ==
C. meridionalis is oviparous.

== As prey ==
C. meridionalis is preyed upon by the spider Centroctenus brevipes.
