= Lepidoblepharis hoogmoedi =

Conservation status
- Least Concern (IUCN 3.1)

Scientific classification
- Kingdom: Animalia
- Phylum: Chordata
- Class: Reptilia
- Order: Squamata
- Suborder: Gekkota
- Family: Sphaerodactylidae
- Genus: Lepidoblepharis
- Species: L. hoogmoedi

Binomial name
- Lepidoblepharis hoogmoedi Ávila-Pires, 1995

Species of lizard

Lepidoblepharis hoogmoedi, also known commonly as Hoogmoed's scaly-eyed gecko and the spotted dwarf gecko, is a species of gecko, a lizard in the family Sphaerodactylidae. The species is native to northern South America.

== Etymology ==
The specific name, hoogmoedi, is in honor of Dutch herpetologist Marinus Steven Hoogmoed (born 1942).

== Geographic range ==
L. hoogmoedi is found in northwestern Brazil (Amazonas) and northern Peru.

== Habitat ==
The preferred natural habitat of L. hoogmoedi is forest.

== Description ==
L. hoogmoedi may attain a snout-to-vent length (SVL) of 3.8 cm (1.5 in).

== Behavior ==
L. hoogmoedi is diurnal and terrestrial, living in the leaf litter of the forest.

== Reproduction ==
L. hoogmoedi is oviparous.
