= Lepidoblepharis victormartinezi =

Scientific classification
- Kingdom: Animalia
- Phylum: Chordata
- Class: Reptilia
- Order: Squamata
- Suborder: Gekkota
- Family: Sphaerodactylidae
- Genus: Lepidoblepharis
- Species: L. victormartinezi

Binomial name
- Lepidoblepharis victormartinezi Batista, Ponce, Vesely, Mebert, Hertz, G. Köhler, Carrizo & Lotzkat, 2015

Species of lizard

Lepidoblepharis victormartinezi is a species of gecko, a lizard in the family Sphaerodactylidae. The species is endemic to Panama.

== Etymology ==
The specific name, victormartinezi, is in honor of Panamanian herpetologist Victor Martínez Cortés.

== Geographic range ==
L. victormartinezi is found in Colón Province, Panamá.

== Description ==
The snout-to-vent length (SVL) of adults of L. victormartinezi is 25–27 mm (0.98–1.06 in).
