= Lepidoblepharis ruthveni =

Conservation status
- Least Concern (IUCN 3.1)

Scientific classification
- Kingdom: Animalia
- Phylum: Chordata
- Class: Reptilia
- Order: Squamata
- Suborder: Gekkota
- Family: Sphaerodactylidae
- Genus: Lepidoblepharis
- Species: L. ruthveni

Binomial name
- Lepidoblepharis ruthveni Parker, 1926

Species of lizard

Lepidoblepharis ruthveni is a species of gecko, a lizard in the family Sphaerodactylidae. The species is endemic to northwestern South America.

== Etymology ==
The specific name, ruthveni, is in honor of American herpetologist Alexander Grant Ruthven.

== Geographic range ==
L. ruthveni is found in Colombia and Ecuador.

== Habitat ==
The preferred natural habitat of L. ruthveni is forest.

== Reproduction ==
L. ruthveni is oviparous.
