= Paraguanan ground gecko =

Conservation status
- Least Concern (IUCN 3.1)

Scientific classification
- Kingdom: Animalia
- Phylum: Chordata
- Class: Reptilia
- Order: Squamata
- Suborder: Gekkota
- Family: Sphaerodactylidae
- Genus: Lepidoblepharis
- Species: L. montecanoensis

Binomial name
- Lepidoblepharis montecanoensis Markezich & Taphorn, 1994

Species of lizard

The Paraguanan ground gecko or Monte Cano dwarf gecko (Lepidoblepharis montecanoensis) is a species of lizard in the family Sphaerodactylidae.

== Geographic range and habitat ==
L. montecanoensis is endemic to the Paraguaná Peninsula, Falcón State, northern Venezuela, and may be restricted to tropical dry forest habitats.

== Etymology ==
L. montecanoensis is named after the type locality, Monte Cano.

== Description ==
L. montecanoensis is a small gecko: the holotype measures 19 mm (0.75 in) in snout–vent length (SVL), with a tail almost as long.

== Reproduction ==
L. montecanoensis is oviparous.

== Conservation status ==
Most specimens of L. montecanoensis have been collected from the Monte Cano Reserve. Livestock are grazing within the reserve, potentially leading to habitat fragmentation. Also the expanding human population and infrastructure development in the area are threats to this species. However, too little is known about this species for a more accurate assessment.
