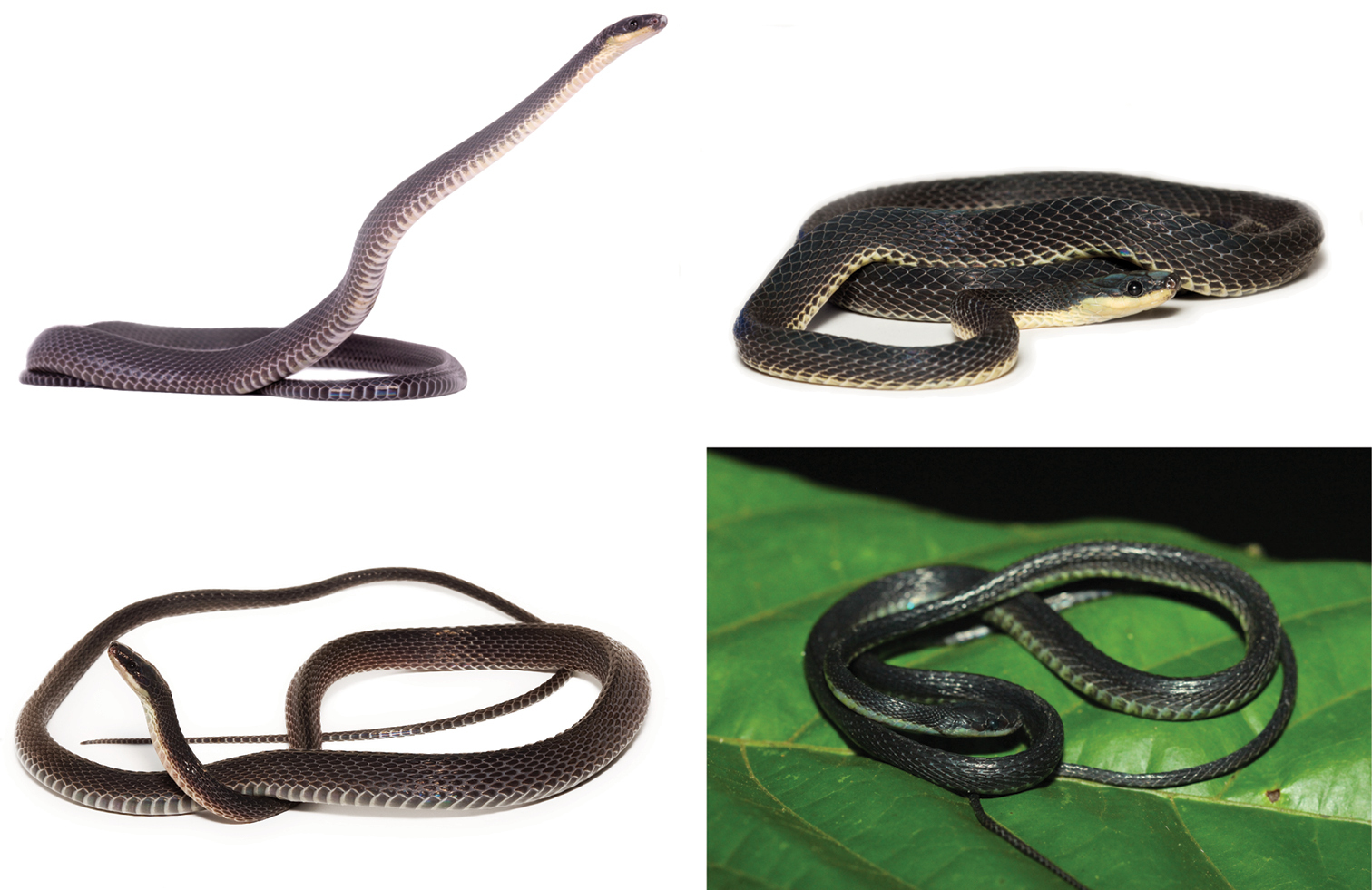

Scientific classification
- Kingdom: Animalia
- Phylum: Chordata
- Class: Reptilia
- Order: Squamata
- Suborder: Serpentes
- Family: Colubridae
- Subfamily: Dipsadinae
- Genus: Synophis; Peracca, 1896

= Synophis =

Genus of snakes

Synophis is a genus of snakes in the subfamily Dipsadinae of the family Colubridae. The genus is native to northwestern South America.

== Description ==
Snakes of the genus Synophis have unusual scalation on the top of the head. The internasal scales are very small, and the prefrontal scales are fused into one large plate.

== Species ==
The genus Synophis contains the following nine species which are recognized as being valid.

- Synophis bicolor Peracca, 1896 – bicolored shadow snake, two-colored fishing snake
- Synophis bogerti Torres-Carvajal, Echevarría, Venegas, Chávez & Camper, 2015 – Bogert's shadow snake
- Synophis calamitus Hillis, 1990 – calamitous shadow snake
- Synophis insulomontanus Torres-Carvajal, Echevarría, Venegas, Chávez & Camper, 2015 – mountain shadow snake
- Synophis lasallei (Nicéforo-María, 1950) – La Salle's shadow snake
- Synophis niceforomariae Pyron, Arteaga, Echevarría & Torres-Carvajal, 2016 – Nicéforo María's shadow snake
- Synophis plectovertebralis Sheil & T. Grant, 2001 – braided shadow snake
- Synophis zaheri Pyron, Guayasamin, Peñafiel, Bustamante & Arteaga, 2015 – Zaher's shadow snake
- Synophis zamora Torres-Carvajal, Echevarría, Venegas, Chávez & Camper, 2015 – Zamoran shadow snake

Nota bene: A binomial authority in parentheses indicates that the species was originally described in a genus other than Synophis.
