= Lepidoblepharis intermedius =

Conservation status
- Least Concern (IUCN 3.1)

Scientific classification
- Kingdom: Animalia
- Phylum: Chordata
- Class: Reptilia
- Order: Squamata
- Suborder: Gekkota
- Family: Sphaerodactylidae
- Genus: Lepidoblepharis
- Species: L. intermedius

Binomial name
- Lepidoblepharis intermedius Boulenger, 1914

Species of lizard

Lepidoblepharis intermedius is a species of gecko, a lizard in the family Sphaerodactylidae. The species is endemic to northern South America.

== Geographic range ==
L. intermedius is found in Colombia and Ecuador.

== Description ==
Dorsally, L. intermedius is brown with darker and lighter variegations. There is a straight whitish streak across the nape of the neck. Ventrally it is pale brown, except for the throat which is whitish. It may attain a snout-to-vent length (SVL) of 29 mm (1.1 in), and have a tail 34 mm (1.3 in) long.

== Reproduction ==
L. intermedius is oviparous.
