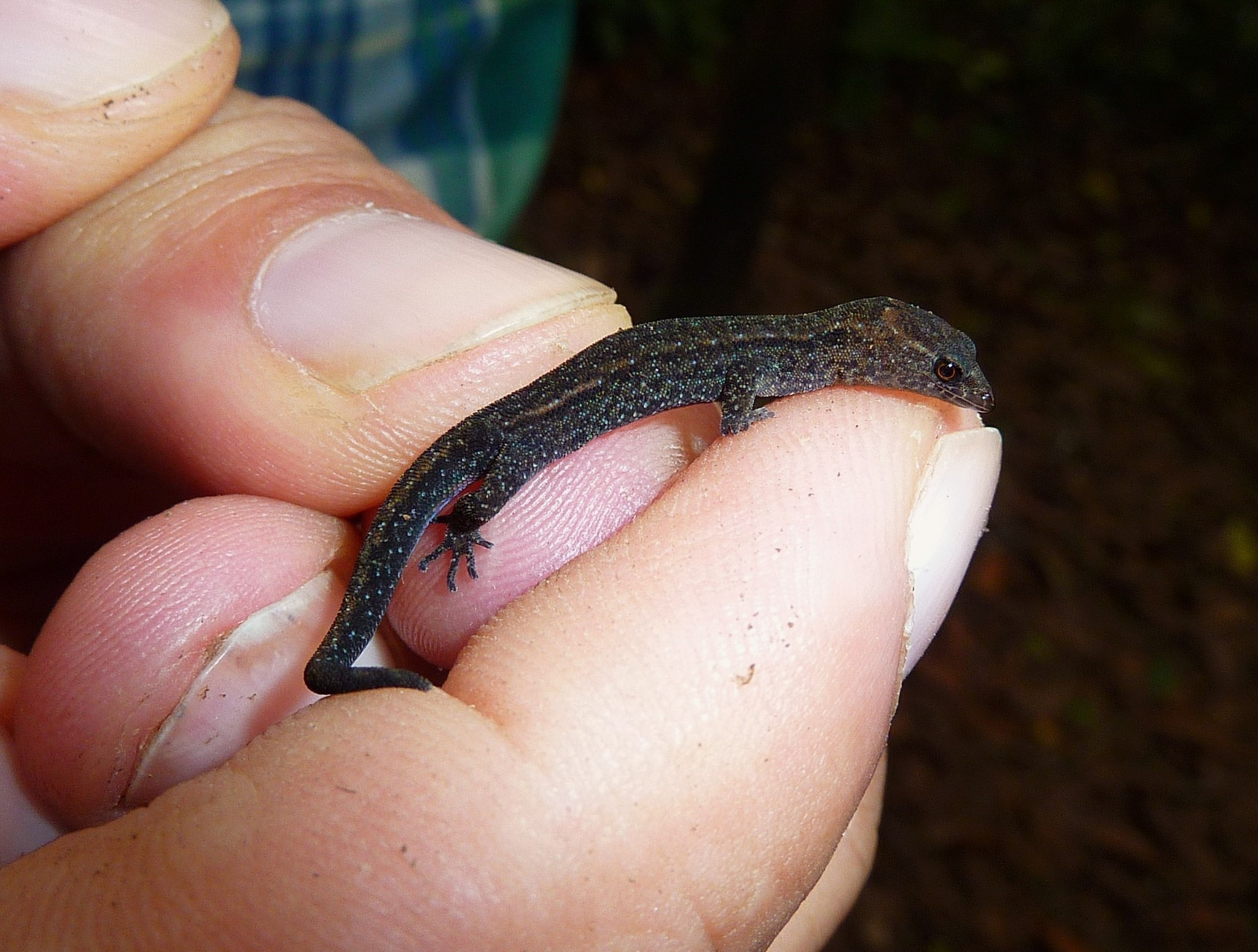

Conservation status
- Least Concern (IUCN 3.1)

Scientific classification
- Kingdom: Animalia
- Phylum: Chordata
- Class: Reptilia
- Order: Squamata
- Suborder: Gekkota
- Family: Sphaerodactylidae
- Genus: Lepidoblepharis
- Species: L. duolepis

Binomial name
- Lepidoblepharis duolepis Ayala & Castro, 1983

= Lepidoblepharis duolepis =

Species of lizard

Lepidoblepharis duolepis is a species of gecko, a lizard in the family Sphaerodactylidae. The species is endemic to Colombia.

== Geographic range ==
L. duolepis is found in Antioquia Department and Valle del Cauca Department, Colombia.

== Reproduction ==
L. duolepis is oviparous.
