= Lepidoblepharis rufigularis =

Scientific classification
- Kingdom: Animalia
- Phylum: Chordata
- Class: Reptilia
- Order: Squamata
- Suborder: Gekkota
- Family: Sphaerodactylidae
- Genus: Lepidoblepharis
- Species: L. rufigularis

Binomial name
- Lepidoblepharis rufigularis Batista, Ponce, Vesely, Mebert, Hertz, G. Köhler, Carrizo & Lotzkat, 2015

Species of lizard

Lepidoblepharis rufigularis is a species of gecko, a lizard in the family Sphaerodactylidae. The species is endemic to Panama.

== Geographic range ==
L. rufigularis is found in Darién Province, Panama.

== Description ==
The male of L. rufigularis has a reddish throat, to which the specific name refers (rufus = red + gula = throat). The holotype has a snout-to-vent length (SVL) of 25 mm (0.98 in).
