= Lepidoblepharis emberawoundule =

Scientific classification
- Kingdom: Animalia
- Phylum: Chordata
- Class: Reptilia
- Order: Squamata
- Suborder: Gekkota
- Family: Sphaerodactylidae
- Genus: Lepidoblepharis
- Species: L. emberawoundule

Binomial name
- Lepidoblepharis emberawoundule Batista, Ponce, Vesely, Mebert, Hertz, G. Köhler, Carrizo & Lotzkat, 2015

Species of lizard

Lepidoblepharis emberawoundule is a species of gecko, a lizard in the family Sphaerodactylidae. The species is endemic to Panama.

== Etymology ==
The specific name, emberawoundule, is a compound word in honor of three indigenous peoples of Panama: the Emberá, the Wounaan, and the Guna. The Guna call themselves Dule meaning "people".

== Geographic range ==
L. emberawoundule is found in Comarga Guna Yala, an indigenous province in northeastern Panama.
