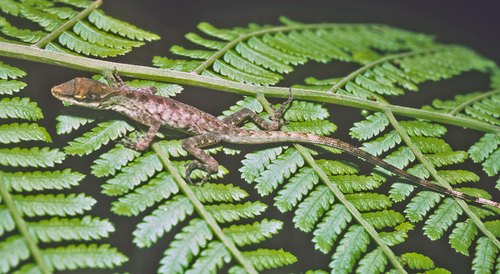

Conservation status
- Least Concern (IUCN 3.1)

Scientific classification
- Kingdom: Animalia
- Phylum: Chordata
- Class: Reptilia
- Order: Squamata
- Suborder: Iguania
- Family: Anolidae
- Genus: Anolis
- Species: A. peraccae

Binomial name
- Anolis peraccae Boulenger, 1898

Synonyms
- Dactyloa peraccae (Boulenger, 1898); Anolis irregularis F. Werner, 1901

= Anolis peraccae =

Species of lizard

Anolis peraccae is a species of lizard in the family Anolidae. The species is native to extreme northwestern South America.

== Etymology ==
The specific name, peraccae, is in honor of Italian herpetologist Mario Giacinto Peracca.

== Geographic distribution ==
Anolis peraccae is found in Colombia (Nariño) and Ecuador (Imbabura, Los Ríos, Manabí, Pichincha, Santo Domingo de los Tsáchilas).

== Habitat ==
The preferred natural habitat of Anolis peraccae is forest, at elevations from near sea level to 1,200 m (3,900 ft).

== Reproduction ==
Anolis peraccae is oviparous.
