= Brown dwarf gecko =

Scientific classification
- Kingdom: Animalia
- Phylum: Chordata
- Class: Reptilia
- Order: Squamata
- Suborder: Gekkota
- Family: Sphaerodactylidae
- Genus: Lepidoblepharis
- Species: L. festae

Binomial name
- Lepidoblepharis festae (Peracca, 1897)

Synonyms
- Lepidodactylus festae Peracca, 1897; Lepidoblepharis festae — Vanzolini, 1953

Species of lizard

The brown dwarf gecko (Lepidoblepharis festae), also known commonly as the Amazonian scaly-eyed gecko, is a species of lizard in the family Sphaerodactylidae. The species is endemic to north-western South America.

== Etymology ==
The specific name, festae, is in honor of Italian zoologist Enrico Festa.

== Geographic range ==
L. festae is found in Colombia, Ecuador, and Peru.

== Reproduction ==
L. festae is oviparous.
