= Barbour's clawed gecko =

Conservation status
- Near Threatened (IUCN 3.1)

Scientific classification
- Kingdom: Animalia
- Phylum: Chordata
- Class: Reptilia
- Order: Squamata
- Suborder: Gekkota
- Family: Sphaerodactylidae
- Genus: Pseudogonatodes
- Species: P. barbouri

Binomial name
- Pseudogonatodes barbouri (Noble, 1921)

Synonyms
- Lepidoblepharis barbouri Noble, 1921; Pseudogonatodes barbouri — Parker, 1926

Species of lizard

Barbour's clawed gecko (Pseudogonatodes barbouri) is a species of lizard in the family Sphaerodactylidae. The species is endemic to Peru.

== Etymology ==
The specific name, barbouri, is in honor of American herpetologist Thomas Barbour.

== Geographic range ==
P. barbouri is found in northwestern Peru.

== Habitat ==
The preferred natural habitat of P. barbouri is forest.

== Reproduction ==
P. barbouri is oviparous.
