= Lepidoblepharis microlepis =

Conservation status
- Data Deficient (IUCN 3.1)

Scientific classification
- Kingdom: Animalia
- Phylum: Chordata
- Class: Reptilia
- Order: Squamata
- Suborder: Gekkota
- Family: Sphaerodactylidae
- Genus: Lepidoblepharis
- Species: L. microlepis

Binomial name
- Lepidoblepharis microlepis (Noble, 1923)

Synonyms
- Lathrogecko microlepis Noble, 1923; Lepidoblepharis microlepis — Vanzolini, 1953

Species of lizard

Lepidoblepharis microlepis is a species of gecko, a lizard in the family Sphaerodactylidae. The species is endemic to Colombia.

== Geographic range ==
L. microlepis is found in Valle del Cauca Department, Colombia.

== Reproduction ==
L. microlepis is oviparous.
