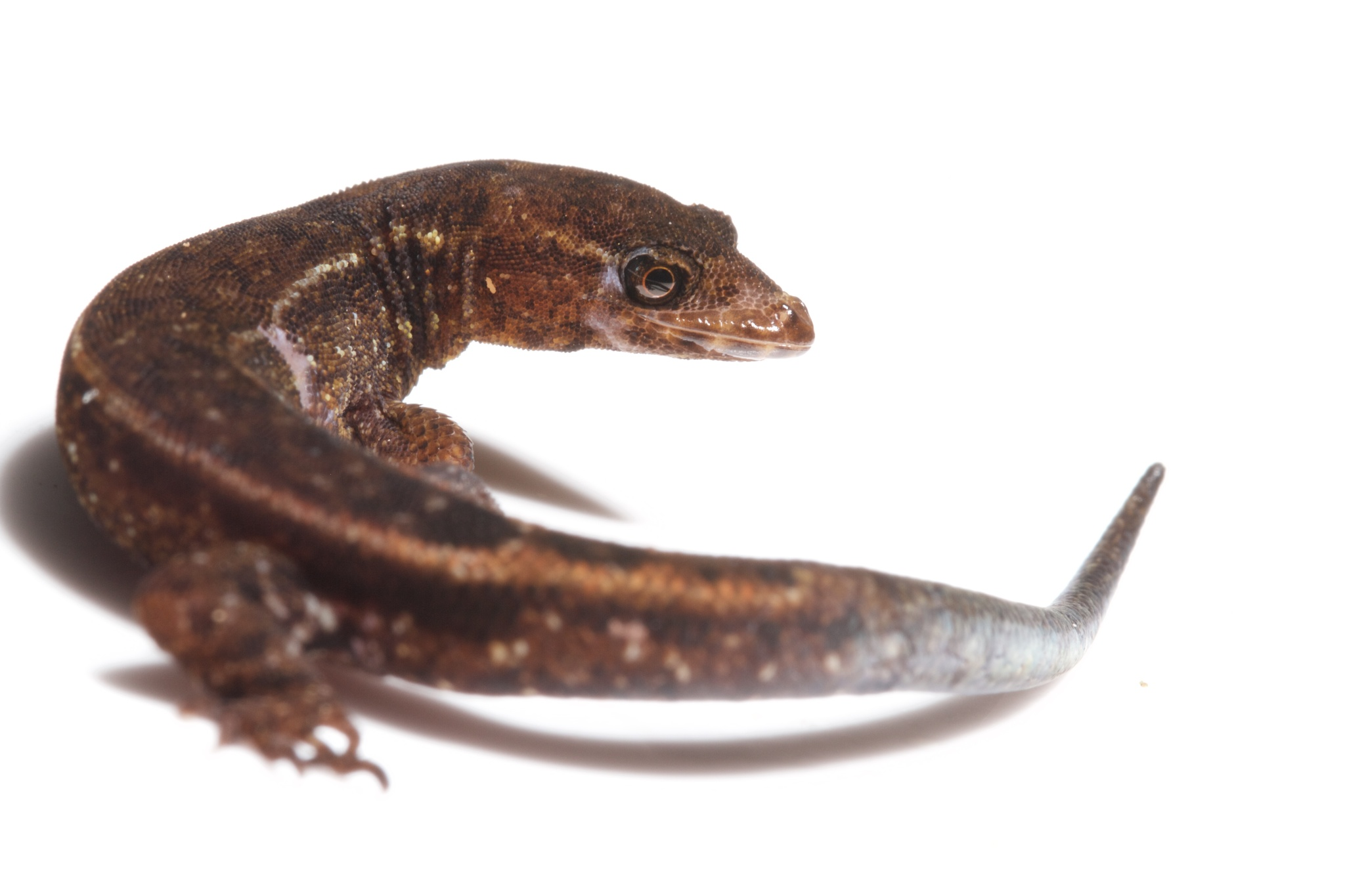

Conservation status
- Least Concern (IUCN 3.1)

Scientific classification
- Kingdom: Animalia
- Phylum: Chordata
- Class: Reptilia
- Order: Squamata
- Suborder: Gekkota
- Family: Sphaerodactylidae
- Genus: Lepidoblepharis
- Species: L. xanthostigma

Binomial name
- Lepidoblepharis xanthostigma (Noble, 1916)

Synonyms
- Lathrogecko xanthostigma Noble, 1916; Lepidoblepharis xanthostigma — Vanzolini, 1953

= Lepidoblepharis xanthostigma =

Species of lizard

Lepidoblepharis xanthostigma, also known as the yellow-spotted gecko, is a species of gecko, a lizard in the family Sphaerodactylidae. The species is found in Central America and north-western South America.

== Geographic range ==
L. xanthostigma is found in Nicaragua, Costa Rica, Panama, and Colombia.

== Reproduction ==
L. xanthostigma is oviparous.
