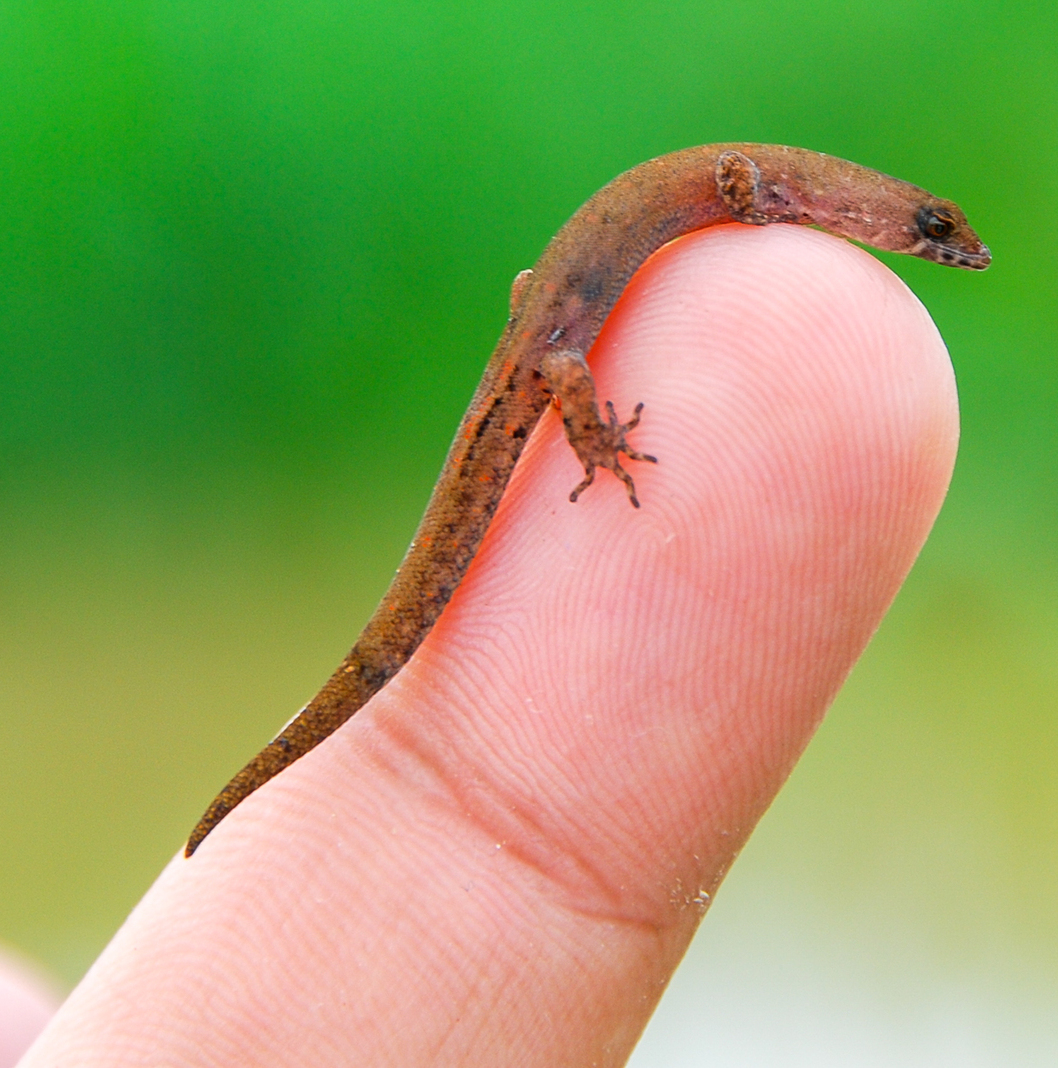

Scientific classification
- Domain: Eukaryota
- Kingdom: Animalia
- Phylum: Chordata
- Class: Reptilia
- Order: Squamata
- Infraorder: Gekkota
- Family: Sphaerodactylidae
- Genus: Pseudogonatodes
- Species: P. guianensis

Binomial name
- Pseudogonatodes guianensis Parker, 1935

= Amazon pygmy gecko =

Species of lizard

The Amazon pygmy gecko (Pseudogonatodes guianensis) is a species of lizard in the Sphaerodactylidae family found in northern South America in Colombia, Venezuela, the Guianas (Guyana, French Guiana, Suriname), Brazil, Ecuador, and northern Peru.

== Gallery ==
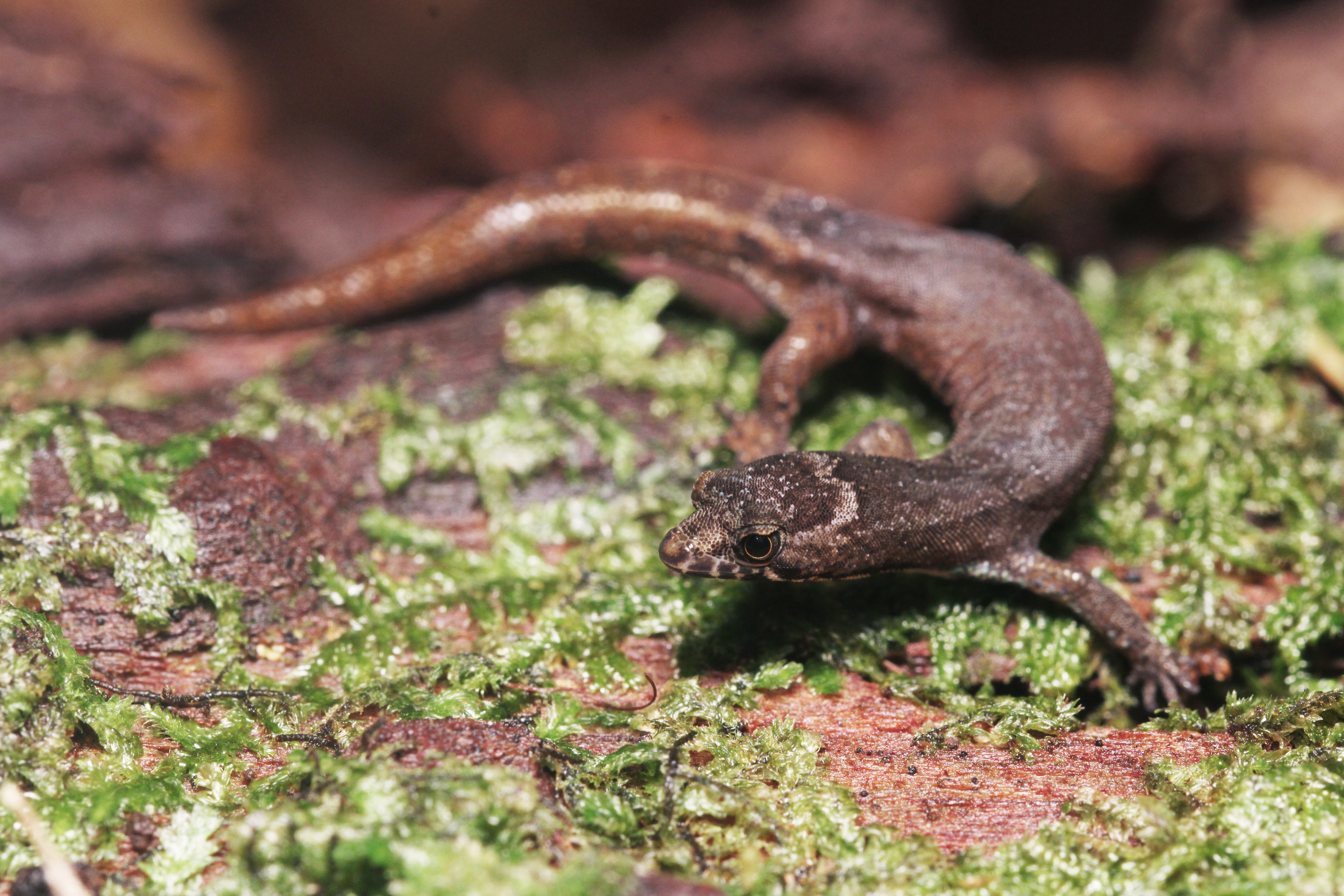

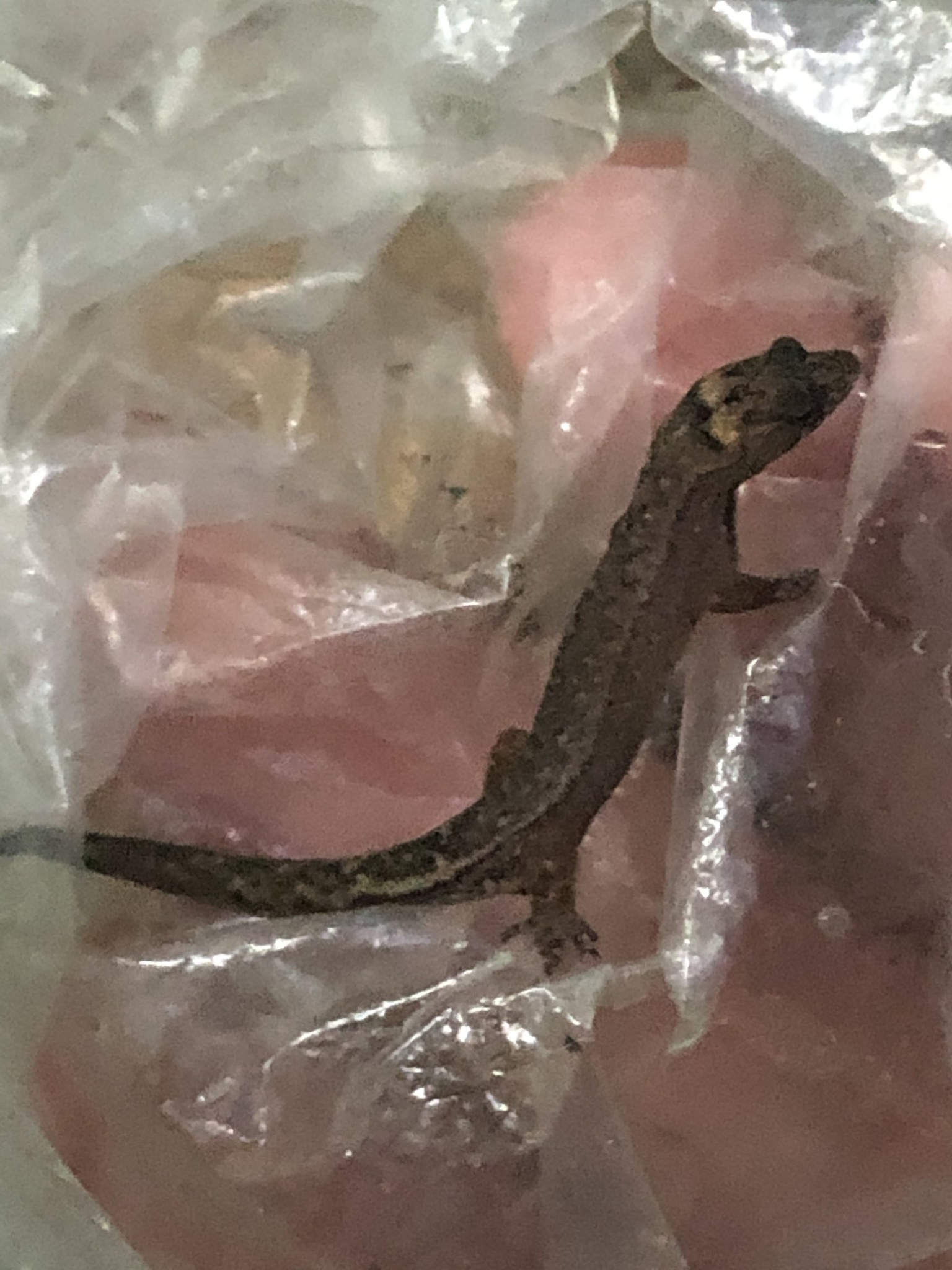
