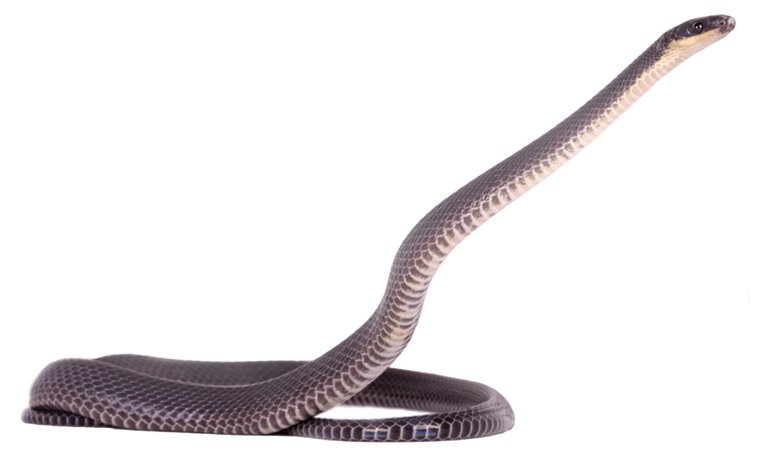

Conservation status
- Data Deficient (IUCN 3.1)

Scientific classification
- Kingdom: Animalia
- Phylum: Chordata
- Class: Reptilia
- Order: Squamata
- Suborder: Serpentes
- Family: Colubridae
- Genus: Synophis
- Species: S. calamitus

Binomial name
- Synophis calamitus Hillis, 1990

= Synophis calamitus =

Species of snake

Synophis calamitus, the calamitous shadow snake, is a species of snake in the family Colubridae. The species is endemic to northwestern South America.

== Geographic range ==
S. calamitus is found in Pichincha Province, Ecuador.

== Description ==
The holotype of Synophis calamitus, a juvenile female, measures 223 mm (8.8 inches) in total length, which includes a tail of 74 mm (2.9 inches). The back and sides of this specimen are iridescent black. The belly is cream, and the undersurface of the tail is dark gray.

== Habitat ==
The preferred habitat of S. calamitus is cloud forests north of the Río Toachi at altitudes of 1,900–2,200 m (6,200–7,200 ft).

== Diet ==
The diet of S. calamitus is unknown.

== Reproduction ==
S. calamitus is oviparous.
