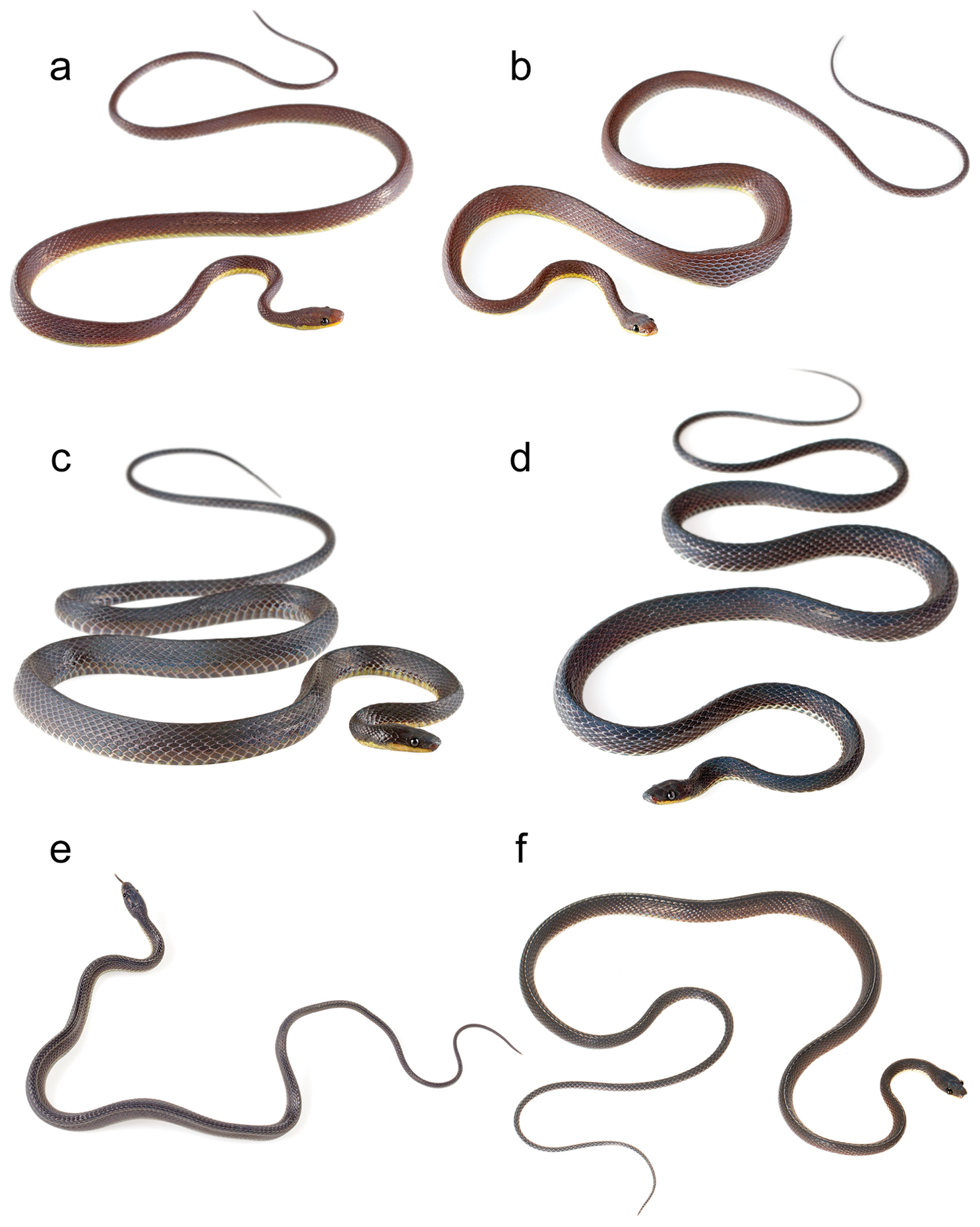
- a = Synophis zaheri

Conservation status
- Vulnerable (IUCN 3.1)

Scientific classification
- Kingdom: Animalia
- Phylum: Chordata
- Class: Reptilia
- Order: Squamata
- Suborder: Serpentes
- Family: Colubridae
- Genus: Synophis
- Species: S. zaheri

Binomial name
- Synophis zaheri Pyron, Guayasamin, Peñafiel, Bustamante & Arteaga, 2015

= Synophis zaheri =

Species of snake

Synophis zaheri, also known as Zaher's shadow snake, is a species of snake in the family, Colubridae. It is found in Ecuador.
