= Synophis plectovertebralis =

Conservation status
- Critically Endangered (IUCN 3.1)

Scientific classification
- Kingdom: Animalia
- Phylum: Chordata
- Class: Reptilia
- Order: Squamata
- Suborder: Serpentes
- Family: Colubridae
- Genus: Synophis
- Species: S. plectovertebralis

Binomial name
- Synophis plectovertebralis Sheil & T. Grant, 2001

Species of snake

Synophis plectovertebralis, also known as the braided shadow snake, is a species of snake in the family, Colubridae. It is found in Colombia.
