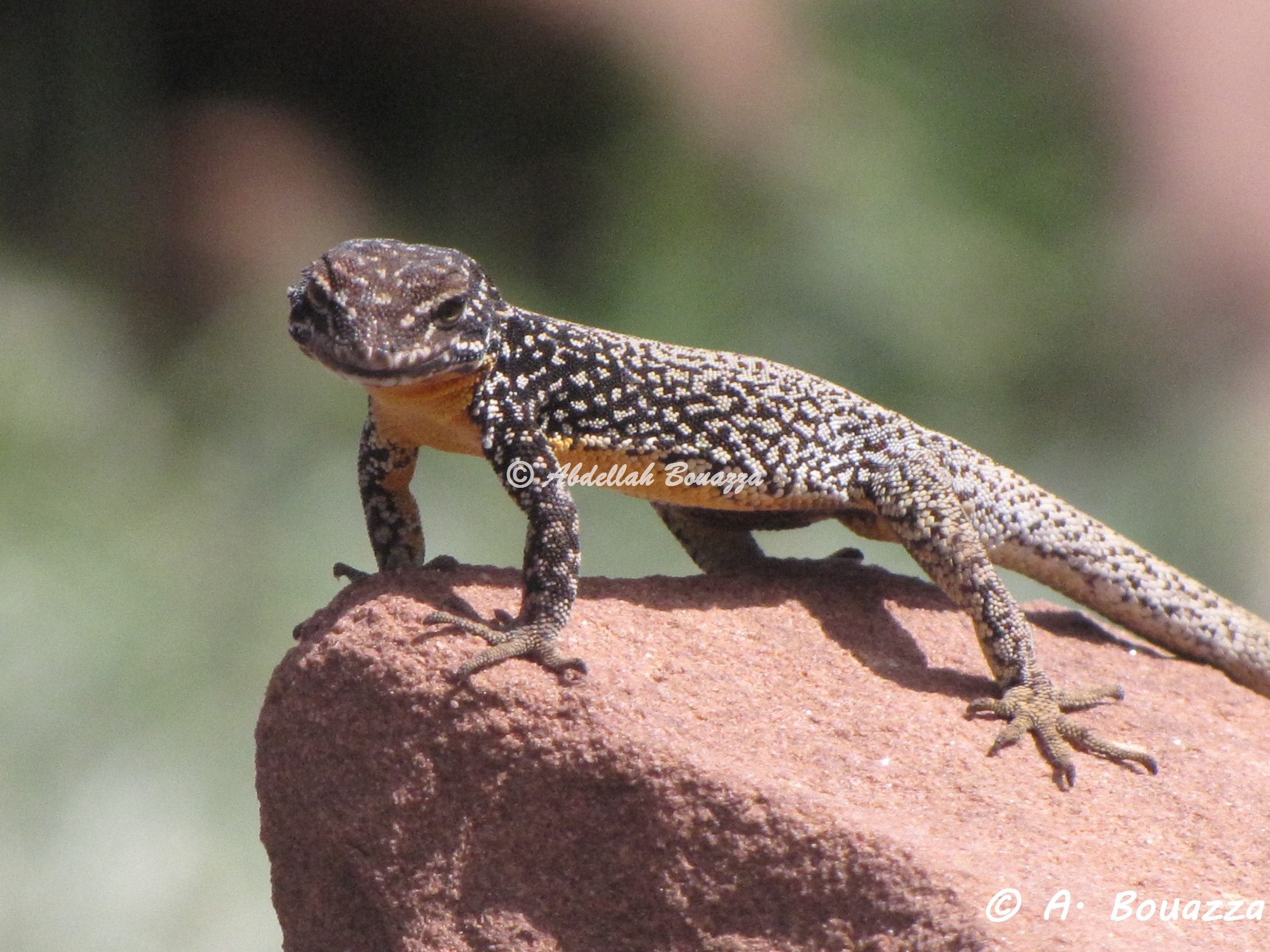
- Adult male

Conservation status
- Near Threatened (IUCN 3.1)

Scientific classification
- Kingdom: Animalia
- Phylum: Chordata
- Class: Reptilia
- Order: Squamata
- Suborder: Gekkota
- Family: Sphaerodactylidae
- Genus: Quedenfeldtia
- Species: Q. trachyblepharus

Binomial name
- Quedenfeldtia trachyblepharus (Boettger, 1873)

Synonyms
- Gymnodactylus trachyblepharus Boettger, 1873; Quedenfeldtia trachyblepharus — Loveridge, 1947

= Atlas day gecko =

Species of lizard

The Atlas day gecko (Quedenfeldtia trachyblepharus) is a species of lizard in the family Sphaerodactylidae. The species is endemic to Morocco.

== Taxonomy ==
This species shares the common name of Atlas day gecko with another species, Quedenfeldtia moerens.

== Biology ==
Q. trachyblepharus is diurnal, and is adapted to cold climates. Its natural habitat is rocky areas. Q. trachyblepharus is the dominant species in the alpine lizard assemblage above 2,500 m (8,200 ft). It is an oviparous species.
