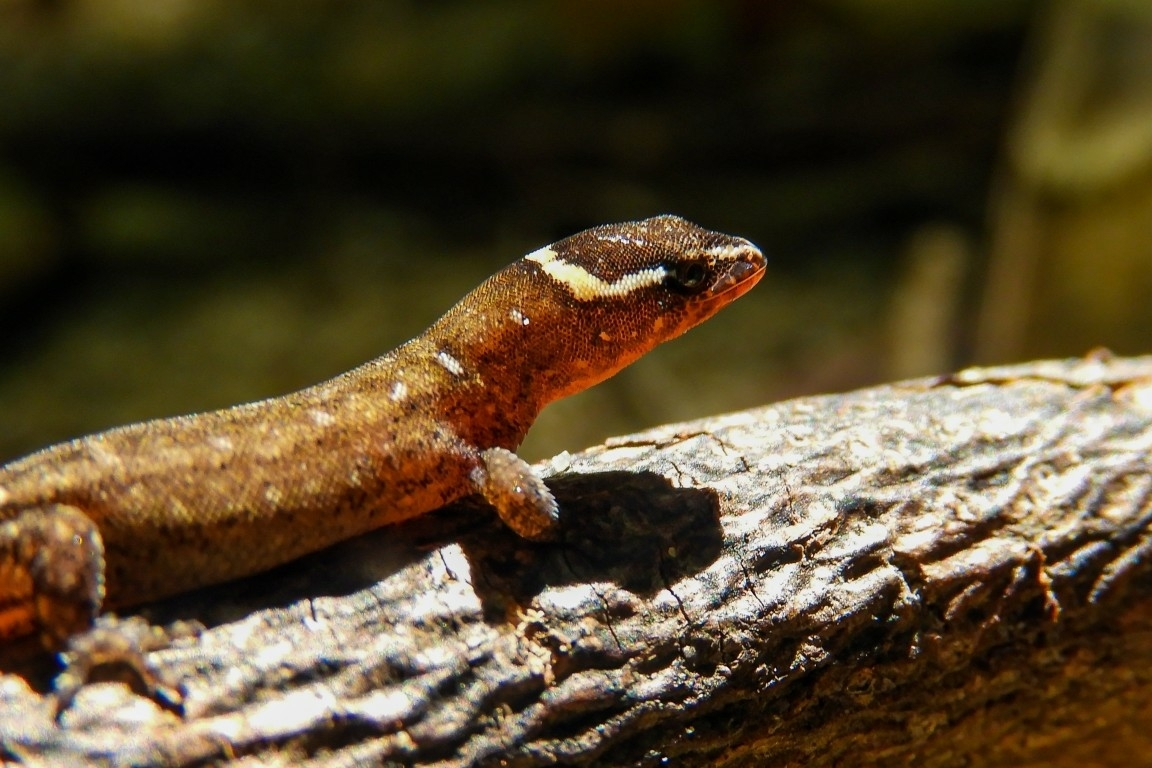
- Lepidoblepharis miyatai

Scientific classification
- Kingdom: Animalia
- Phylum: Chordata
- Class: Reptilia
- Order: Squamata
- Suborder: Gekkota
- Family: Sphaerodactylidae
- Genus: Lepidoblepharis; Peracca, 1897

Diversity
- 21 species (see text)

= Lepidoblepharis =

Genus of lizards

Lepidoblepharis is a genus of dwarf geckos, commonly known as scaly-eyed geckos, in the family Sphaerodactylidae. Species of the genus Lepidoblepharis are native to Central America and South America.

== Species ==
Genus Lepidoblepharis contains the following species:

- Lepidoblepharis buchwaldi F. Werner, 1910
- Lepidoblepharis colombianus Mechler, 1968
- Lepidoblepharis conolepis Ávila-Pires, 2001
- Lepidoblepharis duolepis Ayala & Castro, 1983
- Lepidoblepharis emberawoundule Batista, Ponce, Vesely, Mebert, Hertz, G. Köhler, Carrizo & Lotzkat, 2015
- Lepidoblepharis festae Peracca, 1897 – brown dwarf gecko
- Lepidoblepharis grandis Miyata, 1985
- Lepidoblepharis heyerorum Vanzolini, 1978
- Lepidoblepharis hoogmoedi Ávila-Pires, 1995 – Hoogmoed's scaly-eyed gecko, spotted dwarf gecko
- Lepidoblepharis intermedius Boulenger, 1914
- Lepidoblepharis microlepis (Noble, 1923)
- Lepidoblepharis miyatai Lamar, 1985
- Lepidoblepharis montecanoensis Markezich & Taphorn, 1994 – Paraguanan ground gekko
- Lepidoblepharis nukak Calderón-Espinosa & Medina-Rangel, 2016
- Lepidoblepharis peraccae Boulenger, 1908
- Lepidoblepharis rufigularis Batista, Ponce, Vesely, Mebert, Hertz, G. Köhler, Carrizo & Lotzkat, 2015
- Lepidoblepharis ruthveni Parker, 1926
- Lepidoblepharis sanctaemartae Ruthven, 1916
- Lepidoblepharis victormartinezi Batista, Ponce, Vesely, Mebert, Hertz, G. Köhler, Carrizo & Lotzkat, 2015
- Lepidoblepharis williamsi Ayala & Serna, 1986
- Lepidoblepharis xanthostigma (Noble, 1916)
