= Centroctenus =

Scientific classification
- Kingdom: Animalia
- Phylum: Arthropoda
- Subphylum: Chelicerata
- Class: Arachnida
- Order: Araneae
- Infraorder: Araneomorphae
- Family: Ctenidae
- Genus: Centroctenus; Mello-Leitão, 1929

Type species
- C. ocelliventer (Strand, 1909)

Species
- See text.

Genus of spiders

Centroctenus is a genus of South American wandering spiders (family Ctenidae) first described by Cândido Firmino de Mello-Leitão in 1929.

== Species ==
As of September 2025, the World Spider Catalog accepted 13 species:

- Centroctenus acara Brescovit, 1996 – Brazil
- Centroctenus alinahui Brescovit, Torres, Rego & Polotow, 2020 – Ecuador
- Centroctenus auberti (Caporiacco, 1954) – Venezuela, Brazil, French Guiana
- Centroctenus brevipes (Keyserling, 1891) – South America
- Centroctenus chalkidisi Brescovit, Torres, Rego & Polotow, 2020 – Brazil
- Centroctenus claudia Brescovit, Torres, Rego & Polotow, 2020 – Brazil
- Centroctenus coloso Brescovit, Torres, Rego & Polotow, 2020 – Colombia
- Centroctenus danielae (Brescovit, Cizauskas & Polotow, 2022) – Brazil
- Centroctenus dourados Brescovit, Torres, Rego & Polotow, 2020 – Brazil
- Centroctenus irupana Brescovit, 1996 – Bolivia
- Centroctenus miriuma Brescovit, 1996 – Brazil
- Centroctenus ocelliventer (Strand, 1909) (type) – Colombia, Brazil
- Centroctenus varzea Brescovit, Torres, Rego & Polotow, 2020 – Brazil
