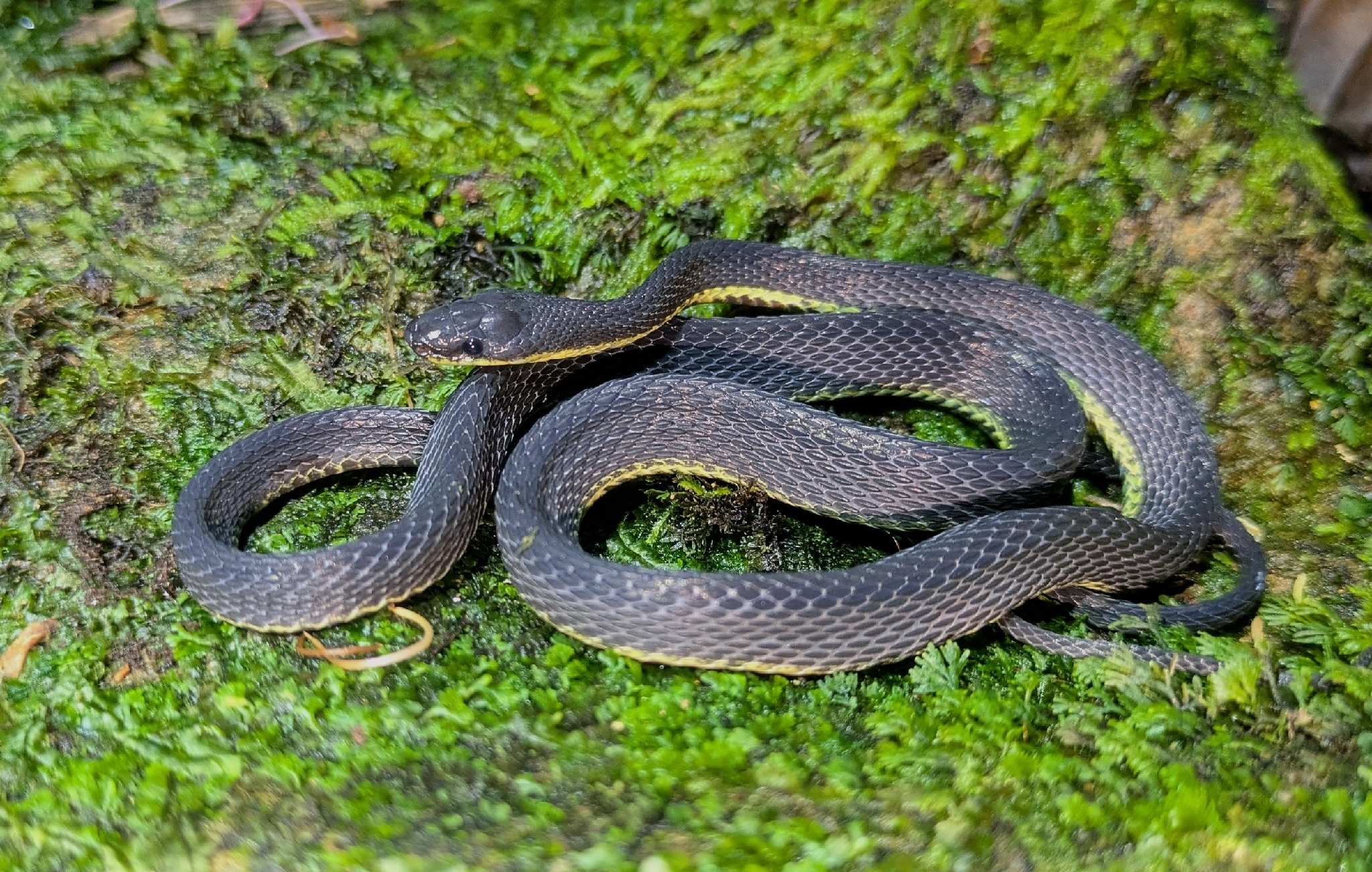

Conservation status
- Data Deficient (IUCN 3.1)

Scientific classification
- Kingdom: Animalia
- Phylum: Chordata
- Class: Reptilia
- Order: Squamata
- Suborder: Serpentes
- Family: Colubridae
- Genus: Synophis
- Species: S. lasallei

Binomial name
- Synophis lasallei (Nicéforo-María, 1950)

Synonyms
- Diaphorolepis lasallei Nicéforo-María, 1950

= Synophis lasallei =

Species of snake

Synophis lasallei, also known commonly as Lasalle's fishing snake, La Salle's shadow snake, and la culebra andinas de la sombra de La Salle in South American Spanish, is a species of snake in the subfamily Dipsadinae of the family Colubridae. The species is native to northwestern South America.

== Etymology ==
The specific name, lasallei, refers to the Instituto de La Salle, Bogotá, Colombia.

== Geographic range ==
S. lasallei is found in Colombia and Ecuador.

== Habitat ==
The preferred natural habitat of S. lasallei is forest.

== Diet ==
S. lasallei preys upon frogs and small lizards.
