= Geiseleptes =

Geiseleptes Temporal range: Eocene ~47 Ma

Scientific classification
- Domain: Eukaryota
- Kingdom: Animalia
- Phylum: Chordata
- Class: Reptilia
- Order: Squamata
- Infraorder: Gekkota
- Family: Sphaerodactylidae
- Genus: †Geiseleptes; Villa, Wings & Rabi, 2022
- Species: †G. delfinoi

Binomial name
- †Geiseleptes delfinoi Villa, Wings & Rabi, 2022

Extinct genus of geckos

Geiseleptes is a genus of extinct sphaerodactylid geckos that lived in the Eocene (Middle Paleogene, 47 Ma) of Germany. The genus is made up of one species, Geiseleptes delfinoi. The genus is named after the site of discovery, the Geiseltal coal mine, while the specific name honors paleoherpetologist Massimo Delfino.

The species is based on a single fossil, an incomplete skull designated GMH Ce IV-4057-1933, which is split into two parts (dubbed parts a and b). This skull was discovered in 1933 and described in 2022 by a research team led by Dr. Andrea Villa (ICP-UAB), Dr. Oliver Wings (MLU), and Dr. Marton Rabi (MLU). It is the oldest and most complete gecko skull found. G. delfinoi is a close relative to the European leaf-toed gecko (Euleptes europaea) and represents the oldest known representative of its lineage.

47 million years ago, central Germany would have been subtropical forests. Geiseleptes implies that European sphaerodactylids (the newly named subfamily Euleptinae) have persisted as a long-lasting and stable lineage.
