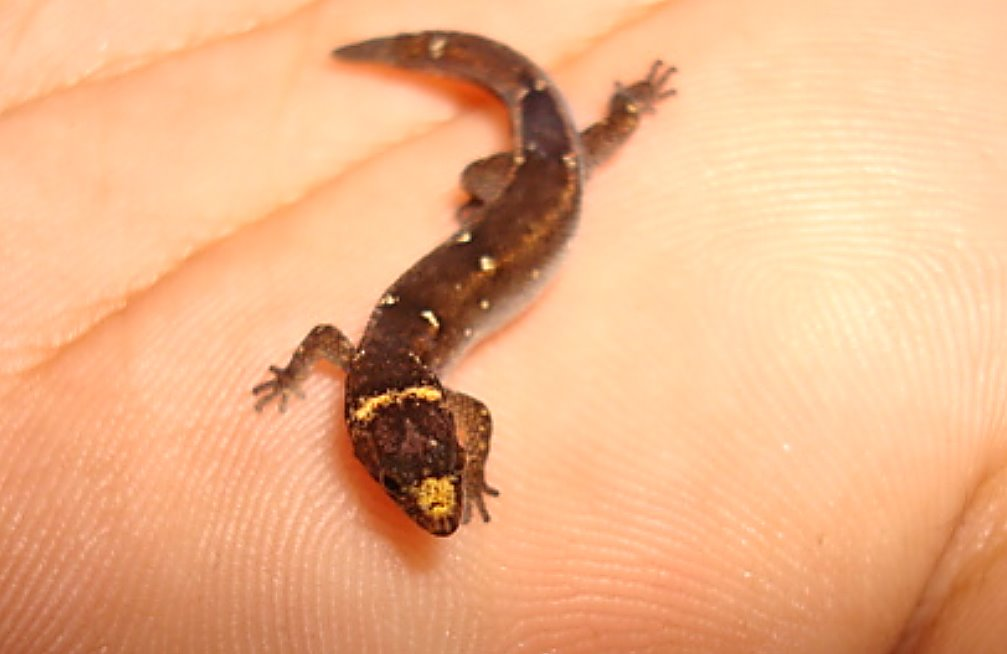
- Coleodactylus natalensis

Scientific classification
- Domain: Eukaryota
- Kingdom: Animalia
- Phylum: Chordata
- Class: Reptilia
- Order: Squamata
- Infraorder: Gekkota
- Family: Sphaerodactylidae
- Genus: Coleodactylus; Parker, 1926

= Coleodactylus =

Genus of lizards

Coleodactylus is a genus of South American geckos.

== Classification ==
Coleodactylus is placed in the family Sphaerodactylidae and contains the following species which are recognized as being valid.

- Coleodactylus brachystoma (Amaral, 1935) – Goias gecko
- Coleodactylus elizae Gonçalves, Torquato, Skuk & Araújo Sena, 2012
- Coleodactylus meridionalis (Boulenger, 1888) – meridian gecko
- Coleodactylus natalensis Freire, 1999 – Natal pygmy gecko
- Coleodactylus septentrionalis Vanzolini, 1980 – Ilha Maracá gecko

The species formerly known as Coleodactylus amazonicus has been transferred to the genus Chatogekko.
