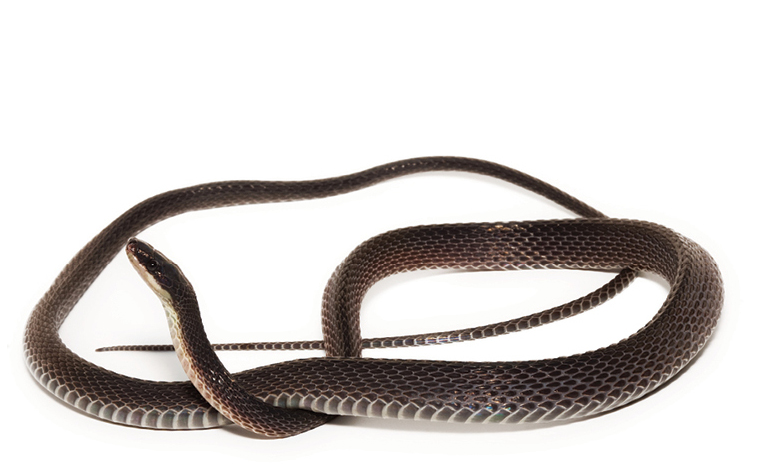

Scientific classification
- Kingdom: Animalia
- Phylum: Chordata
- Class: Reptilia
- Order: Squamata
- Suborder: Serpentes
- Family: Colubridae
- Genus: Synophis
- Species: S. zamora

Binomial name
- Synophis zamora Torres-Carvajal, Echevarría, Venegas, Chávez & Camper, 2015

= Synophis zamora =

Species of snake

Synophis zamora, also known as the Zamoran shadow snake, is a species of snake in the family, Colubridae. It is found in Ecuador.
