= Synophis niceforomariae =

Scientific classification
- Kingdom: Animalia
- Phylum: Chordata
- Class: Reptilia
- Order: Squamata
- Suborder: Serpentes
- Family: Colubridae
- Genus: Synophis
- Species: S. niceforomariae

Binomial name
- Synophis niceforomariae Pyron, Arteaga, Echevarría, & Torres-Carvajal, 2016

Species of snake

Synophis niceforomariae, also known as Nicéforo María's shadow snake, is a species of snake in the family, Colubridae. It is found in Colombia.
