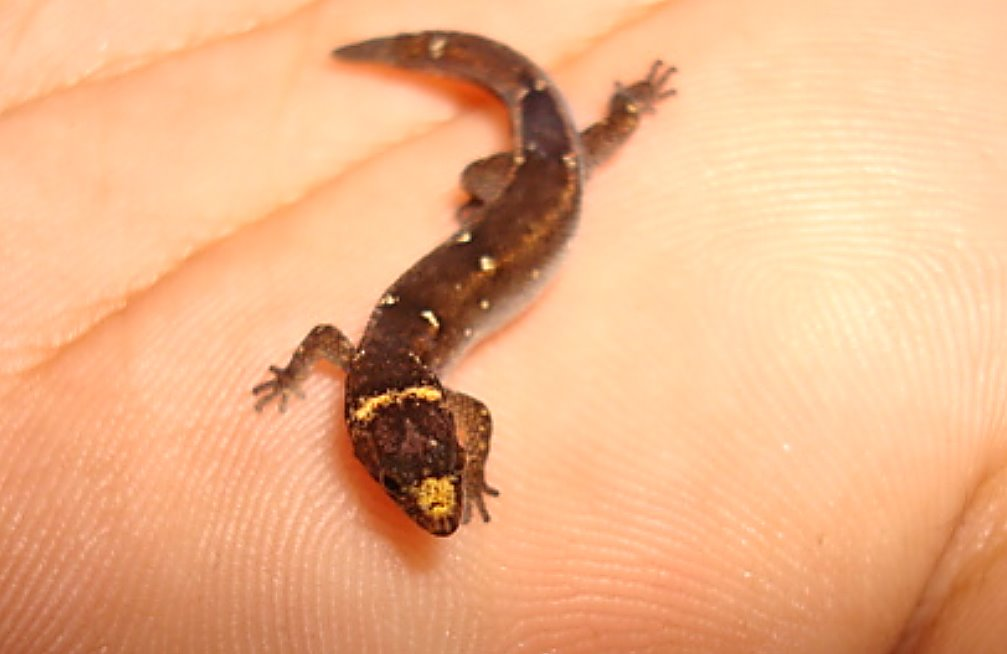
- Coleodactylus natalensis

Conservation status
- Endangered (IUCN 3.1)

Scientific classification
- Kingdom: Animalia
- Phylum: Chordata
- Class: Reptilia
- Order: Squamata
- Suborder: Gekkota
- Family: Sphaerodactylidae
- Genus: Coleodactylus
- Species: C. natalensis

Binomial name
- Coleodactylus natalensis Freire, 1999

= Natal pygmy gecko =

Species of lizard

The Natal pygmy gecko (Coleodactylus natalensis) is a species of South American lizard in the family Sphaerodactylidae.

== Etymology ==
The specific epithet, natalensis, refers to Natal, Rio Grande do Norte, Brazil, the location of its first discovery.

== Geographic range ==
C. natalensis is endemic to the Atlantic Forest of Brazil.

== Description ==
With a total length (including tail) of 35 mm (1.4 in), C. natalensis is one of the smallest known lizards.

== Reproduction ==
C. natalensis is oviparous. Females probably have a clutch size just one egg. Size at hatching is 11 mm (0.4 in) in snout–vent length; the tail adds to this only one millimeter.
