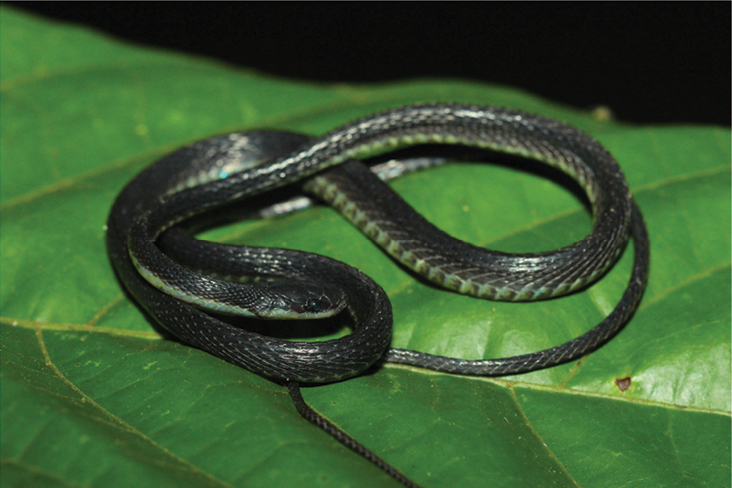

Scientific classification
- Kingdom: Animalia
- Phylum: Chordata
- Class: Reptilia
- Order: Squamata
- Suborder: Serpentes
- Family: Colubridae
- Genus: Synophis
- Species: S. insulomontanus

Binomial name
- Synophis insulomontanus Torres-Carvajal, Echevarría, Venegas, Chávez & Camper, 2015

= Synophis insulomontanus =

Species of snake

Synophis insulomontanus, known commonly as the mountain shadow snake, is a species of snake in the family Colubridae. The species is endemic to northwestern South America.

== Geographic range ==
S. insulomontanus is found in Huánuco Region, Peru.

== Habitat ==
The preferred habitat of S. insulomontanus is forests on the Amazonian slopes of the Andes in northern and central Peru at elevations of approximately 1,100–1,800 m (3,600–5,900 ft).

== Behavior ==
A nocturnal, terrestrial, and semiarboreal species, S. insulomontanus has been found foraging on the forest floor in leaf litter, and coiled in bromeliads 1 m (3.3 ft) above the ground.

== Diet ==
The diet of S. insulomontanus is unknown. Despite the allusion to fishing in one of its common names, there is no evidence that the species eats fish.
