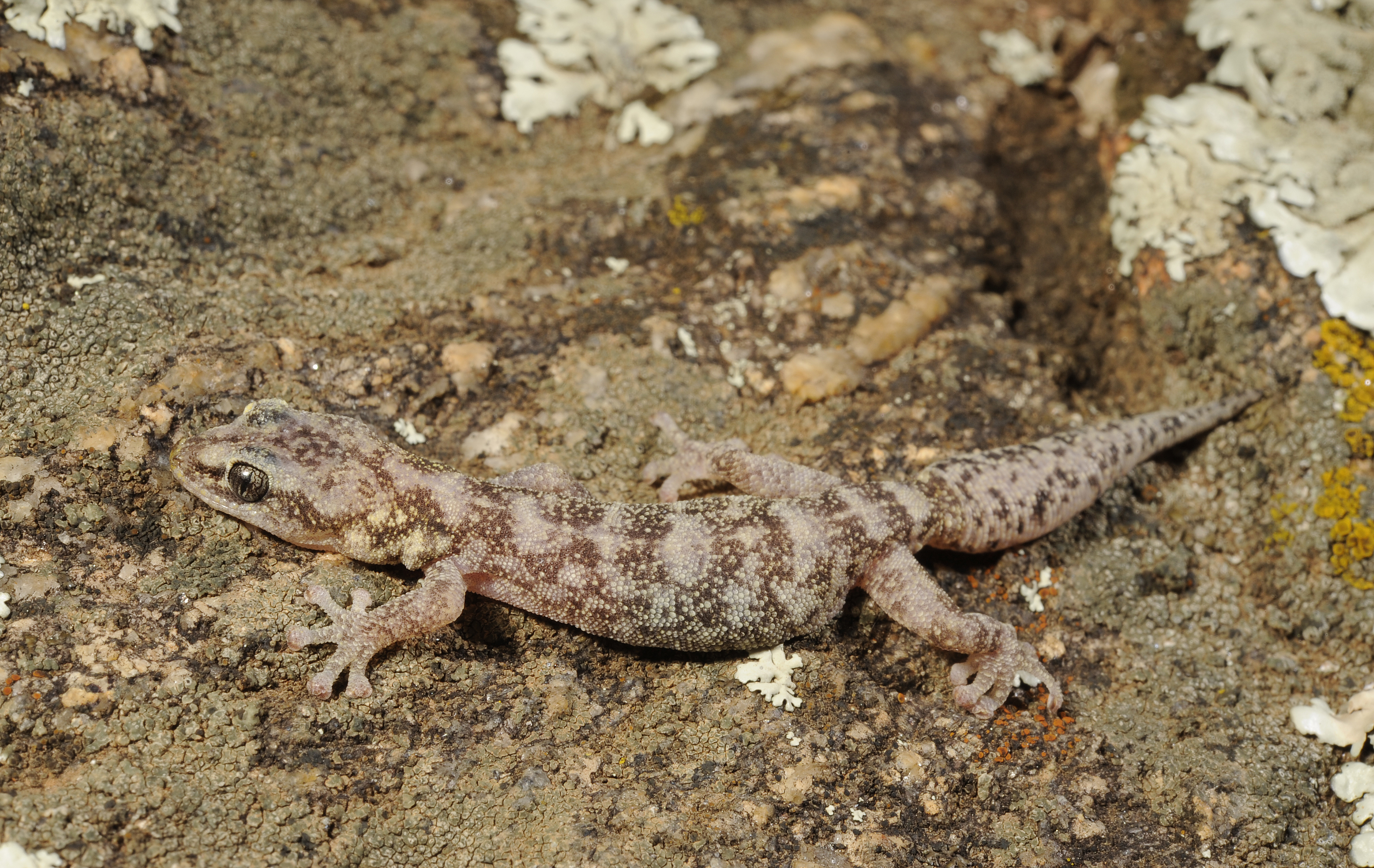

Conservation status
- Least Concern (IUCN 3.1)

Scientific classification
- Kingdom: Animalia
- Phylum: Chordata
- Class: Reptilia
- Order: Squamata
- Suborder: Gekkota
- Family: Sphaerodactylidae
- Genus: Euleptes
- Species: E. europaea

Binomial name
- Euleptes europaea (Gené, 1839)

Synonyms
- Phyllodactylus europaeus Gené, 1839

= European leaf-toed gecko =

Species of lizard

The European leaf-toed gecko (Euleptes europaea) is a species of lizard in the family Sphaerodactylidae. It is found in coastal regions of France, Italy and Tunisia and on Mediterranean islands. Its natural habitats are rocky areas and rocky shores.

== Description ==
The European leaf-toed gecko can grow to a length of about 8 cm (3 in) but 6 centimetres (2.4 in) is a more usual size. The head is diamond-shaped, wide and somewhat flattened, and the pupils of the large eyes are vertical slits. The body is quite plump and the limbs are short in relation to the length of the body. There are adhesive pads on the tips of its squarish toes and on the tip of its tail and it is a superb climber. The tail is as long as the body. When the tail has been lost and a new one has been regenerated, it can be twice as thick as the original one. The skin is slightly granular but lacks tubercles, a fact which distinguishes the species from other European geckos. The colour is quite variable, ranging from yellowish brown to greyish brown, patterned and blotched with yellow, often in transverse streaks. Like other geckos, the European leaf-toed gecko can change colour and tends to be a paler colour when conditions are hot and a darker colour when conditions are cooler.

== Distribution and habitat ==
This gecko is found on Corsica and Sardinia and various other Mediterranean islands including some off Tunisia, as well as in a few locations in southern France near the coast and similar locations in Tuscany in central Italy. Its mainly island distribution may indicate a relatively recent contraction of its range. It is inconspicuous and mainly nocturnal and is found on rocks, walls, boulders and crags, especially on granite. It is not often found in occupied buildings but may be found on ruins or occasionally on the trunks of trees. It is usually found at low levels but in warmer conditions may be found up to an altitude of about 1,500 metres (4,900 ft). In the daytime it often hides behind rock flakes and in cracks and has been found at densities of up to 200 animals per square metre.

== Reproduction ==
The species hibernates in the winter and emerges when the weather warms up in the spring. The mating rituals can be quite boisterous and include the biting of the partner's tail which may be shed as a result. A clutch of usually two eggs are laid, stuck to the rock inside a crack. They take from eight to thirteen weeks to hatch and the juveniles are about 3 centimetres (1.2 in) long soon after they emerge. They become mature at two to three years old and may live for twenty.

== Behaviour ==
E. europaea is very agile and can jump considerable distances. It feeds on insects and other small invertebrates and often stalks its prey, approaching very slowly before making a final leap. In the daytime it may bask in the sun on rocks where it is well camouflaged. It is preyed on by birds and snakes.

The species' 'leaf-padded' feet are better able to grip substrate in the presence of dust than those of 'basally padded' geckos. On the small island of Giraglia, invasive Tarentola mauritanica have become established on a concrete structure, but are unable to inhabit the rest of the island, where E. europaea is native, due to the dusty conditions. The latter's toe-tip pads can be lifted aside to allow use of claws to climb when the pads are fouled with dust, something not possible with the full toe pads of T. mauritanica.

== See also ==
- List of reptiles of Italy
