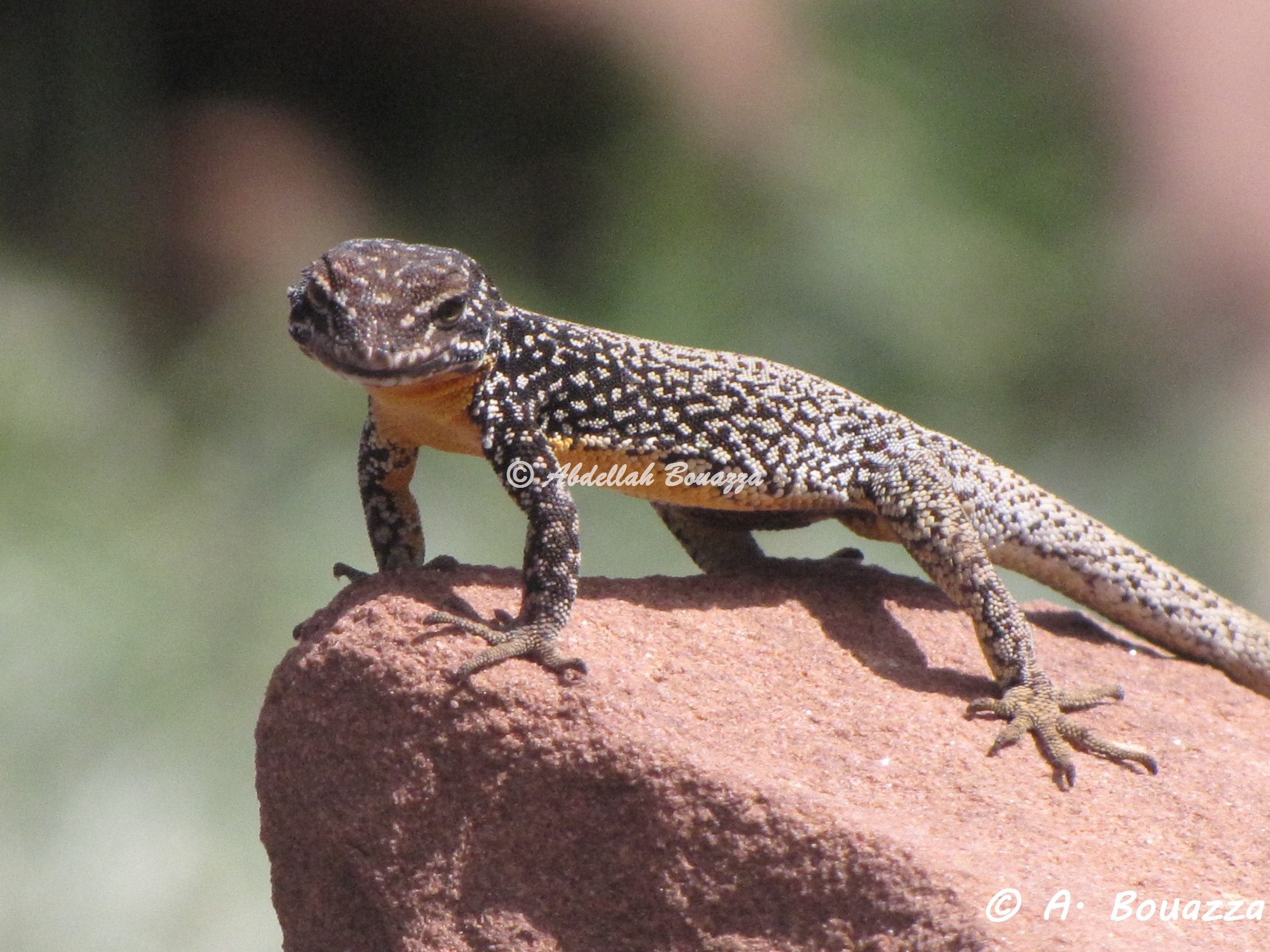
- Atlas day gecko (Quedenfeldtia trachyblepharus)

Scientific classification
- Kingdom: Animalia
- Phylum: Chordata
- Class: Reptilia
- Order: Squamata
- Suborder: Gekkota
- Family: Sphaerodactylidae
- Genus: Quedenfeldtia; Boettger, 1883

= Quedenfeldtia =

Genus of lizards

Quedenfeldtia is a small genus containing two attractive lizard species, both commonly known as the Atlas day gecko, in the family Sphaerodactylidae. The genus is endemic to the Atlas Mountains of northwestern Africa. Despite their common name, they are not part of the day gecko genus (Phelsuma) and do not resemble them in any way.

== Etymology ==
The generic name, Quedenfeldtia, is in honor of German naturalist Max Quedenfeldt (1851–1891).

== Species ==
Two species are recognized as being valid.

- Quedenfeldtia moerens (Chabanaud, 1916) – Atlas day gecko
- Quedenfeldtia trachyblepharus (Boettger, 1873) – Atlas day gecko

Nota bene: A binomial authority in parentheses indicates that the species was originally described in a genus other than Quedenfeldtia.
