= Colombian clawed gecko =

Conservation status
- Data Deficient (IUCN 3.1)

Scientific classification
- Kingdom: Animalia
- Phylum: Chordata
- Class: Reptilia
- Order: Squamata
- Suborder: Gekkota
- Family: Sphaerodactylidae
- Genus: Pseudogonatodes
- Species: P. furvus

Binomial name
- Pseudogonatodes furvus Ruthven, 1915

Species of lizard

The Colombian clawed gecko (Pseudogonatodes furvus) is a species of lizard in the family Sphaerodactylidae. It is endemic to the Magdalena, Colombia.
