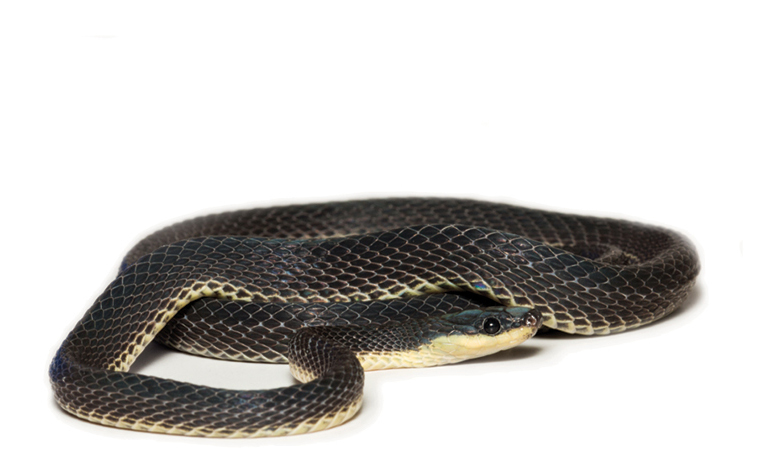

Scientific classification
- Kingdom: Animalia
- Phylum: Chordata
- Class: Reptilia
- Order: Squamata
- Suborder: Serpentes
- Family: Colubridae
- Genus: Synophis
- Species: S. bogerti

Binomial name
- Synophis bogerti Torres-Carvajal, Echevarría, Venegas, Chávez & Camper, 2015

= Synophis bogerti =

Species of snake

Synophis bogerti, known commonly as Bogert's fishing snake or Bogert's shadow snake, is a species of snake in the family Colubridae. The species is endemic to northwestern South America.

== Etymology ==
The specific name, bogerti, is in honor of American herpetologist Charles Mitchill Bogert.

== Geographic range ==
S. bogerti is found in Napo Province, Ecuador.
