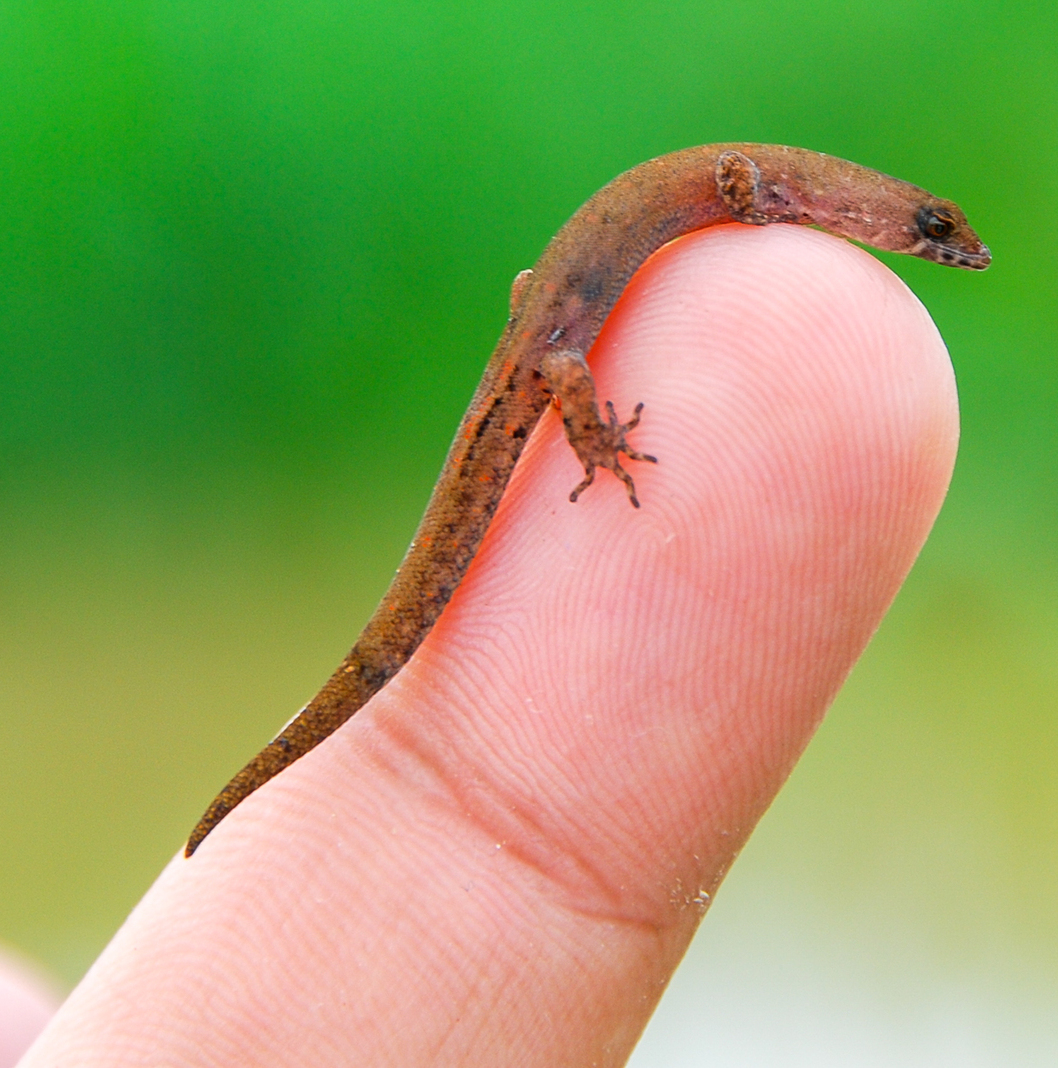
- Pseudogonatodes guianensis

Scientific classification
- Kingdom: Animalia
- Phylum: Chordata
- Class: Reptilia
- Order: Squamata
- Suborder: Gekkota
- Family: Sphaerodactylidae
- Genus: Pseudogonatodes; Ruthven, 1915

= Pseudogonatodes =

Genus of lizards

Pseudogonatodes is a genus of sphaerodactylid geckos, often known as South American clawed geckos, containing seven described species. Like most sphaerodactylines (South American sphaerodactylids), Pseudogonatodes are miniaturized geckos and among the smallest living lizards. They are diurnal and terrestrial, foraging among leaf litter and rotting wood on the ground. Prey items are primarily small arthropods such as springtails, insect larvae, and orthopterans (crickets and kin). Though locally common and not strongly threatened with extinction, most species occupy restricted ranges in remote tropical forests. The most widespread and well-studied species, Pseudogonatodes guianensis, is found throughout the Amazon rainforest.

== Species ==
The following species and subspecies are recognized as being valid.

- Pseudogonatodes barbouri (Noble, 1921) – Barbour's clawed gecko
- Pseudogonatodes furvus Ruthven, 1915 – Colombian clawed gecko
- Pseudogonatodes gasconi Ávila-Pires & Hoogmoed, 2000
- Pseudogonatodes guianensis Parker, 1935 – Amazon pigmy gecko
  - Pseudogonatodes guianensis amazonicus Vanzolini, 1967 – Amazonas Guyana clawed gecko
  - Pseudogonatodes guianensis guianensis Parker, 1935
- Pseudogonatodes lunulatus (Roux, 1927) – Venezuela clawed gecko
- Pseudogonatodes manessi Ávila-Pires & Hoogmoed, 2000
- Pseudogonatodes peruvianus Huey & Dixon, 1970 – Peru clawed gecko

Nota bene: A binomial authority in parentheses indicates that the species was originally described in a genus other than Pseudogonatodes.
