= Centroctenus brevipes =

Scientific classification
- Kingdom: Animalia
- Phylum: Arthropoda
- Subphylum: Chelicerata
- Class: Arachnida
- Order: Araneae
- Infraorder: Araneomorphae
- Family: Ctenidae
- Genus: Centroctenus
- Species: C. brevipes

Binomial name
- Centroctenus brevipes (Keyserling, 1891)

Synonyms
- Ctenus albovittatus Mello-Leitão, 1939; Ctenus anisitsi Strand, 1909; Ctenus atrivulva Strand, 1909; Ctenus binotatus Mello-Leitão, 1936; Ctenus birabeni Mello-Leitão, 1941; Ctenus brevilabris Strand, 1909; Ctenus brevipes Keyserling, 1891; Ctenus gynheraldicus Mello-Leitão, 1936; Ctenus mentor Strand, 1909; Ctenus taeniatus Keyserling, 1891; Ctenus tatarendensis Tullgren, 1905; Ctenus thomasi F. O. Pickard-Cambridge, 1902; Isoctenus masculus Mello-Leitão, 1939; Parabatinga brevipes Polotow & Brescovit, 2009

Genus of spiders

Centroctenus brevipes is a species of South American wandering spiders (family Ctenidae). In 2009, it was placed in the monotypic genus Parabatinga as Parabatinga brevipes, but as of September 2025 is accepted in the genus Centroctenus. The species is found in Colombia, Brazil, Bolivia, Paraguay, Argentina, and Uruguay.
