= Giuseppe Gené =

Italian scientist

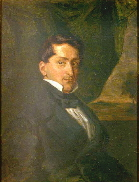
Giuseppe Gené.

Carlo Giuseppe Gené (7 December 1800 – 14 July 1847) was an Italian naturalist and author.

Gené was born at Turbigo in Lombardy and studied at the University of Pavia. He published a number of papers on natural history, particularly entomology. In 1828 he became an assistant lecturer in natural history at the university, and in the following year he traveled to Hungary, returning with a collection of insect specimens. Between 1833 and 1838 he made four trips to Sardinia collecting insects.

In 1830 Gené succeeded Franco Andrea Bonelli as professor of zoology and director of the Royal Zoological Museum at Turin. Most of his insect collection is in the Turin Museum of Natural History. Duplicates are in Museo Civico di Storia Naturale di Milano and in Museo di storia naturale dell'Università di Pisa.

The slender-billed gull (Larus genei) was named after him.

== Works ==
- A work on apiculture (1835)
- De quibusdam insectis Sardiniae novis aut minus cognitis. (1839)
- Dei pregiudizi popolari intorno agli animali (1869)
