= Mario Giacinto Peracca =

Italian herpetologist (1861–1923)

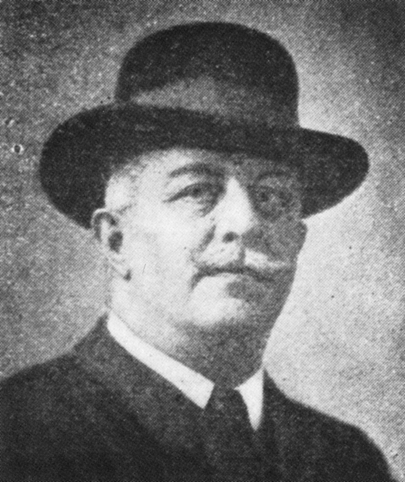
Mario Giacinto Peracca (1861–1923)

Mario Giacinto Peracca (21 November 1861, Turin – 23 May 1923, Turin) was an Italian herpetologist.

He discovered zoology through his father, an amateur ornithologist. He started taking medical classes at the University of Turin, with his studies eventually turning to zoology. In 1886, he obtained his degree from the university under the direction of Michele Lessona (1823–1894). After graduation, he remained in Turin as an assistant to Lessona, and later Lorenzo Camerano (1856–1917), at the zoological institute. Here he worked until his retirement in 1920.

At the zoological institute, he served as curator of herpetological collections. Among the specimens at the museum were reptiles and amphibians that were produced at his estate, where he kept a large temperature-controlled vivarium with tropical plants, containing animals that included giant salamanders and Galapagos tortoises.

Many of his written works dealt with herpetological collections from South America and Africa (including Madagascar), with some publications on specimens from Italy, the Middle East, China and Australia. He was the taxonomic authority of numerous reptile and amphibian species, and has several species named after him, such as Peracca's clawed frog (Xenopus clivii), Mantidactylus peraccae, Anolis peraccae, and Lepidoblepharis peraccae, the latter three species being described by his friend, George Albert Boulenger (1858–1937).

== Publications ==
- Descrizione di nuove specie di Rettili e Anfibi di Madagascar, 1892. (in Italian).
- Viaggio del Dr. Enrico Festa nella Repubblica dell'Ecuador e regioni vicine. VI. Rettili, 1897. (in Italian).
- Viaggio del Dr. Enrico Festa nell'Ecuador e regioni vicine. Rettili ed Anfibi, 1904. (in Italian).

== Bibliography ==
- "The Life and Herpetological Contributions of Mario Giacinto Peracca (1861–1923)", Society for the Study of Amphibians and Reptiles, 2007, 570 pp.

== See also ==
- Raymond Rollinat
