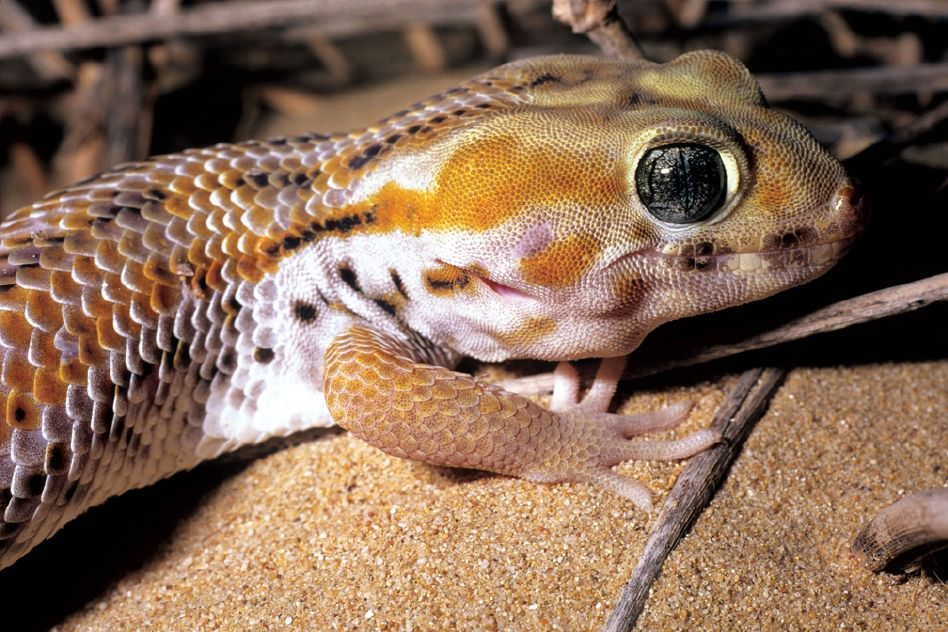
- Persian wonder gecko (Teratoscincus keyserlingii )

Scientific classification
- Kingdom: Animalia
- Phylum: Chordata
- Class: Reptilia
- Order: Squamata
- Suborder: Gekkota
- Superfamily: Gekkonoidea
- Family: Sphaerodactylidae; Underwood, 1954

Genera
- 12, see text.

= Sphaerodactylidae =

Sphaerodactylidae Temporal range: Eocene - Present ~47–0 Ma

Family of geckos

The Sphaerodactylidae are a family of geckos (Gekkota) distributed in North America, Central America, South America, and the Caribbean, as well as in Southern Europe, North Africa, the Middle East, and into Central Asia. The family contains 12 living genera and over 200 living species. The family name comes from the ball shape of their finger joints.

== Genera ==
The following genera are recognized as valid:

List of genera
| Genus | Image | Type species | Taxon author | Common name | Species |
| Aristelliger | A. georgeensis | A. lar Cope, 1862 | Cope, 1862 | Croaking geckos and Caribbean geckos | 9 |
| Chatogekko | C. amazonicus | C. amazonicus (Andersson, 1918) | Gamble, Daza, Colli, Vitt & Bauer, 2011 | Brazilian pygmy gecko | 1 |
| Coleodactylus | C. natalensis | C. meridionalis (Boulenger, 1888) | Parker, 1926 | | 5 |
| Euleptes | E. europaea | E. europaea (Gené, 1839) | Fitzinger, 1843 | European leaf-toed gecko | 1 |
| †Geiseleptes | | †G.delfinoi Villa, Wings & Rabi, 2022 | Villa, Wings & Rabi, 2022 | | 1 |
| Gonatodes | G. ceciliae | G. albogularis (Duméril & Bibron, 1836) | Fitzinger, 1843 | Dwarf geckos | 34 |
| Lepidoblepharis | L. xanthostigma | L. festae Peracca, 1897 | Peracca, 1897 | Scaly-eyed geckos | 21 |
| Pristurus | P. rupestris | P. flavipunctatus Rüppell, 1835 | Rüppell, 1835 | Rock geckos | 26 |
| Pseudogonatodes | P. guianensis | P. furvus Ruthven, 1915 | Ruthven, 1915 | South American clawed geckos | 7 |
| Quedenfeldtia | Q. trachyblepharus | Q. trachyblepharus (Boettger, 1873) | Boettger, 1883 | Atlas day geckos | 2 |
| Saurodactylus | S. brosseti | S. mauritanicus (Duméril & Bibron, 1836) | Fitzinger, 1843 | Lizard-fingered geckos | 7 |
| Sphaerodactylus | S. fantasticus | S. sputator (Sparrman, 1784) | Wagler, 1830 | Sphaeros and least geckos | 108 |
| Teratoscincus | T. bedriagai | T. keyserlingii Strauch, 1863 | Strauch, 1863 | Wonder geckos | 9 |
