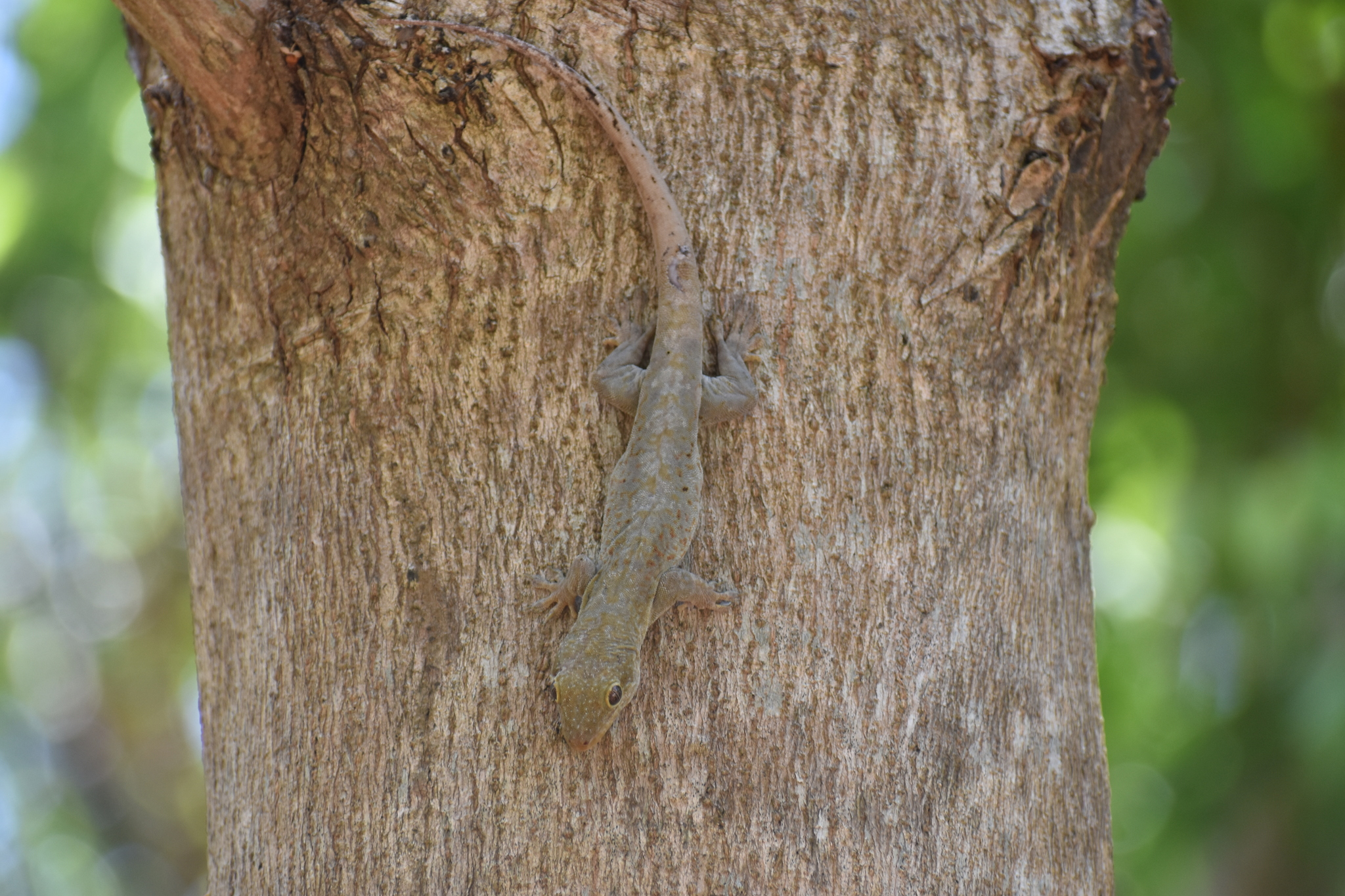
- Aristelliger georgeensis

Scientific classification
- Kingdom: Animalia
- Phylum: Chordata
- Class: Reptilia
- Order: Squamata
- Suborder: Gekkota
- Family: Sphaerodactylidae
- Genus: Aristelliger; Cope, 1862

Species
- 9, see text.

= Aristelliger =

Genus of geckos

Aristelliger is a genus of Caribbean geckos in the family Sphaerodactylidae, commonly known as croaking geckos or Caribbean geckos. The nine named species in the genus are native to various islands in the West Indies, though the species A. georgeensis is also found on mainland Belize. Aristelliger species are nocturnal and mostly arboreal, occupying palm tree trunks and other vertical surfaces. They are among the largest neotropical geckos, with A. lar reaching up to 135 mm (5.3 inches) in snout-vent-length (not including the tail). They are primarily insectivorous, feeding on a variety of arthropods. Cannibalism of eggs and hatchlings has been reported in A. cochranae. A. lar is omnivorous, and may be an important seed disperser for fruits of the plant Marcgravia. Many species of Aristelliger are accustomed to living among human structures, though several are threatened by urban and agricultural development or invasive species.

== Species ==
List of species
Image	Species	Taxon author	Common name(s)	Distribution	IUCN status
	A. barbouri	(Noble & Klingel, 1932)	Inagua croaking gecko, striped Caribbean gecko	Inagua (Bahamas)	Data Deficient
	A. cochranae	Grant, 1931	Cochran's Caribbean gecko, Navassa croaking gecko	Navassa Island	Least Concern
	A. expectatus	Cochran, 1933	Hispaniolan desert croaking gecko	Southwest Hispaniola and surrounding islands	Least Concern
	A. georgeensis	(Bocourt, 1873)	Saint George Island gecko	Coastal Belize and surrounding islands, southernmost Quintana Roo (Mexico), Swan Islands (Honduras), Providencia and San Andrés (Colombia)	Least Concern
	A. hechti	Schwartz & Crombie, 1975	Caicos croaking gecko	North Caicos, East Caicos, various nearby cays (Turks and Caicos Islands)	Vulnerable
	A. lar	Cope, 1862	Hispaniolan giant croaking gecko, spotted Caribbean gecko	Hispaniola and surrounding islands	Near Threatened
	A. nelsoni	(Barbour, 1914)	Swan Islands croaking gecko	Swan Islands (Honduras)	Endangered
	A. praesignis	(Hallowell, 1856)	Croaking lizard, woodslave, Jamaican croaking gecko	Jamaica and the Cayman Islands	Least Concern
	A. reyesi	Díaz & Hedges, 2009	Reyes' Caribbean gecko, Cuban croaking gecko	Península de Hicacos (Cuba)	Critically Endangered

Nota bene: A binomial authority in parentheses indicates that the species was originally described in a genus other than Aristelliger.
