= Asian tree frog =

Asian tree frog may refer to:

- Asian white-lipped tree frog (Polypedates leucomystax), a frog in the family Rhacophoridae native to Bangladesh, Brunei, Cambodia, China, India, Indonesia, Laos, Malaysia, Myanmar, Nepal, the Philippines, Singapore, Thailand, Vietnam, and possibly Bhutan
- Doria's Asian tree frog (Chiromantis doriae), a frog in the family Rhacophoridae found in southeastern Asia, from extreme northeastern India (Arunachal Pradesh) and adjacent Bangladesh to Myanmar, Thailand, Cambodia, Laos, Vietnam, and southern China (Yunnan, Guangdong, and Hainan)
- Nongkhor Asian tree frog (Chiromantis nongkhorensis), a frog in the family Rhacophoridae found in northeastern India (Assam), Myanmar, Thailand, Cambodia, Laos, Vietnam, and Malaysia
- Southeast Asian tree frog (Kurixalus appendiculatus), a frog in the family Rhacophoridae found in Brunei, Cambodia, India, Indonesia, Malaysia, Myanmar, the Philippines, Thailand, and Vietnam
