= Striped Caribbean gecko =

Conservation status
- Data Deficient (IUCN 3.1)

Scientific classification
- Kingdom: Animalia
- Phylum: Chordata
- Class: Reptilia
- Order: Squamata
- Suborder: Gekkota
- Family: Sphaerodactylidae
- Genus: Aristelliger
- Species: A. barbouri

Binomial name
- Aristelliger barbouri (Noble & Klingel, 1932)

Synonyms
- Aristelligella barbouri Noble & Klingel, 1932; Aristelliger cochranae barbouri — Hecht, 1951; Aristelliger barbouri — Schwartz, 1968

Species of lizard

The striped Caribbean gecko (Aristelliger barbouri), also known commonly as the Inagua croaking gecko and the Inagua gecko, is a species of lizard in the family Sphaerodactylidae. The species is endemic to the Bahamas.

== Etymology ==
The specific name, barbouri, is in honor of American herpetologist Thomas Barbour.

== Geographic Range ==
A. barbouri is found on Great Inagua Island including Sheep Cay, Inagua District, the Bahamas.

== Habitat ==
The preferred natural habitat of A. barbouri is shrubland.

== Description ==
A small species of lizard, A. barbouri may attain a snout-to-vent length (SVL) of 5 cm (2.0 in). Its tail is more darkly colored than its head and body.

== Reproduction ==
A. barbouri is oviparous.
