= Ambergris Cay =

Island in the Turks and Caicos Islands

Big Ambergris Cay
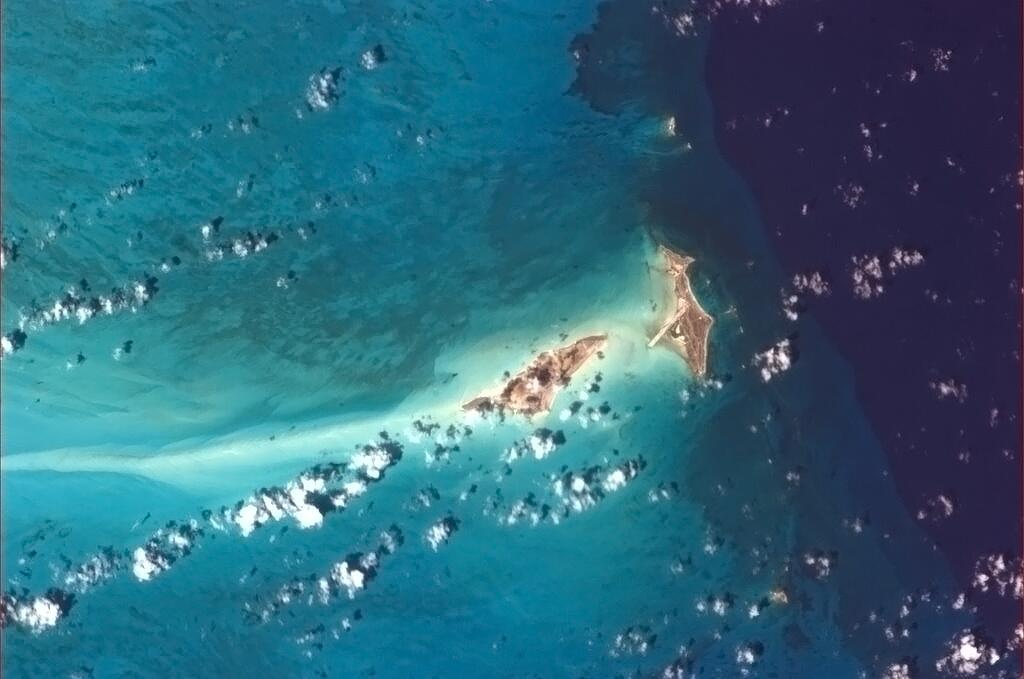
- Big and Little Ambergris Cay pictured from the International Space Station

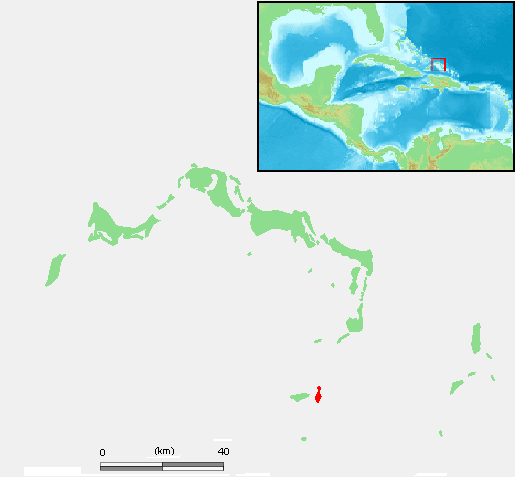
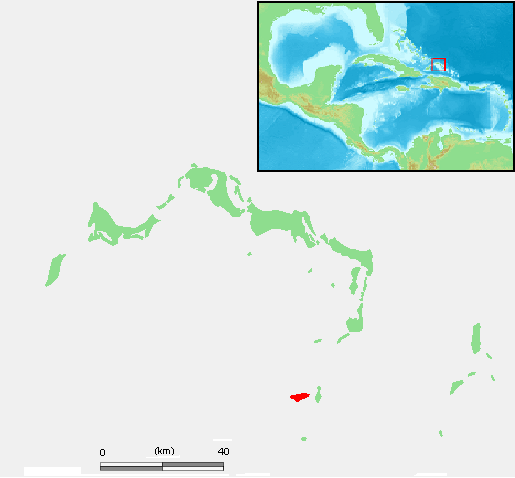
- Location of Big Ambergris Cay (top) and Little Ambergris Cay (bottom) within the Turks and Caicos Islands

- Location within Turks and Caicos Islands Location within the Caribbean

Geography
- Location: Atlantic Ocean
- Coordinates: 21°18′05.27″N 71°37′53.65″W
- Archipelago: Lucayan Archipelago

Administration
- United Kingdom; Turks and Caicos Islands
- British Overseas Territory: Turks and Caicos Islands

Additional information
- Time zone: EST (UTC-5)
  - Summer (DST): EDT (UTC-4)
- ISO code: TC

Big Ambergris Cay is a private residential island and, since 2019, home to Ambergris Cay Private Island Resort. It is located within the Turks and Caicos Islands and has been owned privately since 1811. Not to be confused with Ambergris Cay in the Bahamas, or Ambergris Caye in Belize, the island is situated to the southeast of the main chain of the Caicos islands. Big Ambergris Cay is approximately four miles (6.4 kilometres) long, one mile (1.6 kilometres) wide, and 1,100 acres (4.5 km^{2}) in total. Adjacent to Big Ambergris Cay is Little Ambergris Cay, which is an uninhabited natural reserve. Little Ambergris Cay is a unique and significant habitat for a wide range of birds and marine life.

The island was named for ambergris, a waxy substance that migrating sperm whales regurgitate and is prized as a fixative for perfume and cosmetic products. Ambergris used to wash up along the 8 miles (13 km) of island's shoreline but is rarely found on the island today.

Big Ambergris Cay is known for its shallow, turquoise waters. It is surrounded by sandbanks and coral reefs. To the east of the island, the water deepens as part of the Turks Island Passage.

== History ==
In the late 18th and early 19th centuries, Loyalists settled on Big Ambergris Cay, raised cows, made pottery, and built houses, stables, and cisterns. The ruins of these early colonial settlements can be seen today on the island.

John Lightbourne was the island's first owner, having purchased it from the Bahamas administration in 1811. Then, Horatio Stubbs of South Caicos purchased the island, the dwelling house, and a female slave in 1826 for the cost of 6,000 bushels of salt. Sisal was raised on the island toward the end of the 1800s.

In 1978 an investment group from the state of Arizona tried to purchase Ambergris Cay, with the goal of building a university on the island but this effort was rejected by the government. Canadian businessman Henry Mensen bought Big Ambergris Cay in 1995. Mensen started the development of the island to establish a luxury and exclusive residential community. Until at least 2022, Big and Little Ambergris Cay were managed by Turks and Caicos Collection. The island today has the Calico Restaurant and Bar (a reference to the famous 18th century pirate John Rackham), a clubhouse, and infrastructure for the island's self-sustenance. The latter includes the longest private runway in Caribbean capable of accommodating most private airplanes, reverse osmosis water purification, independent electrical generation systems, and a cell tower that provides phone and high-speed internet access.

== Transport ==
Ambergris Cay International Airport is located on the island. At 5,700 ft (1,700 m), it is the longest privately held airstrip in the Caribbean. The flight time from the main airport in Turks and Caicos Islands, Providenciales International Airport (PLS), to Big Ambergris Cay is approximately 18 minutes. The size of the airport allows the residents and guests to fly into the island with private airplanes. As the island is privately owned and managed collectively, prior permission to visit is required.

== Wildlife ==
=== Fauna ===
The reefs are home to dolphins, tarpons, bonefish, turtles, conch, and Caribbean lobster. Reports from local fishermen indicate that green and hawksbill sea turtles nest on the island.

The island is home to the native Turks and Caicos rock iguana (Cyclura carinata), which is critically endangered. The San Diego Zoo has an ongoing research study on the island's fauna. The island also provides habitat for the Silver Key anole (Anolis scriptus), the Caicos least gecko (Sphaerodactylus caicosensis), and the Turks and Caicos curly-tailed lizard (Leiocephalus psammodromus) The Caicos gecko (Aristelliger hechti) occurs on Little Ambergris Cay.

=== Flora ===
Endemic to the Turks and Caicos Islands, silverbush (Argythamnia argentea), island heather (Limonium bahamense) and orchid (Encyclia caicensis) are plant species found on Ambergris. Most importantly, the island is a significant habitat for Turk's Head Cacti (Melocactus), the cactus species from which the name of Turks and Caicos Islands derives. The cactus is known for its similarity to the Turkish hat, Fez, and is therefore, called the 'Turk's Head or Cap'.
