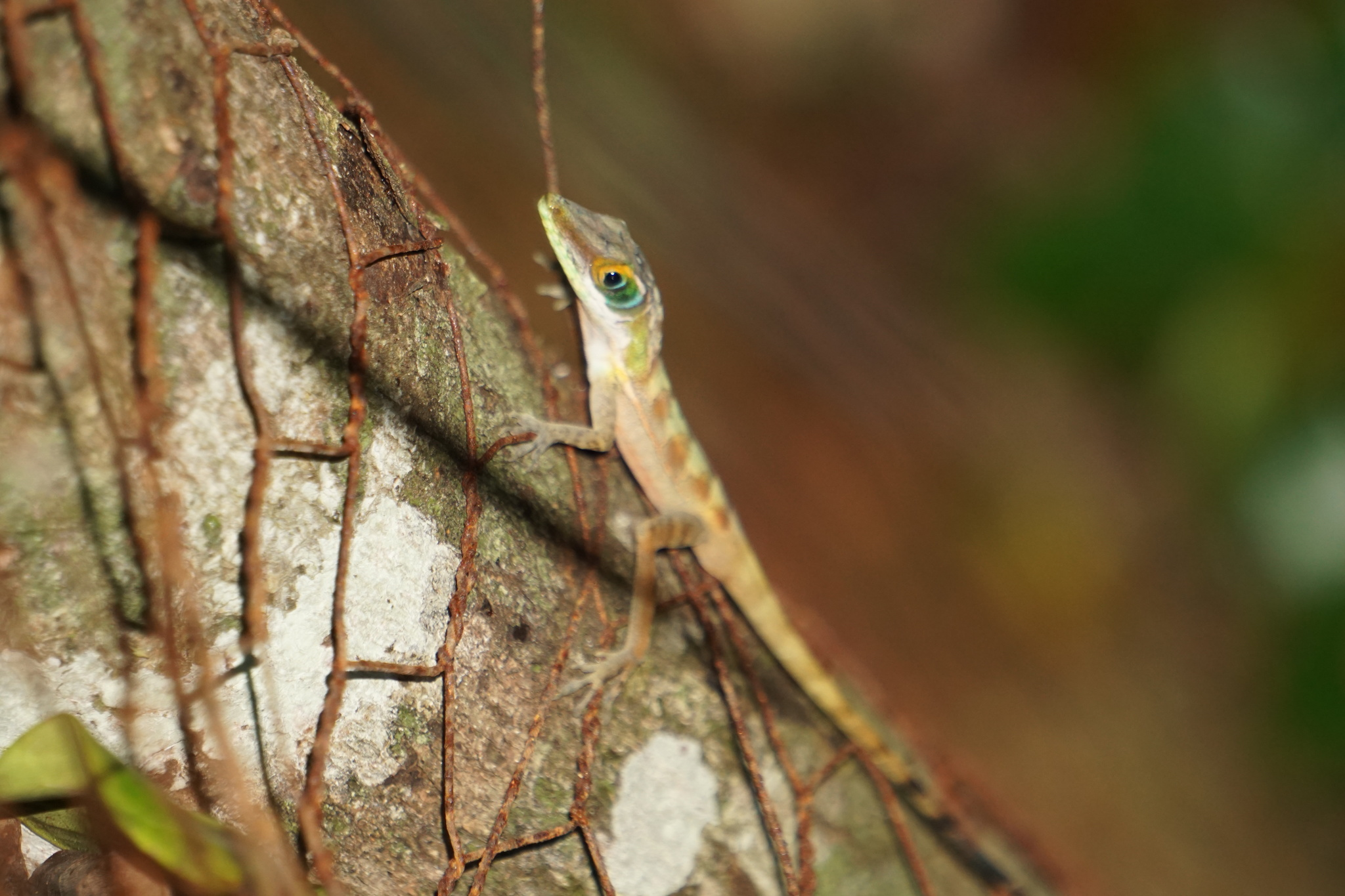
- Juvenile A. bahorucoensis

Conservation status
- Vulnerable (IUCN 3.1)

Scientific classification
- Kingdom: Animalia
- Phylum: Chordata
- Class: Reptilia
- Order: Squamata
- Suborder: Iguania
- Family: Dactyloidae
- Genus: Anolis
- Species: A. bahorucoensis

Binomial name
- Anolis bahorucoensis Noble & Hassler, 1933

= Anolis bahorucoensis =

Species of lizard

Anolis bahorucoensis, the Baoruco long-snouted anole or Bahoruco long-snouted anole, is a species of lizard in the family Dactyloidae. The species is endemic to Hispaniola.
