= Hispaniolan desert gecko =

Conservation status
- Least Concern (IUCN 3.1)

Scientific classification
- Kingdom: Animalia
- Phylum: Chordata
- Class: Reptilia
- Order: Squamata
- Suborder: Gekkota
- Family: Sphaerodactylidae
- Genus: Aristelliger
- Species: A. expectatus

Binomial name
- Aristelliger expectatus Cochran, 1933

Species of lizard

The Hispaniolan desert gecko (Aristelliger expectatus) is a species of lizard in the family Sphaerodactylidae. The species is endemic to the island of Hispaniola.

== Geographic range ==
A. expectatus is found in both the Dominican Republic and Haiti, including associated small islands of the two countries, such as Beata, Tortuga, and Gonâve.

== Reproduction ==
A. expectatus is oviparous.
