= Gray tree frog (disambiguation) =

The gray tree frog (Dryophytes versicolor) is a small arboreal frog in the family Hylidae native to much of the eastern United States and southeastern Canada.

Gray tree frog may also refer to:

- Cope's gray tree frog (Dryophytes chrysoscelis), a frog in the family Hylidae found in the United States
- Gray foam-nest tree frog (Chiromantis xerampelina), a frog in the family Rhacophoridae found in Sub-Saharan Africa
