= Pholidoscelis maynardii =

Conservation status
- Least Concern (IUCN 3.1)

Scientific classification
- Kingdom: Animalia
- Phylum: Chordata
- Class: Reptilia
- Order: Squamata
- Family: Teiidae
- Genus: Pholidoscelis
- Species: P. maynardii

Binomial name
- Pholidoscelis maynardii (Garman, 1888)

Synonyms
- Ameiva maynardii Garman, 1888; Ameiva maynardi Schwartz & Thomas, 1975; Pholidoscelis maynardi Goicoechea et al., 2016

Species of lizard

Pholidoscelis maynardii, commonly known as the Great Inagua ameiva, the Inagua ameiva, and the Inagua blue-tailed lizard, is species of lizard, a member of the family Teiidae. The species is endemic to the Bahamas. Three subspecies have been described.

== Etymology ==
The specific name, maynardii, is in honor of American ornithologist Charles Johnson Maynard.

== Description ==
Males of Pholidoscelis maynardii measure an average of 72 mm (2.83 in) snout-to-vent length (SVL), and females average 70 mm (2.76 in) SVL.

== Diet ==
Pholidoscelis maynardii is mainly insectivorous, however, little is known of its natural history.

== Habitat ==
Pholidoscelis maynardii is often encountered in the upper beach zone. It prefers sandy and loamy areas, but is also found in rocky and sparse vegetative areas.

== Reproduction ==
Pholidoscelis maynardii is oviparous.

== Subspecies and geographic distribution ==
Three subspecies are recognized as being valid, including the nominotypical subspecies. The species is found only in Inagua, Bahamas.

- Pholidoscelis maynardii maynardi Garman, 1888 – northern and western coasts of Great Inagua Island
- Pholidoscelis maynardii parvinaguae Barbour & Shreve, 1936 – Little Inagua
- Pholidoscelis maynardii uniformis Noble & Klingel, 1932 – eastern and southern portions of Great Inagua Island
