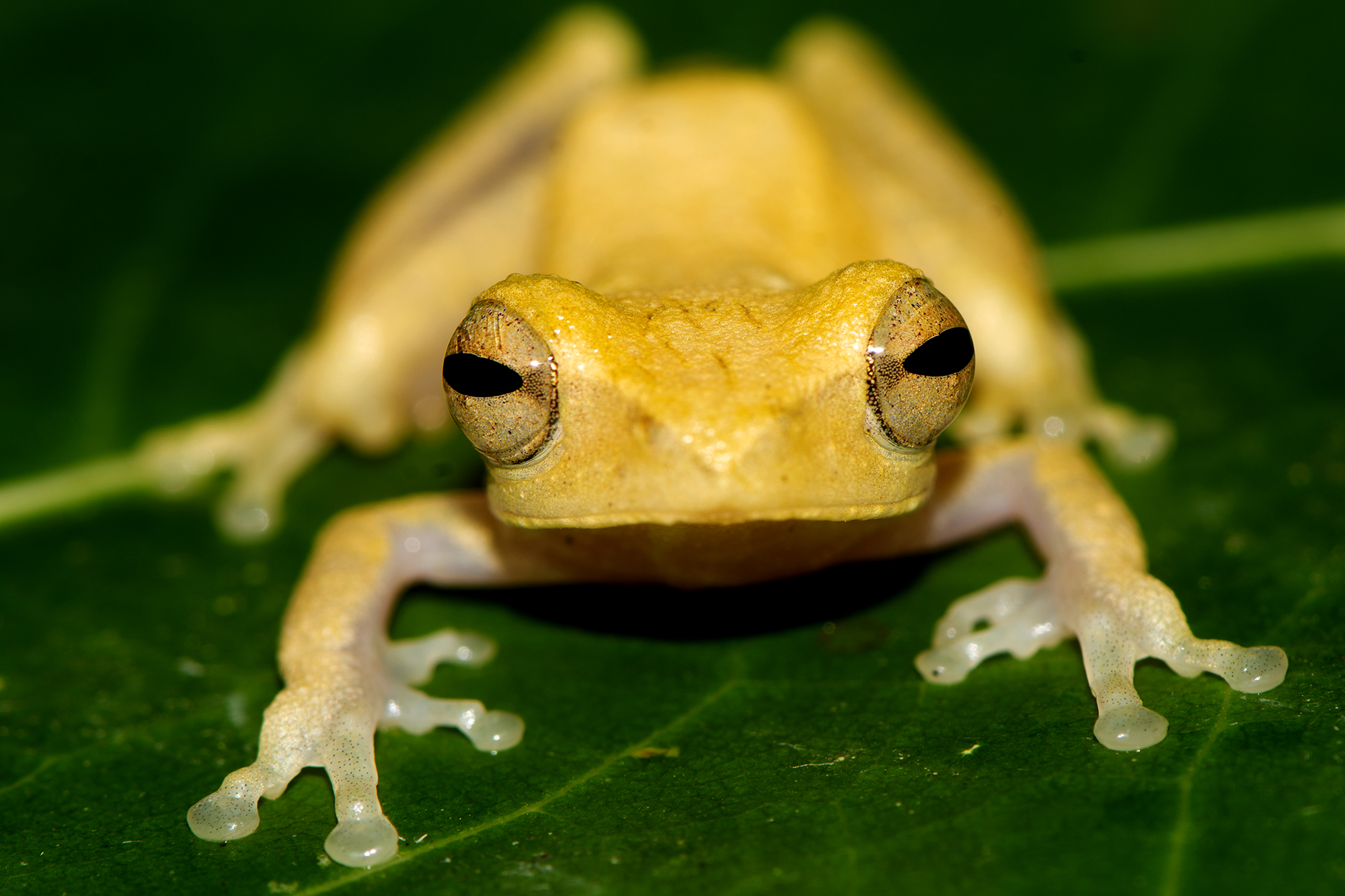

Scientific classification
- Kingdom: Animalia
- Phylum: Chordata
- Class: Amphibia
- Order: Anura
- Family: Rhacophoridae
- Genus: Chirixalus
- Species: C. pantaiselatan

Binomial name
- Chirixalus pantaiselatan (Munir, Hamidy, Kusrini, Kennedi, Ridha, Qayyim, Rafsanzani, and Nishikawa, 2021)

= Chirixalus pantaiselatan =

Species of frog

Chirixalus pantaiselatan is a species of frog in the family Rhacophoridae. The species was discovered in 2021 by a group of students from the Bogor Agricultural Institute during a citizen science event. The species has only been found at the Leuweung Sancang Nature Reserve in Indonesia. It is a sister species of Chirixalus trilaksonoi.

== Morphology ==
The adult male frog measures 25.3–28.9 mm in snout-vent length. This frog can change color: Specimens collected at night appeared brown in color on the dorsum and pink-white on the belly and undersurfaces. Specimens observed during the day were pale yellow to light brown in color on the dorsum. There are dark transverse bands of color across the fore and hind limbs. The iris of the eye is purple in color. There is some silver coloration and dark spots near the mouth and a dark brown spot on each eyelid to the intraorbital region and a diamond-shaped mark on the suprascapular area. The tympanum is dark brown in color.

== Habitat and range ==
The frog is currently known solely from the type locality, Leuweung Sancang Nature Reserve. Male frogs were observed perched on plants about 50 cm over the water of a pond.

== Etymology ==
Scientists named this frog for the Indonesian words for "coast" and "south": "Pantai" and "selatan." In Indonesian, its name is "katak-pucat pantaiselatan."
