= Chirixalus cherrapunjiae =

Conservation status
- Data Deficient (IUCN 3.1)

Scientific classification
- Kingdom: Animalia
- Phylum: Chordata
- Class: Amphibia
- Order: Anura
- Family: Rhacophoridae
- Genus: Chirixalus
- Species: C. cherrapunjiae

Binomial name
- Chirixalus cherrapunjiae (Roonwal & Kripalani, 1966)

Synonyms
- Philautus cherrapunjiae Roonwal and Kripalani, 1966; Chiromantis cherrapunjiae (Roonwal & Kripalani, 1966)

Species of frog

Chirixalus cherrapunjiae, with the common names Cherrapunji bubble-nest frog or Cherrapunji bush frog, is a species of frog in the family Rhacophoridae. It is endemic to north-eastern India.

== Taxonomy and systematics ==
This species was originally placed in the genus Philautus and later moved to Chirixalus because it was described as having free-living tadpoles. For a time, Chirixalus was recognized as synonymous with Chiromantis but is now recognized as a separate genus.

== Distribution and habitat ==
It is endemic to Meghalaya and Arunachal Pradesh states of north-eastern India. There is little information on habitat and ecological requirements of this species.
