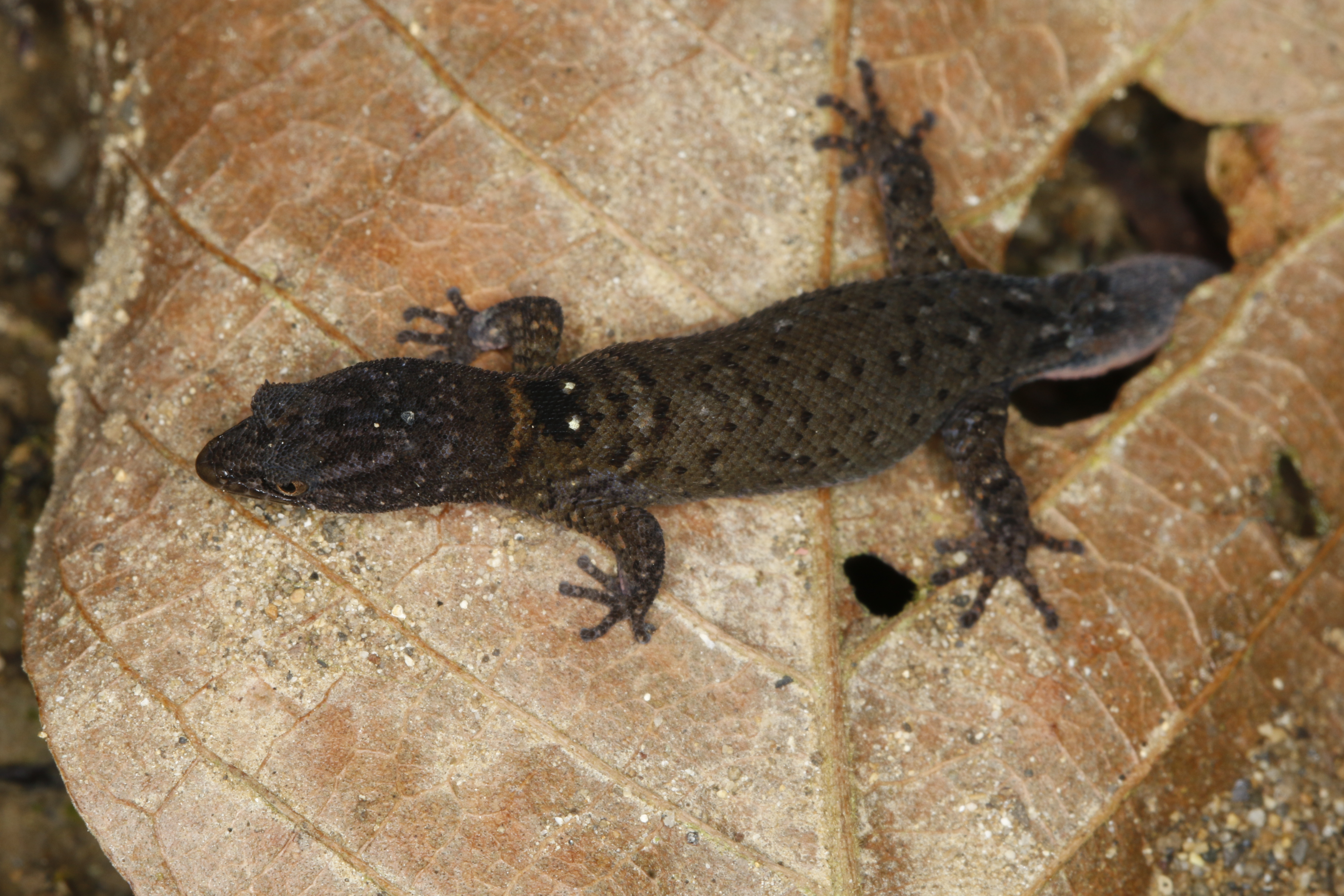

Conservation status
- Near Threatened (IUCN 3.1)

Scientific classification
- Kingdom: Animalia
- Phylum: Chordata
- Class: Reptilia
- Order: Squamata
- Suborder: Gekkota
- Family: Sphaerodactylidae
- Genus: Sphaerodactylus
- Species: S. darlingtoni

Binomial name
- Sphaerodactylus darlingtoni Shreve, 1968
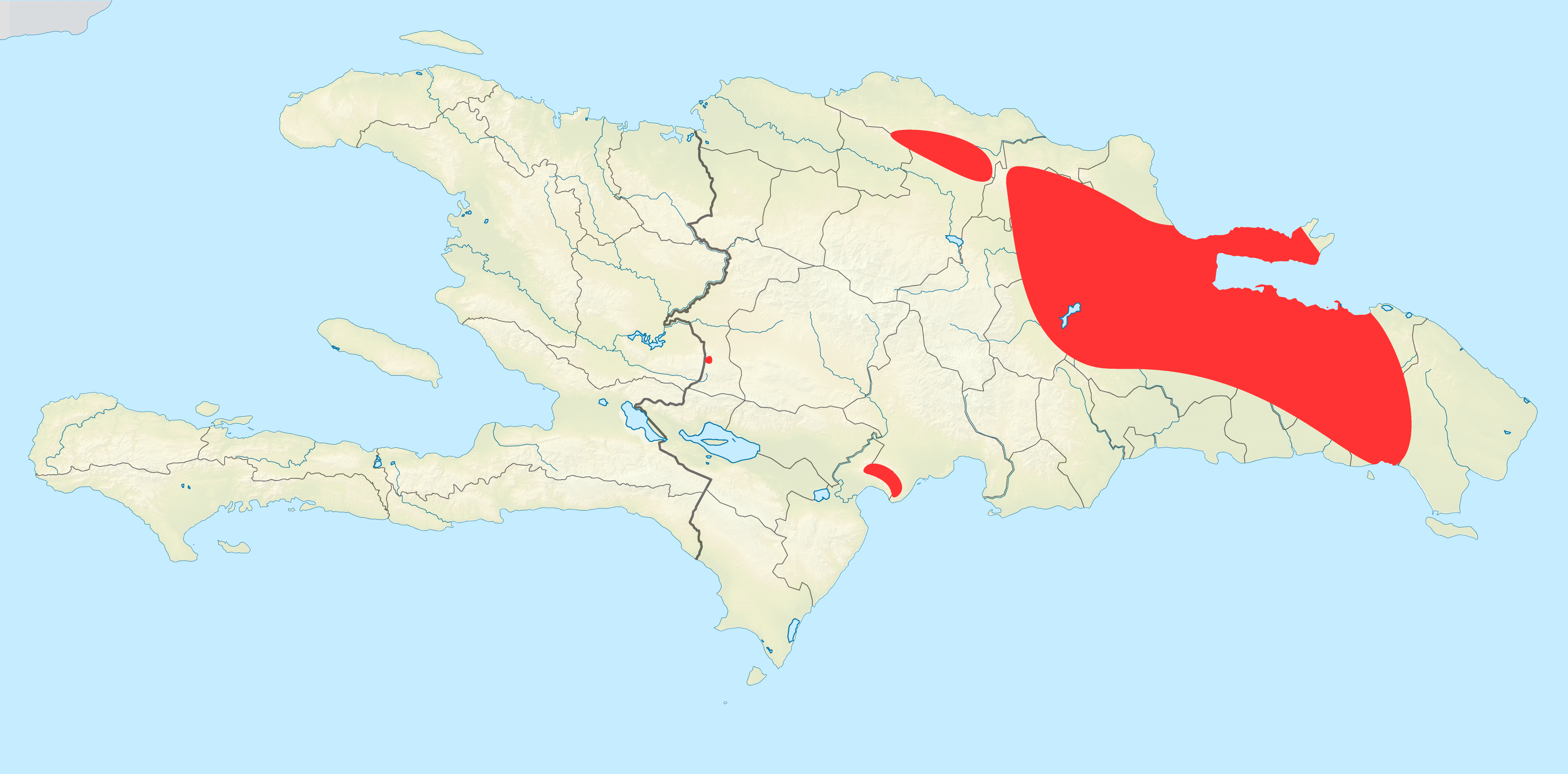
- Distribution of Sphaerodactylus darlingtoni (known range in red)

= Darlington's least gecko =

Species of lizard

Darlington's least gecko (Sphaerodactylus darlingtoni) is a species of lizard in the family Sphaerodactylidae. The species is endemic to the Dominican Republic.

== Etymology ==
The specific name, darlingtoni, is in honor of American entomologist Philip Jackson Darlington, Jr., who collected the holotype.

The subspecific name, noblei, is in honor of American herpetologist Gladwyn Kingsley Noble.

== Subspecies ==
Four subspecies are recognized as being valid, including the nominotypical subspecies.

- Sphaerodactylus darlingtoni bobilini Thomas & Schwartz, 1983
- Sphaerodactylus darlingtoni darlingtoni Shreve, 1968
- Sphaerodactylus darlingtoni mekistus Thomas & Schwartz, 1983
- Sphaerodactylus darlingoni noblei Shreve, 1968

== Habitat ==
The preferred habitat of Sphaerodactylus darlingtoni is forest at altitudes of 5–1,300 m (16–4,265 ft).

== Behavior ==
Sphaerodactylus darlingtoni is terrestrial.

== Reproduction ==
Sphaerodactylus darlingtoni is oviparous.
