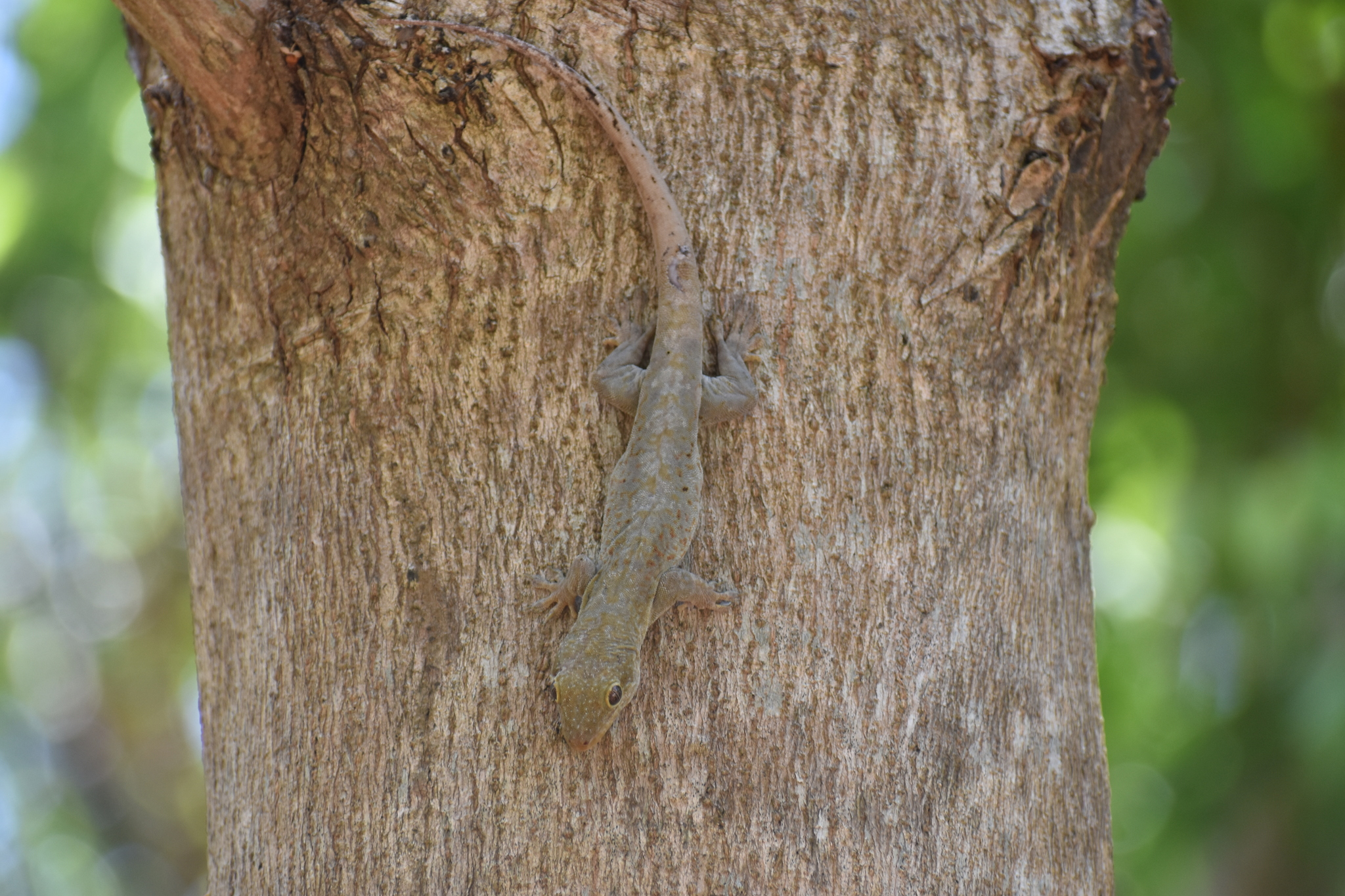

Conservation status
- Least Concern (IUCN 3.1)

Scientific classification
- Kingdom: Animalia
- Phylum: Chordata
- Class: Reptilia
- Order: Squamata
- Suborder: Gekkota
- Family: Sphaerodactylidae
- Genus: Aristelliger
- Species: A. georgeensis

Binomial name
- Aristelliger georgeensis (Bocourt, 1873)

Synonyms
- Idiodactylus georgeensis Bocourt, 1873; Aristelliger irregularis Cope, 1885; Aristelliger georgeensis — Schmidt, 1941

= Saint George Island gecko =

Species of lizard

The Saint George Island gecko (Aristelliger georgeensis) is a species of lizard in the family Sphaerodactylidae. The species is endemic to the Caribbean.

== Geographic range ==
A. georgeensis is found in Belize, on Colombian Caribbean islands, on Honduran Caribbean islands, and in Caribbean Mexico.

== Reproduction ==
A. georgeensis is oviparous.
