= Cochran's croaking gecko =

Conservation status
- Least Concern (IUCN 3.1)

Scientific classification
- Kingdom: Animalia
- Phylum: Chordata
- Class: Reptilia
- Order: Squamata
- Suborder: Gekkota
- Family: Sphaerodactylidae
- Genus: Aristelliger
- Species: A. cochranae

Binomial name
- Aristelliger cochranae Grant, 1931

Species of lizard

Cochran's croaking gecko (Aristelliger cochranae), also commonly known as Cochran's Caribbean gecko and the Navassa gecko, is a species of lizard in the family Sphaerodactylidae. The species was described in 1931 by Chapman Grant and named after notable American herpetologist and artist Doris Mable Cochran. The species received one of its common names from the loud croaking call of the male during the mating period.

== Description ==
A. cochranae has a snout to vent length (SVL) up to 63 mm (2.5 in) in males and 53 mm (2.1 in) in females. It has relatively short and massive legs. The colour of its body varies from beige brown to chestnut red and the back exhibits light spots. A dark chestnut crossband extends from the snout to the head, the nape, and the eyes. The largest part of the tail is dark grey to black. The hatchlings have clear white crossbands on the tail.

== Occurrence and biology ==
Cochran's croaking gecko is endemic to Navassa Island, an island between Haiti and Jamaica. It is relatively common despite its small habitat of 5.2 km² (2 sq mi). It is nocturnal and arboreal, which means that it lives and preys entirely on the branches or under the bark of ficus trees or fan palms (Thrinax morrisii ). Its diet consists of insects.
