= Aristelliger hechti =

Conservation status
- Vulnerable (IUCN 3.1)

Scientific classification
- Kingdom: Animalia
- Phylum: Chordata
- Class: Reptilia
- Order: Squamata
- Suborder: Gekkota
- Family: Sphaerodactylidae
- Genus: Aristelliger
- Species: A. hechti

Binomial name
- Aristelliger hechti Schwartz & Crombie, 1975

Species of lizard

Aristelliger hechti, known commonly as Hecht's Caribbean gecko or the Caicos gecko, is a species of lizard in the family Sphaerodactylidae. The species is endemic to the Caicos Islands.

== Etymology ==
The specific name, hechti, is in honor of American evolutionary biologist Max Knobler Hecht (1925–2002).

== Geographic range ==
The holotype of A. hechti was collected on Little Ambergris Cay, Turks and Caicos Islands.

== Reproduction ==
A. hechti is oviparous.
