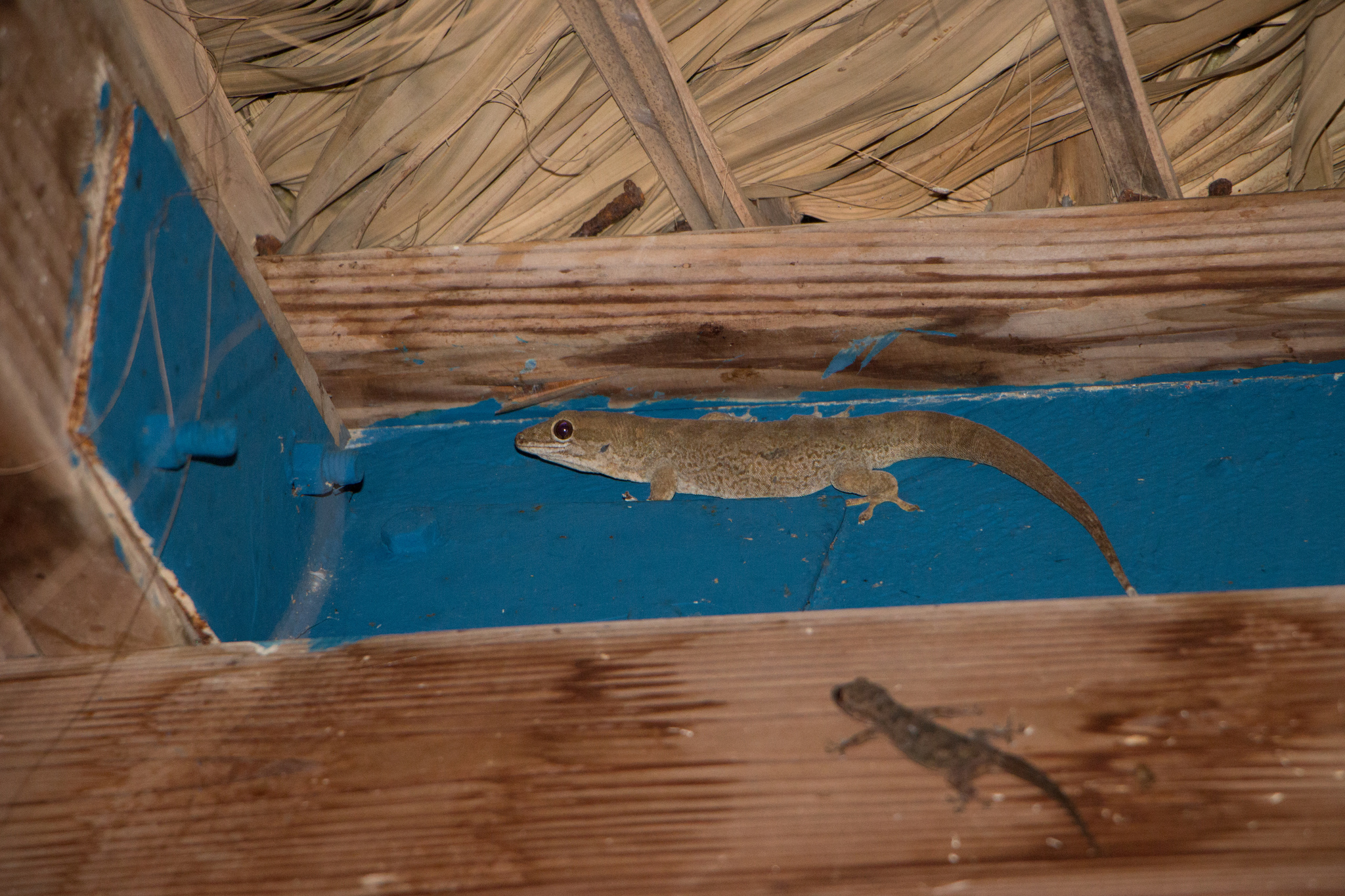

Conservation status
- Near Threatened (IUCN 3.1)

Scientific classification
- Kingdom: Animalia
- Phylum: Chordata
- Class: Reptilia
- Order: Squamata
- Suborder: Gekkota
- Family: Sphaerodactylidae
- Genus: Aristelliger
- Species: A. lar

Binomial name
- Aristelliger lar Cope, 1862

Synonyms
- Aristelliger titan Hecht, 1951

= Aristelliger lar =

Hispaniolan giant gecko

Species of lizard

Aristelliger lar, also known commonly as the Hispaniolan giant gecko and the spotted Caribbean gecko, is a species of lizard in the family Sphaerodactylidae. The species is endemic to the island of Hispaniola.

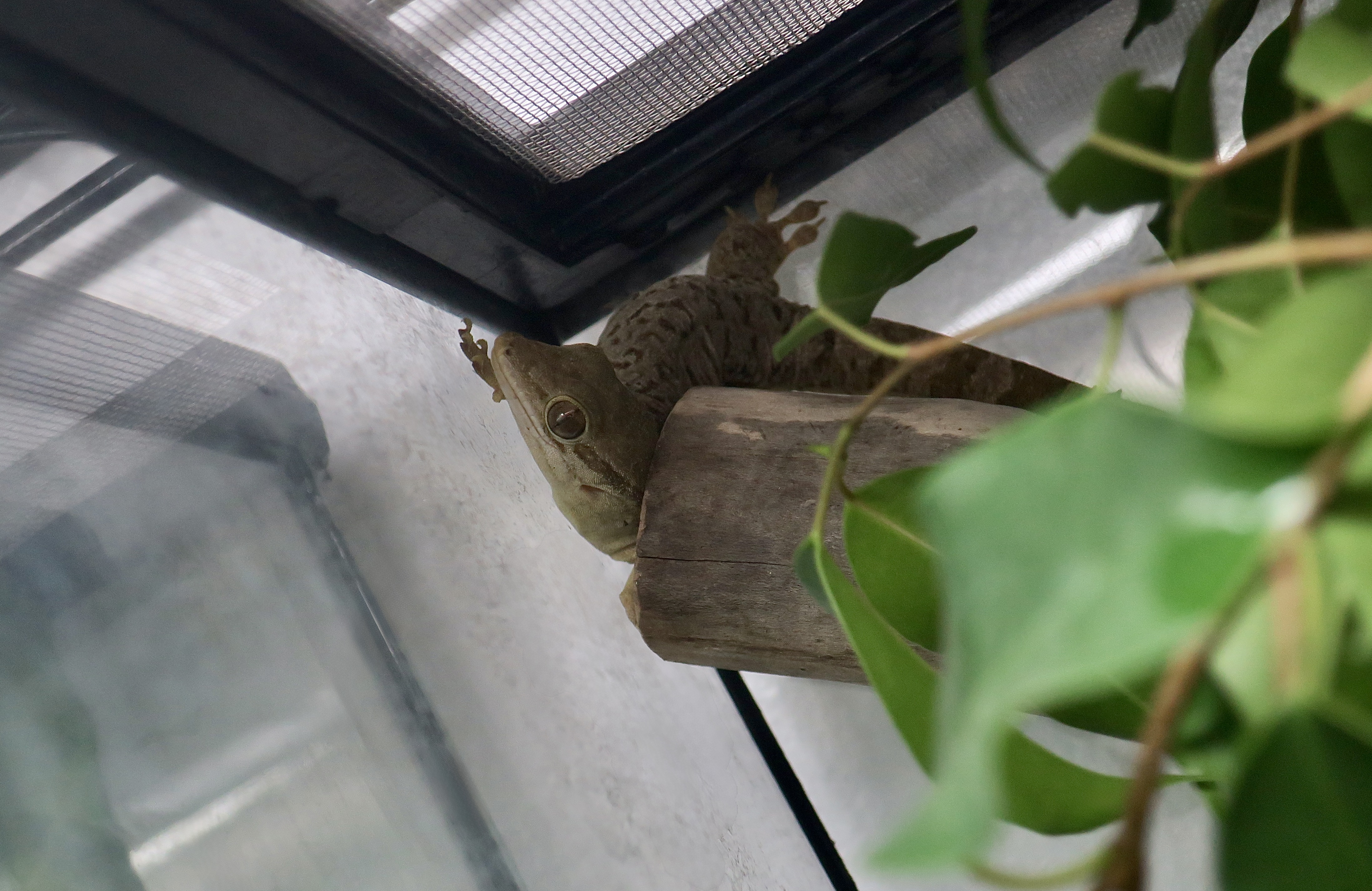
At The Gecko Gallery NYC.

== Etymology ==
The specific name, lar, refers to a Lar, an ancient Roman household god.

== Geographic range ==
A. lar is found in disjunct populations on Hispaniola, in both the Dominican Republic and Haiti.

== Habitat ==
The preferred natural habitat of A. lar is forest, but is also found in man-made structures in or near forest, such as houses and hotels.

== Description ==
A. lar attains a snout-to-vent length (SVL) of about 13 cm (5.1 in).

== Reproduction ==
A. lar is oviparous.
