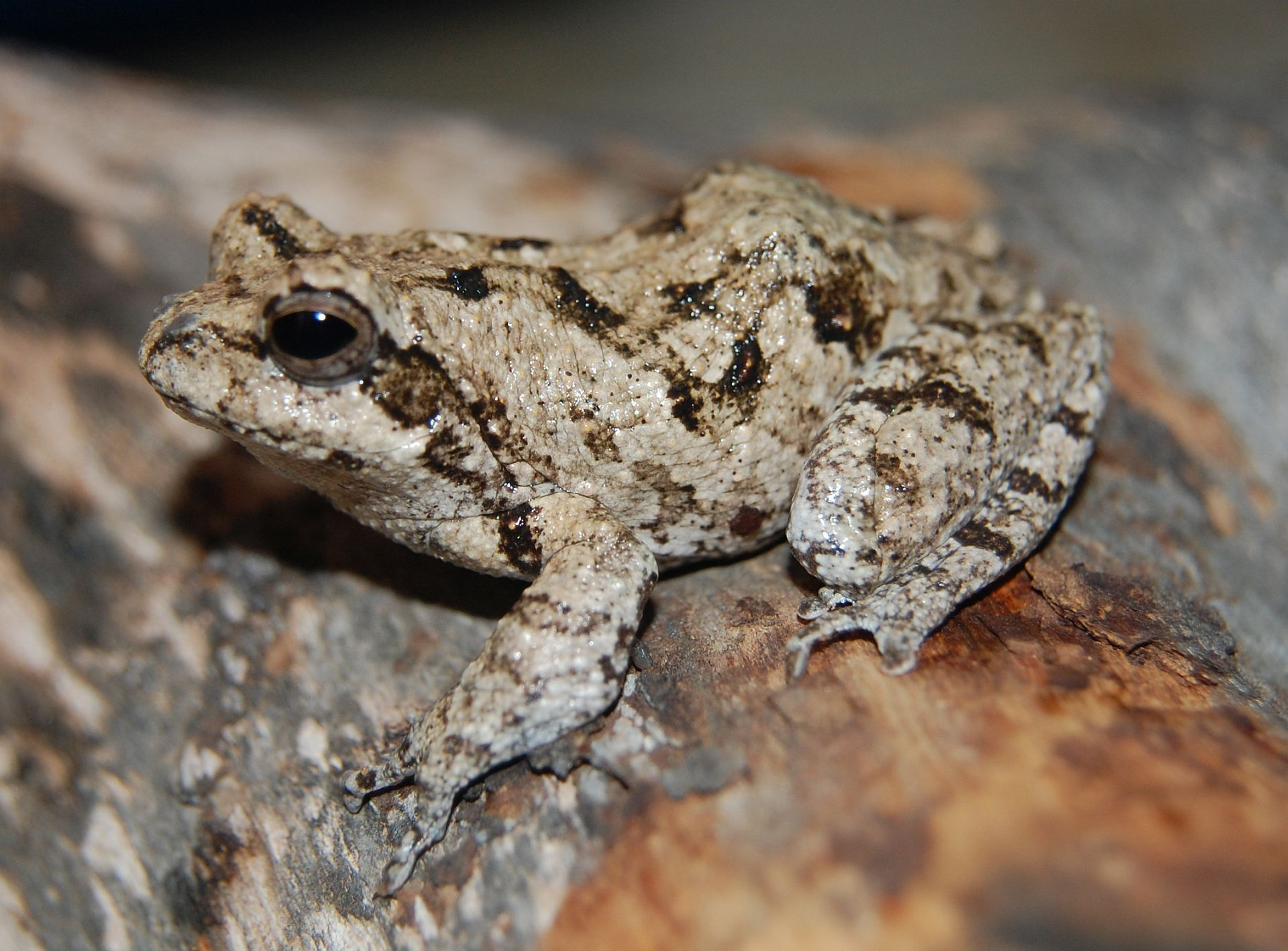
- C. kelleri in Oromia, Ethiopia

Conservation status
- Least Concern (IUCN 3.1)

Scientific classification
- Kingdom: Animalia
- Phylum: Chordata
- Class: Amphibia
- Order: Anura
- Family: Rhacophoridae
- Genus: Chiromantis
- Species: C. kelleri

Binomial name
- Chiromantis kelleri Boettger, 1893

Synonyms
- Hylambates enantiodactylus Calabresi, 1916; Chiromantis macrops Ahl, 1929; Leptopelis enantiodactylus — Ahl, 1931; Chiromantis petersii kelleri — Parker, 1932; Chiromantis kelleri — Poynton, 2000

= Chiromantis kelleri =

Species of frog

Chiromantis kelleri is a species of frog in the family Rhacophoridae. It is found in eastern and southern Ethiopia, northern Kenya, and Somalia; its range probably extends into South Sudan. The specific name kelleri honours Conrad Keller who collected the type series. Common name Keller's foam-nest frog has been proposed for it.

== Description ==
Males grow to a snout–vent length of 56 mm (2.2 in) and females to 92 mm (3.6 in). The dorsum is rough and has usually grey and brown colouration, sometimes with darker markings. The throat is grey in males. The belly is darkened. The fingers and the toes are partially webbed and bear small terminal discs. The male advertisement call is a slow creak.

== Habitat and conservation ==
Chiromantis kelleri occurs in arid savanna and shrubland. Breeding takes place in temporary pools and involves foam nests. It is a widespread and not particularly rare species that appears to tolerate extreme environmental conditions. It could be threatened by environmental degradation caused by human settlement and expansion, and the resulting increase in livestock, although it appears to be reasonably adaptable. It probably occurs in some protected areas, for example Omo and Mago National Parks in southern Ethiopia.

== See also ==
- Chiromantis petersii
- African foam-nest tree frog
- Grey foam-nest tree frog
