= Chirixalus dudhwaensis =

Conservation status
- Vulnerable (IUCN 3.1)

Scientific classification
- Kingdom: Animalia
- Phylum: Chordata
- Class: Amphibia
- Order: Anura
- Family: Rhacophoridae
- Genus: Chirixalus
- Species: C. dudhwaensis

Binomial name
- Chirixalus dudhwaensis Ray, 1992

Synonyms
- Chiromantis dudhwaensis (Ray, 1992)

Species of frog

Chirixalus dudhwaensis, commonly known as the Dudhwa tree frog, is a species of frog in the family Rhacophoridae. It is endemic to India, being only known from the vicinity of the type locality, Dudhwa National Park in Uttar Pradesh.

This semi-arboreal frog lives in scrub forests, grasslands, and other rural areas, including rice plantations and other farms. This frog has been observed between 100 and 700 meters above sea level, usually about 1.5 m off the ground, perched on vegetation in marshy places.

The female frog seeks permanent bodies of stagnant water to lay her eggs.

The IUCN classifies this frog as vulnerable to extinction because it has a small range that is subject to continued habitat loss, associated with urbanization and other causes. This frog is also in danger from pesticides and road collisions. Its range includes protected parks: Dudhwa National Park, Rajaji National Park, Haldwani Pilibit Tiger Reserve, and Katerniaghat Wildlife Sanctuary.
