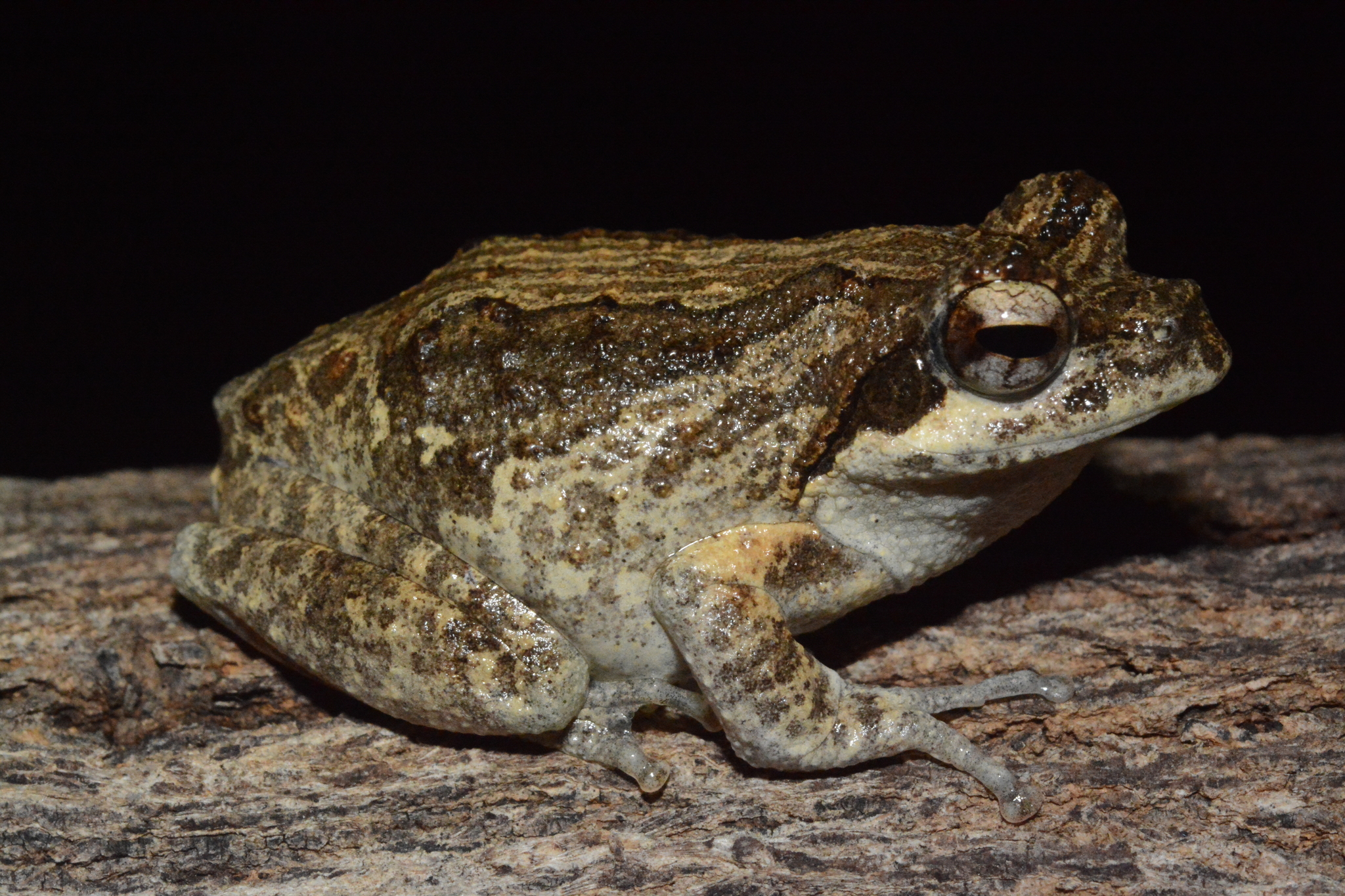

Conservation status
- Least Concern (IUCN 3.1)

Scientific classification
- Kingdom: Animalia
- Phylum: Chordata
- Class: Amphibia
- Order: Anura
- Family: Rhacophoridae
- Genus: Chiromantis
- Species: C. petersii

Binomial name
- Chiromantis petersii Boulenger, 1882

Synonyms
- Chiromantis albescens Ahl, 1929; Chiromantis fasciatus Ahl, 1929; Chiromantis pygmaeus Ahl, 1930; Chiromantis pictus Ahl, 1931; Chiromantis rugosus Ahl, 1931

= Chiromantis petersii =

Species of frog

Chiromantis petersii is a species of frog in the family Rhacophoridae. It is found in Kenya and Tanzania and is broadly distributed in the inland areas of both countries. Chiromantis kelleri was previously considered subspecies of Chiromantis petersii, but is currently recognized as a distinct species. These two species are sympatric in northern Kenya.

== Etymology and common names ==
The specific name petersii honours Wilhelm Peters, German zoologist and traveller. Common names Peters' foam-nest treefrog, Peters' foam-nest frog, and central foam-nest tree frog have been proposed for it.

== Description ==
Males grow to a snout–vent length of 45 mm (1.8 in) and females to 65 mm (2.6 in). The dorsum is rough and has usually grey and brown colouration, sometimes with darker markings. The throat is pale and may have black speckles. The fingers and the toes are partially webbed and bear small terminal discs. The male advertisement call is a series of quiet creaks.

== Habitat and conservation ==
Chiromantis petersii occurs in dry savanna woodland, generally in areas receiving less than 800 mm rain per year. It also occurs in agricultural and suburban situations. Breeding takes place in temporary pools and involves foam nests. It is a widespread and reasonably common species. It is probably not experiencing significant threats, although it might locally be impacted by overgrazing. It is sometimes present in the international pet trade. It occurs in a number of protected areas.

== See also ==
- African foam-nest tree frog
- Grey foam-nest tree frog
- Chiromantis kelleri
