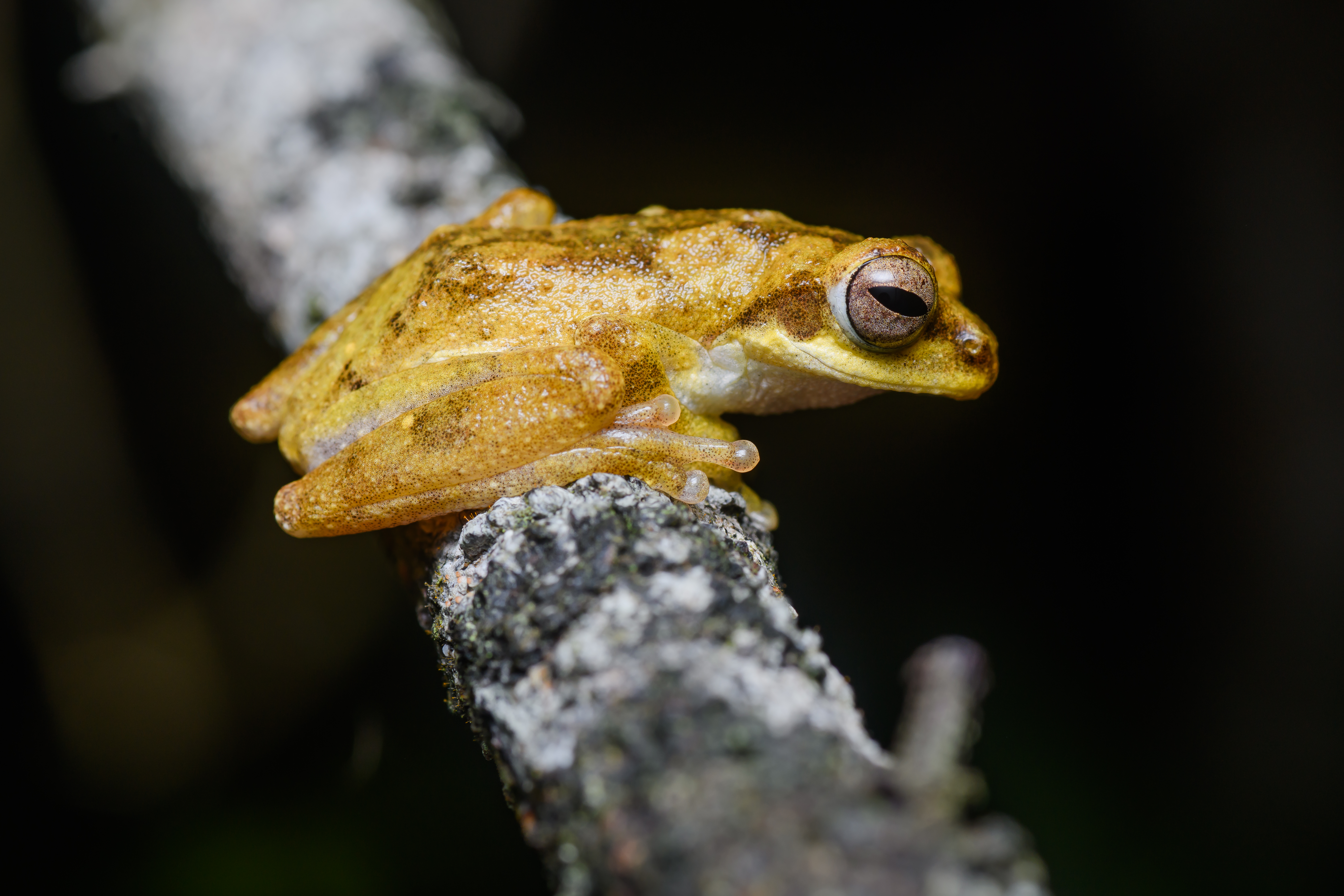
- Chirixalus nongkhorensis

Scientific classification
- Kingdom: Animalia
- Phylum: Chordata
- Class: Amphibia
- Order: Anura
- Family: Rhacophoridae
- Subfamily: Rhacophorinae
- Genus: Chirixalus; Boulenger, 1893

= Chirixalus =

Genus of amphibians

Chirixalus is a genus of frogs in the moss frog family (Rhacophoridae). Formerly used to classify Asian species of Chiromantis and later synonymized with that genus, it was removed from synonymy and resurrected in 2020.

== Species ==
The following species are now recognised in the genus Chirixalus:

- Chirixalus cherrapunjiae (Roonwal and Kripalani, 1966)
- Chirixalus doriae Boulenger, 1893
- Chirixalus dudhwaensis Ray, 1992
- Chirixalus nongkhorensis (Cochran, 1927)
- Chirixalus pantaiselatan (Munir, Hamidy, Kusrini, Kennedi, Ridha, Qayyim, Rafsanzani, and Nishikawa, 2021)
- Chirixalus simus Annandale, 1915
- Chirixalus trilaksonoi (Riyanto and Kurniati, 2014)
