= Aristelliger nelsoni =

Conservation status
- Endangered (IUCN 3.1)

Scientific classification
- Kingdom: Animalia
- Phylum: Chordata
- Class: Reptilia
- Order: Squamata
- Suborder: Gekkota
- Family: Sphaerodactylidae
- Genus: Aristelliger
- Species: A. nelsoni

Binomial name
- Aristelliger nelsoni Barbour, 1914

Synonyms
- Aristelliger nelsoni Barbour, 1914; Aristelliger praesignis nelsoni — Hecht, 1951; Aristelliger nelsoni — Powell & Henderson, 2012

Species of lizard

Aristelliger nelsoni is a species of gecko in the family Sphaerodactylidae. The species is endemic to the Swan Islands of Honduras. It was often considered a subspecies of Aristelliger praesignis prior to genetic testing establishing it as a separate species. It is rated as Endangered by the IUCN, owing to its small geographic range and strong recent population decline. This population decline is likely a result of competition with Hemidactylus frenatus (the Asian house gecko), which was introduced to Great Swan Island in 2007. Future development of the Swan Islands by the Honduran military or commercial enterprises would also threaten the survival of the species.

== Etymology ==
The specific name, nelsoni, is in honor of the collector of the holotype, George Nelson (born 1873) who was Chief Taxidermist at the Museum of Comparative Zoology, Harvard.

== Distribution ==
A. nelsoni is found on Great Swan Island and on Little Swan Island.

== Description ==
A. nelsoni may attain a total length (including tail) of 23.5 cm (9.3 in). It has 15 lamellae under the fourth toe.

== Ecology ==
A. nelsoni is oviparous.
