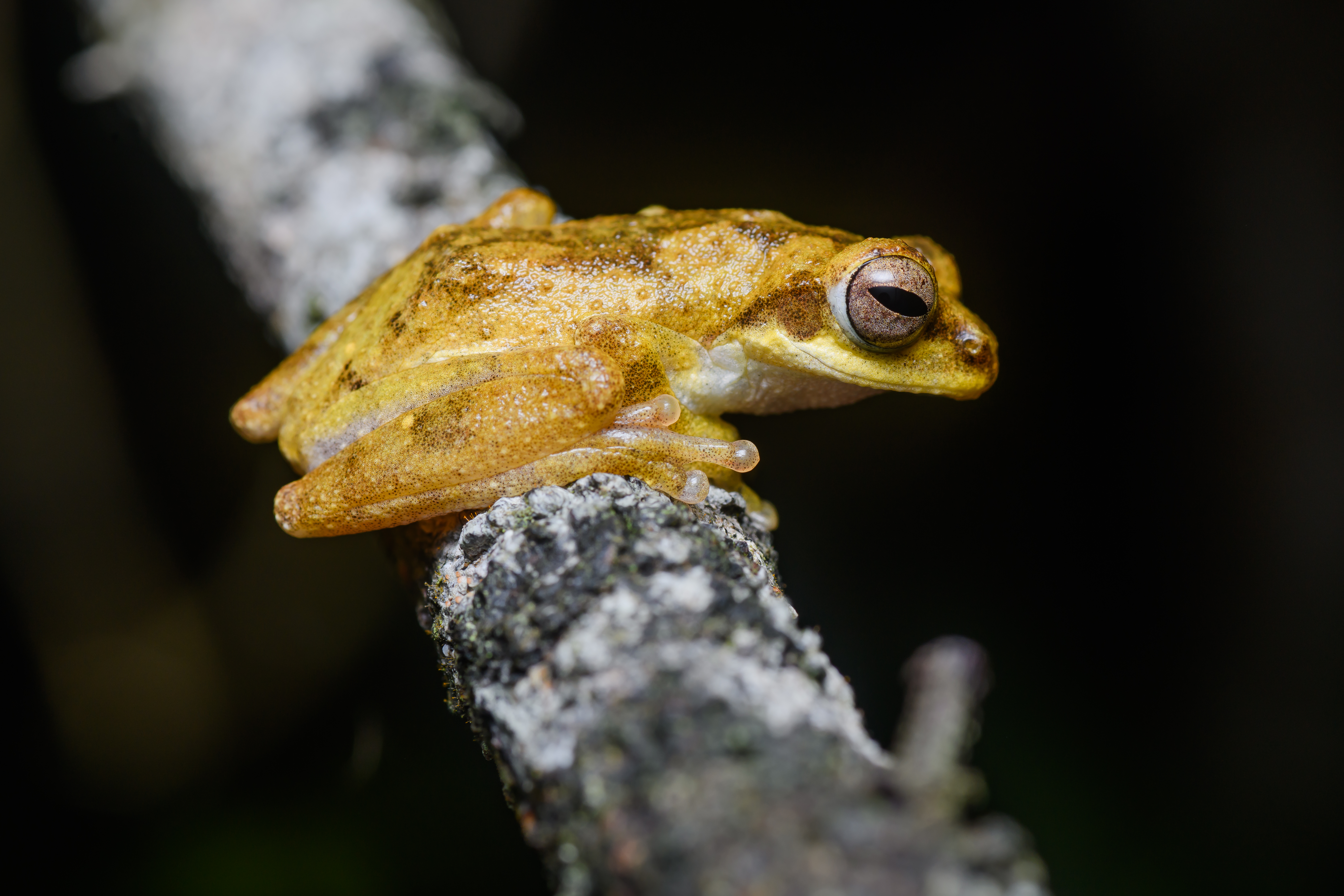

Conservation status
- Least Concern (IUCN 3.1)

Scientific classification
- Kingdom: Animalia
- Phylum: Chordata
- Class: Amphibia
- Order: Anura
- Family: Rhacophoridae
- Genus: Chirixalus
- Species: C. nongkhorensis

Binomial name
- Chirixalus nongkhorensis (Cochran, 1927)

Synonyms
- Philautus nongkhorensis Cochran, 1927; Rhacophorus (Chirixalus) nongkhorensis (Cochran, 1927); Chiromantis nongkhorensis (Cochran, 1927); Rhacophorus (Chirixalus) striatus Ahl, 1930; Chirixalus striatus (Ahl, 1930)

= Chirixalus nongkhorensis =

Species of frog

Chirixalus nongkhorensis, also known as the Nongkhor Asian treefrog, Nongkhor pigmy tree frog, Nong Khor bushfrog, and Nongkhor foam-nest treefrog, is a species of frog in the family Rhacophoridae. It is found in north-eastern India (Assam), Myanmar, Thailand, Cambodia, Laos, Vietnam, and Peninsular Malaysia.

== Habitat and conservation ==
Chirixalus nongkhorensis occurs in a wide range of both open and forested habitats, often affected by human disturbance, at elevations of 78–1,660 m (256–5,446 ft) above sea level. Breeding takes place around the rainy season adjacent to still bodies of water; the eggs are laid in foam nests attached to the underside of leaves overhanging water, to which the tadpoles drop upon hatching.

This species could be threatened by forests loss, although it appears quite adaptable. It is present in a number of protected areas.
