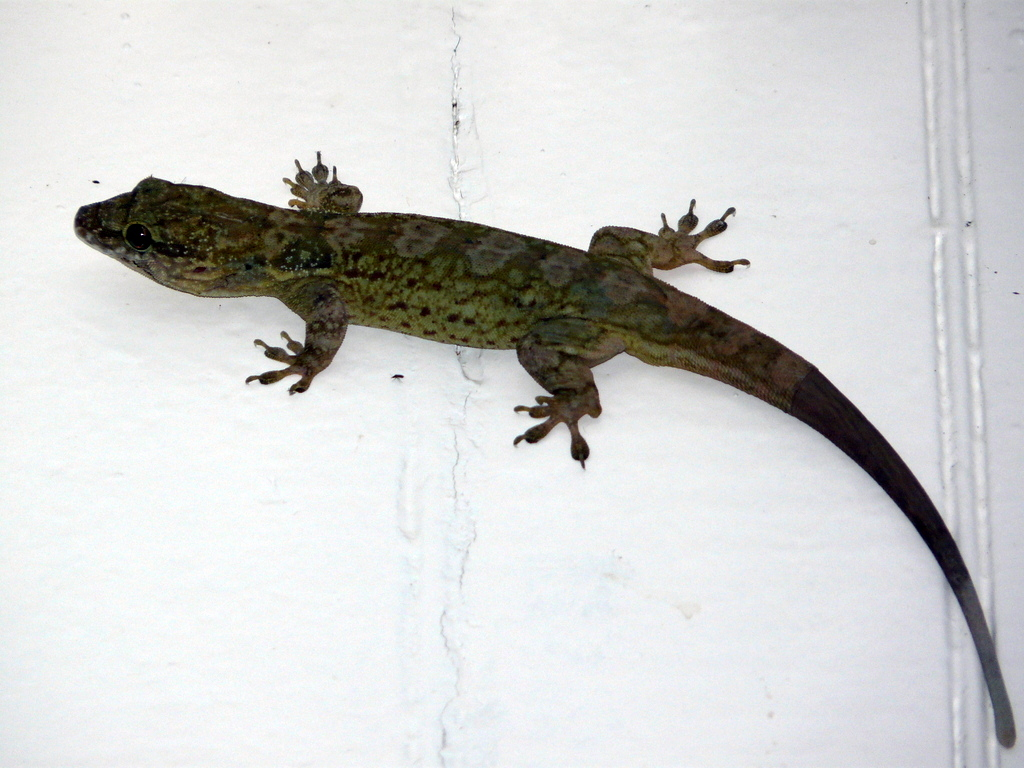

Conservation status
- Least Concern (IUCN 3.1)

Scientific classification
- Kingdom: Animalia
- Phylum: Chordata
- Class: Reptilia
- Order: Squamata
- Suborder: Gekkota
- Family: Sphaerodactylidae
- Genus: Aristelliger
- Species: A. praesignis

Binomial name
- Aristelliger praesignis (Hallowell, 1856)

Synonyms
- Hemidactylus praesignis Hallowell, 1856; Aristelliger praesignis — Boulenger, 1885

= Aristelliger praesignis =

Species of lizard

Aristelliger praesignis, is a species of gecko, a lizard in the family Sphaerodactylidae. The species is endemic to Jamaica and the Cayman Islands.

== Common names ==
Common names for Aristelliger praesignis include croaking lizard, Jamaican croaking gecko, Jamaican croaking lizard, and woodslave.

== Taxonomy ==
Another species, Aristelliger nelsoni, is sometimes considered to be a subspecies of Aristelliger praesignis.

== Geographic range ==
A. praesignis is found in Jamaica including the Bogue Islands, the Morant Cays, and the Pedro Cays. It is also found in the Cayman Islands.

== Description ==
Dorsally, A. praesignis is brown with darker markings and white dots. Ventrally, it is whitish. It may attain a snout-to-vent length (SVL) of 9.6 cm (3.8 in), with a tail 13 cm (5.1 in) long.

== Reproduction ==
A. praesignis is oviparous.
