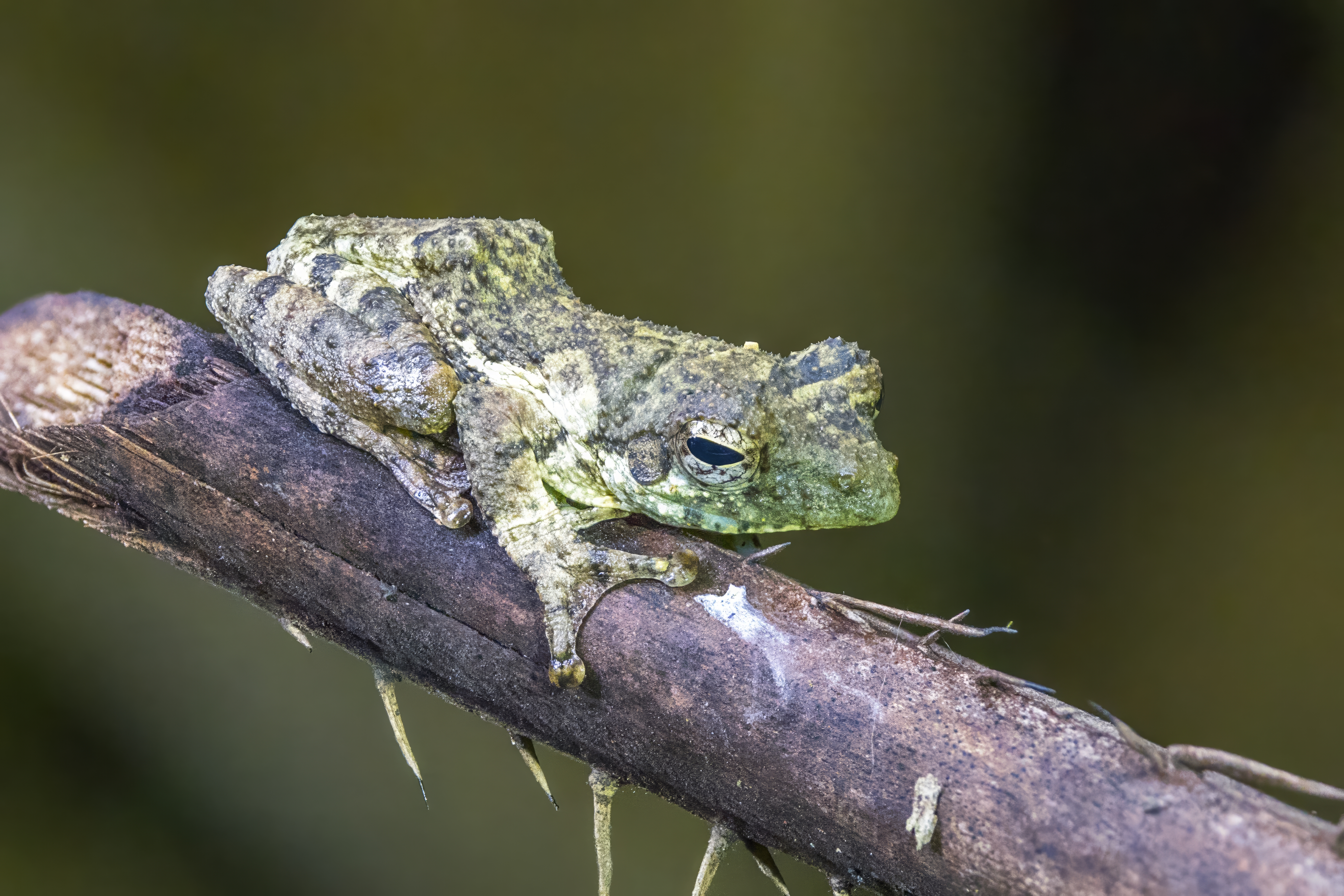
- Frog
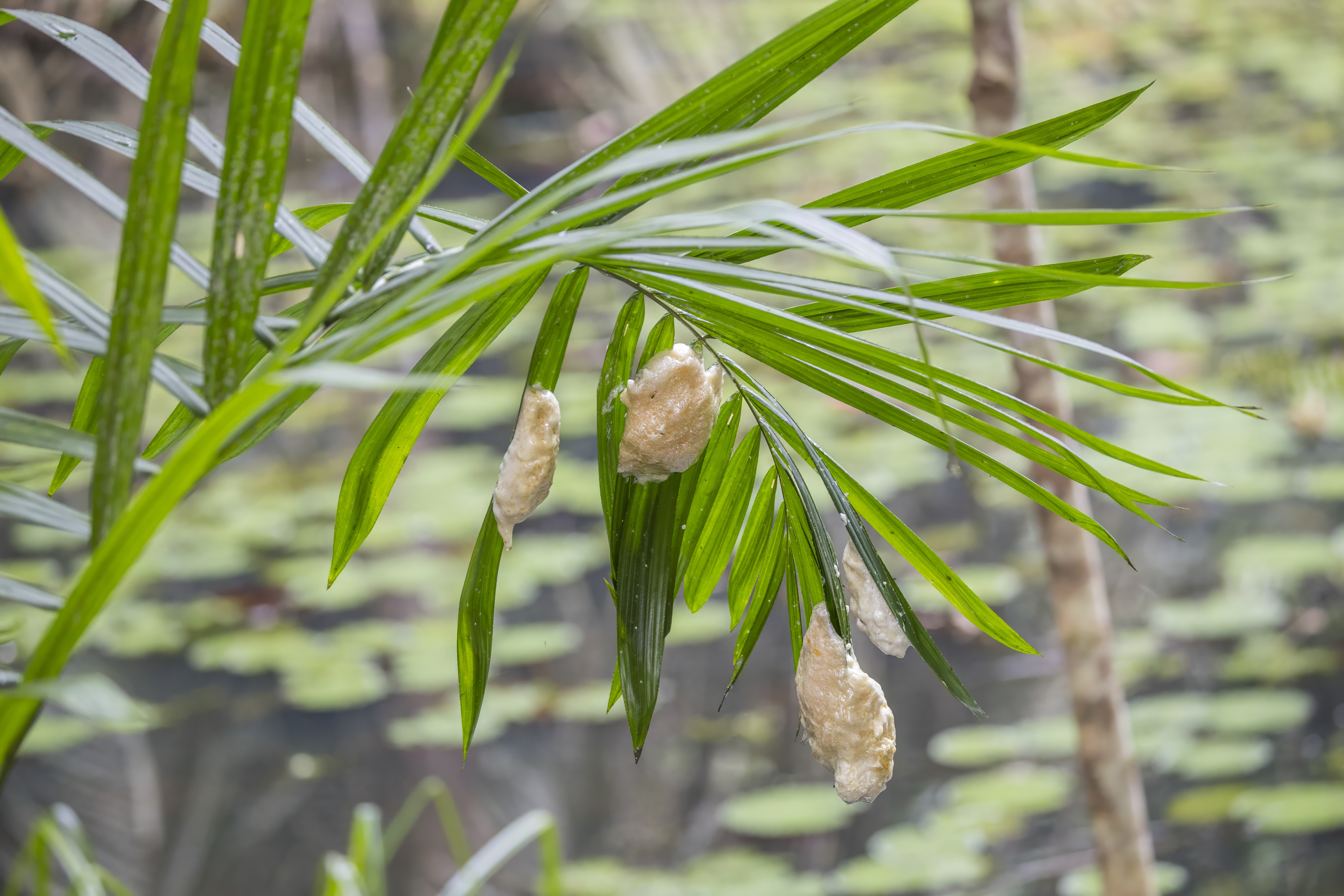
- Foam nest Both in Ankasa Conservation Area, Ghana

Conservation status
- Least Concern (IUCN 3.1)

Scientific classification
- Kingdom: Animalia
- Phylum: Chordata
- Class: Amphibia
- Order: Anura
- Family: Rhacophoridae
- Genus: Chiromantis
- Species: C. rufescens

Binomial name
- Chiromantis rufescens (Günther, 1869)
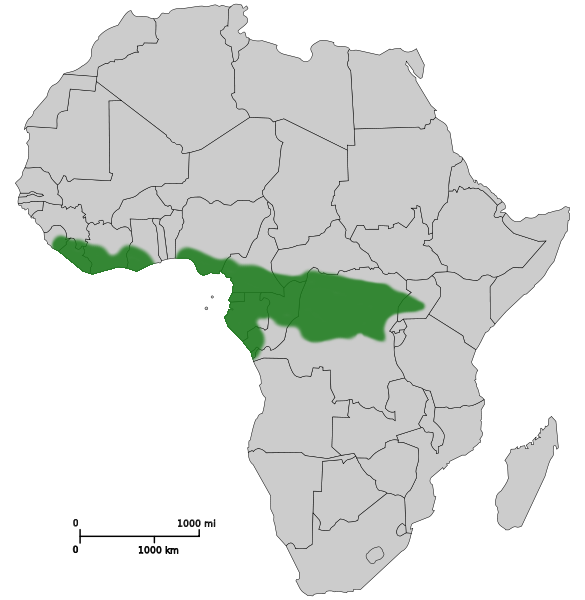
- African foam-nest tree frog distribution

= African foam-nest tree frog =

Species of amphibian

The African foam-nest tree frog or western foam-nest tree frog (Chiromantis rufescens) is a species of frog found in the tropical rainforests of Central Africa. The species has been found in nations ranging from Uganda to Sierra Leone, and has been found on the island of Bioko in Equatorial Guinea. It is likely to live in other nations in the region too, such as Angola but no scientific sightings have been recorded.

Chiromantis rufescens are observed to create foam nests that are large enough to accommodate 200 eggs only in pairs or after mating. A female C. rufescen can mate with up to three males. This species builds nests of foam above temporary pools and other water bodies.

== See also ==
- Chiromantis petersii
- Grey foam-nest tree frog
- Chiromantis kelleri
