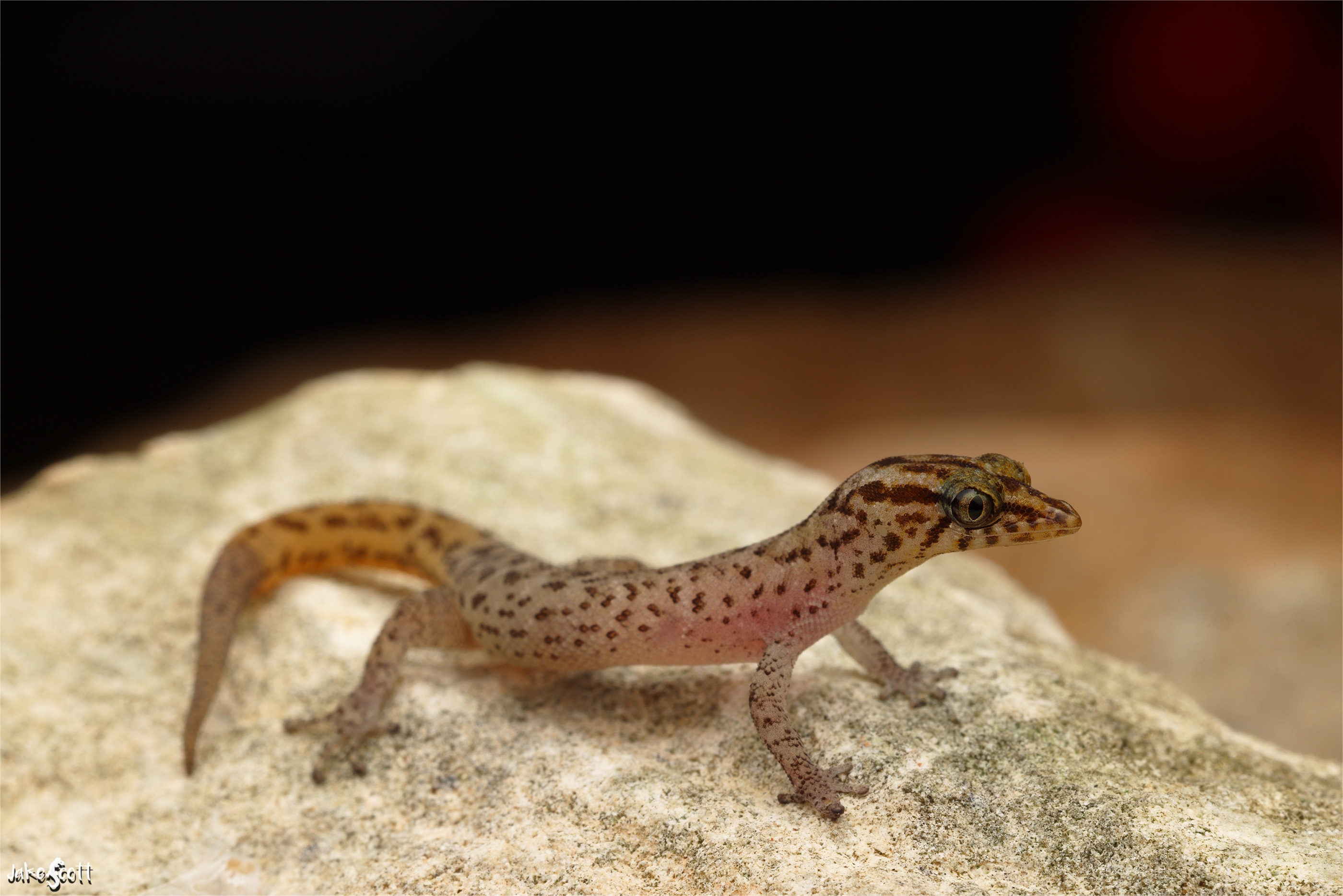

Conservation status
- Least Concern (IUCN 3.1)

Scientific classification
- Kingdom: Animalia
- Phylum: Chordata
- Class: Reptilia
- Order: Squamata
- Suborder: Gekkota
- Family: Sphaerodactylidae
- Genus: Sphaerodactylus
- Species: S. caicosensis

Binomial name
- Sphaerodactylus caicosensis Cochran, 1934

= Sphaerodactylus caicosensis =

Species of lizard

Sphaerodactylus caicosensis, also known as the Caicos banded sphaero or Caicos least gecko, is a species of lizard in the family Sphaerodactylidae. It is endemic to the Caicos Islands, where it is found on all of the larger islands from South to West Caicos, as well as some smaller outlying islets. It prefers arid habitats near beaches, but can also be seen in more moist places like tropical dry forest. A common gecko in the Caicos, it is extremely tolerant of human settlements and can frequently be encountered on rock walls or near houses. It is classified by the IUCN as being of least-concern.

== Taxonomy ==
Sphaerodactylus caicosensis was formally described by the American herpetologist Doris Mable Cochran in 1934 based on an adult female specimen collected from South Caicos in the Turks and Caicos Islands. It is named after the islands on which it was discovered. It has the common names Caicos banded sphaero and Caicos least gecko.

== Description ==
Sphaerodactylus caicosensis reaches a snout–vent length of 32 mm (1.3 in). It is sexually dimorphic in the color of its back.

== Distribution and habitat ==
Sphaerodactylus caicosensis is endemic to the Turks and Caicos Islands, an overseas territory of the United Kingdom located in the Lucayan Archipelago in the northern Caribbean. It is found on all of the larger islands in the Caicos Islands from South Caicos to West Caicos, as well as smaller outlying islets, like Long Cay off the shore of South Caicos. It prefers arid habitats near beaches, where it hides under debris such as rocks. It can also be seen in more moist places like tropical dry forest. This gecko is generally encountered sitting on rocks or small plants. They are extremely tolerant of human settlements and can frequently be encountered on rock walls or near houses. It lays eggs.

== Conservation ==
Sphaerodactylus caicosensis is classified by the IUCN as being of least-concern. Despite having a fairly small range, it is tolerant of human disturbance and introduced species, leading to a stable population. It is also known from several protected areas and is a common gecko in its range.
