= Chirixalus trilaksonoi =

Conservation status
- Endangered (IUCN 3.1)

Scientific classification
- Kingdom: Animalia
- Phylum: Chordata
- Class: Amphibia
- Order: Anura
- Family: Rhacophoridae
- Genus: Chirixalus
- Species: C. trilaksonoi

Binomial name
- Chirixalus trilaksonoi (Riyanto and Kurniati, 2014)

Synonyms
- Chiromantis trilaksonoi Riyanto and Kurniati, 2014

Species of frog

Chirixalus trilaksonoi is a species of frog in the family Rhacophoridae. There are two separate populations, both in Indonesia.

This frog has been found in paddy fields, perched on paddy plants, and on oil palm plantations. The frog has been observed between 191 and 400 meters above sea level.

The species' breeding habits have yet to be observed, but scientists presume they lay eggs in streams and grow through larval development, like other frogs in Chirixalus.

The IUCN classifies this frog as endangered because of its small range, which is undergoing continued degradation. Pesticides can also kill this frog.
