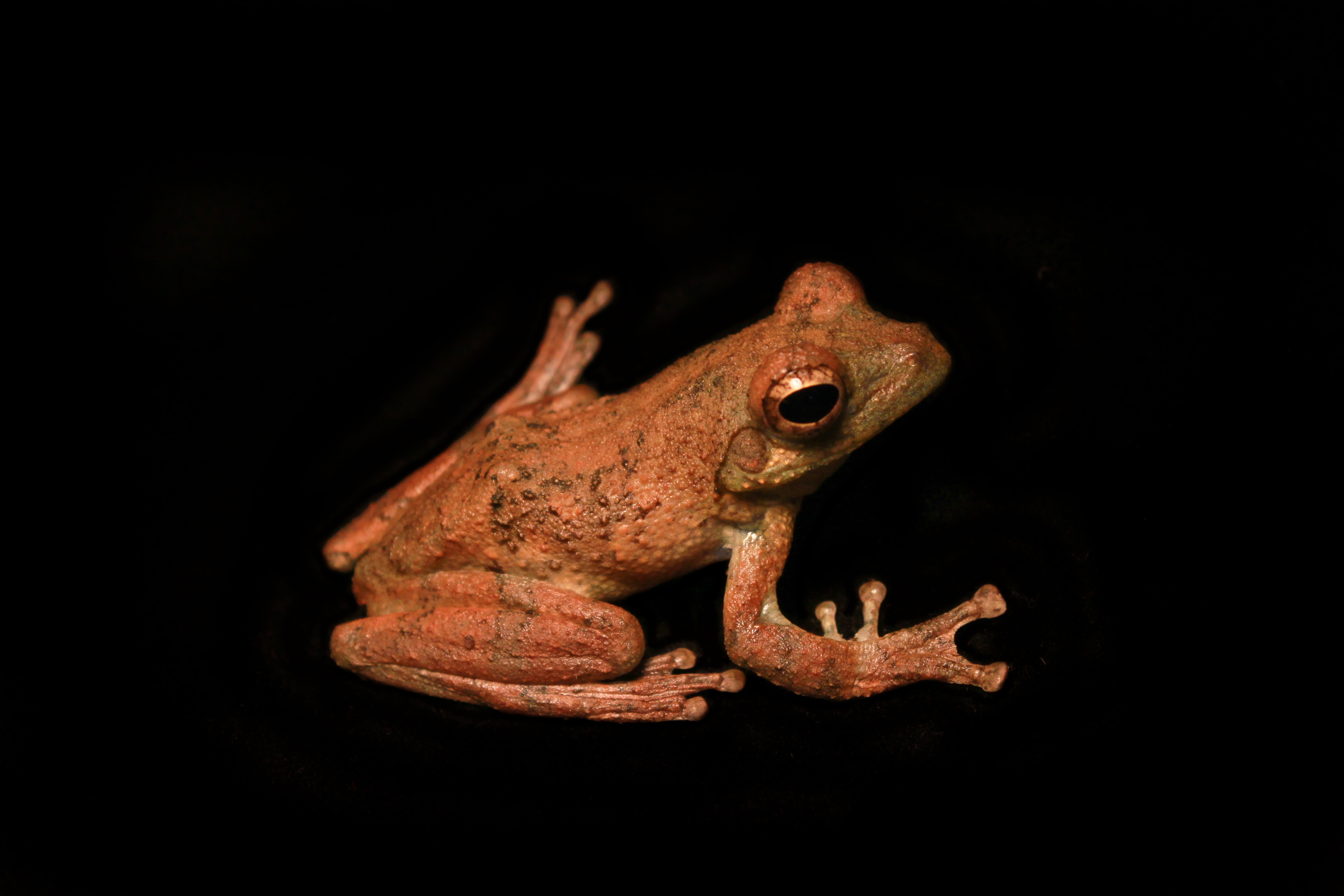
- Chiromantis rufescens

Scientific classification
- Kingdom: Animalia
- Phylum: Chordata
- Class: Amphibia
- Order: Anura
- Family: Rhacophoridae
- Subfamily: Rhacophorinae
- Genus: Chiromantis; Peters, 1854

Type species
- Chiromantis xerampelina Peters, 1854

Species
- 4 species (see text)

= Chiromantis =

Genus of amphibians

Chiromantis is a genus of frogs in the family Rhacophoridae, commonly known as foam-nest frogs or foam-nest tree frogs. It contains species from the Sub-Saharan African tropics. Following the molecular genetic study by Chen and colleagues (2020), the Asian species formerly assigned to Chiromantis have now been reclassified to the resurrected genus Chirixalus.

== Description ==
Chiromantis lay their eggs in terrestrial foam nests.

== Species ==
The following species are recognised in the genus Chiromantis:

- Chiromantis kelleri Boettger, 1893
- Chiromantis petersii Boulenger, 1882
- Chiromantis rufescens (Günther, 1869)
- Chiromantis xerampelina Peters, 1854
