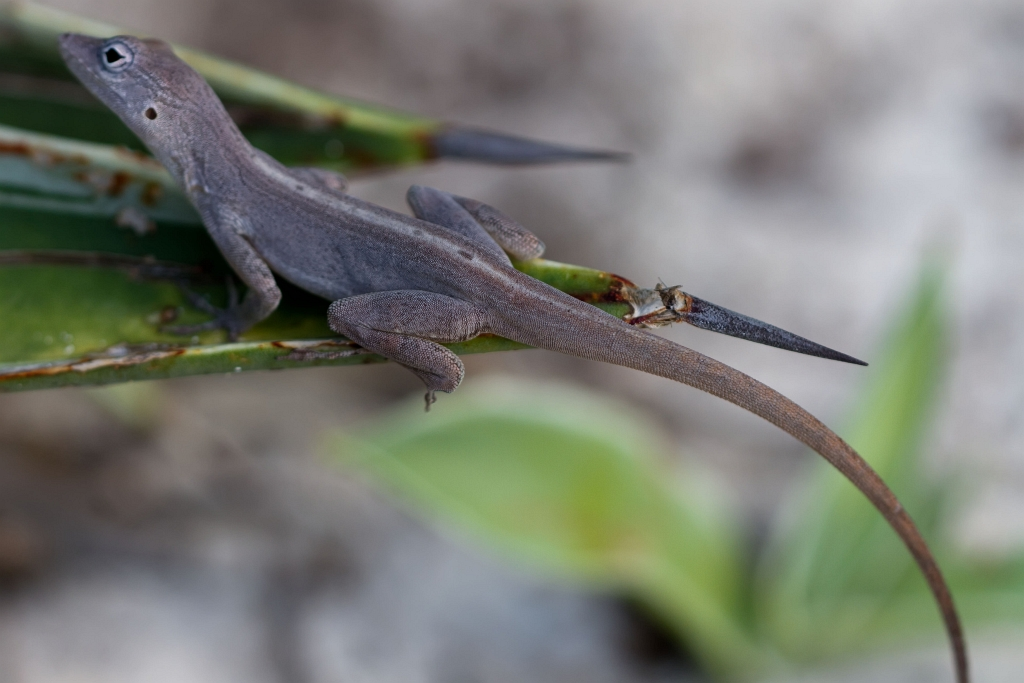

Conservation status
- Least Concern (IUCN 3.1)

Scientific classification
- Kingdom: Animalia
- Phylum: Chordata
- Class: Reptilia
- Order: Squamata
- Suborder: Iguania
- Family: Dactyloidae
- Genus: Anolis
- Species: A. scriptus

Binomial name
- Anolis scriptus Garman, 1887

= Anolis scriptus =

Species of lizard

Anolis scriptus, the southern Bahamas anole or Silver Key anole, is a species of lizard in the family Dactyloidae. The species is found in the Bahamas and Turks and Caicos Islands
