= Gilbert Klingel =

Gilbert Clarence Klingel (1908–1983) was a naturalist, boatbuilder, adventurer, photographer, writer, inventor, contributor to the Baltimore Sun, for a time affiliated with the American Museum of Natural History in New York and a member of the Maryland Academy of Sciences, and a curator and charter member of the Natural History Society of Maryland. He is best known for his book about the Chesapeake Bay, The Bay, which won the John Burroughs Medal in 1953.

== Books and articles ==
=== Inagua, The Ocean Island, and BASILISK shipwreck ===
Born in 1908, Klingel built his first boat when he was 20. In early 1930, at Conley's Boat Yard on Town Creek in Oxford, Maryland, Klingel supervised the wooden construction of a replica of SPRAY, the rotund sloop (eventually rerigged a yawl) in which Joshua Slocum became the first man to sail solo around the world in 1898. Klingel christened his 37' yawl BASILISK (after the common basilisk lizard that can run on the surface of water), and with the support of the American Museum of Natural History, it was fitted out as a biological laboratory, to be used for an expedition to gather information on rare species in the West Indies, especially lizards.

Klingel had organized an earlier research trip to Haiti to study the life history of reptiles there and had shared his discoveries with the American Museum of Natural History. With sailing companion W. Wallace Coleman (1907-1962), Klingel embarked from Maryland late November 1930 for a planned 18-month voyage to the West Indies. Battered and exhausted by a gale and unable to determine longitude due to a broken marine chronometer, they miscalculated the current and were shipwrecked on December 10, 1930, on the island of Inagua, the southernmost and second largest island in the Bahamas. Although most of his instruments were lost, Klingel decided nonetheless to stay, take pictures with his salvaged cameras, and explore the island.

This adventure was published in his first book, Inagua (also entitled The Ocean Island), a memoir of the voyage and a naturalist's survey of the island, including detailed pictures of flora and fauna. It has been translated into Estonian, Swedish, German, and Russian. This book (1940, 1942 British, 1944, 1954, 1957, 1961 AMNH paperback, 1997, 1999) has been out of print, but a new 2010 edition is now available.

=== The Bay ===
Klingel's second book, The Bay, illustrated by Natalie Harlan Davis (1898–1988), expanded from articles he wrote for the Baltimore Sun, describes the Chesapeake as he'd known it all the way back to his childhood decades earlier, and includes a detailed naturalist survey of sounds and sights both above and below the surface of the Chesapeake. In 1953 he was awarded the John Burroughs Medal from the John Burroughs Association for this book (1951,1967,1984).

=== Seeing Chesapeake Wilds ===
Photo-essay about the Chesapeake Bay's Eastern Shore, with preface and photographs by Byron Parker Shurtleff (1929-1999), a professor of photography at the University of Delaware, and the poetic text by Klingel (1970,1973,1977).

=== Boatbuilding With Steel ===
Klingel's final book, Boatbuilding With Steel: Including Boatbuilding With Aluminum, was published in 1973 (2nd edition 1991), and is considered a classic on the subject. The included chapter on aluminum is by noted yacht designer Thomas E. Colvin (1925-2014).

=== Articles ===
Klingel wrote articles for National Geographic and The Baltimore Sun, mainly on topics related to the Chesapeake Bay.

His article, "One Hundred Hours Beneath the Chesapeake," in the May 1955 issue of National Geographic featured color photos by Willard R. Culver (1898-1986) that were among the first taken from beneath a temperate estuary. These images were taken from inside a diving vessel invented by Klingel that was lowered into the waters off Gwynn's Island in the Chesapeake Bay.

Klingel also wrote three articles for Natural History - The Journal of the American Museum of Natural History, namely "Lizard Hunting in the Black Republic", 29(5):450–464, "Shipwrecked on Inagua", 32:42–55, and "The Edge of the Edge of the World", (1940) 45:68–73. The last recounts a dive with diving helmet on a coral reef and the edge of its 1,200 fathom drop-off, a half mile offshore Inagua.

Klingel shot some silent b&w film on his 1928–9 American Museum of Natural History research trip featuring rhinoceros iguanas on La Petite Gonâve, a small coral island off the south coast of Gonâve Island, in the Gulf of Gonâve, west-northwest of Port-au-Prince, Haiti.

In August 1932 he co-authored with Gladwyn Kingsley Noble (1894–1940) the American Museum Novitates number 549 entitled "The Reptiles of Great Inagua Island, British West Indies." Klingel found two new species of geckos and one new subspecies of the lizard Pholidoscelis maynardi.

== Metallurgist, Boatbuilder ==
During World War II, Klingel worked for ARMCO Steel Corporation in Baltimore, where he rose to Chief of Metallurgy in the course of his career there. In 1947 he built his first steel boat at home in Maryland on weekends, followed by others until he acquired property in 1953 on an island off Virginia's Middle Peninsula to establish the Gwynn's Island Boat Yard, where on a part-time basis he built his own workshop and slipway, and boats. Upon retiring from ARMCO in 1963 he moved to the island permanently.

Klingel built about a dozen steel sailboats in the 30' class, including Alvin "Al" Mason (1911-1995)-designed 31' sloops FREYA in 1953 and PLEIADES in ?, plus two Colvin-designed 34' Saugeen Witches - ACHATES in 1974, and Marconi-ketch-rigged INNISFREE in 1975. Klingel also built in steel a 42' ketch D'VARA in 1969, a 51' staysail schooner PIPISTRELLE in 1972, a 75' C/B 50 ton gaff ketch CLEMENTINE in 1971, and a 62' twin diesel motor yacht MANTEO (now named MARIAH) in 1970.

For retirement gunkholing the Chesapeake, in 1977 Klingel built for himself a 30' lateen-rigged steel scow motorsailer, GREEN HERON (nicknamed CREEK CRAWLER), the last boat launched (1978) from his yard.

In addition to these steel boats, Klingel also built the two diving bells (BENTHARIUM and its successor AQUASCOPE) that he used for research in the Chesapeake Bay. BENTHARIUM was a modified steel boiler with sand for ballast. The AQUASCOPE is on exhibit at the Calvert Marine Museum in Solomons, Maryland.

Gilbert C. Klingel died May 16, 1983, in Virginia at the age of 74.

There is a permanent exhibit about his life and work at the Gwynn's Island Museum, Gwynn, Mathews County, Virginia.

== Primary sources ==
- Barnes, Bart. Washington Post, February 13, 1986. "Photographer W.R. Culver, 87, Dies"
- Benouameur, Marcy Klingel. "Remembering the Gwynn's Island Boat Yard"
- Carson, Rachel Louise. "The Dark Green Waters," a review of The Bay in The New York Times, October 14, 1951
- Mathews Maritime Foundation, The Broadside, Vol.1 No.3 (Sept. 2008), "Boatbuilder Gilbert Klingel - Early Years"
- Mathews Maritime Foundation, The Broadside, Vol.2 No.1 (Jan. 2009), "Shipwrecked on a Desert Island"
- Mathews Maritime Foundation, The Broadside, Vol.2 No.2 (Apr. 2009), "Gilbert Klingel - A Man of Many Talents"
- Inagua ISBN 1-55821-547-6
- The Ocean Island (Inagua) ISBN 1-17974-239-7
- The Bay ISBN 0-80182-536-9
- Boatbuilding With Steel ISBN 0-87742-029-7
- Seeing Chesapeake Wilds ISBN 0-87742-011-4
