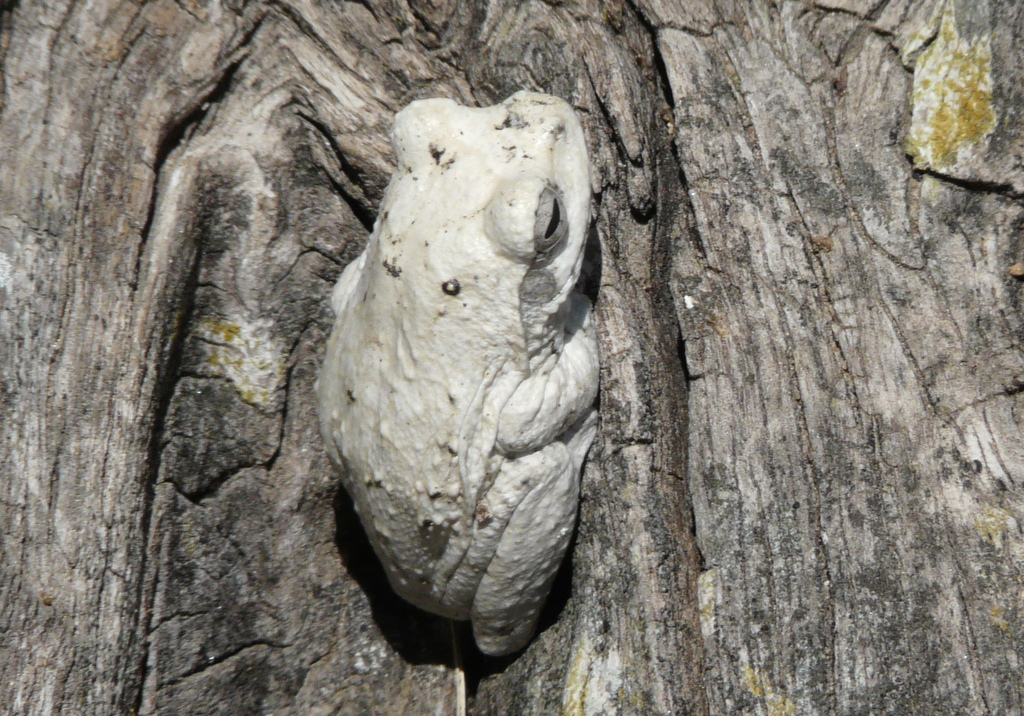

Conservation status
- Least Concern (IUCN 3.1)

Scientific classification
- Kingdom: Animalia
- Phylum: Chordata
- Class: Amphibia
- Order: Anura
- Family: Rhacophoridae
- Genus: Chiromantis
- Species: C. xerampelina

Binomial name
- Chiromantis xerampelina Peters, 1854

= Grey foam-nest tree frog =

Species of amphibian

The grey foam-nest tree frog (Chiromantis xerampelina), or southern foam-nest tree frog, is a species of frog in the family Rhacophoridae. They are found in southern Africa.

Its natural habitats are subtropical or tropical dry forest, dry savanna, moist savanna, subtropical or tropical dry shrubland, subtropical or tropical seasonally wet or flooded lowland grassland, intermittent freshwater marshes, arable land, pastureland, rural gardens, urban areas, heavily degraded former forests, ponds, and canals and ditches.

Grey foam-nest tree frogs are known for simultaneous polyandry, where female frogs have multiple mates on separate territories that guard the eggs and care for young. This behavior is owed to their external fertilization mechanism. During the mating process, the female frog produces a foam nest, typically on branches that hang above bodies of water, in order to keep her eggs moist as they develop. This practice is what gives the grey foam-nest tree frogs their name.

== Description ==
Grey foam-nest tree frogs are arboreal. Like other species in the genus Chiromantis, they have discs on their toes, and their outer two fingers are widely spaced and nearly at a right angle to their inner two fingers on each hand. The grey foam-nest tree frog typically has a snout length of 50–80 mm. Males have a snout-vent length of 43–75 mm, while females have a 60–90 mm snout-vent length. They have relatively impermeable skin, which allows them to survive dry spells under tree detritus. Their skin is slightly bumpy and dry. Their coloration ranges between white and brown and changes in response to temperature (see adaptations below). They tend to turn white when they die.

The grey foam-nest tree frog typically has a snout length of 50–80 mm. Males have a snout-vent length of 43–75 mm, while females have a 60–90 mm snout-vent length.

== Distribution and habitat ==
Grey foam-nest tree frogs usually reside in varying habitats, such as savannah, shrubland, forests, pastureland, and urban areas. There have been mentions of these frogs living in Australia in addition to their native range in southern Africa. They are considered habitat specialists, which refers to a species known to only breed in unsettled environments and unperturbed areas.

Grey foam-nest tree frogs dislike arid conditions and need humidity to survive; however, they can still be found in dry environments such as: dry forests, miombo, mopane, savannah, and cultivated areas in low altitudes. They are able to survive dry seasons under loose bark, hence why they are referred to as tree frogs. Large rainstorms stimulate an increase in breeding from these frogs, because high humidity decreases egg mortality and improves survival across multiple stages of life. Habitat destruction and disturbance impacts breeding abilities of these frogs.

== Ecology and behaviour ==
=== Reproduction ===
Mating activity of grey foam-nest tree frogs typically occurs at night from October to February in south-eastern Africa's wet summer months. These frogs choose to mate in arboreal settings, as they create their foam nests in tree branches overhanging bodies of water.

Female mate choice is often limited due to males forcing copulations. Mating primarily occurs on the branches of trees, making females very visible to males. Unpaired males may also intercept females by waiting at the base of a tree. Matings from male interception are often from genetically undesirable males. Over 90% of females mate with ten or more males in the production of a single clutch.

The female grey foam-nest tree frog begins the process of reproduction by producing a thick mucus-like fluid from its cloaca (a cavity at the end of the digestive tract in amphibians). During this process, the frog uses its hind legs to whip the mucus into elastic froth that will eventually serve as physical protection for the developing eggs. The female will leave temporarily to rehydrate before returning to the nest. Nest construction can take around five to six hours. Males then incorporate their sperm into the recently laid foam, fertilizing them. The next day, the female will return to its egg-laying site and add a layer of foam to protect the eggs from drying out.

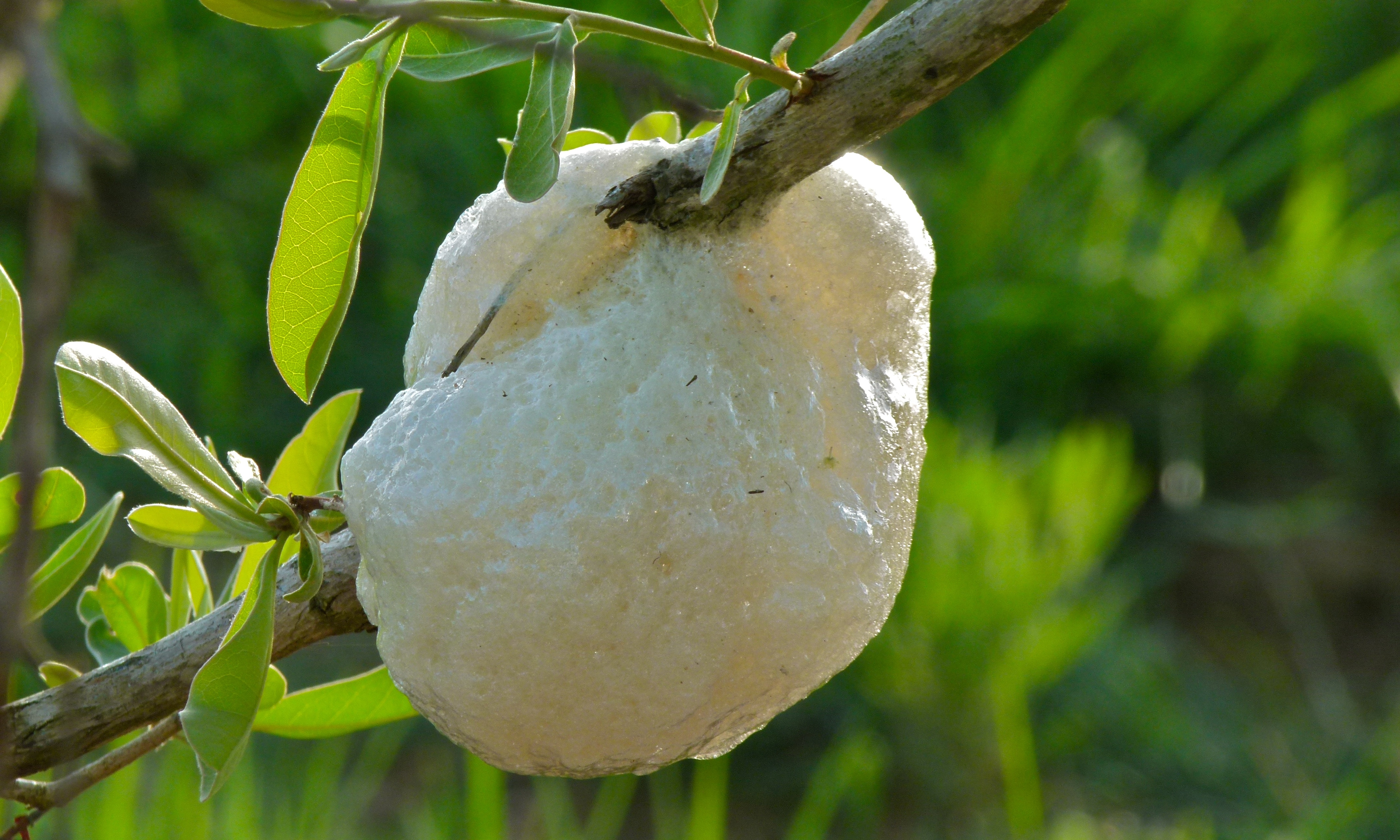
An example of a grey foam-nest tree frog nest hanging from a branch.

Foam-nest building behaviors and patterns have evolved several times. The foam nest made by the female provides different functions for aquatic and terrestrial breeding alike. Some grey foam-nest tree frogs breed exclusively in water. In these water-breeders, foam nests allow the eggs to be suspended in oxygenated water. Grey foam-nest tree frogs that reproduce on land create these nests to minimize drying out, temperature changes, and predation.

Polyandry, an important characteristic of the grey foam nest tree frog, has proven to substantially increase offspring survival. Polyandrous matings may provide eggs with additional nutrients via the seminal fluid from multiple males. These nutrients increase yolk availability for post-hatching development and increases survival of tadpoles. Sperm competition may also allow for increased egg interaction with steroids in seminal fluids, which may accelerate yolk metabolism and increase growth rate of tadpoles.

Offspring as a result of polyandry are more likely to survive than offspring of monogamous matings.

=== Fertilization ===
Egg deposition primarily occurs in still, fresh water in order to keep the eggs moist during development. A typical clutch size can be anywhere between 500 and 1250 eggs. Grey foam-nest tree frogs strategically hang their foam nests on branches of trees above water at differing heights. Polyandry can positively impact fertilization success and offspring production in grey-foam nest tree frogs. This might be because more male mates ensures that the female's eggs will be fertilized. A larger number of males means more sperm production, which therefore increases the likelihood the sperm are genetically compatible with the eggs and allows for a variety of different sperm-based traits.

Female grey foam-nest tree frogs lay eggs which are quickly fertilized by the male soon afterwards. Females also create foam for nests. Grey foam-nest tree frogs show remarkable adaptability in their oviposition sites, as they may lay their eggs in a variety of unique habitats. They typically choose environments hanging over bodies of water, but if this is not possible, they lay eggs on any other suitable objects. Occasionally, they lay eggs directly in water or grassy vegetation above water. These tree frogs are more likely to choose lightly wooded savannas and forested areas because these environments have sufficient resources to support adult frogs. Foam-nest building behaviors and patterns have evolved several times. The foam nest made by the female provides different functions for aquatic and terrestrial breeding alike. Some grey foam-nest tree frogs breed exclusively in water. In these water-breeders, foam nests allow the eggs to be suspended in oxygenated water. Grey foam-nest tree frogs that reproduce on land create these nests to minimize drying out, temperature changes, and predation.

Development occurs over a period of six days, with the mother ensuring the eggs stay moist the day after mating. Egg mortality in foam nesting tree frogs remains mostly unexplored, therefore information regarding the matter is limited. Grey foam-nest tree frogs' egg mortality is considered moderate compared to other anuran species. Following the embryonic development, a tadpole breaks free and drops into the water below the foam nest. Tadpoles live in the benthic zone (associated with or occurring on the bottom of a body of water). Maturity is achieved within six to eight weeks.

=== Interactions ===
Male grey foam-nest tree frogs typically do not fight with other males of their species. Currently, there is nothing known about kin recognition and larval sibling competition in this species.

Adaptations

These frogs often live in arid and semi-arid climates and have developed several adaptations to live months at a time away from water. These include uricotelism, rectal water reabsorption, skin resistant to desiccation, and skin that changes color in response to temperature. They have relatively impermeable skin, which allows them to survive dry spells under tree detritus. They are also able to lose up to sixty percent of their body weight over the course of several months.

The grey foam-nest tree frog forms uric acid and excretes it from their body as a nitrogenous end product. Anywhere between fifty and seventy-five percent of total waste nitrogen is converted into uric acid, while the remaining amount is expelled as urea in waste. This uric acid excreted can be released in a solid form and does not result in any net water loss for the frog. This is especially relevant for grey foam-nest tree frogs as they primarily inhabit dry environments, where minimizing water loss is highly important.

Individual frogs can change their color from chalky white to dark brown, with the brown coloration presenting in a geometric/bark pattern. These frogs change their skin colors in response to temperature differences in order to maintain body temperature and minimize evaporative water loss. When they adopt a darker coloration, their body temperature will warm more rapidly with the sun's radiation. It is common for frogs to do this when the air temperature is below 36 °C. White coloration helps them maintain a temperature below the ambient temperature by reflecting heat away. Their skin is resistant to evaporation that rivals terrestrial reptiles, earning them the nickname of "waterproof frogs", but this resistance is not present in their ventral skin. When met with a dry period, these frogs tuck their ventral areas under them so that only their resistant skin is exposed. They also secrete a water-resistant mucus to seal any small gaps when they aestivate. If disturbed and forced to move, they lose a significant amount of water and may not be able to survive the rest of the dry season.

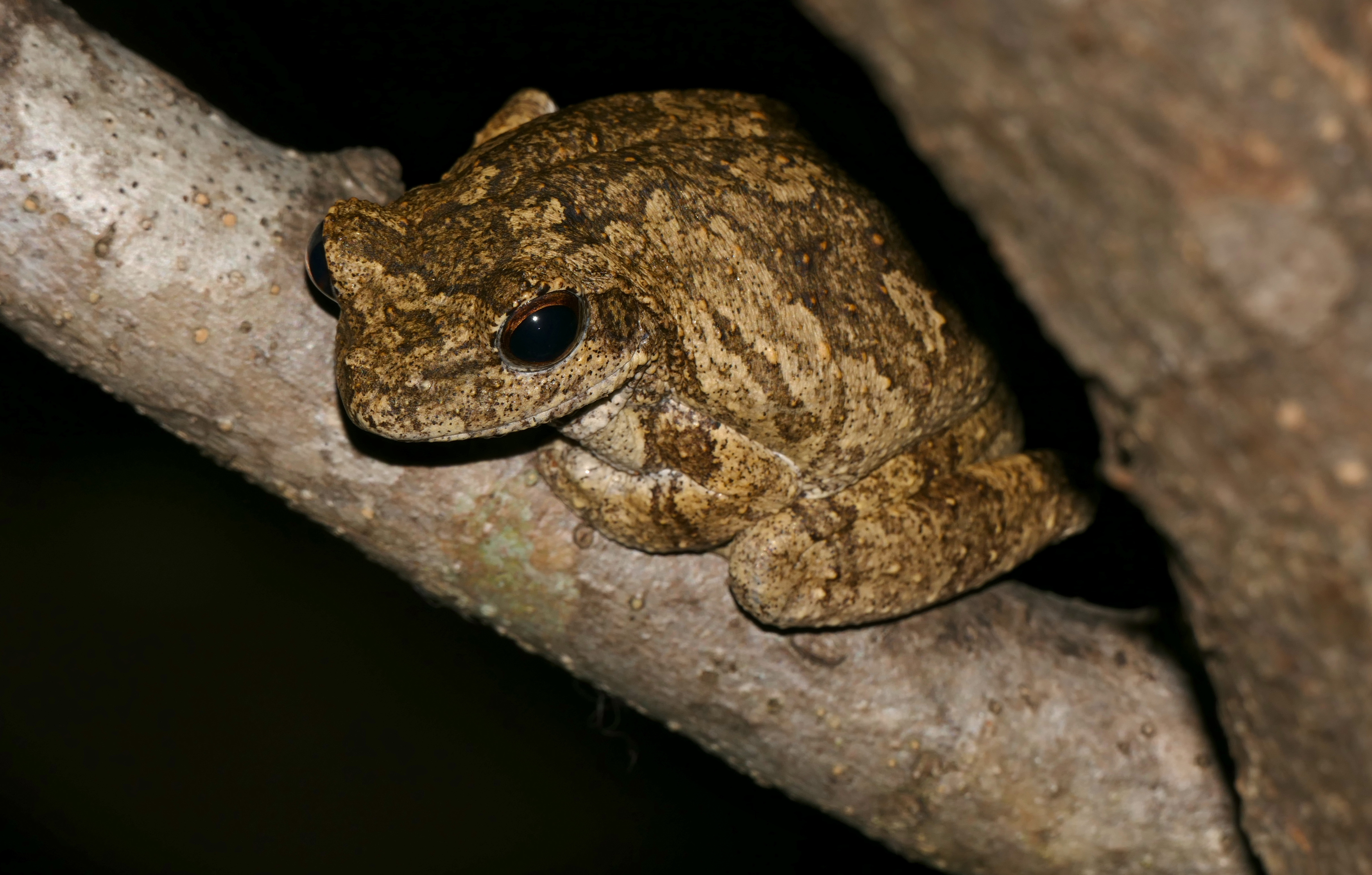
Color change of the grey foam-nest tree frog from chalky white to dark brown to adapt to temperature changes.

They are also able to lose up to sixty percent of their body weight over the course of several months. The grey foam-nest tree frog forms uric acid and excretes it from their body as a nitrogenous end product. Anywhere between fifty and seventy-five percent of total waste nitrogen is converted into uric acid, while the other twenty-five to fifty percent is expelled as urea in waste. This uric acid excreted can be released in a solid form and does not cause any water loss for the frog. This is especially suitable for grey foam-nest tree frogs due to the fact that they primarily inhabit dry environments, where minimizing water loss is highly important.

== Threats ==
It is known that adults of both sexes of Afrixalus fornasinii prey on grey foam-nest tree frog eggs and tadpoles. This species is the first African anuran to demonstrate hetero-cannibalism by preying on eggs belonging to the same family.

== See also ==
- Chiromantis petersii
- African foam-nest tree frog
- Chiromantis kelleri
