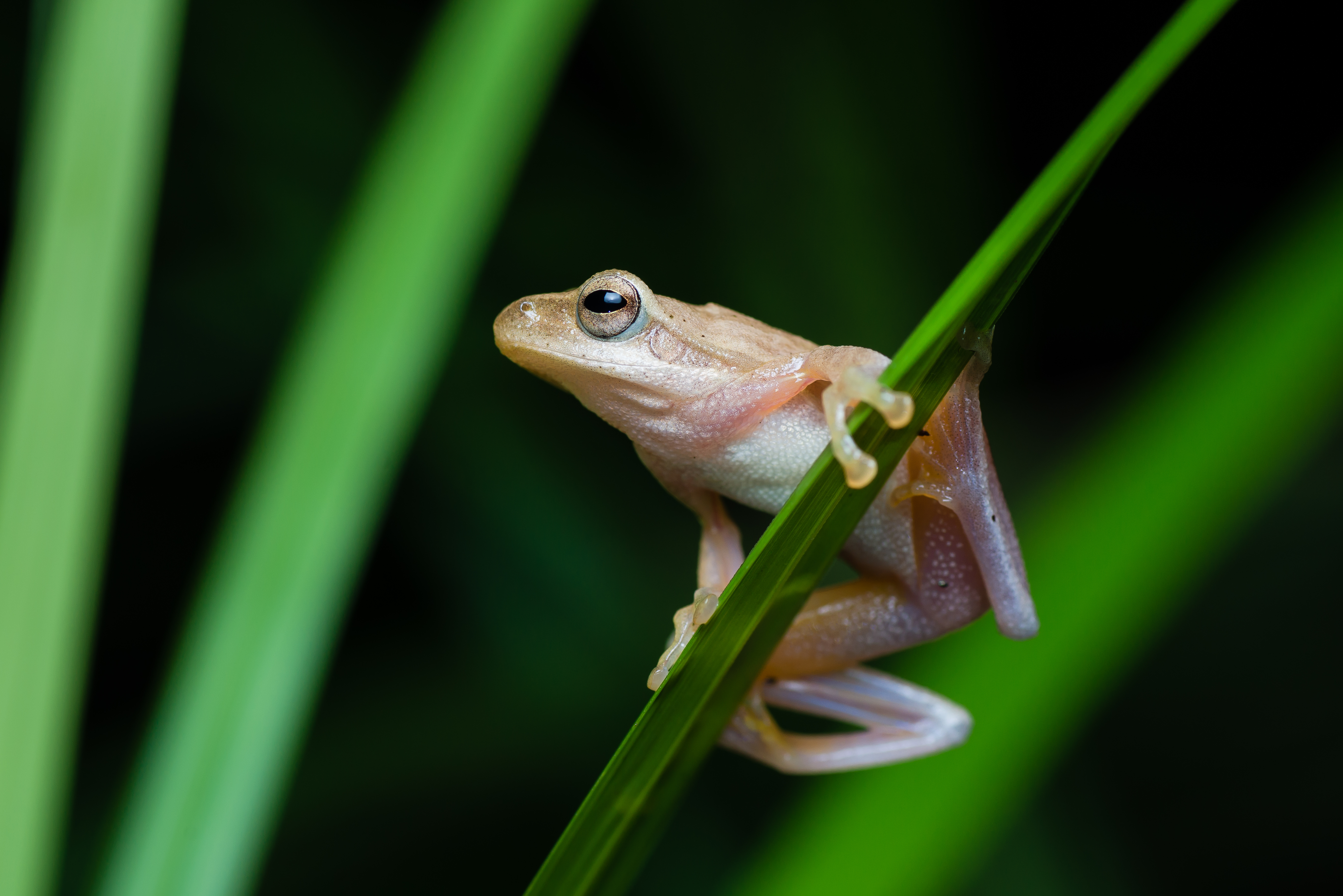
- At Phu Khiao Wildlife Sanctuary

Conservation status
- Least Concern (IUCN 3.1)

Scientific classification
- Kingdom: Animalia
- Phylum: Chordata
- Class: Amphibia
- Order: Anura
- Family: Rhacophoridae
- Genus: Chirixalus
- Species: C. doriae

Binomial name
- Chirixalus doriae Boulenger, 1893

Synonyms
- Philautus doriae (Boulenger, 1893); Rhacophorus doriae (Boulenger, 1893); Chiromantis doriae (Boulenger, 1893)

= Chirixalus doriae =

Species of amphibian

Chirixalus doriae, commonly known as Doria's Asian treefrog, Doria's bush frog, and Doria's tree frog, is a species of frog in the family Rhacophoridae. It is found in southeastern Asia, from extreme northeastern India (Arunachal Pradesh) and adjacent Bangladesh to Myanmar, Thailand, Cambodia, Laos, Vietnam, and southern China (Yunnan, Guangdong, and Hainan).

== Morphology ==
This is a small frog. The adult male measures 25–27 mm in snout-vent length and the adult female frog 29–34 mm. It has a pointed snout. The skin of the dorsum is bright yellow or brown in color with brown stripes. The backs of the legs are purple in color. Some individuals have black stripes on the purple parts of the legs. Parts of the neck are white in color. The undersides of the back legs are red in color. There are disks on the toes for climbing. This frog lives in trees.

== Reproduction ==
The female frog seeks a permanent body of water and lays her eggs in a foam nest on the undersides of leaves overhanging that water. This species breeds through larval development.

== Etymology ==
The specific name doriae honours Giacomo Doria, an Italian zoologist.

== Habitat and conservation ==
Its natural habitats are closed-canopy forests and grasslands, though it has also been observed in rice paddies and on plants near railroad tracks. This frog has been seen between 8 and 1630 meters above sea level.

The IUCN classifies this frog as least concern of extinction because of its large range. That range includes protected parks: Phou Louey National Biodiversity Conservation Area in Laos and Lawachara National Park in Bangladesh. However, deforestation in favor of agriculture, especially for cash crops such as coffee, rubber, and tea, poses some threat.
