= Doris Mable Cochran =

American herpetologist

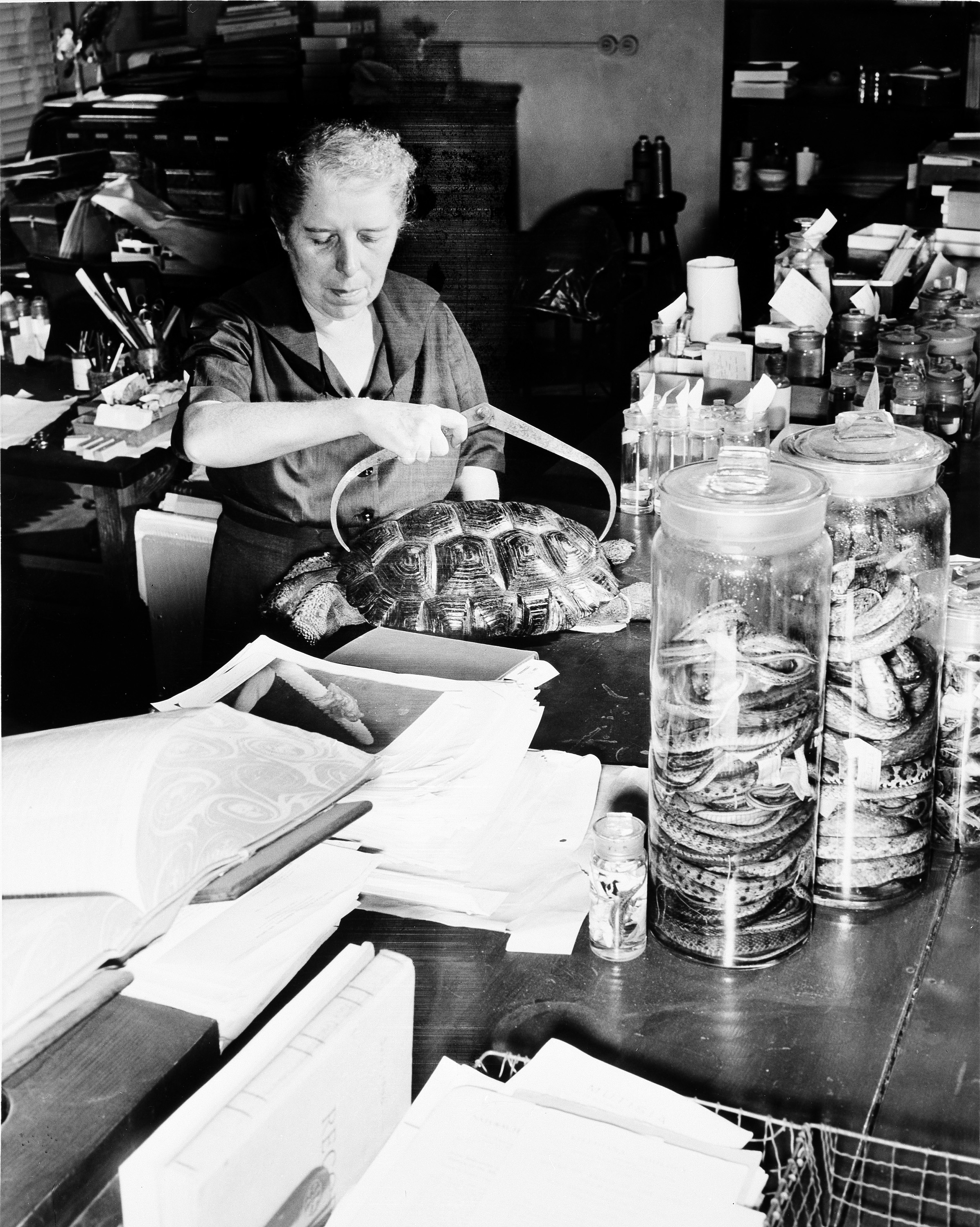
- Cochran measuring a turtle shell
- Born: May 18, 1898; North Girard, Pennsylvania, U.S.
- Died: May 22, 1968 (aged 70); Hyattsville, Maryland
- Education: George Washington University; University of Maryland, College Park; Corcoran Art School
- Known for: Study of reptiles, frogs
- Awards: Distinguished Fellow of the American Society of Ichthyologists and Herpetologists
- Scientific career
- Fields: Biology, herpetology
- Workplaces: United States Department of War, Smithsonian Institution
- Doctoral advisor: Leonhard Hess Stejneger

Doris Mable Cochran (May 18, 1898 – May 22, 1968) was an American herpetologist and custodian of the American Natural Collection at the Smithsonian Institution in Washington, D.C., for many years.

== Life ==
Born in North Girard, Pennsylvania, she grew up in Washington, D.C., after her father transferred there for a government job.

While an undergraduate student at George Washington University (A.B. 1920, M.S. 1921), she worked for the War Department and became Aide in the Division of Herpetology at the United States National Museum. Although the museum was under the curatorship of Leonhard Stejneger, Cochran was responsible for the administration of the herpetological collections. She graduated with her MA from Johns Hopkins University in 1928. In 1942, she went on to become Associate Curator just prior to Stejneger's death.

She earned a Ph.D. at the University of Maryland in 1933 with a thesis on blue crab musculature. She became the first woman Curator in 1956 until her retirement in 1968 on her 70th birthday.

After completing studies at Corcoran Art School and developing her talents as an artist, Cochran became a scientific illustrator not only for her own works, but for those of her colleagues.

Cochran's research was focused primarily on the herpetofauna of the West Indies and South America, particularly Haiti. She published 90 taxonomic papers between 1922 and her death (four days after her retirement in 1968) in which she described eight new genera and 125 species and subspecies as well as wartime booklets for the military identifying venomous reptiles. Her 20 years of studies of the West Indies culminated in The Herpetology of Hispaniola in 1941. She visited Haiti twice, in 1935 and 1962–1963. In Haiti she would work with Adolfo Lutz and his daughter, Bertha.

Her most popular book was Living Amphibians of the World, published in 1961. When she visited Brazil, Cochran received a donation of 3,000 Brazilian frogs from Adolfo Lutz, and wrote about South American frogs in Frogs of Southeastern Brazil in 1954 and Frogs of Colombia in 1970 (posthumously).

== Honors ==
Cochran was the second person to be elected a distinguished fellow of the American Society of Ichthyologists and Herpetologists in 1962 and had served as its first secretary. At least six reptiles have been named after Doris Cochran of which four are still considered valid: Aristelliger cochranae GRANT 1931, Gelanesaurus cochranae (BURT & BURT 1931), Sphaerodactylus cochranae RUIBAL 1946, Gongylosoma baliodeirus cochranae (TAYLOR 1962).

== Partial list of published works ==
- (1930). Cold-blooded vertebrates. (New York: Smithsonian Institution).
- (1934). Herpetological collections from the West Indies, made by Dr. Paul Bartsch under the Walter Rathbone Bacon scholarship, 1928-1930. (New York: Smithsonian Institution).
- (1935). The skeletal musculature of the blue crab, Callinectes sapidus Rathbun. (New York: Smithsonian Institution).
- (1941). The Herpetology of Hispaniola. (Washington, D.C.: United States Government Printing Office).
- (1954). Frogs of Southeastern Brazil. (Washington, D.C.: Smithsonian Institution).
- (1961). Living Amphibians of the World. (Garden City, N.Y.: Doubleday).
- (1961). Type specimens of reptiles and amphibians in the U.S. National Museum. (Washington, D.C.: Smithsonian Institution).
- (1970). Frogs of Colombia. (Washington, D.C.: Smithsonian Institution).
- (1970). (with Coleman J. Goin). The New Field Book of Reptiles and Amphibians; more than 200 photographs and diagrams. (New York: G.P. Putnam's Sons).
