= G.K. Noble =

American zoologist (1894–1940)

Gladwyn Kingsley Noble (September 20, 1894 – December 9, 1940) was an American zoologist who served as the head curator for the department of herpetology and the department of experimental biology at the American Museum of Natural History. Noble received bachelor's and master's degrees from Harvard University in 1917 and 1918, respectively, and a Ph.D. from Columbia University in 1922. He joined the herpetology department in 1922 as a research assistant and assistant curator in 1917, and became the chairman of the department in 1924. He later formed the Department of Experimental Biology in 1928, and served as the chairman of both departments until his death on December 9, 1940, from a streptococcal throat infection.

== Background ==
Noble's father was Gilbert Clifford Noble, one of the founders of what would become Barnes & Noble bookstores and publishing house. Gilbert Clifford Noble joined the Arthur Hinds & Company firm in 1886 after graduating from Harvard College. In 1894, he was made a partner and the name of the company was changed to Hinds & Noble. In 1917, Gilbert bought out Hinds and entered into a partnership with William Barnes and the company was changed to Barnes & Noble. In 1930, Gilbert sold his share of the company to John Wilcox Barnes.

G.K. Noble was elected to the American Philosophical Society in 1933. He is the taxon author of 20 new species of reptiles. A species of lizard, Anolis noblei, is named in his honor. Also, a subspecies of lizard, Sphaerodactylus darlingtoni noblei, is named in his honor.

== Family ==
Noble was married to writer Ruth Crosby. The couple had two sons, G. Kingsley Noble Jr. (1924-1994) and Alan Noble (1926-1992). Ruth Crosby Noble died on March 15, 1988, aged 91, at the Allendale (New Jersey) Nursing Home. She authored The Nature of the Beast, a book on animal behavior based on research by her husband. G. Kingsley Noble Jr., was an anthropologist; a native of Portola Valley, California, he died on July 20, 1994, aged 70, of a heart attack, leaving two sons.

== Publications ==
- G.K. Noble and G.C. Klingel (August 11, 1932), American Museum Novitates number 549: "The Reptiles of Great Inagua Island, British West Indies".

== Publications by his son ==
- G. Kingsley Noble, Jr. (1974), Ethnology: The Bolivian Aymara. HANS C. BUECHLER and JUDITH-MARIA BUECHLER. American Anthropologist, 76: 148–149. doi: 10.1525/aa.1974.76.1.02a00760
- G. Kingsley Noble, Jr. (1971), Man's Many Voices: Language in Its Cultural Context. ROBBINS BURLING. American Anthropologist, 73: 1378–1379. doi: 10.1525/aa.1971.73.6.02a00710
- G. Kingsley Noble, Jr. Proto-Arawakan and its descendants. Bloomington: Indiana University, 1965. Series: International journal of American linguistics, v. 31, no. 3, pt. 2. Indiana University Research Center in Anthropology, Folklore, and Linguistics, 38.
