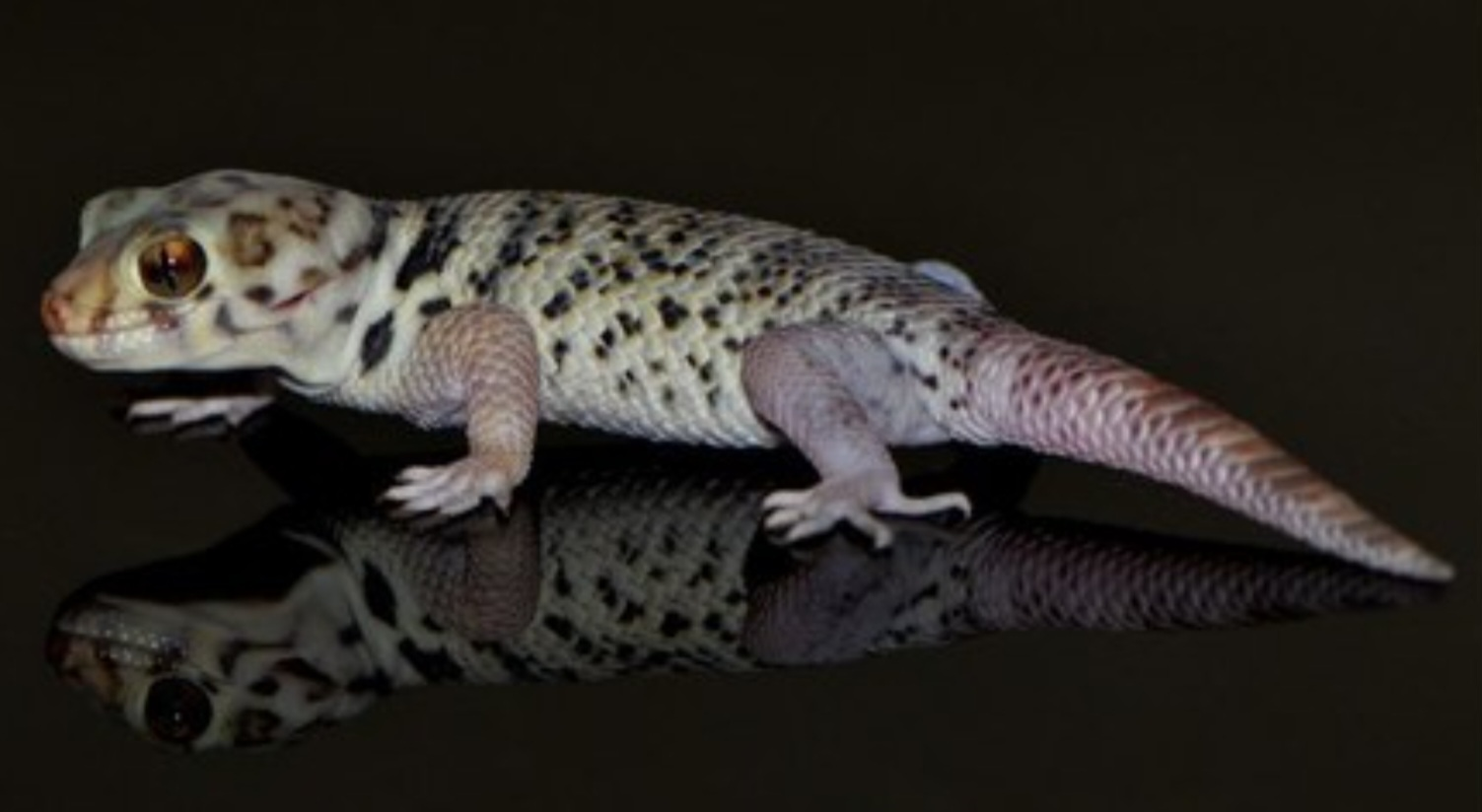

Conservation status
- Least Concern (IUCN 3.1)

Scientific classification
- Kingdom: Animalia
- Phylum: Chordata
- Class: Reptilia
- Order: Squamata
- Suborder: Gekkota
- Family: Sphaerodactylidae
- Genus: Teratoscincus
- Species: T. roborowskii

Binomial name
- Teratoscincus roborowskii Bedriaga, 1906

= Teratoscincus roborowskii =

Species of lizard

Teratoscincus roborowskii, commonly known as the Tibetan wonder gecko or Turpan wonder gecko, is a species of gecko in the family Sphaerodactylidae. The species is endemic to the Turpan Depression in Xinjiang, northwestern China, where it occurs in arid shrubland and desert habitats. It reaches a snout-vent length of 75.5–93.6 mm (3.0–3.7 in), and adult males tend to have wider heads than adult females.

This lizard is a nocturnal and ground-dwelling species, emerging from its burrow to forage at night. Its diet shifts seasonally, feeding mainly on insects in spring and fruit in summer and autumn. The fruit of the caper bush is an important food item in certain months, and the gecko is also a seed disperser for this plant. During the winter, this reptile hibernates in its burrow.

Juveniles of this species are known to curl their tails forwards when threatened, most likely to mimic venomous scorpions and avoid predation. They are also similar in size, color and running patterns to Mesobuthus scorpions, further supporting the idea that they exhibit Batesian mimicry.

== Taxonomy ==
This species was first described in 1906 by Jacques von Bedriaga, and the specific name, roborowskii, honors Russian explorer Vsevolod Ivanovich Roborovsky. It was formerly synonymized with Teratoscincus scincus and Teratoscincus przewalskii, but molecular and morphological analyses have supported its status as a distinct and valid species. Although the holotype (ZISP 9155) was originally reported to have been collected from the Oasis of Ssatschsheu (Dunhuang) in Gansu, China, this is believed to be an error as newer studies find that the species is absent there. This is likely due to mixing of museum labels while examining the specimen, and the holotype is probably from the Turpan Depression of Xinjiang, China. The species is commonly referred to as the Tibetan or Turpan wonder gecko in reference to its range.

== Distribution and habitat ==
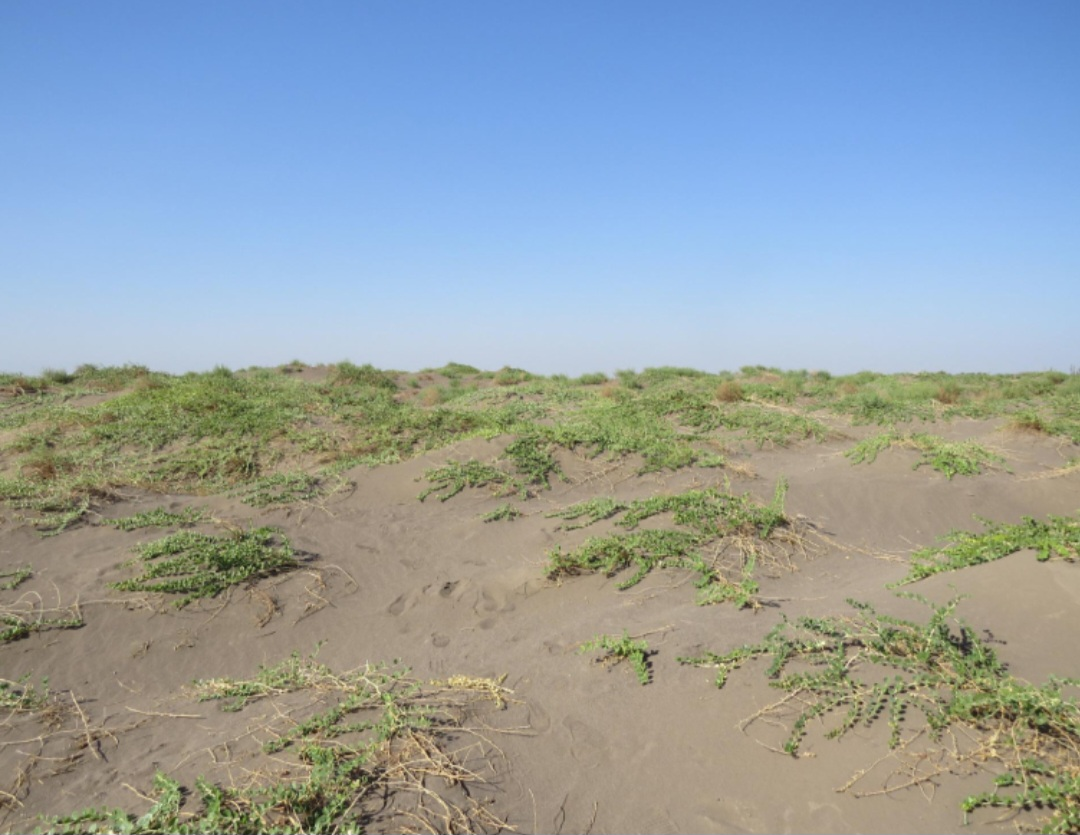
View of the desert environment in the Turpan Depression

The Turpan wonder gecko is endemic to the Turpan Depression in Xinjiang, China, where it occurs in sandy areas such as shrubland and deserts. Older records of it being found in Gansu are now believed to be erroneous. Its habitat is arid, with an average annual precipitation of 16.4 mm (0.65 in), and an annual evaporation of 3,000 mm (9.8 ft). It occurs at a wide range of elevations, being recorded from 100 m (330 ft) below to 470 m (1,540 ft) above sea level, and has an estimated extent of occurrence of 6811 km². Dead wood is an important microhabitat for the species, providing shelter, foraging and thermoregulation.

== Description ==
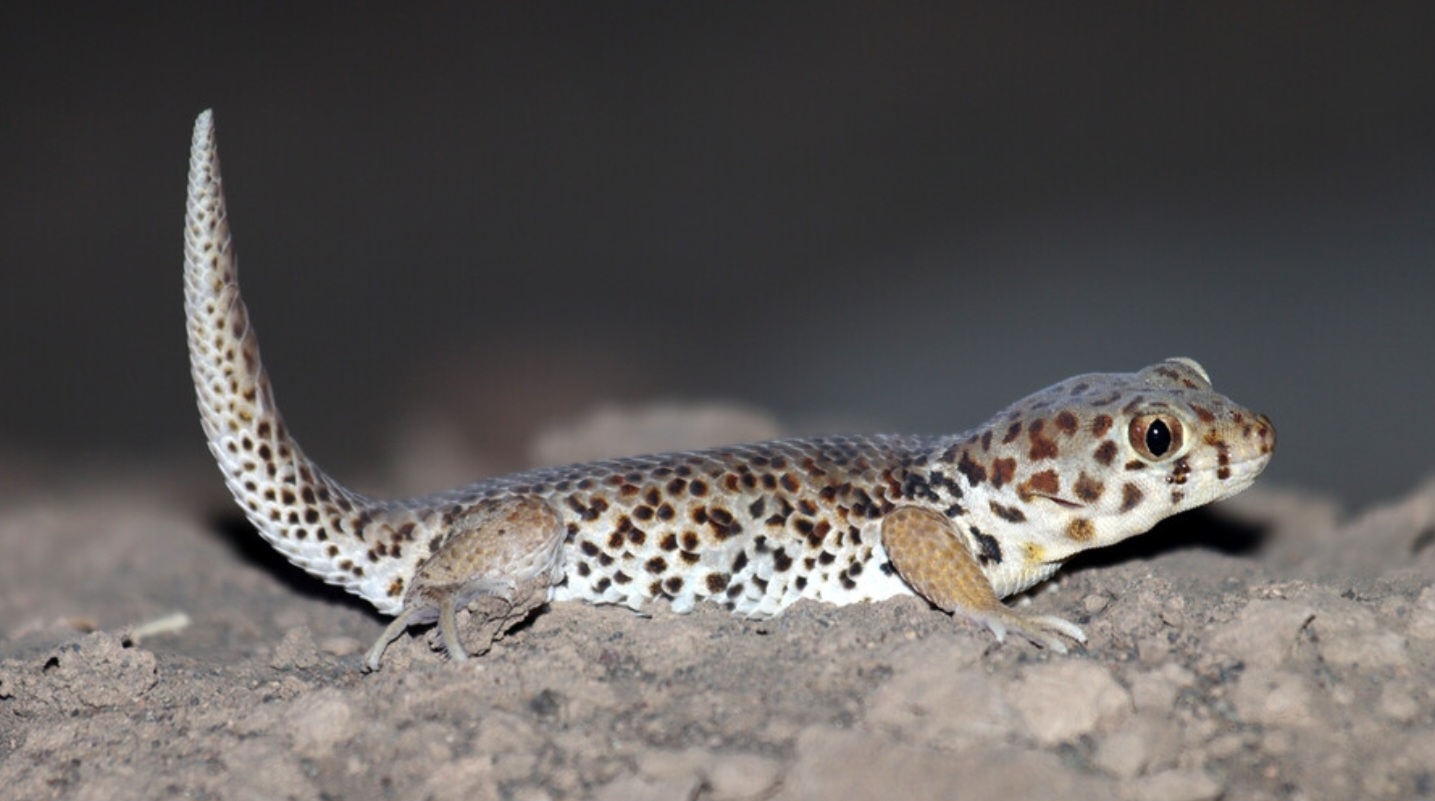
Wild individual near the Turpan Eremophyte Botanic Garden

A moderately sized lizard, the adults of this species reach a snout-vent length of 75.52–93.62 mm (2.973–3.686 in) and exhibit sexual dimorphism, with males having wider heads than females. On average, adult head width is 20.31 mm (0.800 in) in males and 19.77 mm (0.778 in) in females, though juveniles show no significant differences between sexes. This species has large eyes, while the snout and tail are short. The scales on the head are small, while those on the torso and tail are large and overlapping. The large cycloid scales on the back of the neck are arranged tapering from the forelimb level to the ear level, a feature distinguishing this species from the related common wonder gecko and Przewalski's wonder gecko. Adults have a largely orange background color with irregular dark spots on the upper surface, while the underside and flanks are lighter. Juveniles have thin dark crossbands on the upper surface that are lost with age. Five to eight of these bands may be present on the body and four to six may be on the tail, but most commonly there are seven and five bands on the body and tail respectively. This patterning may be mimicry of Mesobuthus scorpions, which have seven body plates and five tail segments.

== Behavior and ecology ==
This reptile is a nocturnal species, retreating to burrows during the day and emerging to feed at night. It is active in temperatures from 17–41 °C (63–106 °F) and hibernates in its burrow from October to late March. Though mostly solitary, male-female pairs have been seen emerging from the same burrows. It is a ground-dwelling species that forages mostly near or under vegetation, and may flee towards shrubs if disturbed on bare ground. The species is oviparous, and the females lay clutches of one or two eggs among shrubs.

=== Diet ===
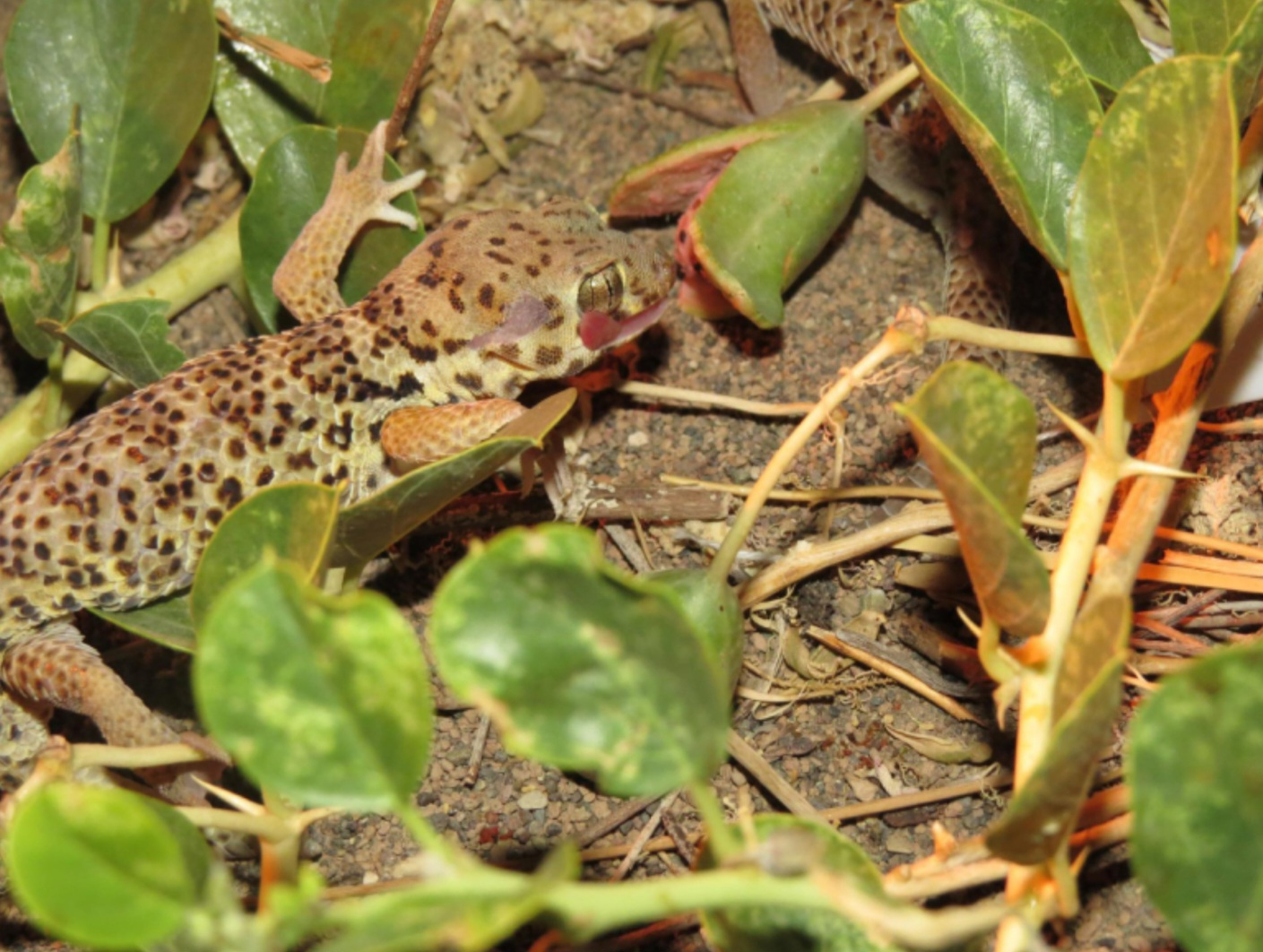
Individual eating a ripe caper fruit

This lizard is an omnivorous species with a varied diet. It is primarily carnivorous, with animal matter making up approximately 80% of its food intake, and feeds mostly on insects. Seasonal shifts have been recorded in its diet: from April to May it consumes mainly ants, darkling beetles and ground beetles, whereas from June to September plant fruits become a significant food item and darkling beetles are consumed less. This shift in diet seasonally alters the gut flora of the lizard, with lower microbiota diversity but more different phyla and families present in autumn than in spring. The fruit of the caper bush, which begins ripening in July, is reported to be its main plant food item and can comprise 85% of its diet in summer and autumn. This gecko has a mutualistic relationship with the caper bush as it is an effective disperser of the plant's seeds. Retention in the digestive system of the gecko is found to enhance the permeability of caper seed coats, which increases germination rate, breaks dormancy and enhances water uptake of the seeds. In addition, the lizard commonly excretes the seeds via defecation in areas suitable for germination.

=== Burrowing ===
This gecko is known to excavate and live in burrows, which generally are over 20 cm (7.9 in) deep and have up to four branches but only a single entrance. This depth provides stability in temperature above 0 °C (32 °F), preventing the animal from freezing during hibernation. Burrows less than 20 cm deep are simpler in structure, with a single unbranched tunnel, and most likely are temporary or unfinished burrows. The burrows of adults are wider and larger than those of juveniles, and are mostly within 20 m (66 ft) of the nearest vegetation, whereas burrows of juveniles tend to be closer to and within 5 m (16 ft) plants. Geckos of all ages produce burrows of similar depth.

=== Mortality and defence ===
Like other small reptiles, T. roborowskii is a prey item to various animals. Potential predators of this lizard include the little owl, red fox and Tartar sand boa. Juveniles may even fall victim to cannibalism, and several adults have been reported to have regurgitated juveniles in a sack, presumably after the predation had occurred within said sack.

The gecko is known to employ various defensive and escape behaviors across different stages of its life to evade predation. It is known to autotomize its tail in defence, and individuals with regenerated tails can be observed. When threatened, adults are reported to take an arched posture while waving their tails from side to side, the tail scales making a hissing sound (presumably to intimidate predators). Juveniles may stiffen their bodies and curl their tails forward in a scorpion-like pose when provoked, which is believed to be Batesian mimicry of Mesobuthus scorpions. In addition, the juveniles are similar in size, coloration and escape behavior to these scorpions, making it difficult to distinguish between the two during their moonlit foraging hours, further supporting this theory. When fleeing, the adult lizard tends to run in a zigzag pattern and for longer distances than the juvenile, which generally runs a short distance in a straight line similar to the Mesobuthus scorpions. By mimicking the venomous scorpion, the comparatively harmless juvenile gecko may be able to deter predators from attacking it. Individuals of all ages may retreat to their burrows or hide under foliage when pursued.

== Conservation ==
The IUCN assessed this lizard as Least Concern in 2018, due to the lack of identified major threats and evidence of decline. It is known to be collected for the pet trade, but the impacts of this are unclear. Although the species has a limited distribution, it is locally common and has an apparently large population. Autumn and Han (1989) reported that the gecko was so abundant in one site, they "often observed over 40 eyeshines at a single spot" when turning a full circle while holding a flashlight.
