= Golos =

Golos (Голос), a word for "voice" in various Slavic languages, may refer to:

== Periodicals ==
- Golos (newspaper), a Russian newspaper, published in Saint Petersburg in 1863-1885
- Golos Prikazchika, a former weekly newspaper published in St. Petersburg
- Golos Respubliki, a Kazakhstani newspaper
- Golos Sotsial-Demokrata, a former Russian-language publication, issued by a section of exiled Mensheviks
- Golos Truda, an anarcho-syndicalist periodical published in New York, St. Petersburg and Moscow in the 1910s and 1920s

== Film and television ==
- Golos (film), a Russian 1982 psychological drama
- Golos (TV series), Russian music talent television show, part of the international Voice franchise

== Other ==
- Golos (election monitor), a coalition of non-governmental groups monitoring for election violations and government responsiveness to citizen requests in Russia
- Jacob Golos (1889–1943), Ukrainian-born Bolshevik revolutionary and Soviet secret police operative in the USSR, founder of Golos spy ring with Gaik Ovakimian as head in U.S.
- Holos (political party), sometimes romanized as Golos, a pro-European political party in Ukraine
