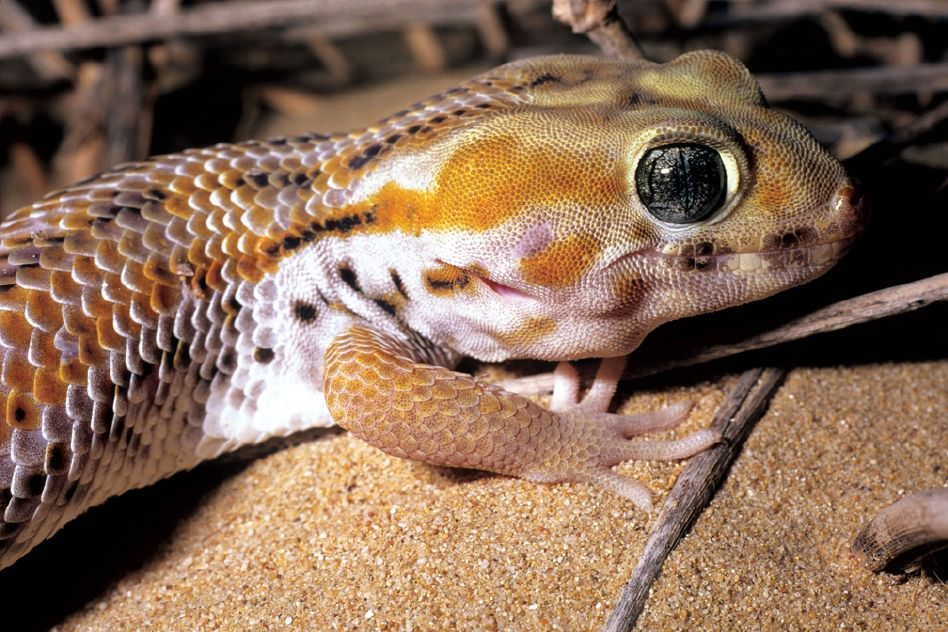
- Persian wonder gecko (Teratoscincus keyserlingii)

Scientific classification
- Kingdom: Animalia
- Phylum: Chordata
- Class: Reptilia
- Order: Squamata
- Suborder: Gekkota
- Family: Sphaerodactylidae
- Genus: Teratoscincus; Strauch, 1863

= Teratoscincus =

Genus of lizards

Teratoscincus is a genus of geckos commonly referred to as wonder geckos or frog-eyed geckos; it is the only genus within the subfamily Teratoscincinae of the family Sphaerodactylidae. Species in the genus Teratoscincus are found from the Arabian Peninsula in Qatar, the United Arab Emirates, and Oman, west across southern Asia in Iran, Afghanistan, and Pakistan, north to Russia, Kazakhstan, Turkmenistan, Uzbekistan, and Tajikistan to Mongolia and China. The genus consists of nine species.

== Member species ==
The genus Teratoscincus contains the following nine species which are recognized as being valid.

- Teratoscincus bedriagai Nikolsky, 1900 – Bedriaga's wonder gecko, Bedriaga's plate-tailed gecko
- Teratoscincus keyserlingii Strauch, 1863 – Persian wonder gecko
- Teratoscincus mesriensis Nazarov, Radjabizadeh, Poyarkov, Ananjeva, Melnikov & Rastegar-Pouyani, 2017
- Teratoscincus microlepis Nikolsky, 1900 – small-scaled wonder gecko
- Teratoscincus przewalskii Strauch, 1887 – Przewalski's wonder gecko
- Teratoscincus roborowskii Bedriaga, 1906
- Teratoscincus rustamowi Szczerbak, 1979
- Teratoscincus scincus (Schlegel, 1858) – common wonder gecko, frog-eyed gecko
- Teratoscincus sistanense Akbarpour, Shafiei, Sehhatisabet & Damadi, 2017

Nota bene: A binomial authority in parentheses indicates that the species was originally described in a genus other than Teratoscincus.

== In captivity ==
T. roborowskii is frequently found in the exotic animal trade. It is suitable for keeping in a desert vivarium.
