= Mikhail Pyltsov =

- Михаил Александрович Пыльцов
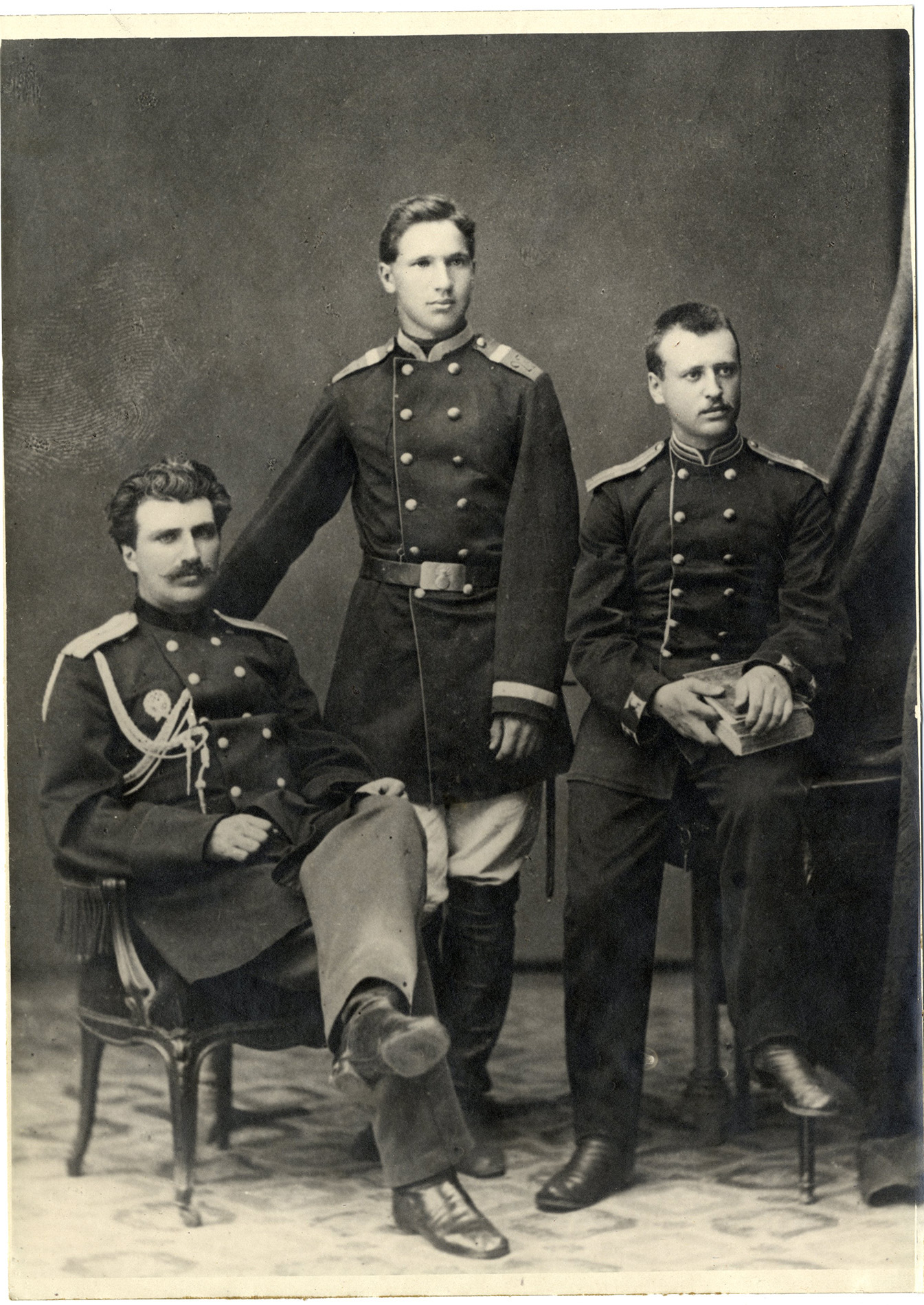
- Mikhail Pyltsov with N.M. Przhevalsky (Captain), N.Ya.Yagunov (Lieutenant)
- Born: 1846
- Died: 1898 (aged 51–52)
- Spouse: Alexandra Ivanovna Tolpygo (m. 1874)

Mikhail Alexandrovich Pyltsov (1846 – 1898) was a Russian army officer and explorer who travelled in central Asia along with N.M. Przewalski and collected numerous specimens.

Pyltsov went to the Warsaw infantry cadet school where he was taught by N.M. Przewalski. He graduated in 1864 and joined for his first expedition into central Asia in 1870. A colleague, Nikolai Yagunov drowned in the Vistula river. Pyltsov married Przewalski's half-sister Alexandra Ivanovna Tolpygo in 1874.

Several species have been named after Pyltzov including Urocynchramus pylzowi and Podarces pylzowi.
