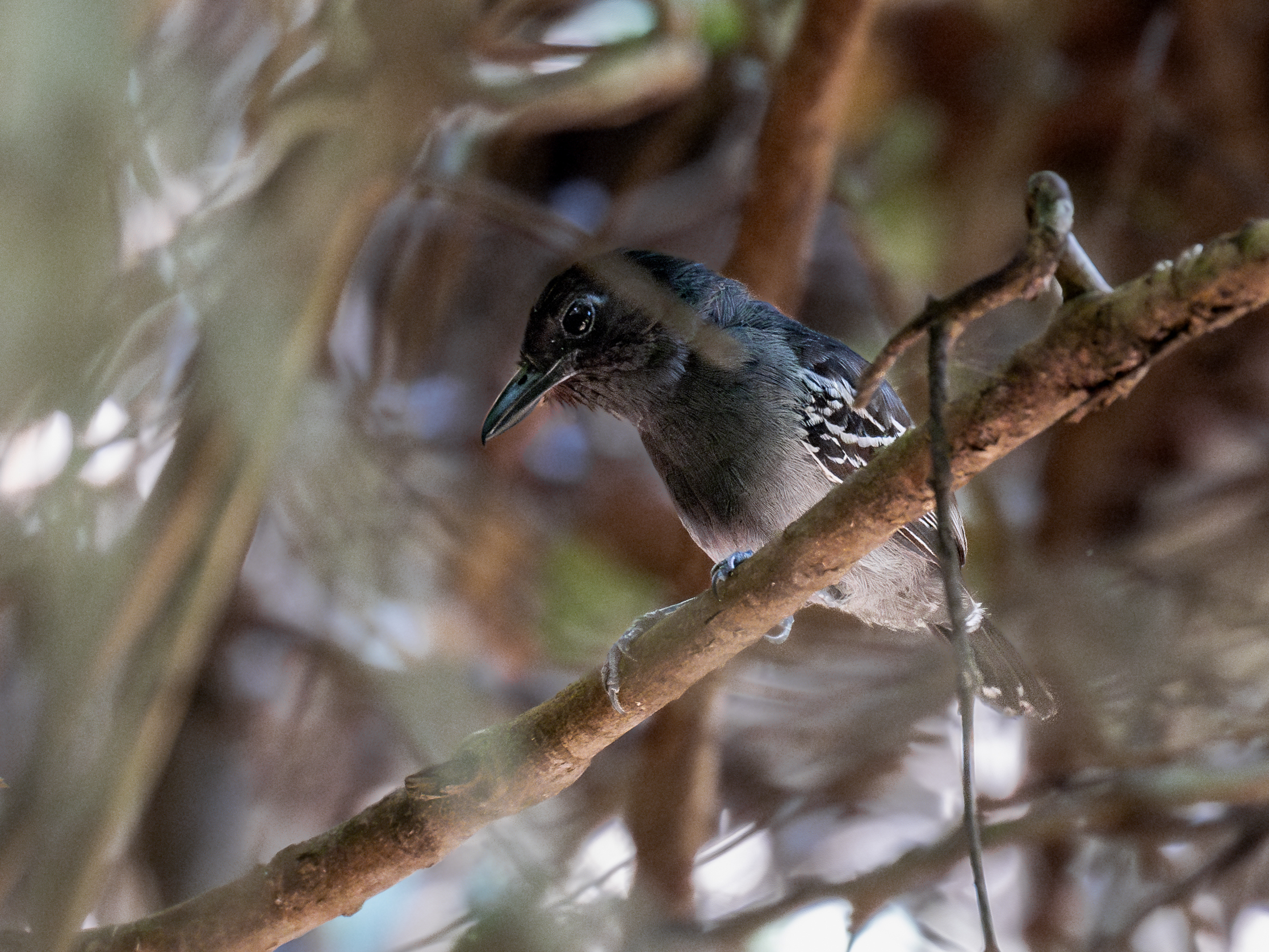
- Male
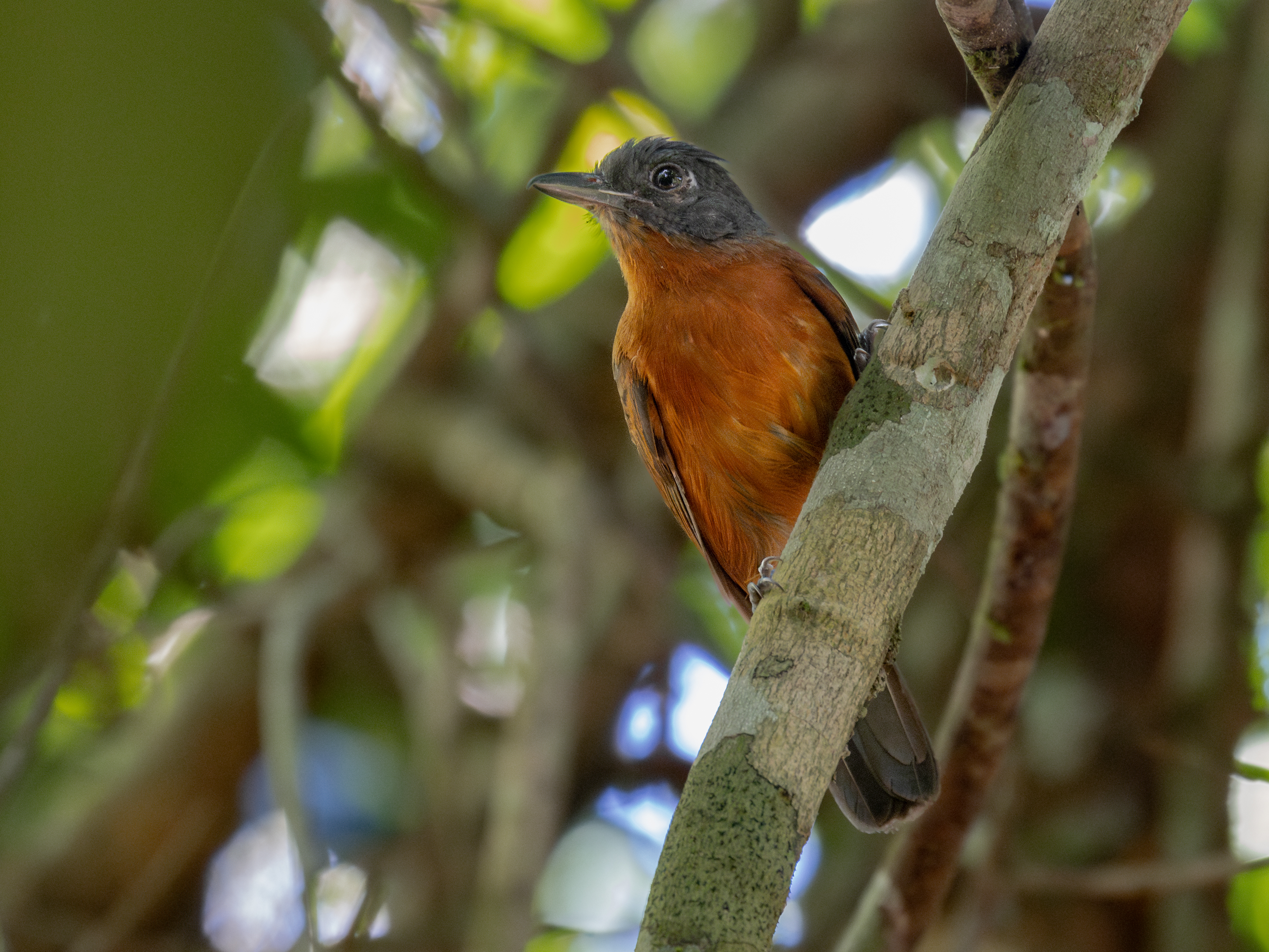
- Female at a Tapajós River island, Itaituba, Pará, Brazil

Conservation status
- Least Concern (IUCN 3.1)

Scientific classification
- Kingdom: Animalia
- Phylum: Chordata
- Class: Aves
- Order: Passeriformes
- Family: Thamnophilidae
- Genus: Thamnophilus
- Species: T. nigrocinereus

Binomial name
- Thamnophilus nigrocinereus Sclater, PL, 1855

= Blackish-grey antshrike =

Species of bird

The blackish-grey antshrike (Thamnophilus nigrocinereus) is a species of bird in subfamily Thamnophilinae of family Thamnophilidae, the "typical antbirds". It is found in Brazil, Colombia, French Guiana and Venezuela.

== Taxonomy and systematics ==
The blackish-grey antshrike was described by the English zoologist Philip Sclater in 1855 and given the binomial name Thamnophilus nigrocinereus. It has these five subspecies:

- T. n. cinereoniger Pelzeln, 1868
- T. n. kulczynskii (Domaniewski & Stolzmann, 1922)
- T. n. nigrocinereus Sclater, PL, 1855
- T. n. tschudii Pelzeln, 1868
- T. n. huberi Snethlage, E, 1907

Some authors treated Castelnau's antshrike (T. cryptoleucus) as a subspecies of the blackish-grey antshrike, but that approach was not widely accepted. They are now considered sister species. Some authors suggest that some of the current subspecies might be better treated as species.

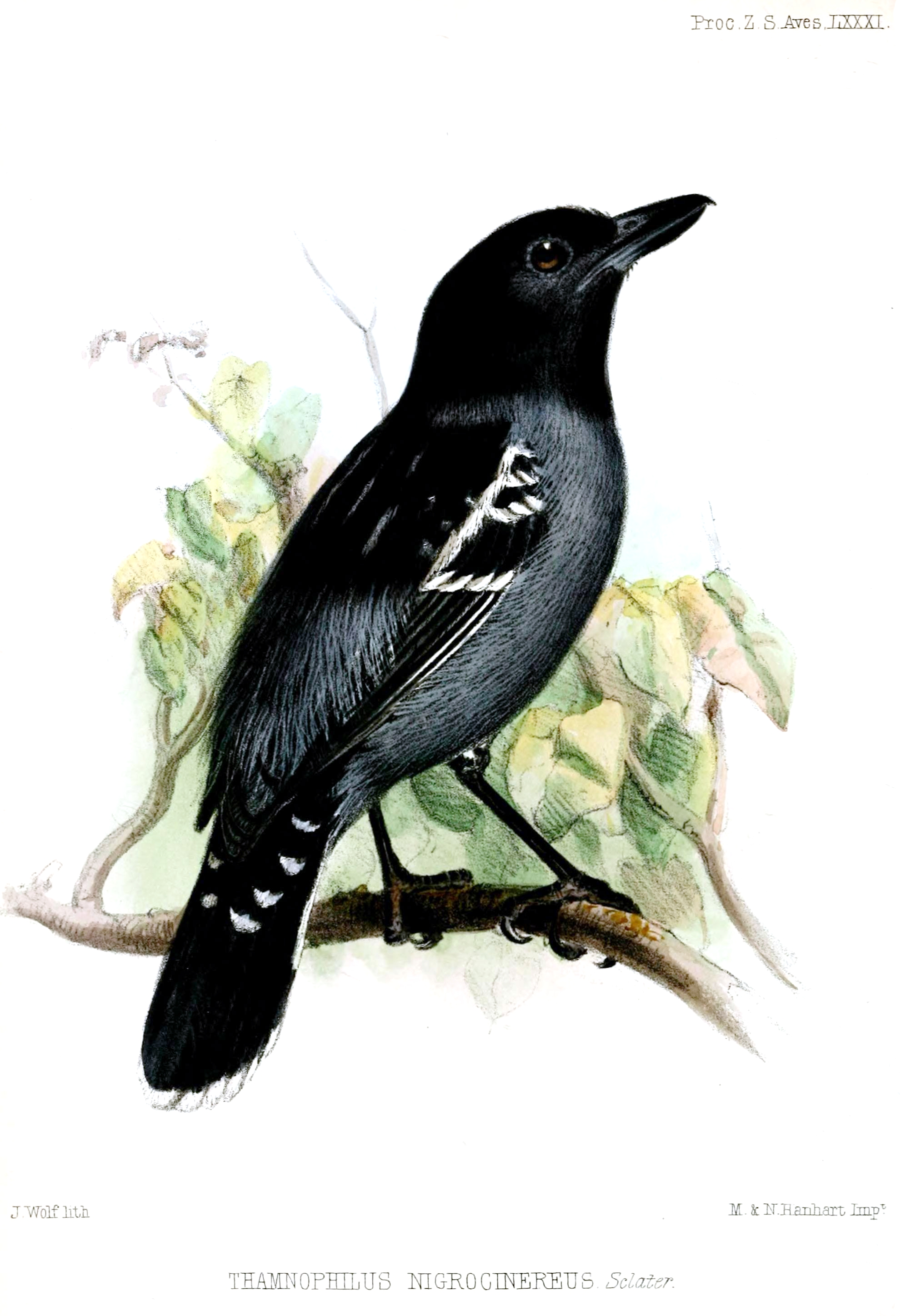
A male illustrated by Wolf, 1855

== Description ==
The blackish-grey antshrike is 15 to 17 cm (5.9 to 6.7 in) long and weighs 28 to 32 g (0.99 to 1.1 oz). Members of genus Thamnophilus are largish members of the antbird family; all have stout bills with a hook like those of true shrikes. This species exhibits sexual dimorphism. Adult males of the nominate subspecies T. n. nigrocinereus are generally blackish gray. Their crown is black; their back is lighter than their crown, darker than their rump, and has a hidden white patch between their scapulars. Their wings have a brownish tinge. Their scapulars, wing coverts, and flight feathers have white edges and their tail feathers have white tips. Their rump and belly are lighter than their back. Adult females have a blackish gray crown and face. Their upperparts are dark gray with a reddish brown tinge, their wings and tail are brown, and their underparts are a reddish brown that is darkest across their breast.

The other subspecies of the blackish-grey antshrike differ from the nominate and each other thus:

- T. n. cinereoniger: males paler overall than the nominate with a slaty gray back with black mixed in and white tips on their crissum feathers; females have dark rufous-brown upperparts and orange-rufous underparts
- T. n. kulczynskii: males like the nominate; females have a blackish head, olive-brown upperparts, and a grayish belly and crissum
- T. n. tschudii: males have black upperparts and blackish underparts; females have chestnut-brown upperparts and a sooty brownish black throat
- T. n. huberi: males are overall grayer than the nominate (except their crown) and have white tips on their crissum feathers; females have a rufous-brown back and tail and cinnamon-rufous underparts

== Distribution and habitat ==
The blackish-grey antshrike is a bird of the northern Amazon Basin. The subspecies are found thus:

- T. n. cinereoniger: Meta River drainage in east-central Colombia, upper Orinoco River and its tributary Caura River in southwestern Venezuela, and the Negro River and its tributary the Vaupés River in northwestern Brazil
- T. n. kulczynskii: eastern French Guiana and adjoining extreme northern Amapá state in Brazil
- T. n. nigrocinereus: eastern Brazil from lower Tapajós River east along the Amazon and its tributaries to the Amazon Delta in Amapá
- T. n. tschudii: lower Madeira River drainage in eastern Amazonas state of west-central Brazil
- T. n. huberi: lower Tapajós River in western Pará state of east-central Brazil

The blackish-grey antshrike inhabits a variety of landscapes, most of which are forested and closely tied to rivers. In all habitats it favors the understorey to mid-storey. In Colombia and Venezuela it mostly occurs in seasonally flooded savanna woodland on white-sand soils and in gallery forest. In coastal French Guiana it occurs in mangroves and further inland along river edges. In the Brazilian Amazon basin it occurs on river islands and riverside "mainland" várzea and igapó forest and also around the edges of clearings near rivers. On larger island in the Amazon Delta it occurs on higher ground that is surrounded by seasonally flooded lower areas. In elevation it occurs below 400 m (1,300 ft) in Colombia, to 200 m (700 ft) in Venezuela, and to 350 m (1,100 ft) in Brazil.

== Behavior ==
=== Movement ===
The blackish-grey antshrike is presumed to be a year-round resident throughout its range.

=== Feeding ===
The blackish-grey antshrike feeds on insects and other arthropods. It usually forages singly or in pairs and seldom joins mixed-species feeding flocks. The best-known subspecies, T. n. cinereoniger, usually forages within 0.3 m (1 ft) of the ground but does feed as high as 3 m (10 ft). It forages while hopping among branches and with short flights, commonly reaching or making short jumps from a perch. It often drops onto prey on the ground. Subspecies T. n. kulczynskii more often forages between 3 and 10 m (10 and 33 ft) in mangroves. In Brazilian Amazonia the species forages up into the forest's mid-storey.

=== Breeding ===
Little is known about the blackish-grey antshrike's breeding biology. Its breeding season includes March in the Orinoco River basin. The only documented nests were in French Guiana. They were deep cups woven of fibers from vines and other vegetation and bound with spider silk. Both sexes built the nests. They were suspended in branch forks, usually gray mangrove Laguncularia racemosa. The clutch size was two eggs. The incubation period, time to fledging, and details of parental care are not known because all of the nests were predated.

=== Vocalization ===
The blackish-grey antshrike's song differs somewhat among the subspecies. That of the nominate T. n. nigrocinereus is "a strongly accelerating, slowly delivered...series of low-pitched, mellow, punchy notes" that slightly descend. It is also described as a "series of about 10 low, descending, hooted notes". That of T. n. cinereoniger is "a low, nasal, hollow keeook..keok, keok-ku-ku-ku 'ku 'ku" that accelerates and stays even or slightly descends in pitch. The calls of cinereoniger include "a low, complaining caw and churring growl, ur-r-r-r-r-r-r".

== Status ==
The IUCN originally in 2004 assessed the blackish-grey antshrike as being of Least Concern, then in 2012 uplisted it to Near Threatened, and in 2023 returned it to of Least Concern. It has a large range; its population size is not known and is believed to be decreasing. "The primary threat to this species is accelerating deforestation in its range for agricultural purposes, livestock ranching and selective logging. It is thought likely to be particularly susceptible to fragmentation and edge effects." It is considered common in Colombia and locally fairly common in Venezuela and Brazil. It occurs in several protected areas including indigenous reserved zones. "Some Amazonian forms appear to tolerate the proximity of humans and inhabit shrubbery surrounding clearings on river islands."
