= Elizabeth Kozlova =

Russian ornithologist

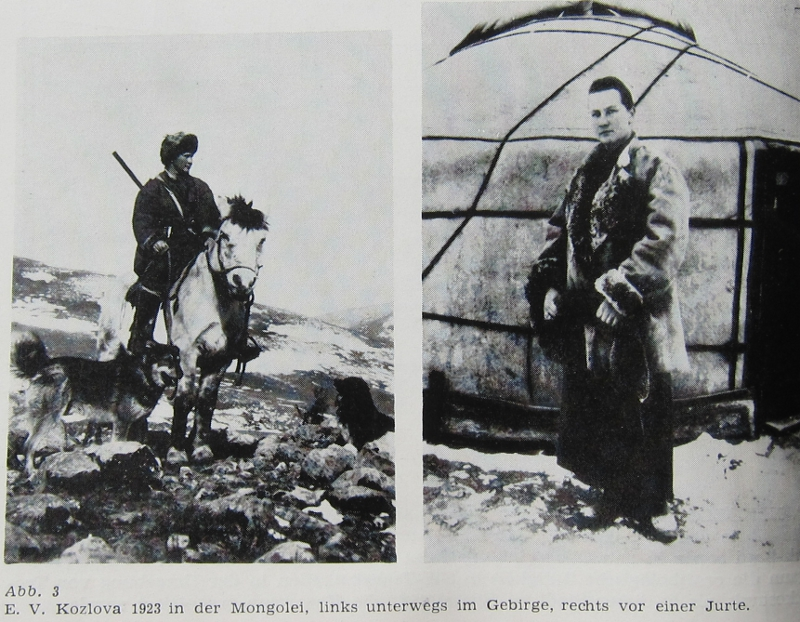
- Kozlova in 1923 in Mongolia
- Born: 19 August 1892; Krasnoye Selo, Russia
- Died: 10 February 1975 (aged 82)
- Occupation: Ornithologist
- Spouse: Pyotr Kozlov

Elizabeth Vladimirovna Kozlova née Pushkariova (19 August 1892 – 10 February 1975) was a Russian ornithologist who worked on the avifauna of the Tibetan plateau.

== Life and career ==
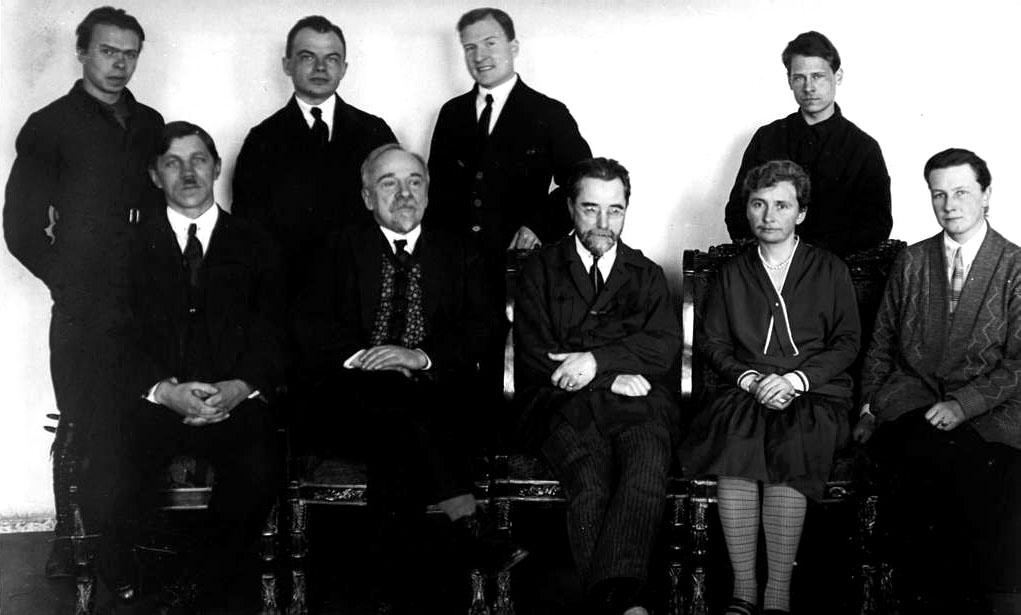
Kozlova (seated rightmost) with other Soviet ornithologists, 1924

Elizabeth was the daughter of Saint Petersburg physician Vladimir Pushkariov born in Krasnoye Selo. In 1910, at the age of 18, she was in Normandy where she impressed the famous Colonel Pyotr Kozlov, a well-known explorer 29 years her senior. A fan of the explorer Nikolai Przhevalsky, he was smitten by the explorer in her and he divorced his wife Nadezhda Stepanovna Kamynina (married 1891) and married Elizabeth in 1912. The couple lived in Smolny Prospect 6 and began to travel widely together. From 1923–1926 she took part as the professional ornithologist in an expedition, organised by the Russian Geographical Society and led by her husband, to Mongolia. She returned to Mongolia in 1929 and 1930 to collect and to conduct further bird studies, her research resulting in the publication in 1930 of Birds of South-western Transbaikalia, Northern Mongolia and the Central Gobi, for which she was awarded the Geographical Society's Silver Medal.

Kozlova was based at the Department of Ornithology in the Zoological Institute of the Russian Academy of Sciences in Saint Petersburg (then Leningrad) from 1932 to 1975. During the Second World War, the institute was moved to Dushanbe, Tajikistan. During this period Kozlova studied mountain birds including the biology of Phasianus colchicus bianchii. After returning to Leningrad to 1945, she no longer went on field expeditions. She then produced the monographs Avifauna of the Tibetan Plateau, its Genetic Relationships and History in 1952, and The Birds of Zonal Steppes and Deserts of Central Asia in 1975. She also published many papers on avian taxonomy and phylogeny as well as writing extensive sections of The Birds of the USSR (1951–1953) and the series Fauna of the USSR. The Great Grey Owl (Strix nebulosa elisabethae) and the Ortolan bunting (Emberiza hortulana elisabethae) are named after her.
