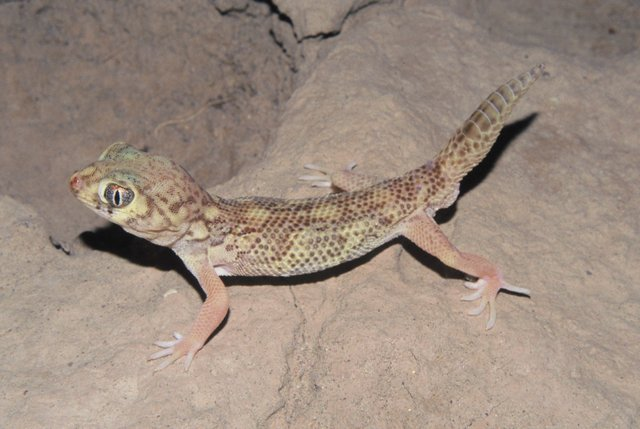

Conservation status
- Least Concern (IUCN 3.1)

Scientific classification
- Kingdom: Animalia
- Phylum: Chordata
- Class: Reptilia
- Order: Squamata
- Suborder: Gekkota
- Family: Sphaerodactylidae
- Genus: Teratoscincus
- Species: T. bedriagai

Binomial name
- Teratoscincus bedriagai Nikolsky, 1900

= Teratoscincus bedriagai =

Species of lizard

Teratoscincus bedriagai, also known commonly as Bedriaga's wonder gecko or Bedriaga's plate-tailed gecko, is a small species of lizard in the family Sphaerodactylidae. The species is native to Central and Western Asia.

== Etymology ==
The specific name, bedriagai, is in honor of Russian herpetologist Jacques von Bedriaga.

== Geographic range ==
T. bedriagai is native to the northern and eastern desert basins of the central Plateau of Iran, Sistan, and the desert regions of southern Afghanistan as far east as Kandahar. Ecological variables tested for T. bedriagai found that isothermality was more important with 32% contribution.

== Habitat ==
The preferred natural habitats of T. bedriagai are desert and shrubland, at altitudes of 100–1,400 m (330–4,590 ft).

== Reproduction ==
T. bedriagai is oviparous.
