= Vsevolod Roborovsky =

Russian army officer and explorer

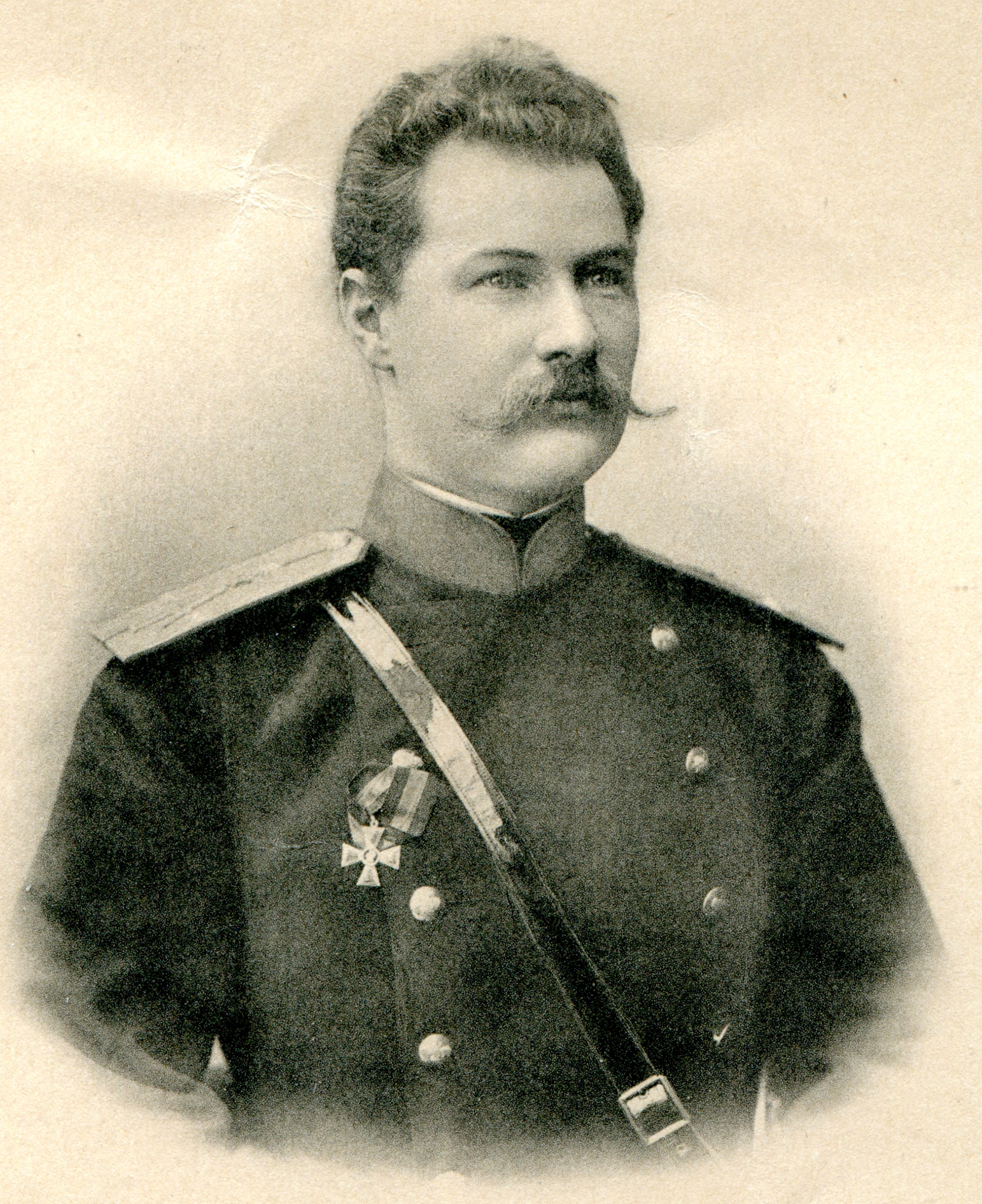

Vsevolod Ivanovich Roborovsky (26 April 1856 – 23 July 1910) was a Russian army officer, explorer, artist, and natural history collector in central Asia. Many species were described on the basis of the specimens he collected and several are named after him, including Phodopus roborowskii, Carpodacus roborowskii, Adiantum roborowskii, and Cacalia roborowskii.

== Biography ==
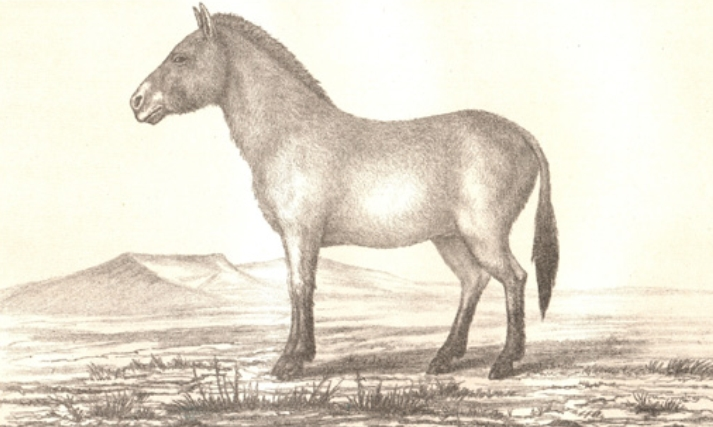
Sketch of Przewalski's horse by Roborovsky

Roborovsky was born in St Petersburg to a father who came from nobility, but little is known about his mother. The family owned a farm in the village of Taraki in Tver province north of Moscow. He had two older sisters. His paternal grandfather Ivan Mikhailovich was an Orthodox clergyman. He studied at the Vilensky classical gymnasium and joined the 145 Novocherkassk infantry regiment in 1876, becoming a non-commissioned officer in 1877, trained in Helsinki and then became an ensign in 1878.

He met Fyodor Eklon, who had served in Przewalski's Lopnor expedition (1876–1877), and through him sought to join on the next expedition. In 1879 he was chosen by Przewalski to join on the First Tibet expedition. He was taught to prepare herbarium specimens and he finally collected nearly 12,000 specimens of 1500 species. He also prepared illustrations for the expedition. He returned in 1881 from the first expedition and promoted to the rank of second lieutenant. On the second expedition, he was in charge of photography and assisted Przewalski and Pyotr Kozlov in collecting birds and insects. He was injured on this expedition and had to be carried in a cart, with the expedition ending in November 1885. He was promoted to lieutenant on return and awarded the Order of Saint Vladimir of the 4th degree. He failed to enter the officers academy, and on the next expedition in which Przewalski died, Roborovski took over command. However, he refused to lead any future inner Asia expeditions and served under M.V. Pevtsov in 1889–91. In 1893 he studied botany under K. Maksimovich and was engaged to Lydia Osipova, daughter of Alexander Lapin, gardener at the Saint Petersburg Botanical Garden. He went on another expedition and suffered from a paralytic stroke in 1895, forcing an early return. He finally returned to St Petersburg in 1896 and married Osipova. He received the Konstantin Gold Medal in 1897. He spent his final years in Taraki and died from a stroke. He was buried in Ovsische near the Chapel of Michael the Archangel.
