= Pyotr Kozlov =

Russian explorer (1863–1935)

- Пётр Кузьми́ч Козло́в
- Pyotr Kozlov, c. 1890s
- Born: Pyotr Kuzmich Kozlov; 3 October 1863; Dukhovshchina, Smolensk Governorate, Russian Empire
- Died: 26 September 1935 (aged 71); Peterhof, Leningrad, Soviet Union
- Occupation: Explorer
- Spouse: Elizabeth Kozlova

Pyotr Kuzmich Kozlov (Russian: Пётр Кузьми́ч Козло́в; 3 October 1863 in Dukhovshchina – 26 September 1935 in Peterhof) was a Russian and Soviet traveller and explorer who continued the studies of Nikolai Przhevalsky in Mongolia and Tibet.

== Biography ==
Although prepared by his parents for a military career, Kozlov chose to join Nikolai Przhevalsky's expedition. After his mentor's death, Kozlov continued traveling in Asia with Przhevalsky's successors, Pevtsov and Roborovsky. In 1895 he took general command of the expedition from ailing Roborovsky. From 1899 to 1901 he explored and later described in a book the upper reaches of the Yellow River, Yangtze, and Mekong rivers, for which he received the Constantine Medal in 1902.

During the first decade of the 20th century, when the Great Game reached its peak, Kozlov rivaled Sven Hedin and Aurel Stein as the foremost researcher of Xinjiang. Although he was on good terms with Hedin and other foreign explorers, the British government, as represented by George Macartney, monitored his movements across Central Asia. Kozlov's 1905 visit to the Dalai Lama in Urga gave "the British War Office a fright", especially after the Lama declared his intention to "settle within the confines of Russia".

During his expedition of 1907–1909, Kozlov explored the Gobi Desert and discovered the ruins of Khara-Khoto, a Tangut city destroyed by the Ming Chinese in 1372. It took him several years to excavate the site and bring to St. Petersburg no fewer than 2,000 books in the Tangut language he uncovered there. Kozlov described his findings in a large volume entitled Mongolia and Amdo and the Dead City of Khara-Khoto (1923). He was awarded the 1911 Royal Geographical Society's Founder's Medal for his explorations.

His last expedition to Mongolia and Tibet (1923–1926) resulted in the discovery of an unprecedented number of Xiongnu royal burials at Noin-Ula. After bringing to Petrograd some amazing samples of 2000-year-old Bactrian textiles, Kozlov retired from scientific work and settled in a village near Novgorod.

Kozlov married Elizabeth Kozlova, a woman 29 years his junior, who accompanied him on his final journey of exploration as the expedition ornithologist, and who was to publish many monographs and scientific papers on the avifauna of Central Asia.

Kozlov was a mentor of the Russian explorer and writer Vladimir Arsenyev.

In 1904, the botanist Vladimir Ippolitovich Lipsky published a genus of flowering plants from Central Asia (belonging to the family Apiaceae) as Kozlovia, in Pyotr Kozlov's honour.
