= Charles Henry Coote =

Charles Henry Coote (1840–1899) was a librarian at the British Museum.

He obtained during his long service of 41 years in the Museum such an intimate acquaintance with the details of old maps that he became one of the first authorities on the subject. In 1878 he published in the New Shakspere Society's Transactions a paper on "Shakspere's New Map in Twelfth Night".

In 1886, with E. Delmar Morgan, he prepared for the Hakluyt Society Early Voyages to Russia and Persia; in 1888 he edited, with an introduction and bibliography, A Reproduction of Johann Schöner's Globe of 1523; in 1894 he published, with prologue and notes, The Voyage from Lisbon to India, 1505-6, by Albericus Vespuccius; and in 1894-95 he supplied the explanatory text to F. Muller and Co.'s reproductions of Remarkable Maps of the Fifteenth, Sixteenth, and Seventeenth Centuries. He also wrote the introduction to the Earl of Crawford's Autotype Facsimiles of Three Mappemondes. Coote contributed many articles to the ninth edition of Encyclopædia Britannica and to the Dictionary of National Biography, and he was for several years a contributor to the Athenæum.

== Selected publications ==
- A neglected fact in English history. 1864.
- The Romans in Britain. 1878.

== Attribution ==
- Adapted from Obituary. The Times, Friday, May 5, 1899; Issue 35821; pg. 10; col D
