= Mikhail Pevtsov =

Russian army officer and explorer

Colonel Mikhail Vasilyevich Pevtsov
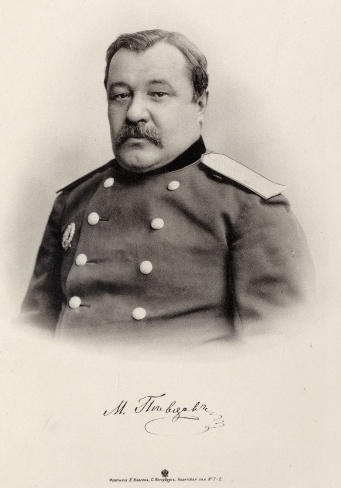
- Mikhail Pevtsov in 1902
- Born: 21 May 1843; Ustiuzhinskii district, Novgorod Governorate, Russian Empire
- Died: February 25, 1902 (aged 58); Saint Petersburg, Russian Empire
- Resting place: Smolensky Cemetery
- Occupation: Military officer

Colonel Mikhail Vasilyevich Pevtsov (21 May 1843 – 25 February 1902) was a Russian army officer and explorer known for travel and exploration in central Asia.

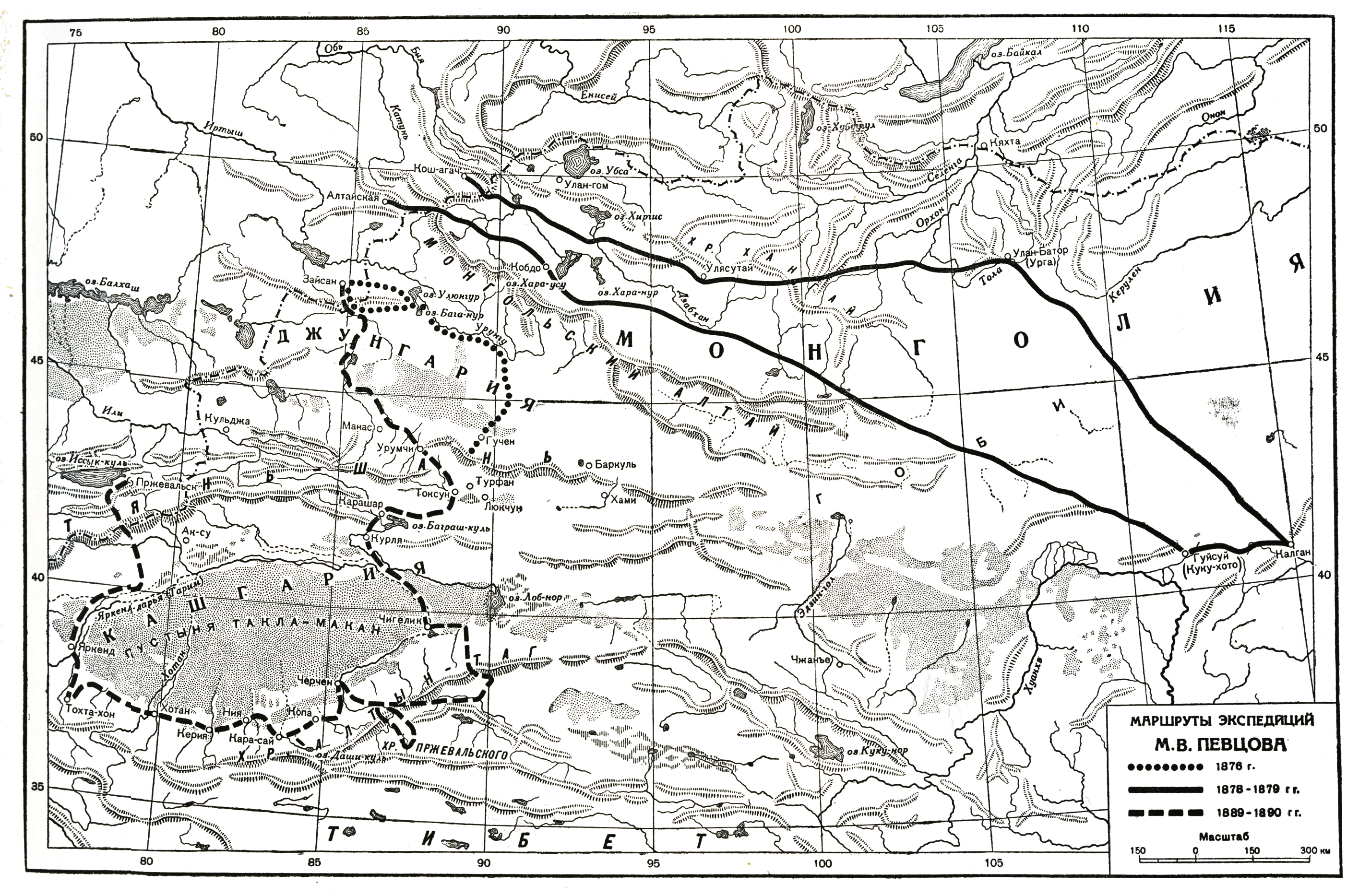
Pevtsov's travel routes

Pevtsov was born in Ustiuzhinskii district, Novgorod province in the estate of a noble family. Orphaned at seven he was raised by relatives in St. Petersburg where he went to the First St Petersburg High School before joining cadet school in Voronezh. Excelling in mathematics and geography, he caught the attention of General Baron A. I. Delvig who suggested that he joined the Nicholas General Staff Academy. He joined the 29th Infantry Tomsk Regiment stationed in Tula in 1862 and was transferred to Poland to suppress the uprising there. It was in Warsaw that he met Maria Renast whom he later married. While in St Petersburg he attended meetings of the Imperial Russian Geographical Society, becoming a member of it in 1867. In 1868 he joined the Nicholas General Staff Academy. In 1875 he was posted to Omsk under General I.F. Babkov. Here he studied Kazakh and Arabic. In 1876 he led the First Dzhungarian Expedition. Pevtsov made astronomical and meteorological observations in his travels and helped produce maps. In 1878 he led expeditions into western Mongolia and the northern regions of China. In 1889 he travelled to Tibet. After the death of N.M. Przewalski, he took over command. He was accompanied by V.I. Roborovsky and P.K. Kozlov. He suffered from poor health in later years and ran into debts. He died in St Petersburg and was buried in Smolensk cemetery.
