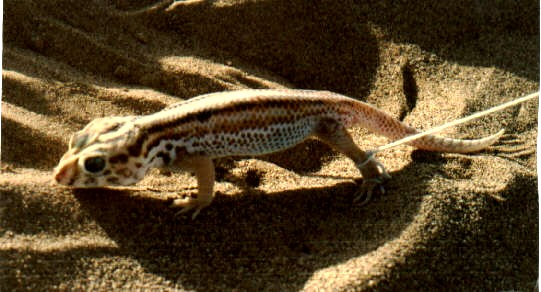

Scientific classification
- Kingdom: Animalia
- Phylum: Chordata
- Class: Reptilia
- Order: Squamata
- Suborder: Gekkota
- Family: Sphaerodactylidae
- Genus: Teratoscincus
- Species: T. scincus

Binomial name
- Teratoscincus scincus (Schlegel, 1858)

Synonyms
- Stenodactylus scincus Schlegel, 1858; Teratoscincus scincus — Boulenger, 1885

= Teratoscincus scincus =

Species of lizard

Teratoscincus scincus, commonly referred to as the common wonder gecko or the frog-eyed gecko, is a species of lizard in the family Sphaerodactylidae. The species is native to arid parts of Asia and has special adaptations which suit it to desert life.

== Description ==
Teratoscincus scincus is a large gecko growing to a total length (including tail) of about 16 cm (6.3 in). It has a broad head, large eyes, long robust limbs and a short tail. It lacks the expanded toe-pads used by many geckos for climbing, instead having digits fringed with comb-like scales which are adapted for loose sandy conditions. The scales on the head are particularly small, while those on the body, and especially the tail, are large. Adults are buff or yellowish-brown with black broken stripes or irregular dark spotting. The flanks and belly are white. Newly hatched juveniles are more vividly coloured, being bright yellow with dark crossbands.

== Distribution ==
The geographic range of T. scincus includes the Middle East, Central Asia, and westernmost East Asia. It extends over central and western Iran, western Afghanistan, northern Baluchistan and Pakistan, through the area to the east of the Caspian Sea, western China, and the Arabian Peninsula, where there are populations in Kuwait, Qatar, United Arab Emirates, Oman, Kazakhstan, Turkmenistan, Uzbekistan and Tajikistan. The type locality is the Ili River Valley in China and Kazakhstan. Two subspecies were recognised; T. s. rustamowi, from the Ferganskaya Valley in Uzbekistan, and the nominotypical subspecies T. s. scincus from the rest of the range. The former T. s. rustamowi has been elevated to full species status as Teratoscincus rustamowi.

== Habitat ==
The typical habitat of T. scincus is deserts and semi-arid areas, sand dunes and gravel plains.

== Ecology ==
T. scincus is nocturnal and digs itself a deep burrow in which it is able to keep cool and hydrated during the day. It has a varied diet which includes insects and other lizards. When attacked on the surface, it can utter a yelping vocalisation or a defensive hiss, as well as lashing its tail which results in the large scales on the tail rubbing together. If provoked, it adopts a threatening pose, standing on tiptoe, arching its back, expanding its throat, opening wide its mouth and lashing its tail. Further provocation may result in it squeaking as it rushes forward to bite its assailant. It can also autotomise (shed) its tail as a defensive strategy.
