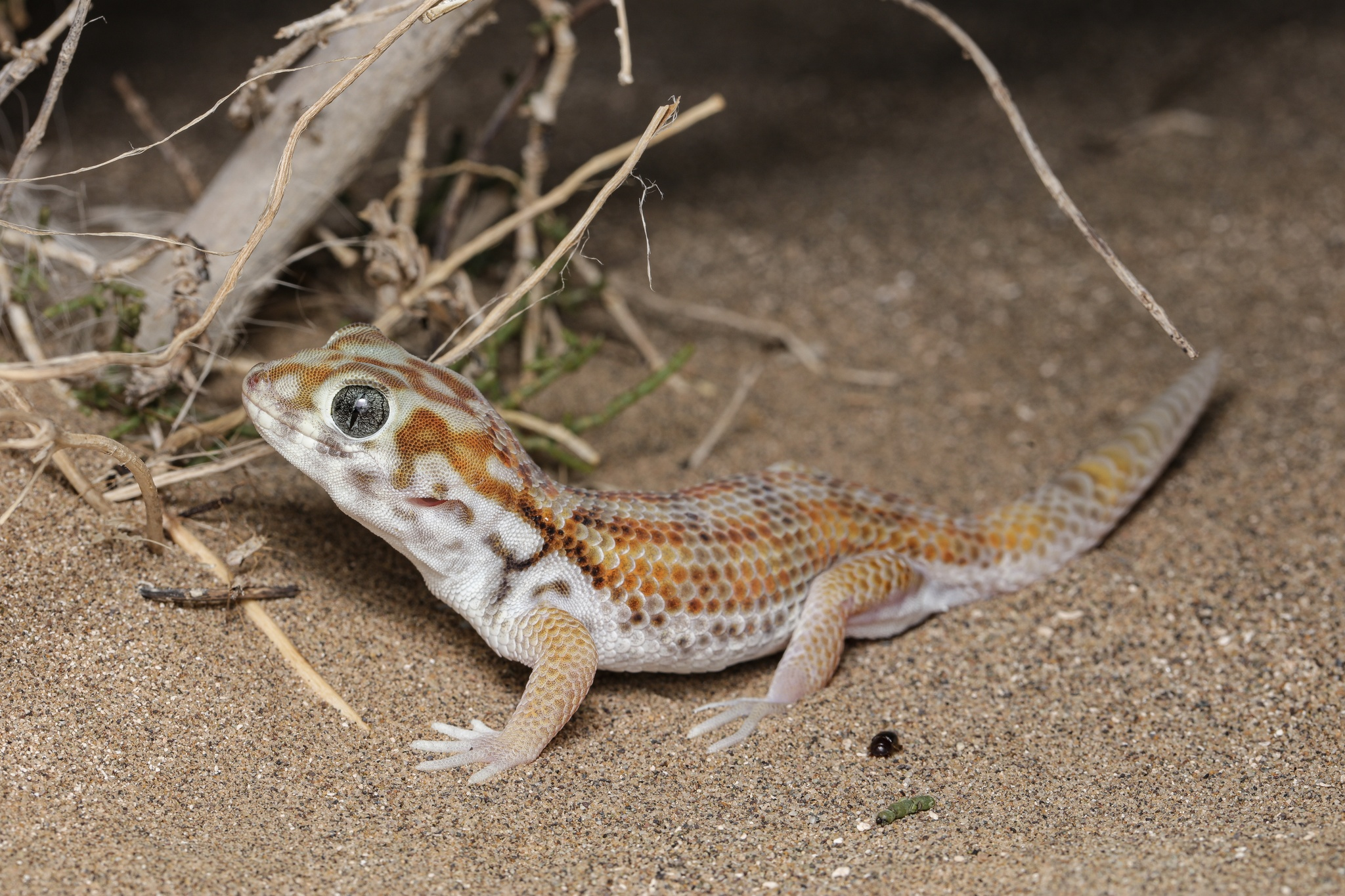
- Teratoscincus keyserlingii in Iran

Conservation status
- Least Concern (IUCN 3.1)

Scientific classification
- Kingdom: Animalia
- Phylum: Chordata
- Order: Squamata
- Suborder: Gekkota
- Family: Sphaerodactylidae
- Genus: Teratoscincus
- Species: T. keyserlingii

Binomial name
- Teratoscincus keyserlingii Strauch, 1863

Synonyms
- Teratoscincus keyserlingii Strauch, 1863; Teratoscincus zarudnyi Nikolsky, 1896; Teratoscincus scincus keyserlingii — Szczerbak & Golubev, 1996; Teratoscincus keyserlingii — Macey et al., 2005

= Persian wonder gecko =

Species of lizard

The Persian wonder gecko (Teratoscincus keyserlingii), also known commonly as the giant frog-eyed gecko and Keyserling's wonder gecko, is a species of lizard in the family Sphaerodactylidae. The species is native to western Asia.

== Etymology ==
The specific name, keyserlingii, is in honor of Alexander von Keyserling, who was a Baltic German geologist and biologist.

== Geographic range ==
T. keyserlingii is found in Afghanistan, Iran, Pakistan, and the United Arab Emirates.

== Habitat ==
The preferred natural habitat of T. keyserlingii is desert, at altitudes from sea level to 1,500 m (4,900 ft).

== Description ==
The holotype of T. keyserlingii has a total length of 15.8 cm (6.2 in), which includes a tail 5.6 cm (2.2 in) long.

== Behavior ==
T. keyserlingii is terrestrial and nocturnal.

== Reproduction ==
T. keyserlingii is oviparous.
