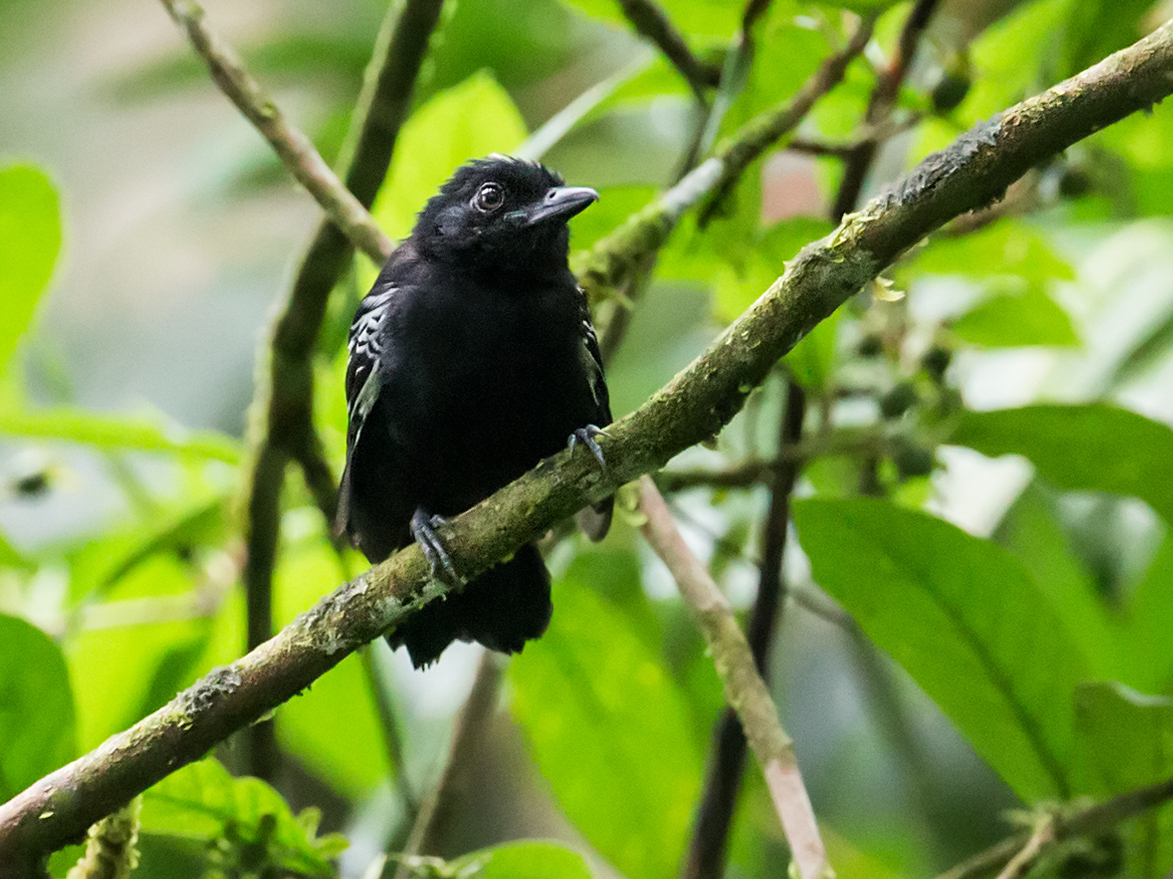

Conservation status
- Least Concern (IUCN 3.1)

Scientific classification
- Kingdom: Animalia
- Phylum: Chordata
- Class: Aves
- Order: Passeriformes
- Family: Thamnophilidae
- Genus: Thamnophilus
- Species: T. cryptoleucus

Binomial name
- Thamnophilus cryptoleucus (Ménégaux & Hellmayr, 1906)

= Castelnau's antshrike =

Species of bird

Castelnau's antshrike (Thamnophilus cryptoleucus) is a species of bird in subfamily Thamnophilinae of family Thamnophilidae, the "typical antbirds". It is found in Brazil, Colombia, Ecuador, and Peru.

== Taxonomy and systematics ==
Castelnau's antshrike was originally described as Myrmelastes cryptoleucus. By the principle of priority, Myrmelastes is junior to Myrmeciza. In 1924 it was transferred to that genus and then in 1927 to its current Thamnophilus. Later some authors treated Castelnau's antshrike as a subspecies of the blackish-grey antshrike (T. nigrocinereus), but that approach was not widely accepted. They are now considered sister species. Castelnau's antshrike is monotypic.

== Description ==
Castelnau's antshrike is 16 to 18 cm (6.3 to 7.1 in) long and weighs 30 to 35 g (1.1 to 1.2 oz). Members of genus Thamnophilus are largish members of the antbird family; all have stout bills with a hook like those of true shrikes. This species exhibits slight sexual dimorphism. Adult males are mostly black. They have a mostly hidden white patch between their scapulars, white tips on the scapulars, white tips and edges on their wing coverts, sometimes very small white tips on their flight feathers, and white underwing coverts. Their flanks and belly are dark gray. Adult females are similar to males but their scapulars and wing coverts are entirely black. Subadults are similar to adult females but browner. Both sexes have a brown iris, a black bill, and blue-gray legs and feet.

== Distribution and habitat ==
Castelnau's antshrike is found along the upper Amazon River and its major upstream tributaries. It occurs along the Rio Napo in Ecuador and Peru to where it enters the Amazon. In Ecuador it also occurs along the Río Pastaza and presumably further downstream on that river in Peru. In Peru it also occurs along the rios Marañón and Ucayali. In Colombia it occurs in the extreme south along the Amazon, and in Brazil along the Amazon almost to the Rio Negro. Castelnau's antshrike is found almost exclusively on river islands but also occurs on the "mainland" near the rivers. In all areas it occurs mostly in dense understorey but commonly into the mid-storey as well. In elevation it occurs only as high as about 300 m (1,000 ft).

== Behavior ==
=== Movement ===
Castelnau's antshrike is presumed to be a year-round resident throughout its range.

=== Feeding ===
The diet of Castelnau's antshrike is not known in detail but includes insects and other arthropods. It usually forages singly or in pairs and seldom joins mixed-species feeding flocks. It usually forages between 1 and 3 m (3 and 10 ft) of the ground but does feed as high as 9 m (30 ft). It forages while hopping among branches, commonly reaching or making short jumps from a perch to glean prey.

=== Breeding ===
Little is known about the breeding biology of Castelnau's antshrike. The only described nests were found during June and July in Peru; other evidence suggests that the species' breeding season extends from March to October. The nests were a cup made mostly of grass and suspended in a branch fork 1 to 3 m (3 to 10 ft) above the ground. The clutch size was two eggs. The incubation period, time to fledging, and details of parental care are not known.

=== Vocalization ===
The song of Castelnau's antshrike has been described as "a short, fast, accelerating 'keoh, keoh, kuh-kuh-kuhkuhkuhkuhkuh' with [a] nasal, bouncing-ball quality" and as "an accelerating, descending series of downslurred notes: kyuk kyuk-kyew-kew-kew'ku'ku'kukuku". Its calls include "a drawn-out 'kawh' " that is sometimes doubled or in a series and "a 'kowah, kr-r-r-' ". These are also described as "a cawing raow [and] raow-brrrrrrrrr".

== Status ==
The IUCN originally in 2012 assessed Castlenau's antshrike as Near Threatened but in 2023 downlisted to being of Least Concern. It has a large range; its population size is not known and is believed to be decreasing. "The primary threat to this species is accelerating deforestation in the Amazon basin, as land is cleared for agricultural production. It is rendered particularly susceptible because of its reliance on islands and riparian forest, which are easily accessible and therefore subject to higher levels of human encroachment and logging activities." "Human activity has little short-term direct effect on Castelnau's Antshrike, other than the local effects of habitat destruction; this species occupies successional habitats, however, and is tolerant of a low level of human disturbance. In the longer term, Castelnau's Antshrike potentially is vulnerable to widespread habitat loss, as might occur through perturbations of the Amazonian hydrological regime stemming from widespread deforestation, dam construction, or global climate change."
