= Edward Delmar Morgan =

British explorer and writer (1840–1909)

Edward Delmar Morgan (19 April 1840 – 18 May 1909) was an English explorer, translator and author.

== Life ==
He was born in Stratford, Essex, on 19 April 1840 to Edward John Morgan and Mary Anne Parland. He attended Eton College from 1854 to 1857. After that, he lived in St. Petersburg with his parents and learned to speak Russian at that point. He went on to use his fluency in English and Russian to become a translator. On 25 September 1873, he was married to Bertha Jardine and had seven children with her – four sons and three daughters. In his later years, his home was in Copthorne, Sussex, which is where he was buried after his death on 18 May 1909.

Morgan also travelled in his adult years. In 1872, he traveled in Persia in the company of Sir John Underwood Bateman-Champain (one of the directors of the Indo-European Telegraph Company), and visited Kulja and the surrounding area. He later made expeditions to Ukraine, as he was familiar with the language and literature. In 1883, he travelled to the lower part of the Congo, east Africa, and the Baku oil region of Caucasia.

Morgan put is translating skills to work in 1876, and translated Colonel Nikolay Przhevalsky’s Mongolia, the Tangut Country and the Solitudes of Northern Tibet from Russian, edited by Sir Henry Yule. In 1879, he translated From Kulja across the Tien Shan (TianShan) to Lobnor by Przevalsky, now edited by Sir Thomas Douglas Forsyth. During his years with the Hakluyt Society, he collaborated with C. H. Hoote in editing Early Voyages and Travels to Russia and Persia, by Anthony Jenkinson and other Englishmen.

As well as travelling and translating, Morgan was a fellow of Royal Geographical Society for 40 years and served on its council, contributed to its Journal. He and other members successfully convinced the society above to organize the Sixth International Geographical Congress, which took place in 1895. He was also an honorary secretary of Hakluyt Society from 1886 until 1892. He was also the honorary treasurer for the Ninth International Congress of Orientalists in 1892 in London (under Max Muller’s presidency) and edited its transactions in 1893.

== Sources ==
- Howarth, O. J. R. “Morgan, Edward Delmar (1840–1909).” Rev. Elizabeth Baigent. Oxford Dictionary of National Biography. Ed. H. C. G. Matthew and Brian Harrison. Oxford: OUP, 2004. 14 Oct. 2007
