= Mensheviks =

Faction of the Russian Social Democratic Labour Party

Mensheviks меньшевики (Russian)
- Leader: Julius Martov
- Founded: 23 August 1903
- Dissolved: 1912
- Succeeded by: Russian Social Democratic Labour Party (Mensheviks)
- Ideology: Communism; Marxism; Reformism
- Political position: Left-wing to far-left
- National affiliation: Russian Social Democratic Labour Party

The Mensheviks (Note: Russian: меньшевики, romanized: men'sheviki, IPA: [mʲɪnʲʂɨvʲɪˈkʲi]; from меньшинство men'shinstvo [mʲɪnʲʂɨnstˈvo] 'minority') were a faction of the Marxist Russian Social Democratic Labour Party (RSDLP) which split with Vladimir Lenin's Bolshevik faction at the Second Party Congress in 1903. Mensheviks held more reformist views as compared to the Bolsheviks, and were led by figures including Julius Martov and Pavel Axelrod.

The initial point of disagreement was the Mensheviks' support for a broad party membership, as opposed to Lenin's support for a smaller party of professional revolutionaries. The Bolsheviks gained a majority on the Central Committee in 1903, although the power of the two factions fluctuated in the following years. Mensheviks were associated with Georgi Plekhanov's position that a bourgeois-democratic revolution and period of capitalism would need to occur before the conditions for a socialist revolution emerged. Some Mensheviks, notably Alexander Potresov, called for the party to suspend illegal revolutionary work to focus more on trade union work (legal since 1906) and elections to the Duma; this was condemned by Lenin.

In 1912, the RSDLP formally split into Bolshevik and Menshevik parties.

== History of the split ==
=== 1903–1906 ===
At the 2nd Congress of the RSDLP in August 1903, Julius Martov and Vladimir Lenin disagreed, firstly, with regard to which persons should be in the editorial committee of Iskra, the Party newspaper; secondly, in regards to the definition of a "party member" in the future Party statute:

- Lenin's formulation required the party member to be a member of one of the Party's organizations
- Martov's only stated that he should work under the guidance of a Party organization.

Although the difference in definitions was small, with Lenin's being more exclusive, it was indicative of what became an essential difference between the philosophies of the two emerging factions: Lenin argued for a small party of professional revolutionaries with a large fringe of non-party sympathizers and supporters, whereas Martov believed it was better to have a large party of activists with broad representation.

Martov's proposal was accepted by the majority of the delegates (28 votes to 23). However, after seven delegates stormed out of the Congress—five of whom were representatives of the Jewish Bund who left in protest about their own federalist proposal being defeated—Lenin's supporters won a slight majority, which was reflected in the composition of the Central Committee and the other central party organs elected at the Congress. This was also the reason behind the naming of the factions. It was later hypothesized that Lenin had purposely offended some of the delegates in order to have them leave the meeting in protest, giving him a majority. However, Bolsheviks and Mensheviks were united in voting against the Bundist proposal, which lost 41 to 5. Despite the outcome of the Congress, the following years saw the Mensheviks gathering considerable support among regular social democrats and effectively building up a parallel party organization.

=== 1906–1916 ===
At the 4th Congress of the RSDLP in 1906, a reunification was formally achieved. In contrast to the 2nd Congress, the Mensheviks were in the majority from start to finish, yet Martov's definition of a party member, which had prevailed at the 1st Congress, was replaced by Lenin's. On the other hand, numerous disagreements about alliances and strategy emerged. The two factions kept their separate structures and continued to operate separately.

As before, both factions believed that Russia was not developed enough to make socialism possible and that therefore the revolution which they planned, aiming to overthrow the Tsarist regime, would be a bourgeois-democratic revolution. Both believed that the working class had to contribute to this revolution. However, after 1905 the Mensheviks were more inclined to work with the liberal bourgeois democratic parties such as the Constitutional Democrats because these would be the "natural" leaders of a bourgeois revolution. In contrast, the Bolsheviks believed that the Constitutional Democrats were not capable of sufficiently radical struggle and tended to advocate alliances with peasant representatives and other radical socialist parties such as the Socialist Revolutionaries. In the event of a revolution, this was meant to lead to a dictatorship of the proletariat and the peasantry, which would carry the bourgeois revolution to the end. The Mensheviks came to argue for predominantly legal methods and trade union work, while the Bolsheviks favoured armed violence.

Some Mensheviks left the party after the defeat of 1905 and joined legal opposition organisations. After a while, Lenin's patience wore out with their compromising and, in 1908, he called these Mensheviks "liquidationists".

=== 1912–1914 ===
In 1912, the RSDLP had its final split, with the Bolsheviks constituting the Russian Social Democratic Labour Party (Bolsheviks), and the Mensheviks the Russian Social Democratic Labour Party (Mensheviks). The Menshevik faction split further in 1917 at the middle of World War I. Most Mensheviks opposed the war, but a vocal minority supported it in terms of "national defense".

In 1917, 50% of the Menshevik leadership were Jewish.

== See also ==
- Anti-Leninism
- Centrocaspian Dictatorship
- Golos Sotsial-Demokrata
- Orthodox Marxism
- Reformist Marxism
- Transcaspian Government
