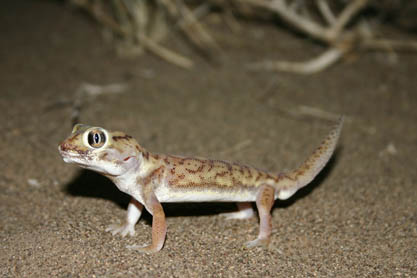

Scientific classification
- Kingdom: Animalia
- Phylum: Chordata
- Class: Reptilia
- Order: Squamata
- Suborder: Gekkota
- Family: Sphaerodactylidae
- Genus: Teratoscincus
- Species: T. microlepis

Binomial name
- Teratoscincus microlepis Nikolsky, 1900

= Small-scaled wonder gecko =

Species of lizard

The small-scaled wonder gecko (Teratoscincus microlepis) is a species of lizard in the family Sphaerodactylidae. The species is endemic to Western and South Asia.

== Geographic range ==
T. microlepis is found in southeastern Iran, Afghanistan, and southwestern Pakistan (Balochistan province).

== Description ==
T. microlepis may attain a snout-to-vent length of 6.7 cm (2.6 in), with a tail 4.2 cm (1.7 in) long.

== Reproduction ==
T. microlepis is oviparous.
