= Teratoscincus sistanense =

Scientific classification
- Kingdom: Animalia
- Phylum: Chordata
- Class: Reptilia
- Order: Squamata
- Suborder: Gekkota
- Family: Sphaerodactylidae
- Genus: Teratoscincus
- Species: T. sistanense

Binomial name
- Teratoscincus sistanense Akbarpour, Shafiei, Sehhatisabet & Damadi, 2017

Species of lizard

Teratoscincus sistanense is a small species of gecko, a lizard in the family Sphaerodactylidae. The species is endemic to Iran.

== Geographic range ==
T. sistanense is found in Sistan and Baluchestan Province in southeastern Iran.

== Habitat ==
The preferred habitat of T. sistanensis is a hot and dry climate, with flat sandy soil interspersed with patches of gravel or loamy-silty soil, and sparse vegetation mainly of the genus Tamarix.

== Description ==
T. sistanense has 145-165 scales around the body at midbody, the most of any species in its genus. The first upper labial does not form part of the margin of the nostril.

== Behavior ==
T. sistanense is nocturnal.
