= Teratoscincus mesriensis =

Scientific classification
- Kingdom: Animalia
- Phylum: Chordata
- Class: Reptilia
- Order: Squamata
- Suborder: Gekkota
- Family: Sphaerodactylidae
- Genus: Teratoscincus
- Species: T. mesriensis

Binomial name
- Teratoscincus mesriensis Nazarov, Radjabizadeh, Poyarkov, Ananjeva, Melnikov & Rastegar-Pouyani, 2017

Species of lizard

Teratoscincus mesriensis is a species of gecko, a lizard in the family Sphaerodactylidae. The species is endemic to Iran.

== Etymology ==
The specific name, mesriensis, is a Latinized toponymic adjective, meaning "from Mesr", the village near which the species was discovered.

== Geographic range ==
T. mesriensis is found in Isfahan Province, Iran.

== Description ==
T. mesriensis is a medium-sized gecko. Maximum recorded snout-to-vent length (SVL) is 9.36 cm (3.69 in).
