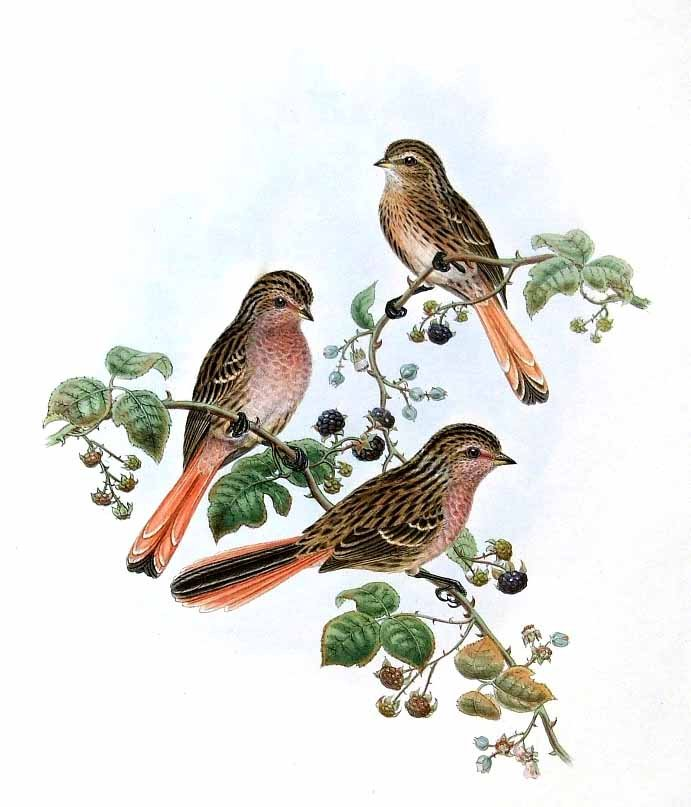

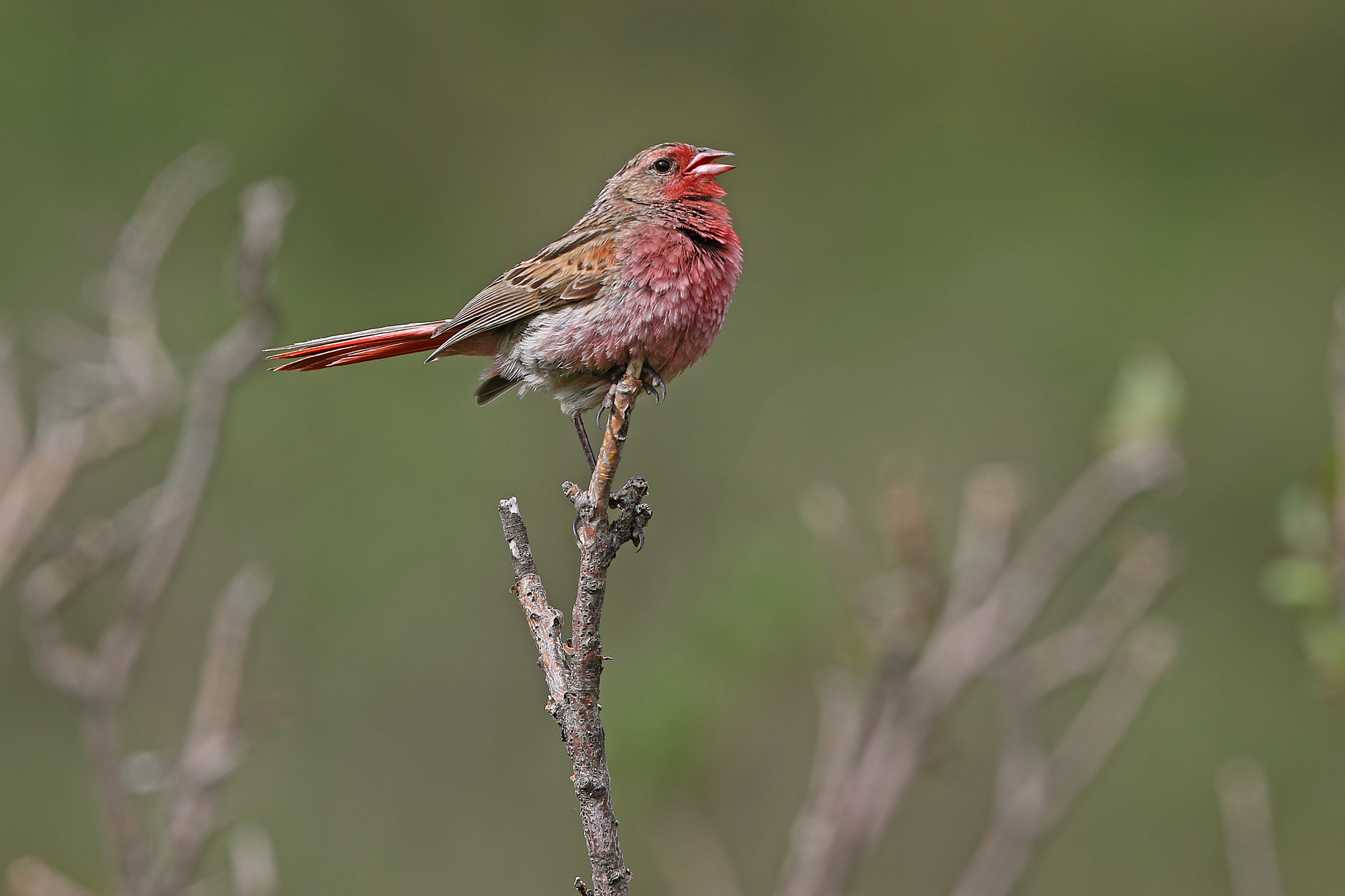

Conservation status
- Least Concern (IUCN 3.1)

Scientific classification
- Kingdom: Animalia
- Phylum: Chordata
- Class: Aves
- Order: Passeriformes
- Parvorder: Passerida
- Family: Urocynchramidae; Domaniewski, 1918
- Genus: Urocynchramus; Przevalski, 1876
- Species: U. pylzowi

Binomial name
- Urocynchramus pylzowi Przhevalsky, 1876

= Przevalski's finch =

Species of bird

Przevalski's finch (Urocynchramus pylzowi), Przewalski's finch or Przevalski's pinktail, is an unusual passerine bird endemic to the mountains of central-west China. The species is named after Mikhail Pyltsov, the Russian explorer who accompanied Nikolai Przhevalsky on the expedition in which specimens of the bird were collected. Its taxonomic affinities were unclear for a long time, giving rise to other common names, the pink-tailed bunting and the Przewalski's rosefinch. In 2000 it was proposed that it should in fact be regarded neither as a finch nor a bunting, but as the only member of the family Urocynchramidae, something that had been originally proposed in the German ornithological literature as long ago as 1918 by Janusz von Domaniewski, and also by Wolters in 1979. This change was adopted in the sixth edition of the Clements checklist.

== Description and ecology ==
Przewalski's finch is a small bird similar in appearance to the long-tailed rosefinch. The tail is long and – quite unlike in typical finches – graduated, with the outer feathers much shorter than the central ones. The sexes are dimorphic, with the males having bright pink on the throat, breast and belly. Both sexes have brown streaked plumage on the back and wings. The bill is thinner than those of the rosefinches. The morphological feature which is diagnostic for the Urocynchramidae is the outer primary; in finches and buntings this feather is vestigial but in the Przewalski's finch it is two-thirds the length of the next primary.

This bird lives at elevations between 3,050 and 5,000 metres (10,010 and 16,400 ft), usually in pairs during the breeding season and in small flocks during the winter. Przhevalsky described the species' song as similar to that of buntings. The species has not been studied much in the wild, and little is known of its behaviour. It is not thought to be threatened by human activities and is listed as least concern on the IUCN Red List.
