= Przewalski's wonder gecko =

Conservation status
- Least Concern (IUCN 3.1)

Scientific classification
- Kingdom: Animalia
- Phylum: Chordata
- Class: Reptilia
- Order: Squamata
- Suborder: Gekkota
- Family: Sphaerodactylidae
- Genus: Teratoscincus
- Species: T. przewalskii

Binomial name
- Teratoscincus przewalskii Strauch, 1887

Species of lizard

Przewalski's wonder gecko (Teratoscincus przewalskii) is a species of lizard in the family Sphaerodactylidae. The species is endemic to East Asia.

== Etymology ==
The specific name, przewalskii, is in honor of Russian explorer and naturalist Nikolai Mikhailovitch Prjevalsky.

== Geographic range ==
T. przewalskii is found in China and Mongolia.

== Habitat ==
The preferred habitats of T. przewalskii are desert and grassland, at altitudes of 500–2,000 m (1,600–6,600 ft).

== Reproduction ==
T. przewalskii is oviparous.
