= Golos Sotsial-Demokrata =

Golos Sotsial-Demokrata (Russian: Голос Социал-Демократа, lit. 'Voice of the Social Democrat') was a Russian-language publication, issued by a section of exiled Mensheviks.

== History and profile ==
Golos Sotsial-Demokrata began publication in February 1908 in Geneva and was then published in Paris from 1909–1911, ceasing in December 1911 with its twenty-sixth issue.
