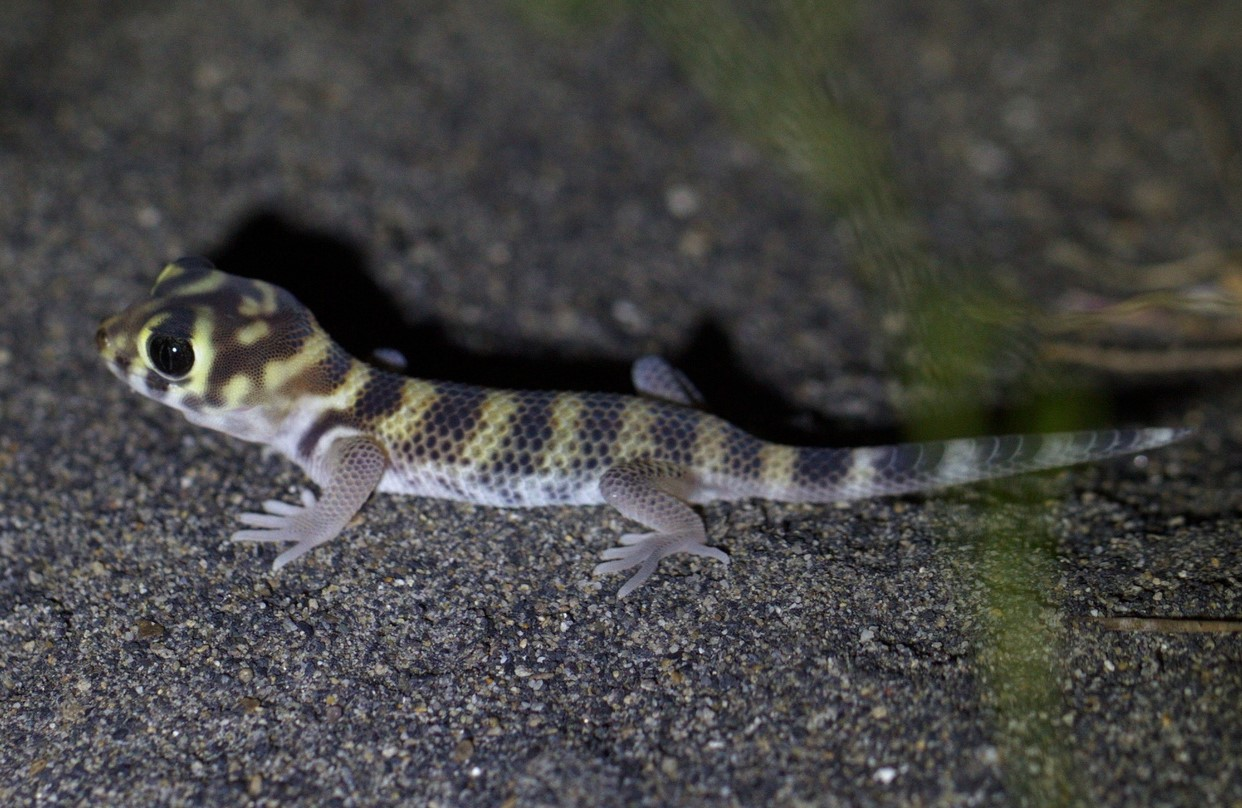

Conservation status
- Endangered (IUCN 3.1)

Scientific classification
- Kingdom: Animalia
- Phylum: Chordata
- Class: Reptilia
- Order: Squamata
- Suborder: Gekkota
- Family: Sphaerodactylidae
- Genus: Teratoscincus
- Species: T. rustamowi

Binomial name
- Teratoscincus rustamowi Szczerbak, 1979

Synonyms
- Teratoscincus scincus rustamovi [sic] Szczerbak, 1979; Teratoscincus rustamowi — de Lisle et al., 2013

= Teratoscincus rustamowi =

Species of lizard

Teratoscincus rustamowi is a small species of gecko, a lizard in the family Sphaerodactylidae. The species is endemic to Uzbekistan.

== Description ==
The maximum recorded snout-to-vent length (SVL) for T. rustamowi is 8.1 cm (3.2 in).

== Reproduction ==
T. rustamowi is oviparous.
