= Janusz Domaniewski =

Polish ornithologist

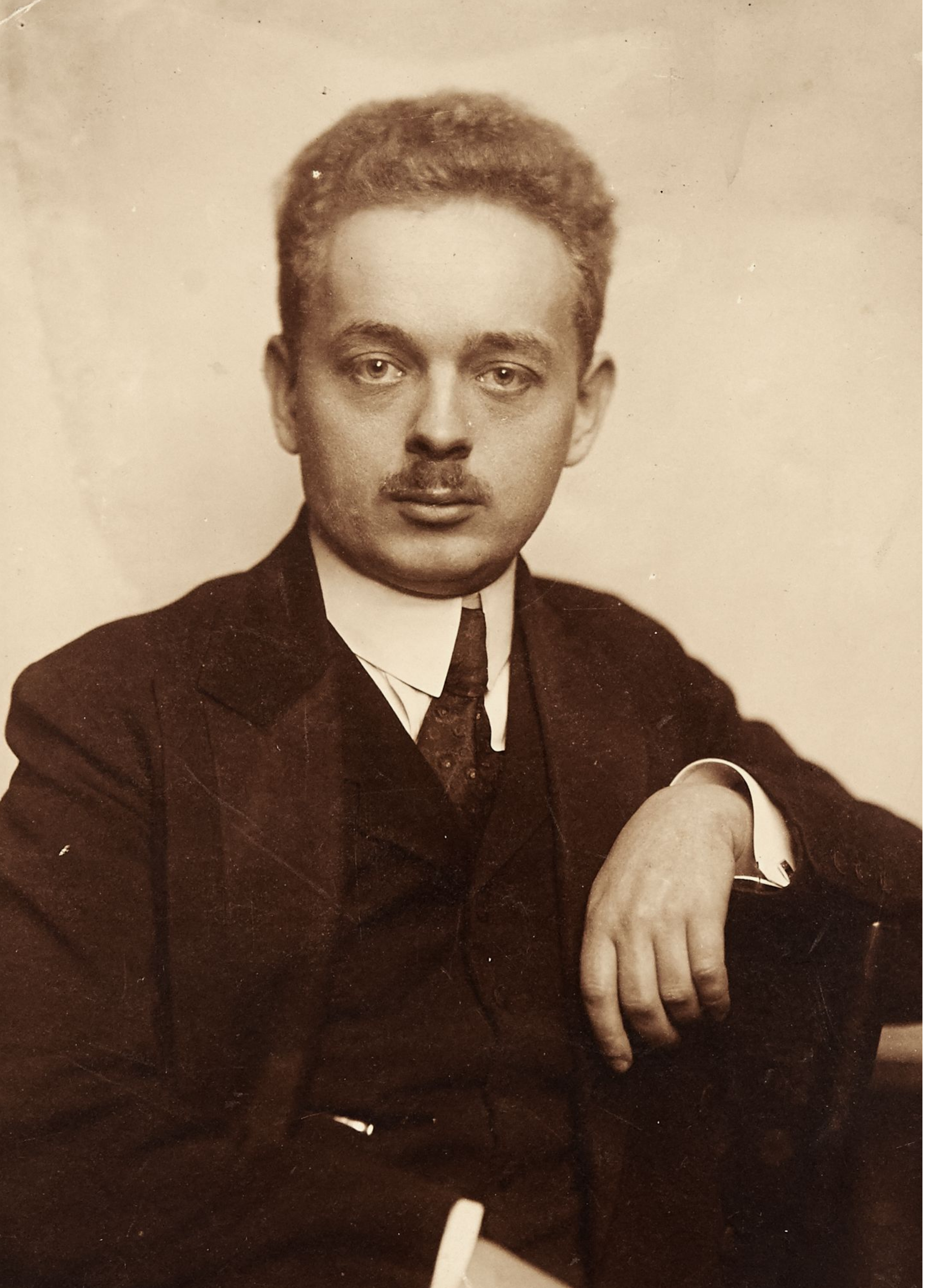
Janusz Domaniewski

Janusz Witold Domaniewski (30 April 1891 – 15 March 1954) was a Polish ornithologist and conservationist. He was a curator at the Warsaw zoological museum and was involved in the establishment of a nature preserve in the Tatra mountains.

== Life and work ==
Domaniewski was born in Krakow. He studied at the Jagiellonian University and made visits to Zakopane both with family and during his studies. In 1921 he moved to live in Zakopane where his wife Irena was to recover from a lung illness and returned to Warsaw in 1930 to serve at the museum. In 1949 he returned to Zakopane, living there until his death.

Domaniewski wrote extensively about hunting and the fauna of the Tatra mountains. His published works include the following:

- 1918: Die Stellung des Urocynchramus pylzowi Przev. in der Systematik. J. Ornithol. 66(4): 421–424. doi:10.1007/BF02251733 (first appraisal of the true distinctness of Przewalski's finch)
- 1924: Beitrag zur Kenntnis der Gattung Thamnophilus Vieillot. Bull. Acad. Polonaise des Sci. et des Lettres: 753–763. (review of the species and subspecies of the genus Thamnophilus)
- 1925:
  - Contribution a la connaissance des pics paléarctiques. Ann. Zool. Mus. Polonici Hist. Nat.: 75–84. (taxonomic review of Palaearctic woodpeckers)
  - Systematik und geographische Verbreitung der Gattung Budytes. Ann. Zool. Mus. Polonici Hist. Nat.: 85-125. (review of the genus Budytes)
