= Golos Prikazchika =

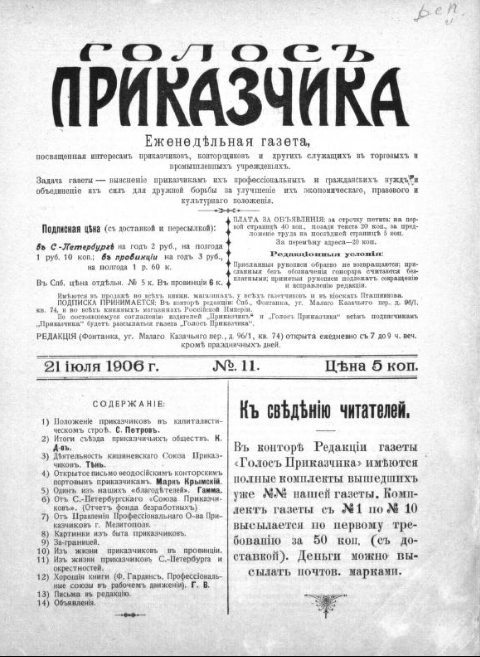
Cover of Golos Prikazchika

Golos Prikazchika (Russian: Голосъ Приказчика, 'Shop-Assistant's Voice') was a weekly newspaper published in St. Petersburg, Russia, from April to October 1906.
