= Nikolay Przhevalsky =

Polish-Russian explorer (1839–1888)

- Николай Пржевальский
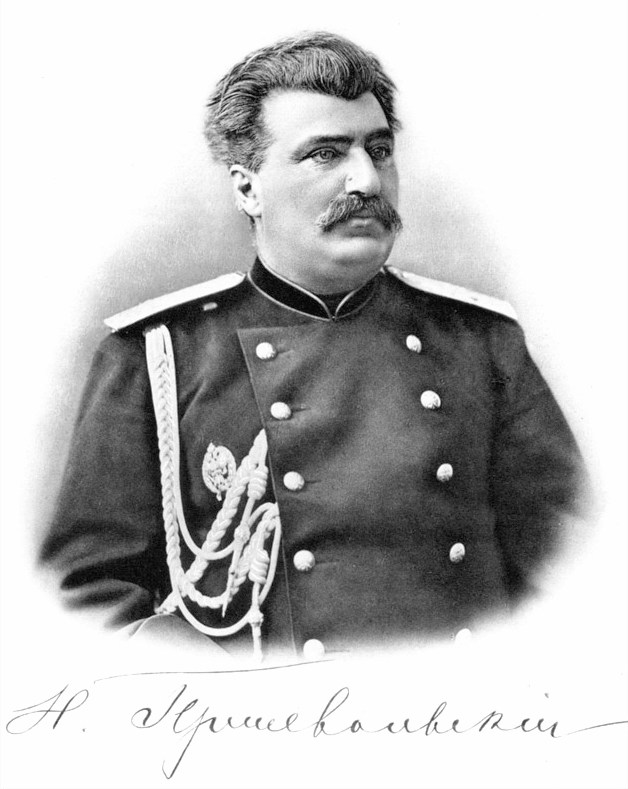
- Przhevalsky in 1888
- Born: 12 April 1839; Kimborovo, Smolensky Uyezd, Smolensk Governorate, Russian Empire
- Died: 1 November 1888 (aged 49); Karakol, Russian Empire (now Kyrgyzstan)
- Known for: Exploration of Central Asia
- Awards: Vega Medal (1884)

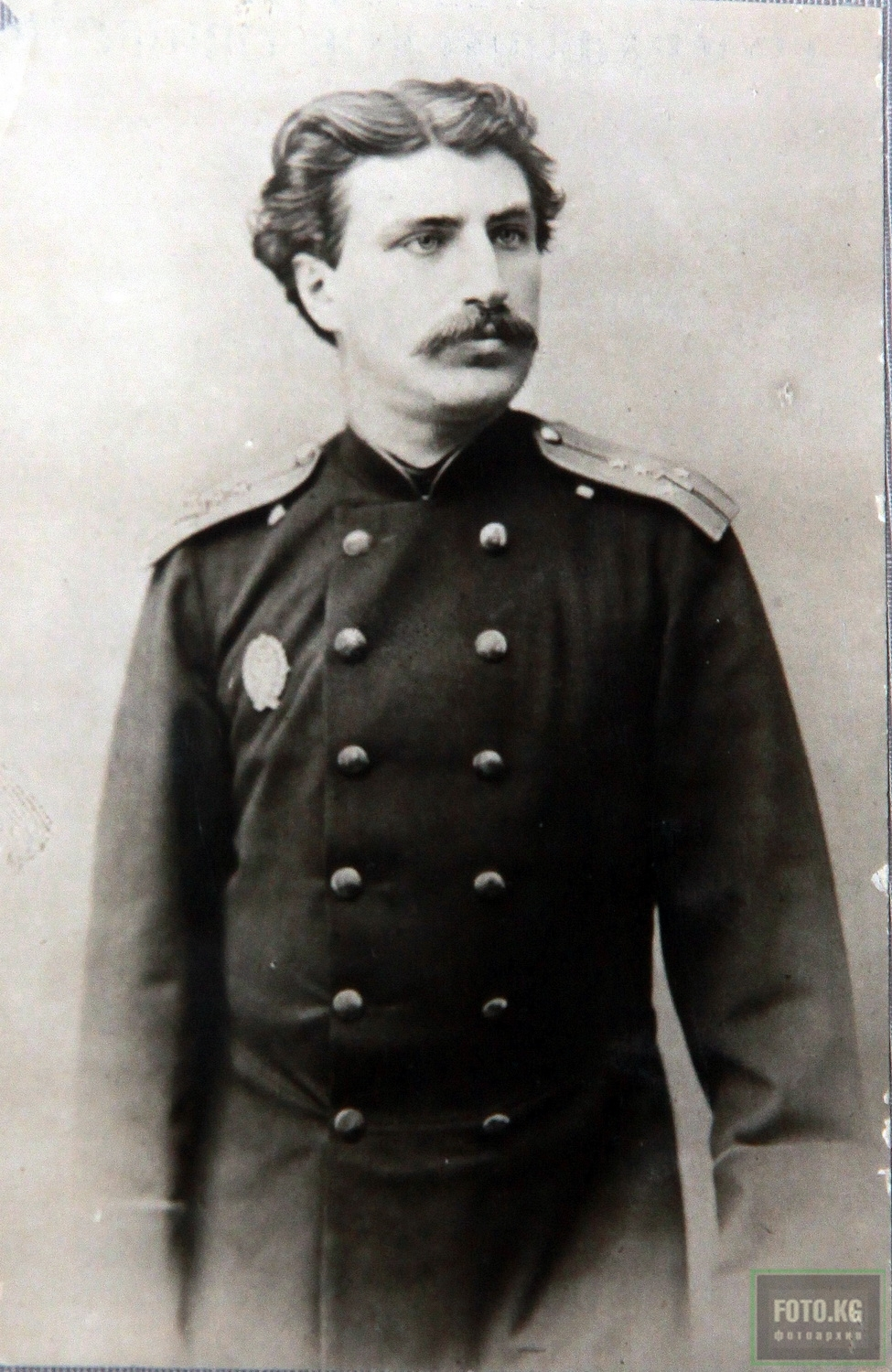
Przhevalsky in 1860 (age 21)

Nikolay Mikhaylovich Przhevalsky (or Przewalski or Prjevalsky; (Note: UK: /ˌpɜːrʒəˈvælski/ PUR-zhə-VAL-skee, US: /-ˈvɑːl-/ -VAHL-; Russian: Никола́й Миха́йлович Пржева́льский, IPA: [nʲɪkɐˈlaj mʲɪˈxajləvʲɪtɕ prʐɨˈvalʲskʲɪj]; Polish: Nikołaj Przewalski, IPA: [ɲiˈkɔwaj pʂɛˈvalskʲi].) 12 April [O.S. 31 March] 1839 – 1 November [O.S. 20 October] 1888) was a Russian geographer and a renowned explorer of Central and East Asia. Although he never reached his ultimate goal, the city of Lhasa in Tibet, he still travelled through regions then unknown to Westerners, such as northern Tibet (modern Tibet Autonomous Region), Amdo (now Qinghai) and Dzungaria (now northern Xinjiang). He contributed substantially to European knowledge of Central Asian geography.

Przhevalsky described several species previously unknown to European science, such as Przewalski's horse, Przewalski's gazelle, and the wild Bactrian camel, all of which are now endangered. He was also a mentor of the explorer Pyotr Kozlov.

== Biography ==
Przhevalsky was born in the Kimborovo family estate (in the Smolensky Uyezd of the Smolensk Governorate of the Russian Empire) which belonged to his grandfather from his mother's side, a Russian nobleman Aleksei Stepanovich Karetnikov, and his wife Ksenia Davydovna Karetnikova who came from local merchants, both natives of the Tula Governorate. Nikolay's mother, Elena Alekseevna Karetnikova, married poruchick Mikhail Kuzmitch Przhevalsky whose Zaporozhian Cossack ancestors in the Polish–Lithuanian Commonwealth inherited the noble szlachta state from the Polish king Stephen Báthory, and his grandfather converted from Catholicism to Orthodoxy. According to the latest research by Liudmila K. Przhevalskaia, their earliest known ancestor Onisim (Anisim) Pereval (Perevalka, Perevalskii) belonged to the horse-owning middle class of Vitebsk.

Przhevalsky studied in the military academy in St. Petersburg. In 1864, he became a geography teacher at the military school in Warsaw. In 1867, he successfully petitioned the Russian Geographical Society to be dispatched to Irkutsk, in central Siberia. His intention was to explore the basin of the Ussuri River, a major tributary of the Amur on the Russian–Chinese frontier. This was his first important expedition. It lasted two years, after which Przhevalsky published a diary of his expedition under the title, Travels in the Ussuri Region, 1867–69.

His most well-known follower and student was Pyotr Kozlov, who discovered the ruins of the Tangut city Khara-Khoto in the Ejin Banner of Alxa League in western Inner Mongolia near the Juyan Lake Basin.

== Further expeditions ==
In the following years he made four journeys to Central Asia:

- 1870–1873 from Kyakhta he crossed the Gobi Desert to Beijing then explored the upper Yangtze, and in 1872 crossed into Tibet. He surveyed over 7,000 sq mi (18,000 km^{2}), collected and brought back with him 5000 plants, 1000 birds and 3000 insect species, as well as 70 reptiles and the skins of 130 different mammals. Przehevalsky was awarded the Constantine Medal by the Imperial Geographical Society, promoted to lieutenant-general, appointed to the Tsar's General Staff, and received the Order of St. Vladimir, 4th Class.

During his expedition, the Dungan Revolt (1862–77) was raging in China. The journey provided the General Staff with important intelligence on a Muslim uprising in the kingdom of Yaqub Beg in western China, and his lecture to the Russian Imperial Geographical Society was received with "thunderous applause" from an overflow audience. The Russian newspaper Golos Prikazchika called the journey "one of the most daring of our time".

- 1876–1877 travelling through East Turkestan through the Tian Shan, he visited what he believed to be Qinghai Lake, which had reportedly not been visited by any European since Marco Polo. (Note: Author August Strindberg, however, believed that Przhevalsky was preceded by Johan Gustaf Renat by almost two centuries.) The expedition consisted of ten men, twenty-four camels, four horses, three tonnes of baggage and a budget of 25,000 rubles, but the expedition was beset by disease and poor quality camels. In September 1877, the caravan was refurbished with better camels and horses, 72,000 rounds of ammunition and large quantities of brandy, tea and Turkish delight and set out for Lhasa, but did not reach its goal.
- 1879–1880 via Hami and through the Qaidam Basin to Qinghai Lake. The expedition then crossed the Tian Shan into Tibet, proceeding to within 260 km (160 mi) of Lhasa before being turned back by Tibetan officials.
- 1883–1885 from Kyakhta across the Gobi to Alashan and the eastern Tian Shan mountains, turning back at the Yangze. The expedition then returned to Qinghai Lake and moved westwards to Hotan and Issyk Kul.

The results of these expanded journeys opened a new era for the study of Central Asian geography as well as studies of the fauna and flora of this immense region that were relatively unknown to his Western contemporaries. Among other things, he described Przewalski's horse and Przewalski's gazelle, which were both named after him. He also described what was then considered to be a wild population of Bactrian camel. In the 21st century, the Wild Bactrian camel was shown to be a separate species from the domestic Bactrian camel. Przhevalsky's writings include five major books written in Russian and two English translations: Mongolia, the Tangut Country, and the Solitudes of Northern Tibet (1875) and From Kulja, Across the Tian Shan to Lob-Nor (1879). The Royal Geographical Society awarded him their Founder's Medal in 1879 for his work.

== Death and legacy ==
Przhevalsky died of typhus not long before the beginning of his fifth journey, at Karakol on the shore of Issyk Kul in present-day Kyrgyzstan. He contracted typhoid from the Chu River, which was acknowledged as being infected with the disease. The Tsar immediately changed the name of the town to Przhevalsk, although it has since been changed back (1924). There are monuments to him, and a museum about his life and work there in Karakol. In 1892, a monument was erected to him in the Alexander Garden in St. Petersburg.

In 1891, the Russian Geographical Society established a prize in his honor. the following year they created a large Przhevalsky silver medal to be awarded to exemplary explorers. In 1946, they established a Gold Medal to be awarded in his honor.

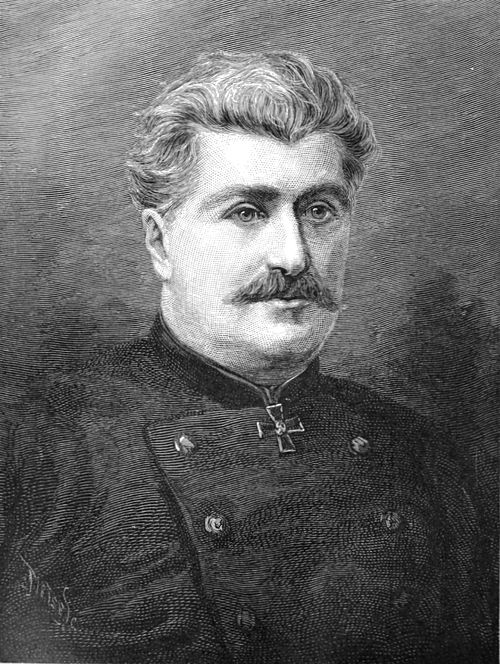
Sketch of Nikolay Przhevalsky in Popular Science Monthly, Volume 30, January 1887

Less than a year after his premature death, Mikhail Pevtsov succeeded Przhevalsky at the head of his expedition into the remote parts of Central Asia. In addition, Przhevalsky's work inspired the career of Pyotr Kozlov who also followed in his footsteps.

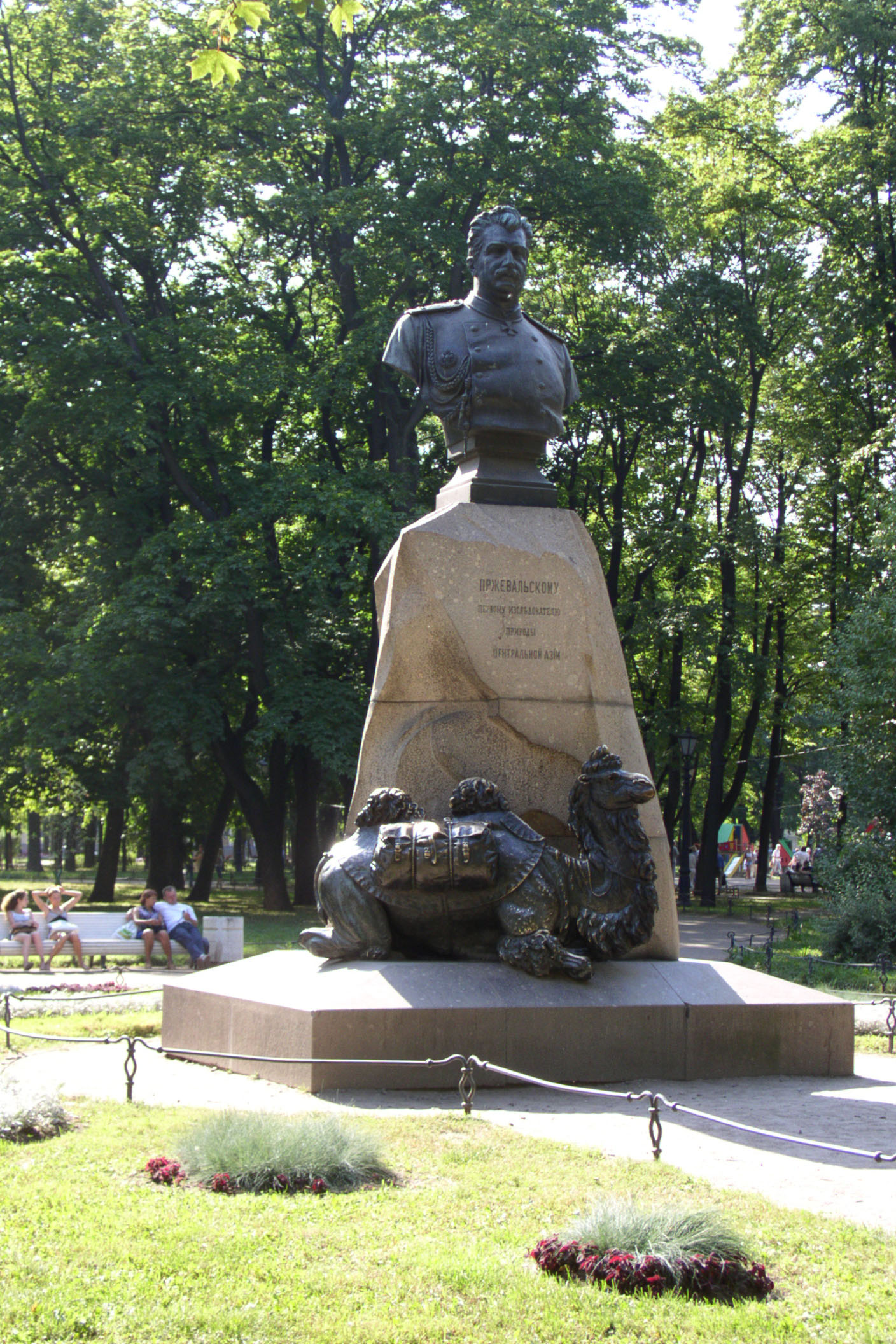
Monument to Nikolay Przhevalsky in the Alexander Garden, Saint Petersburg

The settlement of Przhevalskoye, Smolensk Oblast, Russia is also named after Przhevalsky. He had lived in this village, then called Sloboda, from 1881 to 1887 (except for the period of his travels) and he apparently loved it. The village was renamed after him in 1964. There is a memorial complex there that includes the old and new houses of Nikolay Przhevalsky, his bust, pond, garden, birch alleys, and khatka (a lodge, watch-house).

Przhevalsky is commemorated by more than eighty eponymic plant species, including Przewalskia, a genus of flowering plants from Asia, belonging to the family Solanaceae.

Przhevalsky is honoured in the scientific names of five species of lizards: Alsophylax przewalskii, Eremias przewalskii, Phrynocephalus przewalskii, Scincella przewalskii, and Teratoscincus przewalskii. Other eponymous animals include Przevalski's nuthatch, Przewalsky's gecko, Przewalski's finch, Przewalski's gerbil, Przewalski's steppe lemming, and Przewalski's parrotbill.

== Accusations of imperialism and prejudice ==
According to Detlef Brennecke, Przevalsky exhibited an arrogance towards the locals that led to their hostility. Canadian scholar David Schimmelpenninck Van Der Oye called Przhevalsky bellicose and found Przhevalsky's books on Central Asia featured his disdain for the "Oriental"— particularly Chinese civilization. Przhevalsky portrayed Chinese people as cowardly, dirty and lazy. He purportedly argued that imperial China's hold on its northern territories, in particular Xinjiang and Mongolia, was tenuous and uncertain, and Przhevalsky openly called for Russia's annexation of bits and pieces of China's territory. Przhevalsky said one should explore Asia "with a carbine in one hand, a whip in the other."

Przhevalsky, as well as other contemporary explorers including Sven Hedin, Francis Younghusband, and Aurel Stein, were active players in the British–Russian struggle for influence in Central Asia, the so-called Great Game.

Here you can penetrate anywhere, only not with the Gospels under your arm, but with money in your pocket, a carbine in one hand and a whip in the other. Europeans must use these to come and bear away in the name of civilisation all these dregs of the human race. A thousand of our soldiers would be enough to subdue all Asia from Lake Baykal to the Himalayas....Here the exploits of Cortez can still be repeated.

— Nikolay Przhevalsky on Asia

Przhevalsky's prejudice extended to non-Chinese Asians as well, describing the Tajik ruler Yaqub Beg in a letter as follows, "Yakub Beg is the same shit as all feckless Asiatics. The Kashgarian empire isn't worth a kopek." Przhevalsky also claimed Yaqub was "Nothing more than a political impostor," and also disdained the Muslim subjects of Yaqub Beg in Kashgar, claiming that they "constantly cursed their government and expressed their desire to become Russian subjects. [...] The savage Asiatic clearly understands Russian power is the guarantee for prosperity." These statements were made in a report in which Przhevalsky recommended that Russian troops occupy the Kashgarian emirate, but the Russian government took no action, and China recaptured Kashgar. Przhevalsky's dreams of taking land from China did not materialize.

Przhevalsky not only disdained Chinese ethnic groups, he also viewed the eight million non-Chinese peoples of Tibet, Turkestan, and Mongolia as uncivilized, evolutionarily backwards people who needed to be freed from Chinese rule.

Przhevalsky proposed Russia provoke rebellions of the Buddhist and Muslim peoples in these areas of China against the Chinese regime, start a war with China, and, with a small number of Russian troops, wrest control of Turkestan from China.

== Personal life ==
Przhevalsky is known to have had a personal relationship with Tasya Nuromskaya, whom he met in Smolensk. According to one legend, during their last meeting Nuromskaya cut off her braid and gave it to him, saying that the braid would travel with him until their marriage. She died of a sunstroke while Przhevalsky was on an expedition.

Another woman in Przhevalsky's life was a mysterious young lady whose portrait, along with a fragment of poetry, was found in Przhevalsky's album. In the poem, she asks him to stay with her and not to go to Tibet, to which he responded in his diary: "I will never betray the ideal, to which is dedicated all of my life. As soon as I write everything necessary, I will return to the desert...where I will be much happier than in the gilded salons that can be acquired by marriage".

== Myth ==
There is an urban legend that Joseph Stalin was an illegitimate son of Nikolay Przhevalsky. The legend is based on the facial similarity of both men, Stalin's official birthdate controversy (claims that he was born on 6 December 1878 instead of 21 December 1879), and that the late Stalin era saw a resurrection of interest to the personality of Przhevalsky. Numerous books and monographs were published in the Soviet Union and satellite Communist countries, which was a rare occurrence in regard to the Tsarist-era scientists, and Soviet encyclopedias portrayed Przhevalsky in sharp similarity to Stalin, which was rumored that in such a discrete manner Stalin was paying a homage to his alleged biological father. M. Khachaturova, a Tbilisi resident, who happened to know an unnamed old lady, the original bearer of the secret, was considered to be a whistleblower of the myth about Stalin's mother's alleged promiscuity. Przhevalsky's diary, if it ever existed, was rumored to disappear from archives during the early days of Stalin's ascent to power as the Communist party career, especially in its highest echelon, was troublesome for the noble blood people, who claimed a hoi polloi origin. There were unsubstantiated claims that certain 1881 paycheck ledger contained brief notes on money transfer from Przhevalsky to Stalin's mother; however, Przhevalsky's visits to Georgia are not recorded, and G. Egnatashvili, a family friend of the Jughashvilis, did not recollect anything which could possibly substantiate those claims. During the Stalin era, any talk concerning his ancestry and childhood was a public taboo; the ferocity, with which the legend was debunked after the Stalin's death with the entire monographs written in order to disprove the myth up until the 2010s, also was considered by some as a further proof of veracity of the Przhevalsky's alleged one-night-stand theory. A humorously developed version of this legend appears in The Life and Extraordinary Adventures of Private Ivan Chonkin (Book Three) by Vladimir Voinovich.

== Works ==
- General N. M. Prjevalsky (1887). "On new Species of Central-Asian Birds". The Ibis. 5. Translated by E. Delmar Morgan – via Internet Archive.

== Film ==
- A 1951 Soviet drama film is dedicated to Przhevalsky's life and work.
