= List of reptiles of Pakistan =

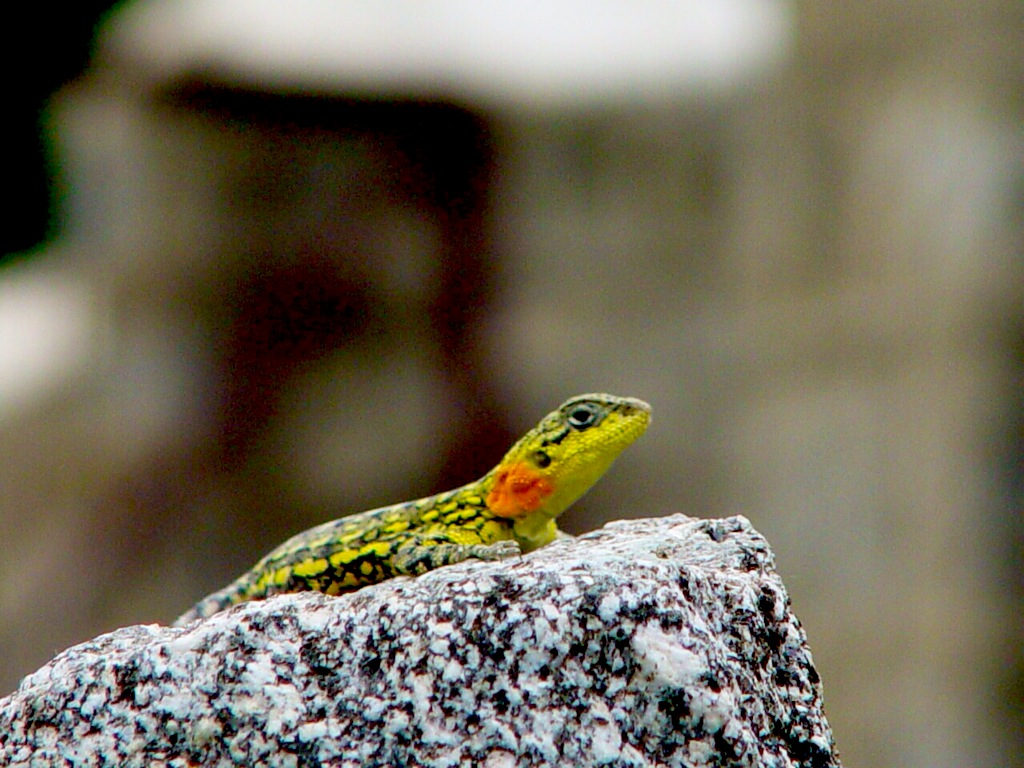
Paralaudakia himalayana in Gilgit.

There are around 170 species of reptiles living in Pakistan.

== Order Crocodilia ==
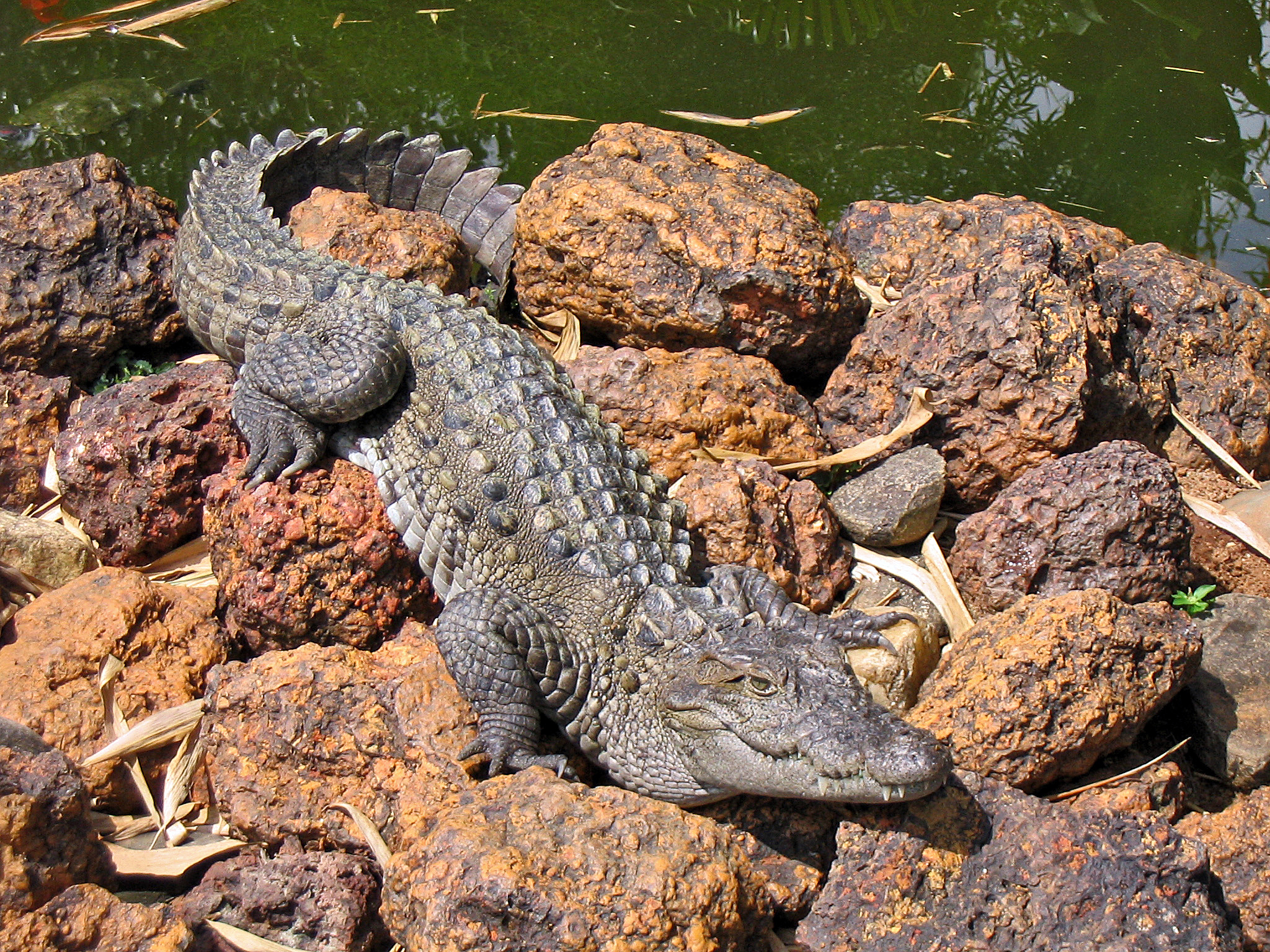
The mugger crocodile is the national reptile of Pakistan

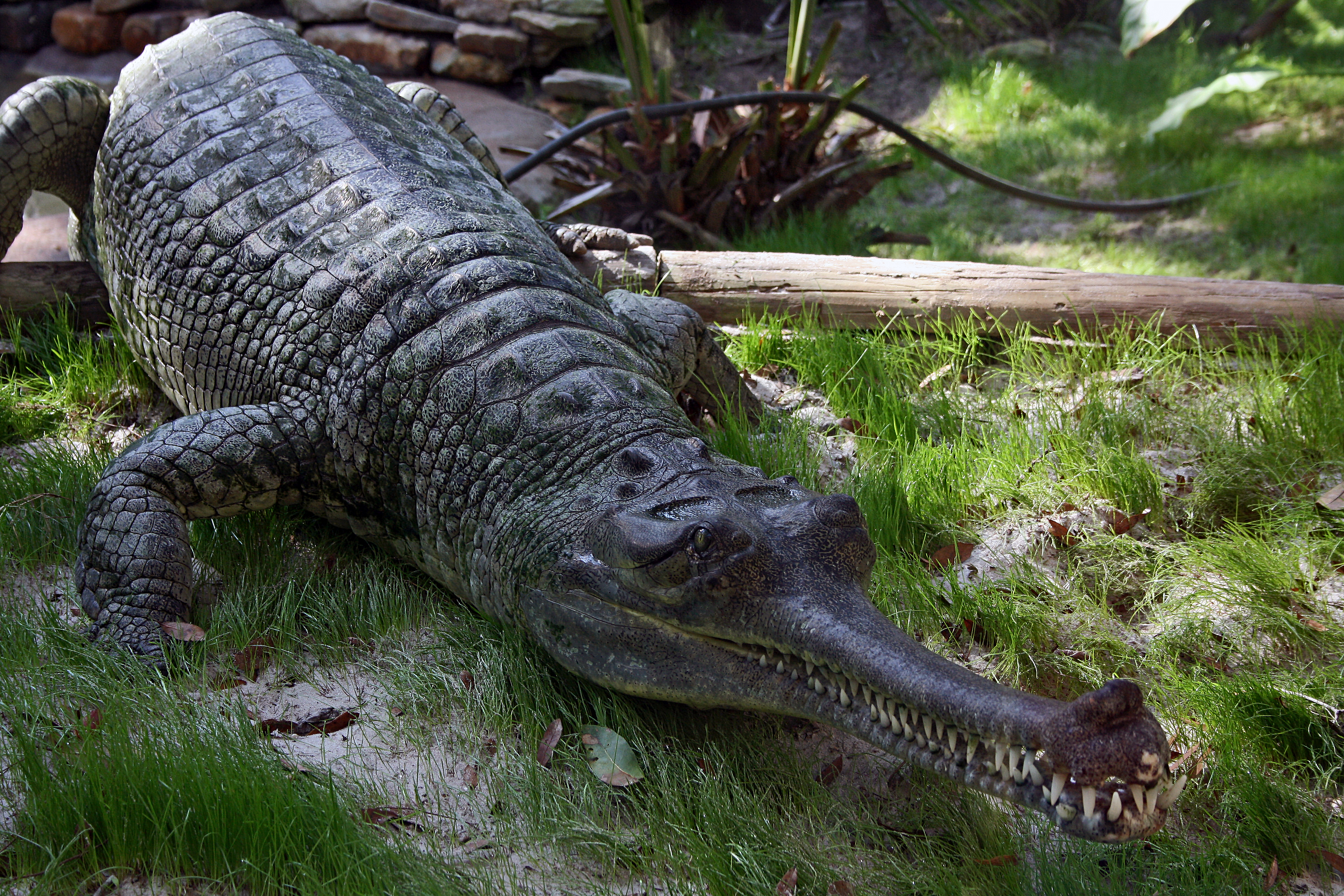
The gharial was found along the banks of the Indus River, for about 22 years it was thought to have gone extinct but was recently spotted in the Sutlej.

There are only two species found in Pakistan.

- Family Crocodylidae (crocodiles) - 1 species
  - Crocodylus palustris (mugger crocodile, Indian crocodile, Indus crocodile or marsh crocodile) - national reptile
- Family Gavialidae (gharials) - 1 species
  - Gavialis gangeticus (Indian gavial or gharial)

== Order Squamata ==
Around 153 species of Squamata are found in Pakistan.

=== Suborder Lacertilia ===
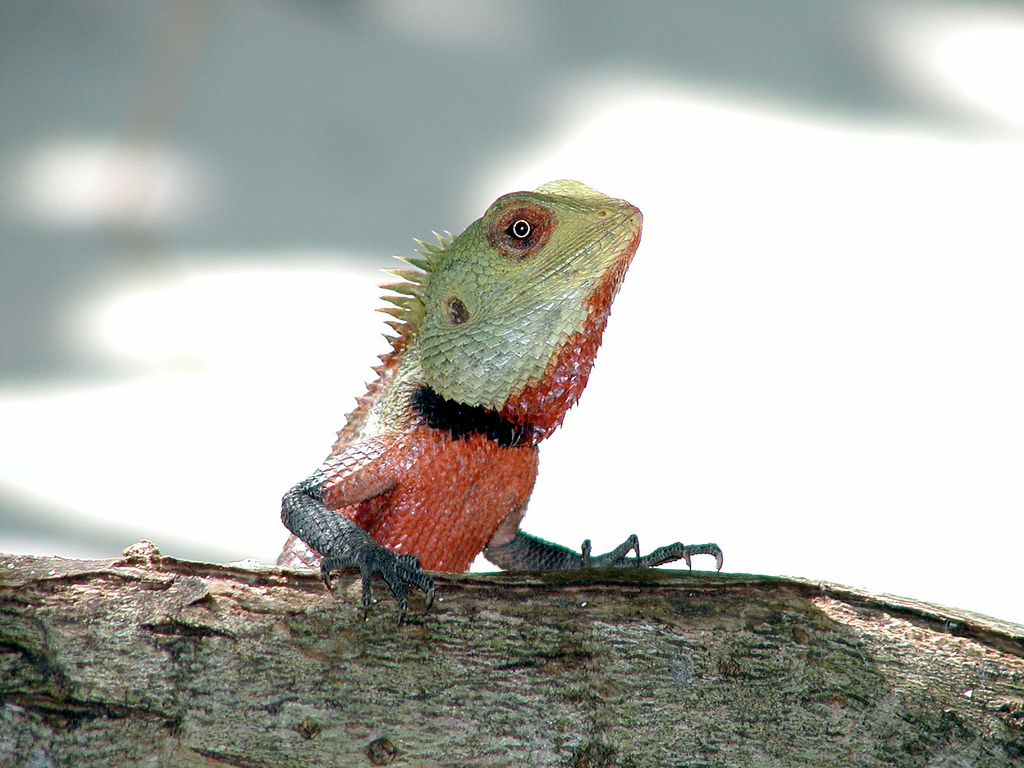
A male Oriental garden lizard

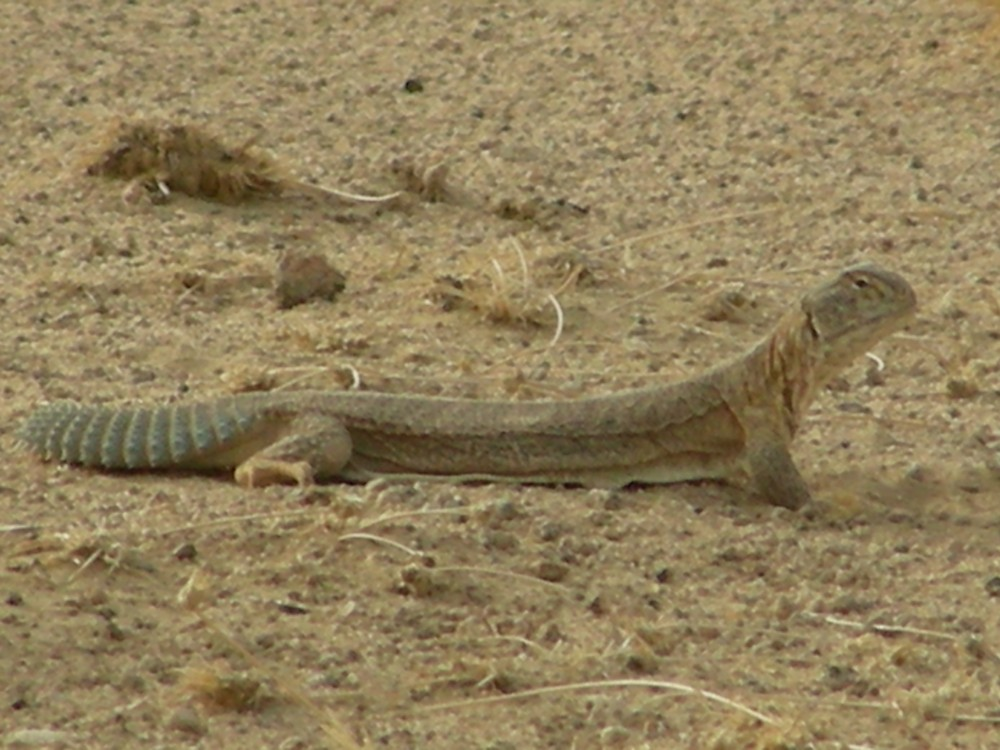
Hardwick's spiny-tailed lizard

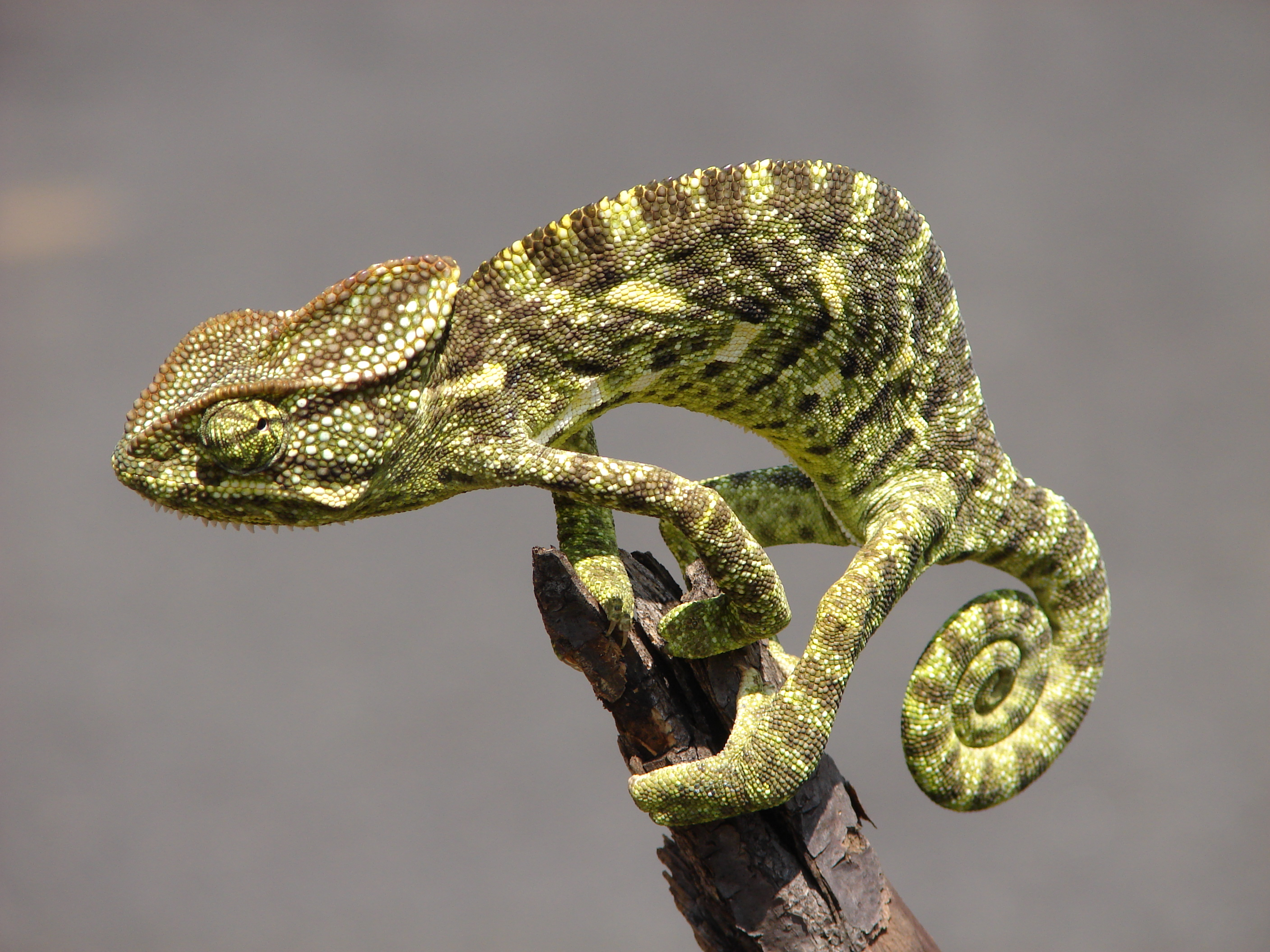
Ceylon chameleon

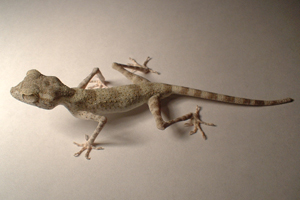
Persian spider gecko

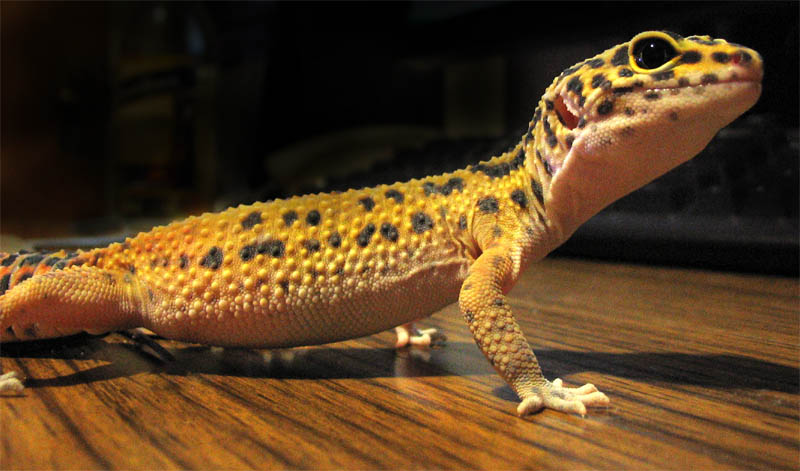
Leopard gecko

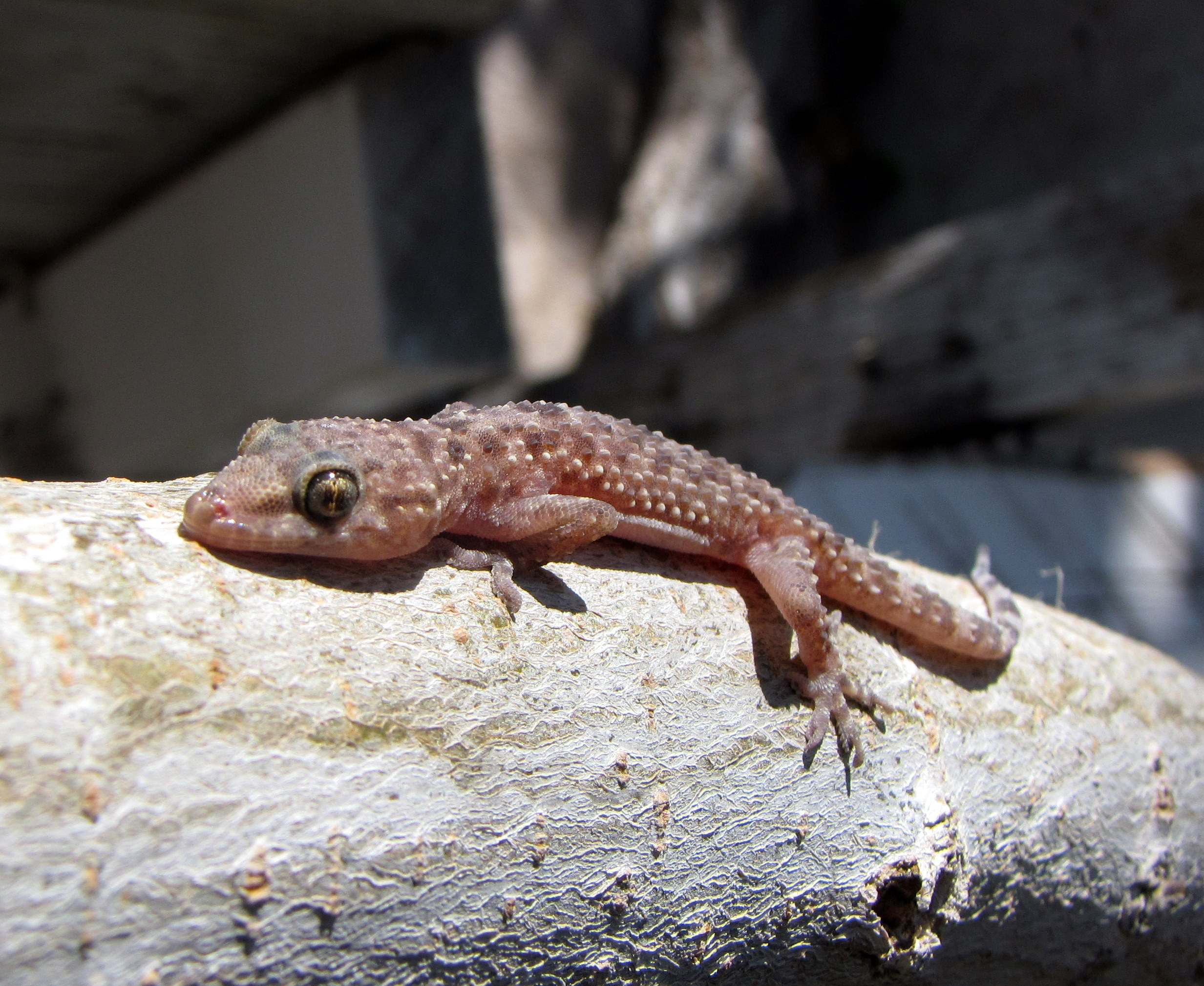
Mediterranean house gecko

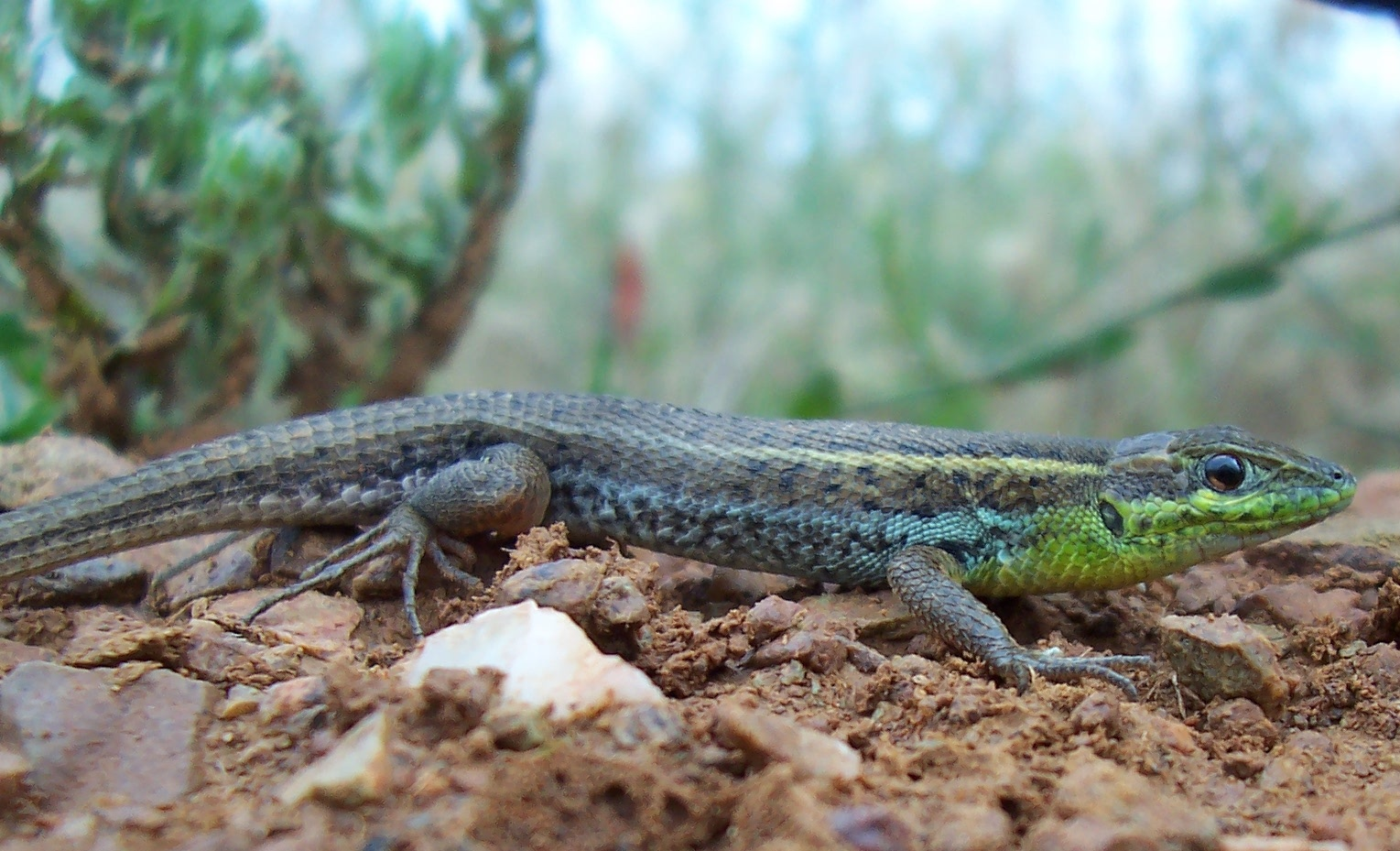
Snake-eyed lizard

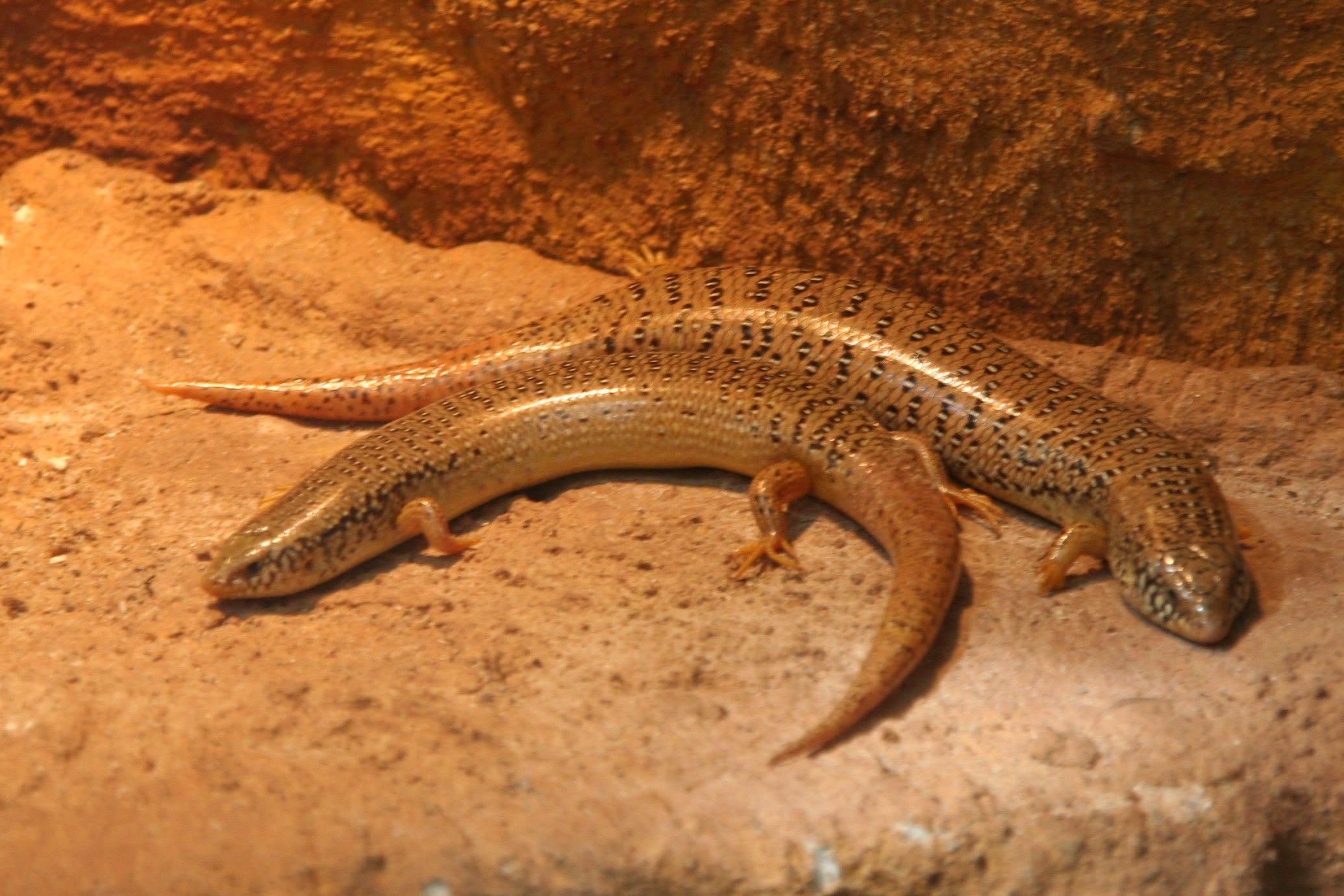
Ocellated skink

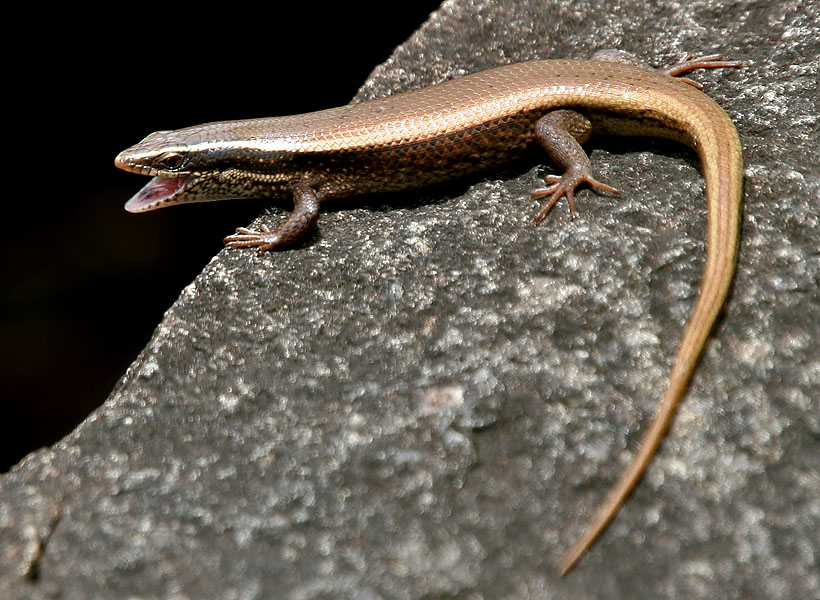
Bronze mabuya

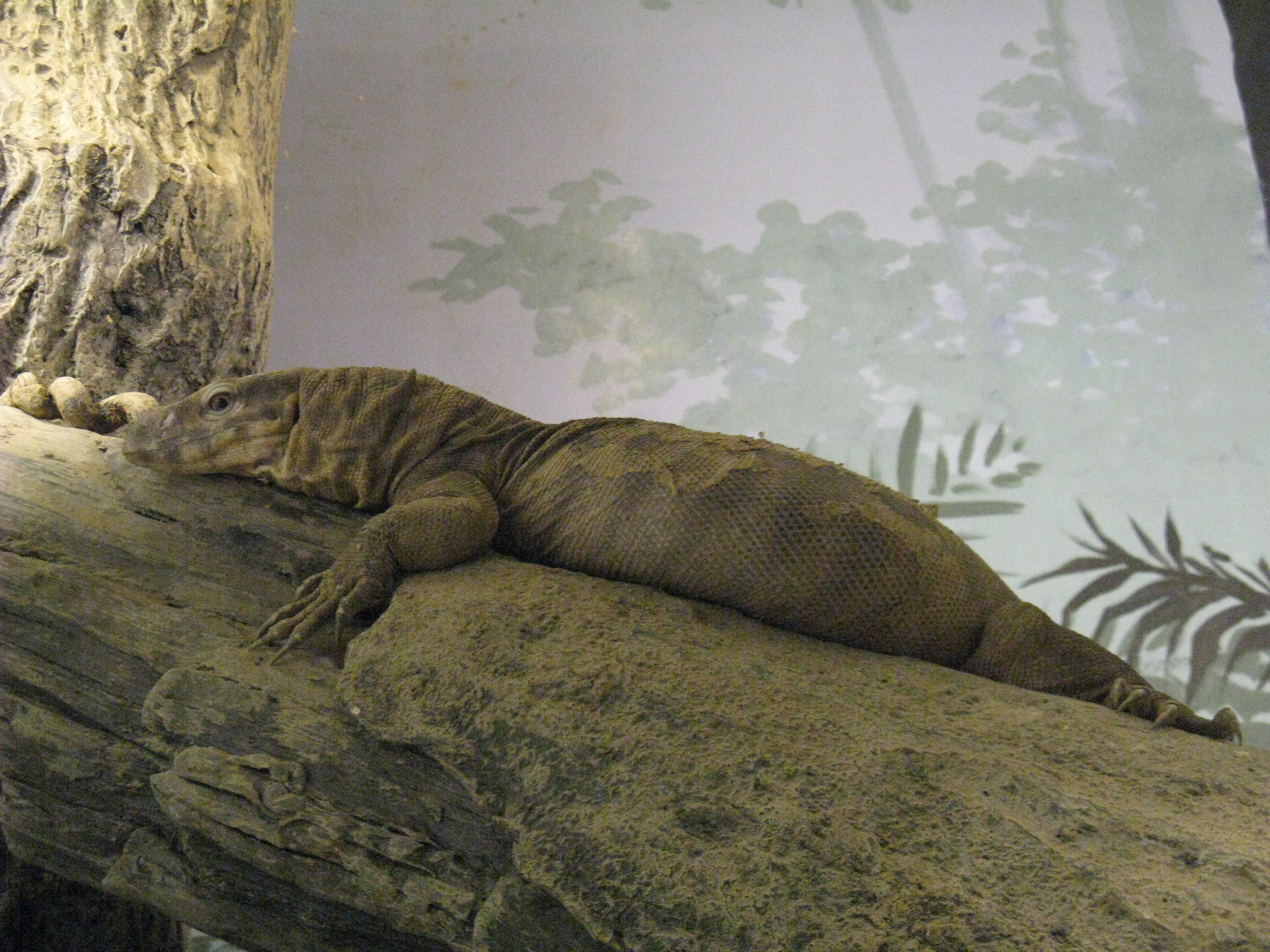
Yellow monitor

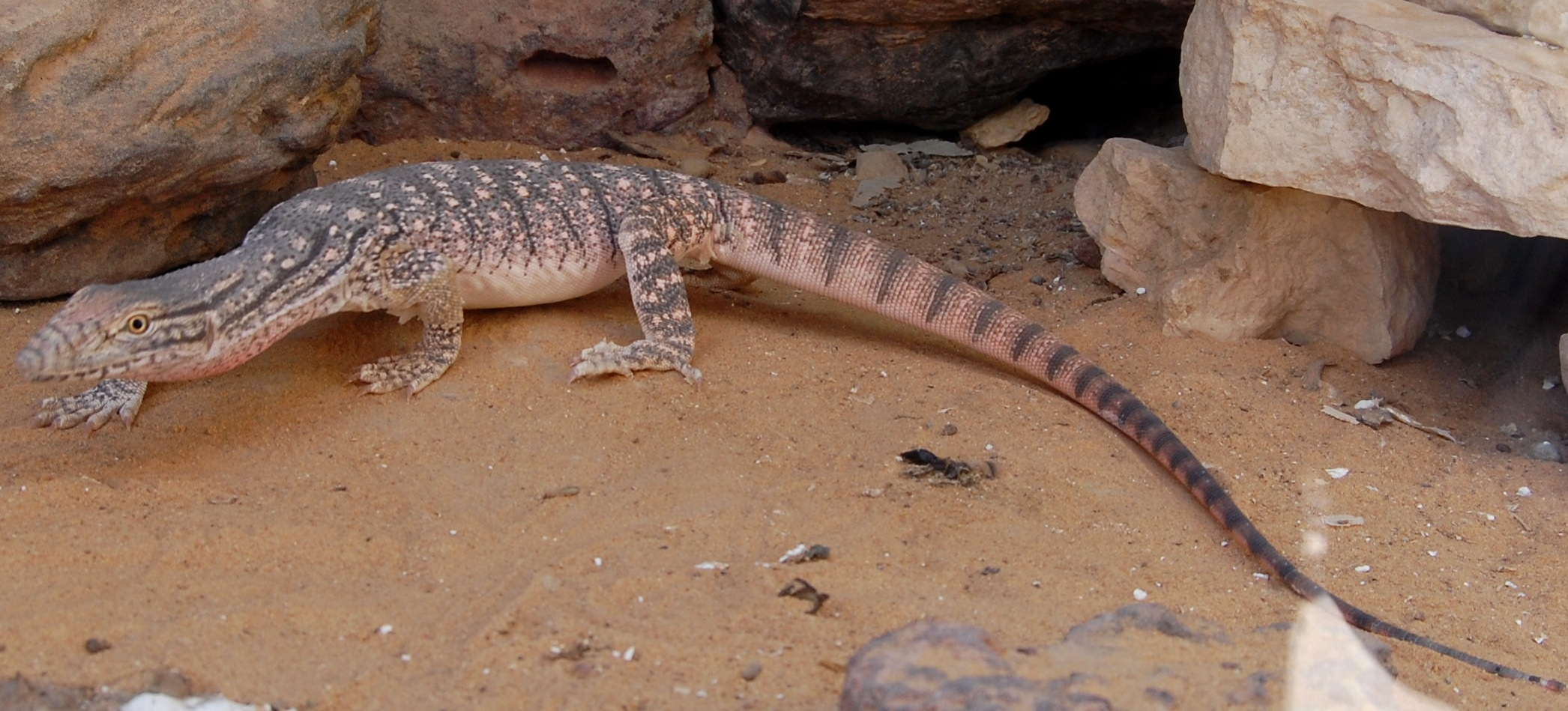
Thar desert monitor

There are 86 species of Lacertilia (lizards and relatives) in Pakistan.

- Family Agamidae (agamas) - 22 species
  - Brachysaura minor (Hardwicke's bloodsucker)
  - Calotes versicolor (Oriental garden lizard, eastern garden lizard or changeable lizard)
  - Japalura kumaonensis (Kumaon mountain lizard)
  - Paralaudakia badakhshana (Badakhshana rock agama)
  - Paralaudakia caucasia (Caucasian agama)
  - Paralaudakia himalayana (Himalayan agama)
  - Laudakia agrorensis (Agror agama)
  - Laudakia melanura (black agama)
  - Laudakia fusca (yellow-headed rock agama)
  - Laudakia nupta (large-scaled rock agama) - 2 subspecies
    - Laudakia n. fusca
    - Laudakia n. nupta
  - Laudakia tuberculata (Kashmir rock agama)
  - Phrynocephalus clarkorum (Clark's toad-headed agama)
  - Phrynocephalus euptilopus (Alcock's toad-headed agama)
  - Phrynocephalus luteoguttatus (yellow-speckled toad-headed agama)
  - Phrynocephalus maculatus (blacktail toadhead agama)
  - Phrynocephalus ornatus (ornate toadhead agama)
  - Phrynocephalus scutellatus (gray toadhead agama)
  - Trapelus agilis pakistanensis (brilliant ground agama)
  - Trapelus rubrigularis (red-throated agama)
  - Trapelus ruderatus (horn-scaled agama or Baluch ground agama)
  - Uromastyx asmussi (Iranian mastigure)
  - Uromastyx hardwickii (Hardwick's spiny-tailed lizard or Indian spiny-tailed lizard)
- Family Chamaeleonidae (chameleons) - 1 species
  - Chamaeleo zeylanicus (Indian chameleon or Ceylon chameleon)
- Family Gekkonidae (eyelid and lidless geckoes) - 33 species
  - Agamura femoralis or Rhinogecko femoralis (De Witte's gecko or sharp-tailed spider gecko)
  - Agamura persica persica (Persian spider gecko)
  - Bunopus tuberculatus (Baluch rock gecko)
  - Crossobamon eversmanni (Baluchistan sand gecko or comb-toed gecko) - 2 subspecies
    - Crossobamon e. eversmanni or Crossobamon maynardi
    - Crossobamon e. lumsdenii
  - Crossobamon orientalis (Sind gecko)
  - Cyrtodactylus walli (Chitral gecko or Swat stone gecko)
  - Cyrtopodium agamuroides (Nikolsky spider gecko)
  - Cyrtopodium baturensis (Batura thin-toed gecko or Batura gecko)
  - Cyrtopodium dattanensis (Khan's bow-fingered gecko or Hazara gecko)
  - Cyrtopodium fortmunroi (Fort Munro gecko)
  - Cyrtopodium indusoani (Soan Sakaser gecko)
  - Cyrtopodium kachhensis (Kutch gecko) - 2 subspecies
    - Cyrtopodium k. ingoldbyi (Ingoldby's stone gecko)
    - Cyrtopodium k. kachhensis (warty rock gecko)
  - Cyrtopodium mintoni (Minton's gecko)
  - Cyrtopodium montiumsalsorum (Salt Range rock gecko)
  - Cyrtopodium rhodocaudus (red-tailed gecko)
  - Cyrtopodium rohtasfortai (Rohtas Fort gecko)
  - Cyrtopodium scaber (keeled rock gecko)
  - Cyrtopodium watsoni (Quetta rock gecko)
  - Eublepharis macularius (leopard gecko)
  - Hemidactylus brookii brookii (Brook's house gecko or spotted Indian house gecko)
  - Hemidactylus flaviviridis (yellow-bellied house gecko)
  - Hemidactylus frenatus (Pacific house gecko or South Asian waif gecko)
  - Hemidactylus imbricatus (carrot-tail viper gecko)
  - Hemidactylus leschenaultii (Leschenault's leaf-toed gecko or bark gecko)
  - Hemidactylus persicus (Persian leaf-toed gecko)
  - Hemidactylus triedrus triedus (termite hill gecko or blotched house gecko)
  - Hemidactylus turcicus turcicus (Mediterranean house gecko)
  - Microgecko depressus (low lying gecko)
  - Microgecko helenae (banded dwarf gecko)
  - Ptyodactylus homolepis (Pakistan fan-fingered gecko) - 2 subspecies
    - Ptyodactylus h. homolepis
    - Ptyodactylus h. socotranus
  - Teratoscincus microlepis (small-scaled wonder gecko or Baluch plate-tailed gecko)
  - Teratoscincus scincus (Turkestan plate-tailed gecko or common wonder gecko or frog-eyed gecko)
  - Tropiocolotes persica (Persian sand gecko or Persian pygmy gecko)
- Family Lacertidae (sand lizards, wall lizards and true lizards) - 12 species
  - Acanthodactylus cantoris (Indian fringe-fingered lizard) - 2 subspecies
    - Acanthodactylus c. blanfordii (Mekran fringe-fingered lizard)
    - Acanthodactylus c. cantoris (Indian fringe-fingered lizard)
  - Acanthodactylus micropholis (yellow-tailed sand lizard)
  - Eremias acutirostris (reticulate desert lacerta)
  - Eremias fasciata (yellow-headed desert lacerta)
  - Eremias scripta (Caspian desert lacerta)
  - Eremias velox persica (Persian Steppe lacerta)
  - Mesalina brevirostris (short-nosed desert lacerta)
  - Mesalina guttulata (small-spotted lizard or long-tailed desert lacerta)
  - Ophisops elegans (elegant snake-eyed lizard) - 2 subspecies
    - Ophisops e. blanfordi (Blanfords snake-eyed lizard)
    - Ophisops e. elegans (elegant snake-eyed lizard)
  - Ophisops jerdonii (Jerdon's snake-eyed lizard or Punjab snake-eyed lizard)
  - Ophisops microlepis (Indian snake-eyed lizard)
  - Scapteira aporosceles (Chagai desert lacerta)
- Family Scincidae (skinks) - 15 species
  - Ablepharus grayanus (minor snake-eyed skink)
  - Ablepharus pannonicus (Asian snake-eyed skink)
  - Chalcides ocellatus (ocellated skink)
  - Eumeces schneiderii zarudnyi (Schneider's skink, Berber skink or Zarudny's skink)
  - Eurylepis indothalensis (Thal skink)
  - Eurylepis taeniolata (alpine Punjab skink or yellow-bellied mole skink)
  - Eutropis dissimilis (striped grass mabuya or striped grass skink)
  - Eutropis macularia (bronze mabuya, bronze grass skink)
  - Ophiomorus blanfordii (Makran sand swimmer)
  - Ophiomorus brevipes (short-toed sand swimmer)
  - Ophiomorus raithmai (Indus sand swimmer)
  - Ophiomorus tridactylus (three-toed snake skink or Indian sandswimmer)
  - Scincella ladacensis - 2 subspecies
    - Scincella l. ladacensis (Ladak ground skink)
    - Scincella l. himalayana (Himalayan ground skink)
- Family Varanidae (monitor lizards) - 3 species
  - Varanus bengalensis (Bengal monitor)
  - Varanus flavescens (yellow monitor)
  - Varanus griseus - 2 subspecies
    - Varanus g. caspius (eastern desert monitor)
    - Varanus g. koniecznyi (Thar desert monitor)

=== Suborder Serpentes ===
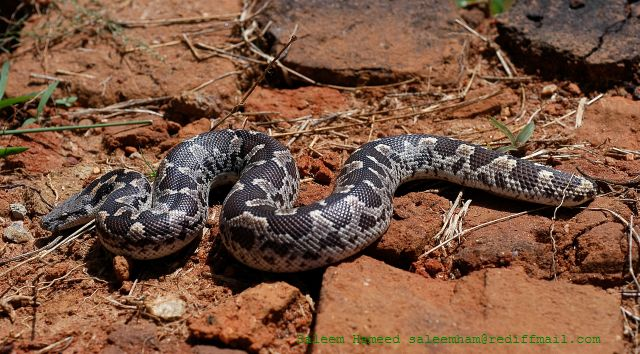
Russell's boa

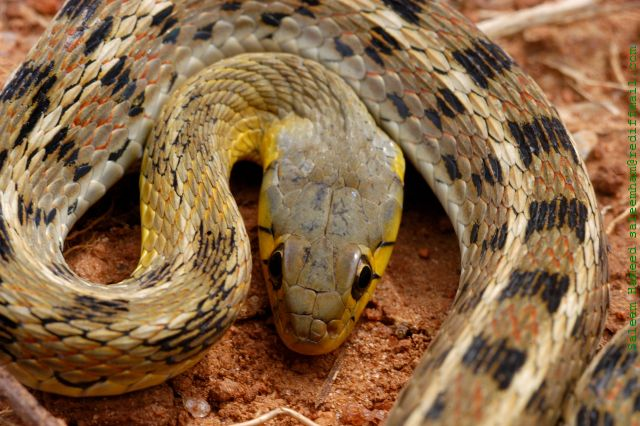
Buff striped keelback

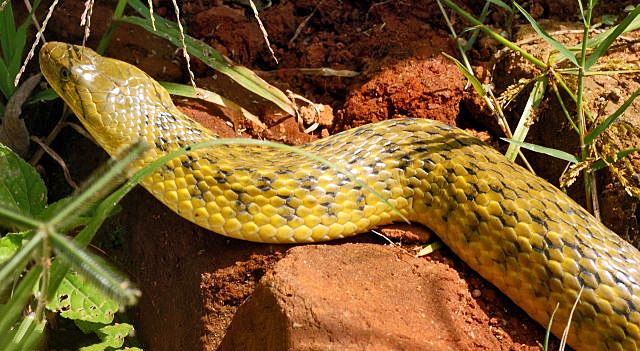
Checkered keelback

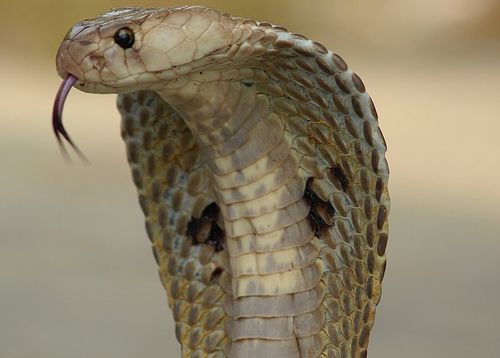
Indian cobra

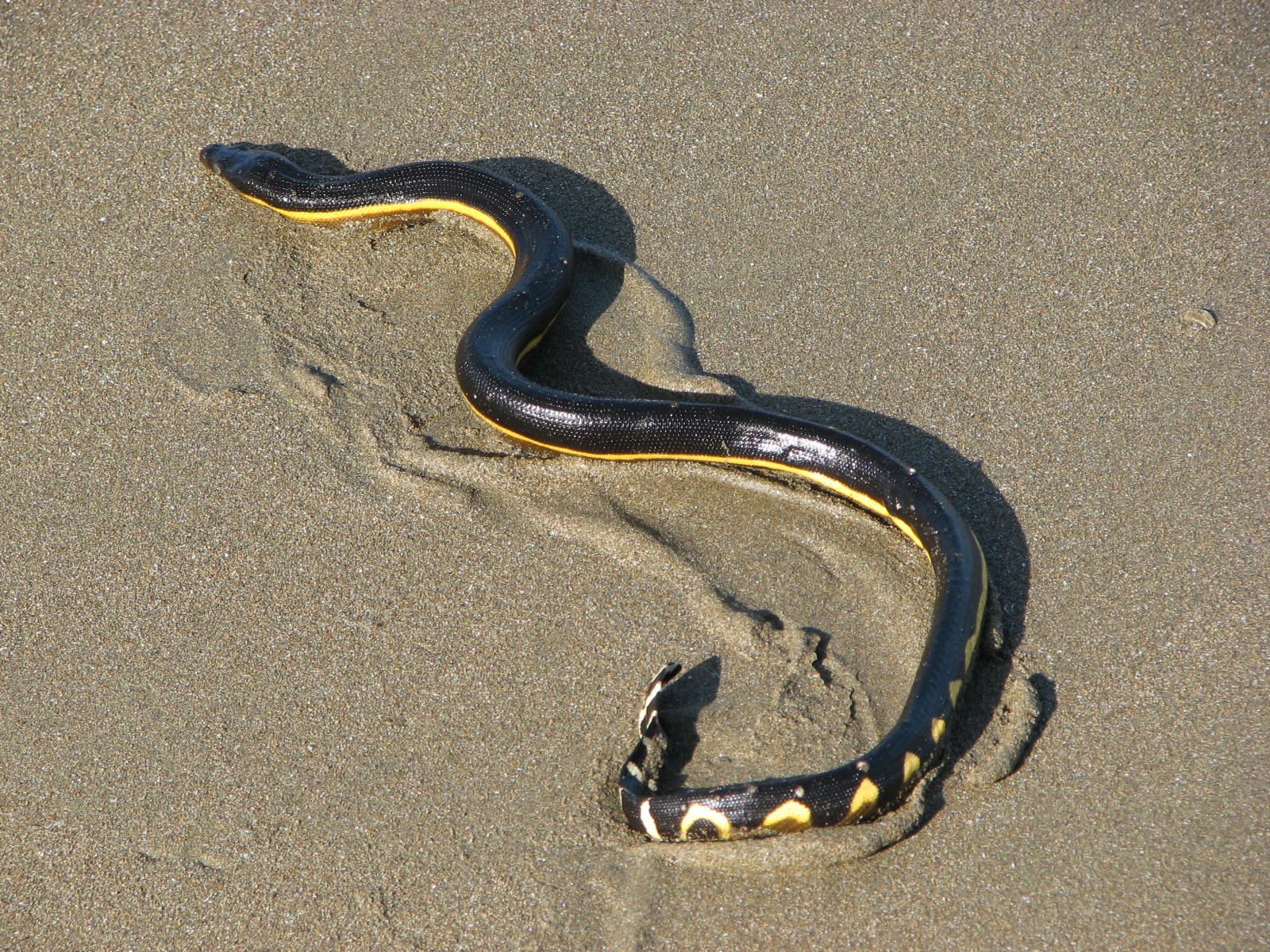
Yellow-bellied sea snake

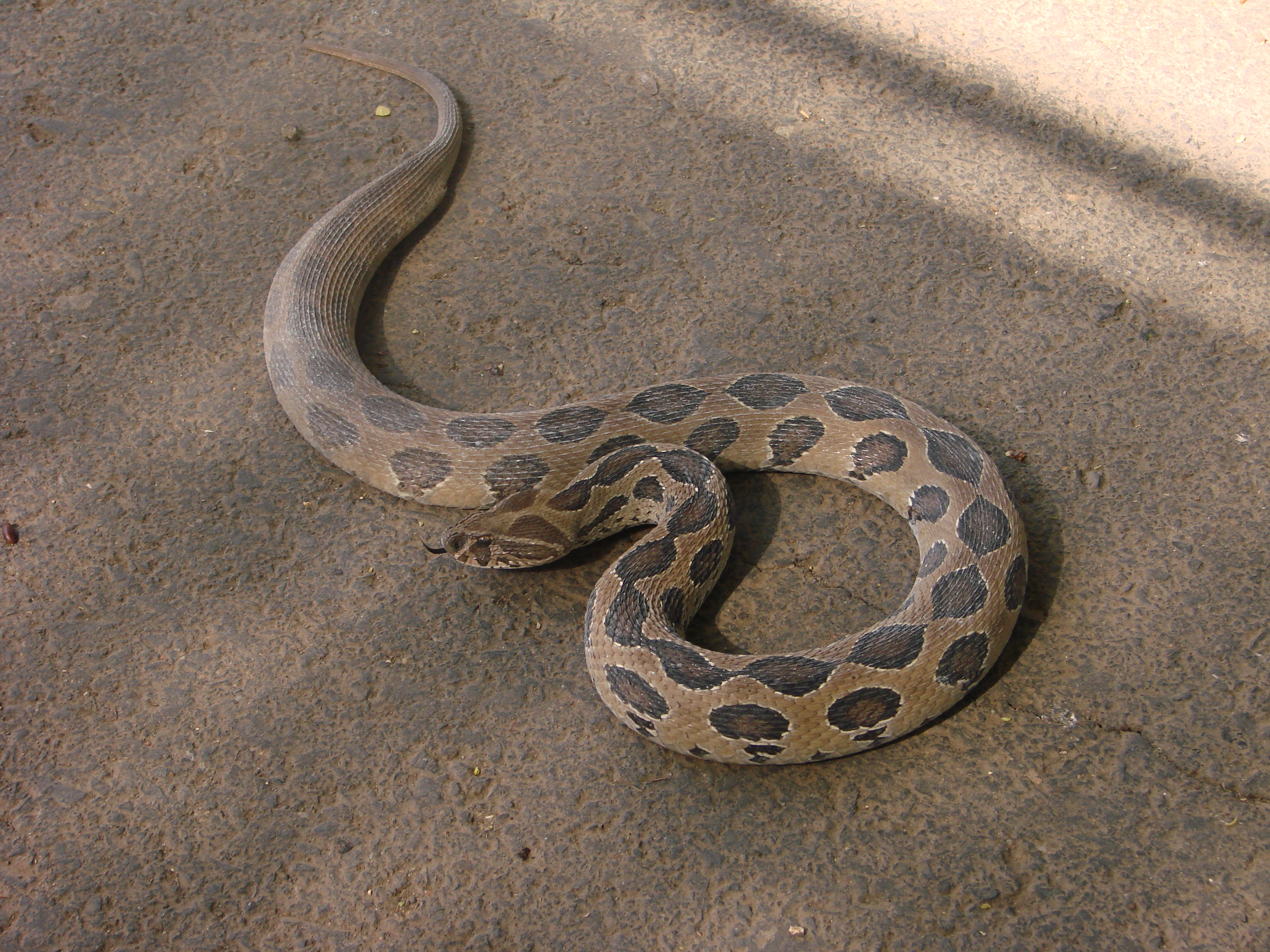
Russell's viper

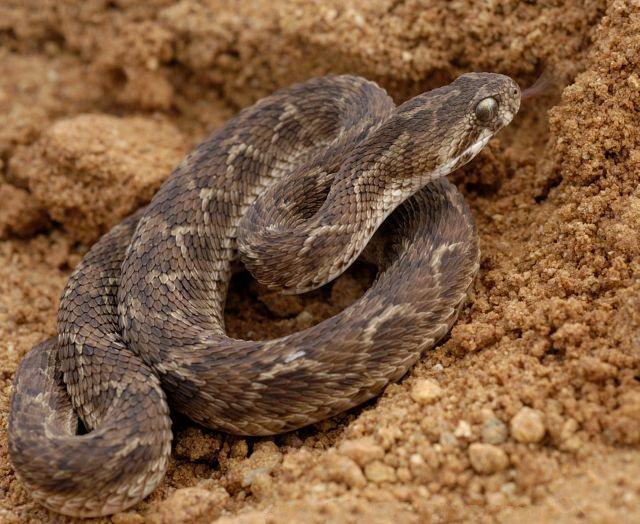
Saw-scaled viper

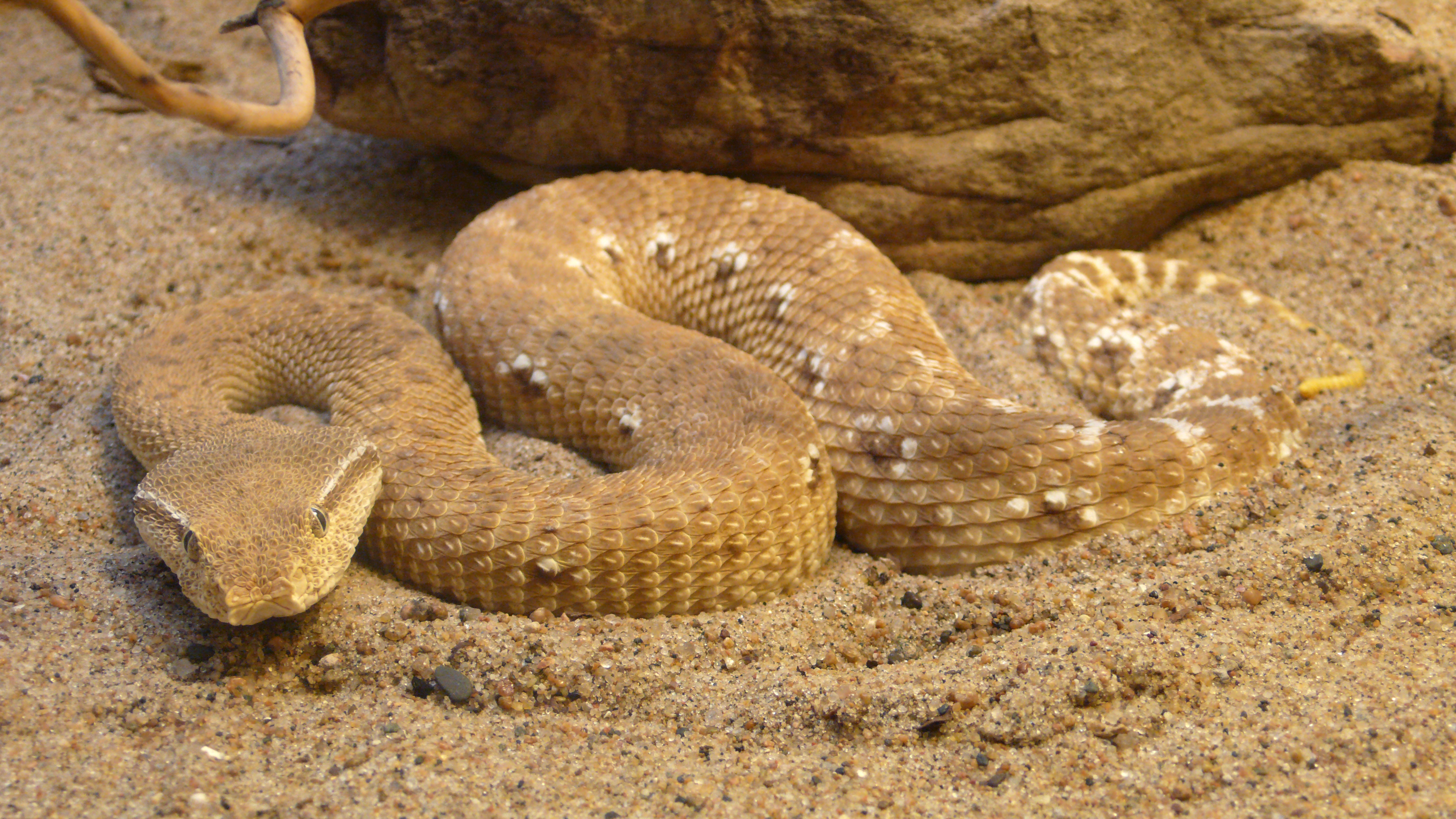
Asian sand viper

There are 71 species and 15 subspecies of Serpentes (snakes) found in Pakistan.

- Family Boidae (boas) - 3 species
  - Eryx johnii (Indian sand boa or red sand boa)
  - Eryx tataricus speciosus (Tartar sand boa)
  - Eryx conicus (rough-scaled sand boa)
- Family Colubridae (colubrids) - 35 species
  - Herpetoreas platyceps
  - Herpetoreas sieboldii
  - Dendrelaphis tristis
  - Coelognathus helena
  - Amphiesma stolata stolata
  - Boiga trigonata – 1 subspecies
    - Boiga t. melanocephala
  - Platyceps plinii
  - Platyceps karelini – 1 subspecies
    - Platyceps k. mintonorum
  - Hemorrhois ravergieri (spotted whip snake)
  - Platyceps rhodorachis – 2 subspecies
    - Coluber r. kashmirensis
    - Coluber r. ladacensis
  - Platyceps ventromaculatus – 2 subspecies
    - Coluber v. bengalensis
    - Coluber v. indusai
  - Enhydris pakistanica
  - Fowlea piscator
  - Fowlea sanctijohannis
  - Fowlea schnurrenbergeri
  - Lycodon aulicus
  - Lycodon bicolor
  - Lycodon striatus
  - Lycodon travancoricus
  - Lytorhynchus maynardi
  - Lytorhynchus paradoxus
  - Lytorhynchus ridgewayi
  - Natrix tessellata
  - Oligodon russelius
  - Oligodon taeniolatus
  - Psammophis condanarus
  - Psammophis leithii
  - Psammophis lineolatus
  - Psammophis schokari
  - Eirenis persicus
  - Ptyas mucosus
  - Sibynophis sagittarius
  - Spalerosophis atriceps
  - Spalerosophis arenarius
  - Spalerosophis diadema – 1 subspecies
    - Spalerosophis d. schirazianus
  - Telescopus rhinopoma
  - Xenochrophis cerasogaster
- Family Elapidae (kraits and cobras) - 4 species
  - Bungarus caeruleus (common krait)
  - Bungarus sindanus (Sind krait) – 1 subspecies
    - Bungarus s. razai (northern Punjab krait)
  - Naja naja (Indian cobra or spectacled cobra)
  - Naja oxiana (Central Asian cobra or Oxus cobra)
  - Ophiophagus hannah (northern king cobra) (vagrant)
- Family Hydrophiidae (sea snakes) - 14 species
  - Astrotia stokesii (Stokes' sea snake)
  - Enhydrina schistosa (beaked sea snake, hook-nosed sea snake, common sea snake or Valakadyn sea snake)
  - Hydrophis caerulescens (dwarf seasnake or many-toothed sea snake)
  - Hydrophis cyanocinctus (annulated sea snake or blue-banded sea snake)
  - Hydrophis fasciatus (striped sea snake)
  - Hydrophis lapemoides (Persian Gulf sea snake)
  - Hydrophis mamillaris (Bombay sea snake)
  - Hydrophis ornatus (ornate reef seasnake)
  - Hydrophis spiralis (Yellow Sea snake)
  - Lapemis curtus (Shaw's sea snake)
  - Microcephalophis cantoris (Cantor's small-headed sea snake)
  - Microcephalophis gracilis (graceful small-headed sea snake or slender sea snake)
  - Pelamis platurus (yellow-bellied sea snake or pelagic sea snake)
  - Praescutata viperina (viperine sea snake)
- Family Leptotyphlopidae (thread snakes) - 2 species
  - Leptotyphlops blanfordii (Blanford's worm snake or Sind thread snake)
  - Leptotyphlops macrorhynchus (long-nosed worm snake or beaked thread snake)
- Family Pythonidae (pythons) - 1 species
  - Python molurus molurus (Indian python, black-tailed python or Sind python)
- Family Typhlopidae (blind snakes) - 4 species
  - Ramphotyphlops braminus (brahminy blind snake)
  - Typhlops ahsanai (Ahsan's blind snake)
  - Typhlops porrectus or Typhlops ductuliformes (slender worm snake)
  - Typhlops madgemintonai – 1 subspecies
    - Typhlops m. shermanai (Sherman's blind snake)
- Family Viperidae (vipers and pit vipers) - 7 species
  - Daboia russelii russelii (daboia or Russell's viper)
  - Echis carinatus (Indian saw-scaled viper) - 3 subspecies
    - Echis c. astolae (Astola saw-scaled viper)
    - Echis c. multisquamatus (multiscale saw-scaled viper)
    - Echis c. sochureki (Sochurek's saw-scaled viper)
  - Eristicophis macmahonii (McMahon's viper, Asian sand viper, leaf-nosed viper)
  - Gloydius himalayanus (Himalayan pit viper)
  - Macrovipera lebetinus (blunt-nosed viper, Lebetine viper, Levant viper) - 3 subspecies
    - Macrovipera lebetina obtusa (west-Asian blunt-nosed viper, Levant blunt-nosed viper)
    - Macrovipera lebetina cernovi (Chernov blunt-nosed viper)
    - Macrovipera lebetina turanica (Turan blunt-nosed viper)
  - Pseudocerastes persicus persicus (Persian horned viper, false horned viper)

== Order Testudines ==
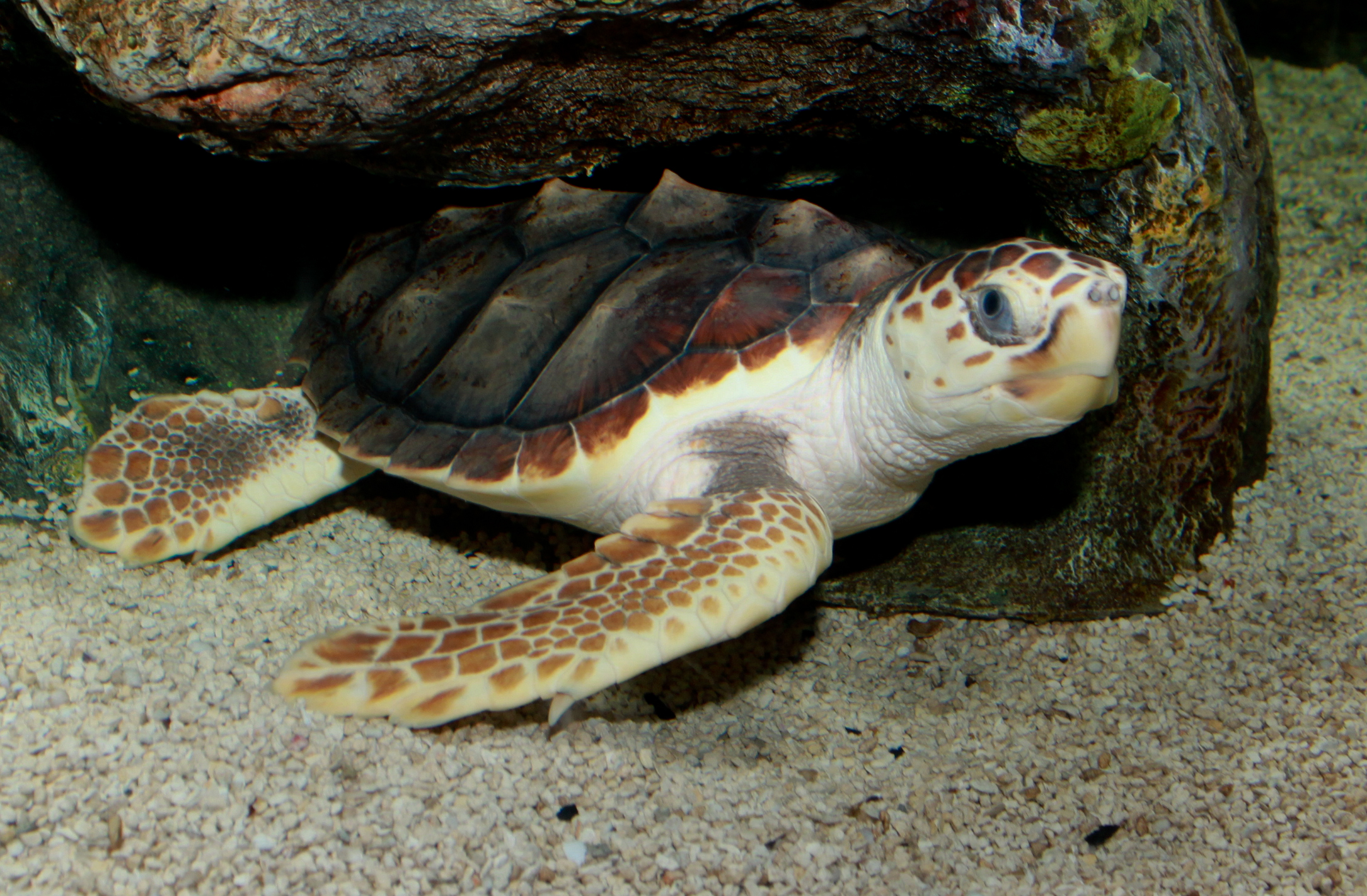
Loggerhead sea turtle

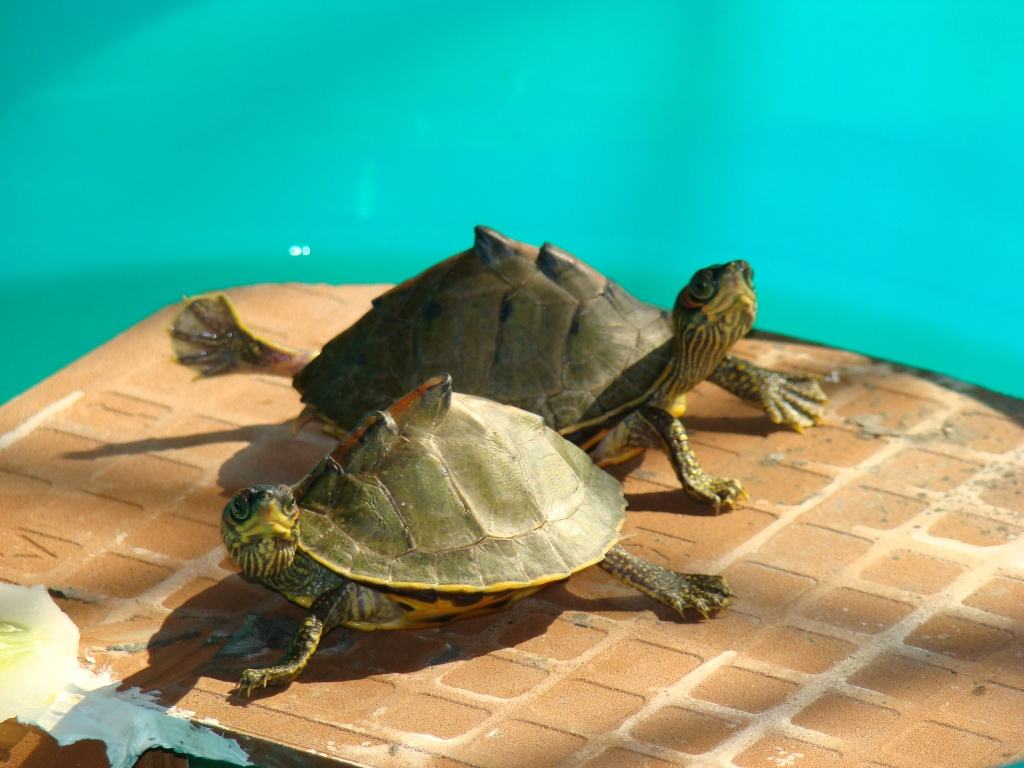
Indian roofed turtle

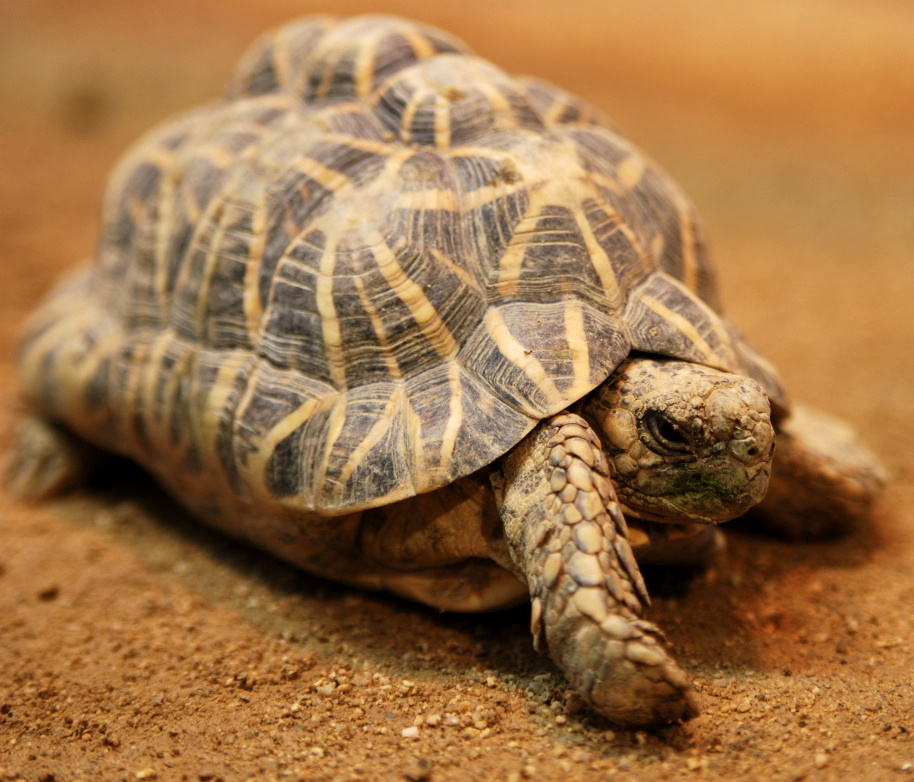
Indian star tortoise

There are 15 species of testudines that represent Pakistan.

- Family Cheloniidae (sea turtles) - 4 species
  - Chelonia mydas (green sea turtle)
  - Caretta caretta (loggerhead sea turtle)
  - Eretmochelys imbricata bissa (hawksbill turtle)
  - Lepidochelys olivacea (olive ridley turtle)
- Family Dermochelyidae (softshell sea turtles) - 1 species
  - Dermochelys coriacea (leatherback sea turtle or leatherback)
- Family Geoemydidae (Asian river turtles, Asian leaf turtles, Asian box turtles and roofed turtles) - 4 species
  - Geoclemys hamiltonii (black pond turtle, spotted pond turtle or Indian spotted turtle)
  - Hardella thurjii (brahminy river turtle or crowned river turtle)
  - Kachuga smithii smithii (brown-roofed turtle)
  - Kachuga tecta (Indian roofed turtle)
  - Melanochelys trijuga (Indian black turtle)
- Family Testudinidae (true tortoises) - 2 species
  - Geochelone elegans (Indian star tortoise)
  - Testudo horsfieldi (Afghan tortoise, Horsfield's tortoise or Central Asian tortoise)
- Family Trionychidae (softshell turtles) - 4 species
  - Aspideretes gangeticus indica (Ganges soft-shelled turtle)
  - Aspideretes hurum (peacock soft-shelled turtle)
  - Chitra indica (narrow-headed soft-shelled turtle)
  - Lissemys punctata andersoni (Indian flap-shelled turtle)
