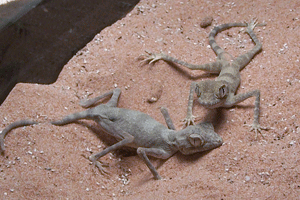
- Agamura persica female digging before laying eggs. Male present above.

Scientific classification
- Kingdom: Animalia
- Phylum: Chordata
- Class: Reptilia
- Order: Squamata
- Suborder: Gekkota
- Family: Gekkonidae
- Subfamily: Gekkoninae
- Genus: Agamura; Blanford, 1874

Species
- 3 species (see text)

= Agamura =

Genus of lizards

Agamura is a genus of geckos.

== Species ==
Three Agamura species are recognized:

- Agamura cruralis (Blanford, 1874)
- Agamura kermanensis Hosseinian-Yousefkhani, Aliabadian, Rastegar-Pouyani, Darvish, Shafiei, & Sehhatisabet, 2018
- Agamura persica (Duméril, 1856) – Persian spider gecko

Geckos of the genus Rhinogekko have sometimes been classified in genus Agamura but the genus is currently considered distinct from the latter. These genera share a number of characteristics: straight to slightly bent toes, weakly tuberculate skin, and long, thin limbs and tail.
