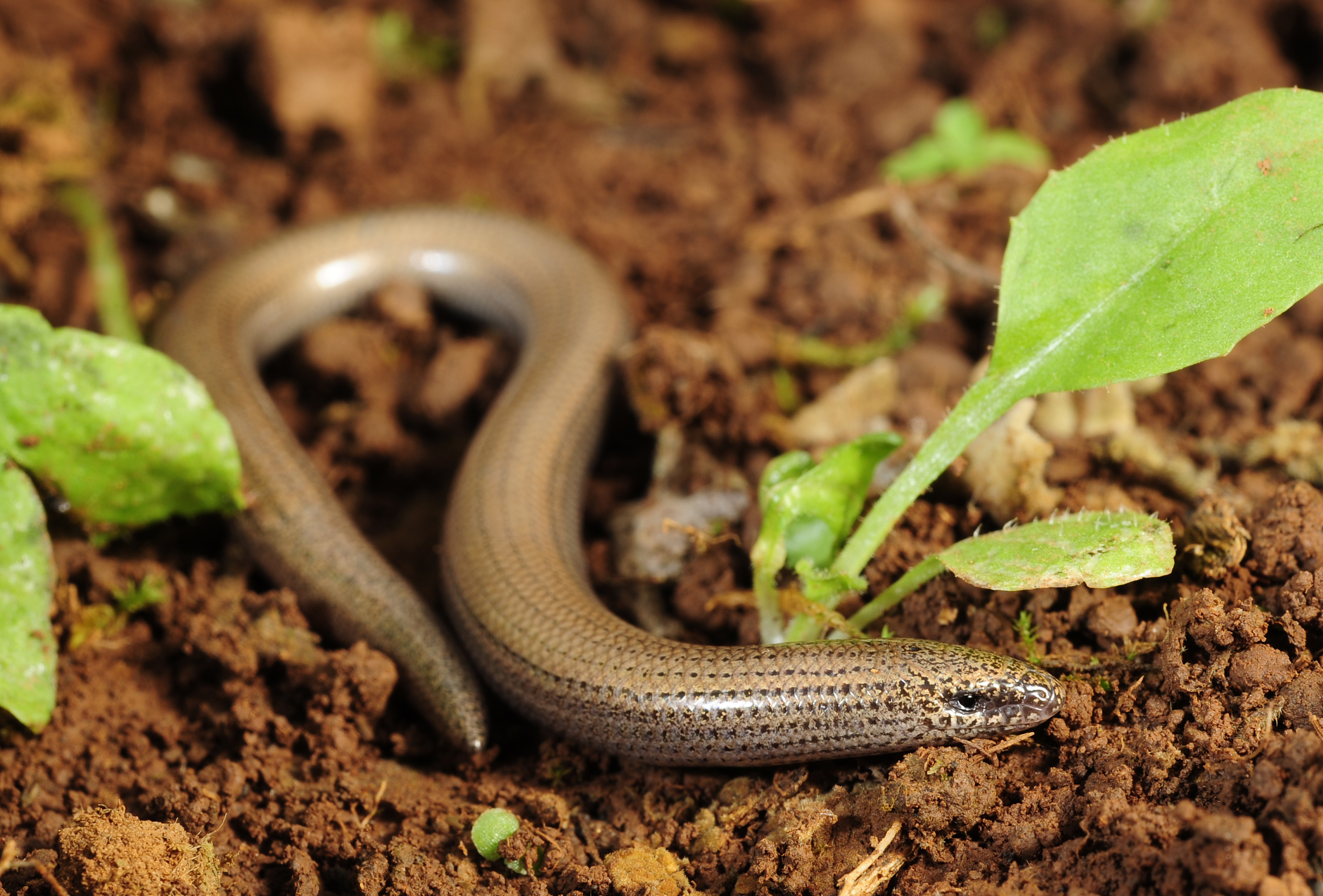
- Ophiomorus punctatissimus

Scientific classification
- Kingdom: Animalia
- Phylum: Chordata
- Class: Reptilia
- Order: Squamata
- Family: Scincidae
- Subfamily: Scincinae
- Genus: Ophiomorus; A.M.C. Duméril & Bibron, 1839

= Ophiomorus =

Genus of lizards

Ophiomorus is a genus of Old World skinks. The limbs are either reduced or absent, depending on the species. They are sometimes known as limbless skinks or snake skinks. Members of the genus live under rocks or in burrows.

== Species ==
The following 12 species are recognized:

- Ophiomorus blanfordii (Blanford, 1879) – Blanford's snake skink
- Ophiomorus brevipes (Blanford, 1874) – short-legged snake skink
- Ophiomorus chernovi S.C. Anderson & Leviton, 1966 – Chernov's snake skink
- Ophiomorus kardesi Kornilios, Kumlutaş, Lymberakis & Ilgaz, 2018
- Ophiomorus latastii Boulenger, 1887 – Latast's snake skink
- Ophiomorus maranjabensis Kazemi, Farhadi Qomi, Kami & S.C. Anderson, 2011 – Maranjab's snake skink
- Ophiomorus nuchalis Nilson & Andrén, 1978 – Nilson's snake skink, plateau snake skink
- Ophiomorus persicus (Steindachner, 1867) – Persian snake skink
- Ophiomorus punctatissimus (Bibron & Bory de Saint-Vincent, 1833) – Greek snake skink
- Ophiomorus raithmai S.C. Anderson & Leviton, 1966 – eastern sand swimmer, the three-fingered sand-fish
- Ophiomorus streeti S.C. Anderson & Leviton, 1966 – Street's snake skink
- Ophiomorus tridactylus (Blyth, 1853) – three-toed snake skink, Indian sand-swimmer
