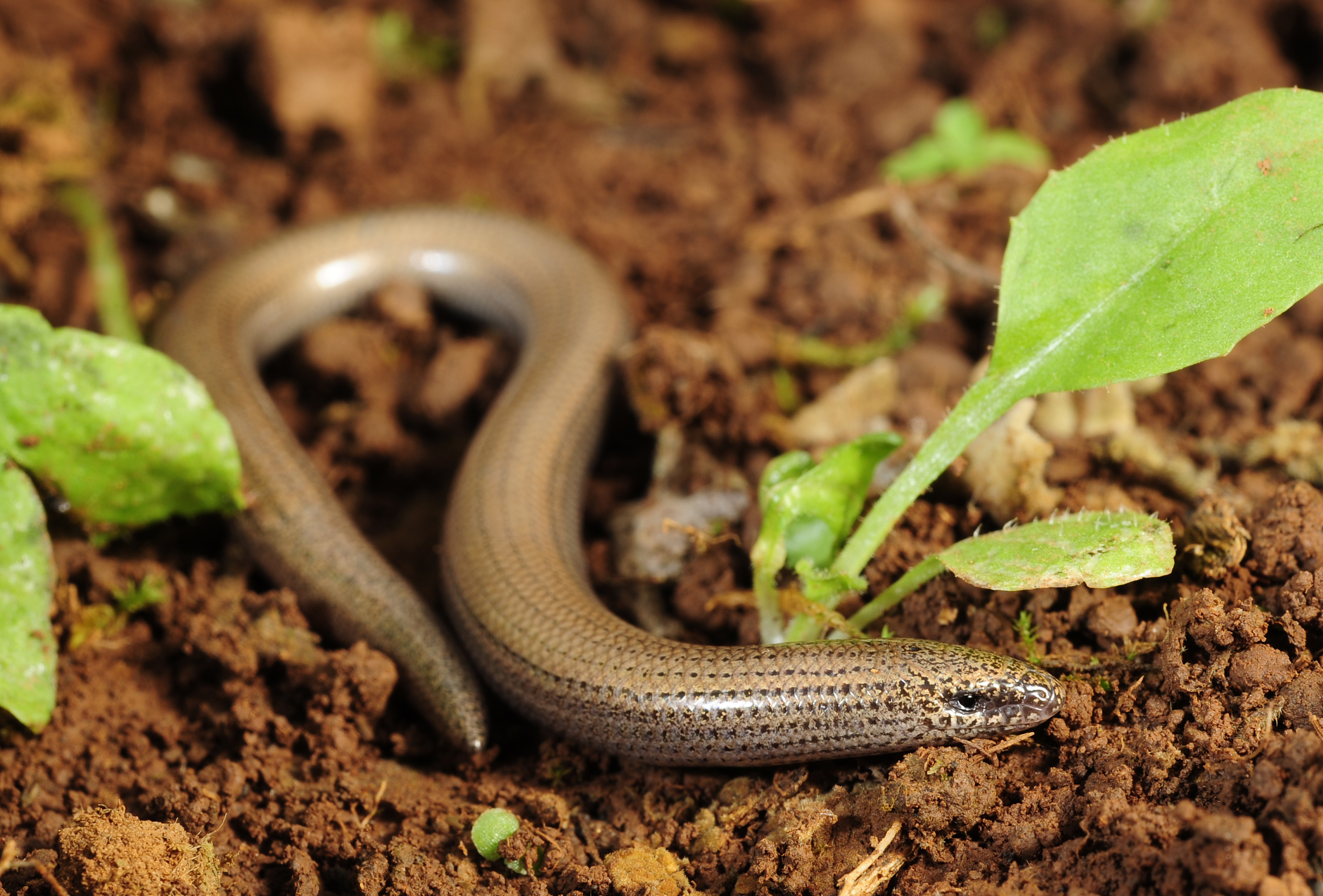
- Ophiomorus punctatissimus from the Peloponnese, Greece

Conservation status
- Least Concern (IUCN 3.1)

Scientific classification
- Kingdom: Animalia
- Phylum: Chordata
- Class: Reptilia
- Order: Squamata
- Family: Scincidae
- Genus: Ophiomorus
- Species: O. punctatissimus

Binomial name
- Ophiomorus punctatissimus (Bibron & Bory de Saint-Vincent, 1833)
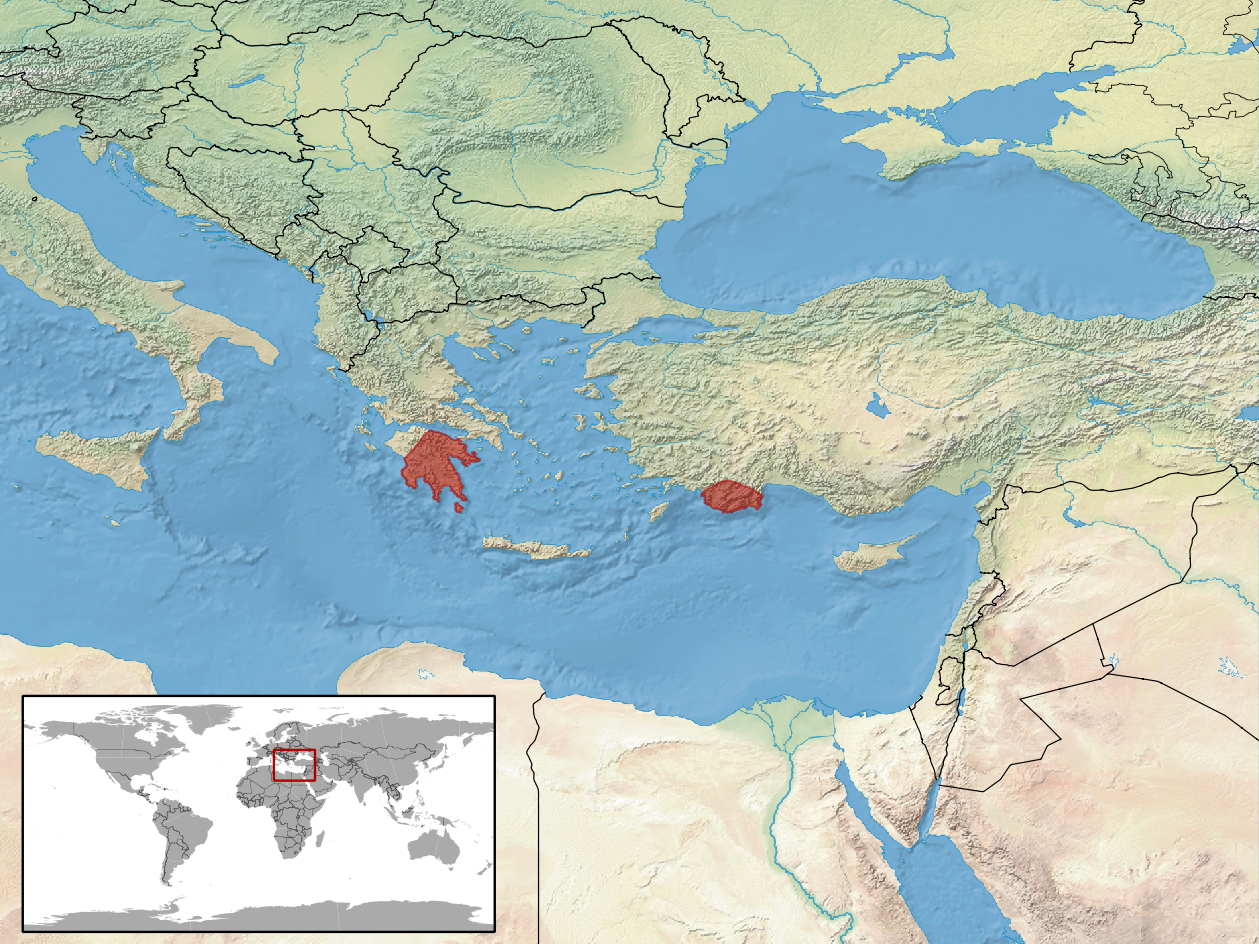

Synonyms
- Anguis punctatissimus Bibron & Bory de Saint-Vincent, 1833; Ophiomorus punctatissimus — Boulenger, 1887

= Greek snake skink =

Species of lizard

The Greek snake skink (Ophiomorus punctatissimus) is a species of skink, a lizard in the family Scincidae.

== Taxonomy ==
The species Ophiomorus kardesi was recently described for the Anatolian genetic lineage previously identified as Ophiomorus punctatissimus. Although no morphological differences have been identified, scientists have concluded that the genetic divergence and divergence time (around 10 million years) warranted recognising Ophiomorus kardesi as a distinct species.

These latter authors note that this work revealed several additional mitochondrial lineages within O. punctatissimus and that further study is needed to clarify the taxonomic status of these.

== Geographic range ==
This species is endemic to Europe, where it occurs in Greece on the Peloponnese Peninsula and on the islands of Kythira and Elafonisos in the Aegean Sea, off the southern tip of the Peloponnese.

== Habitat ==
Its natural habitats are temperate grassland and plantations.
