= Arabian leaf-toed gecko =

Conservation status
- Least Concern (IUCN 3.1)

Scientific classification
- Kingdom: Animalia
- Phylum: Chordata
- Class: Reptilia
- Order: Squamata
- Suborder: Gekkota
- Family: Gekkonidae
- Genus: Hemidactylus
- Species: H. homoeolepis

Binomial name
- Hemidactylus homoeolepis Blanford, 1881
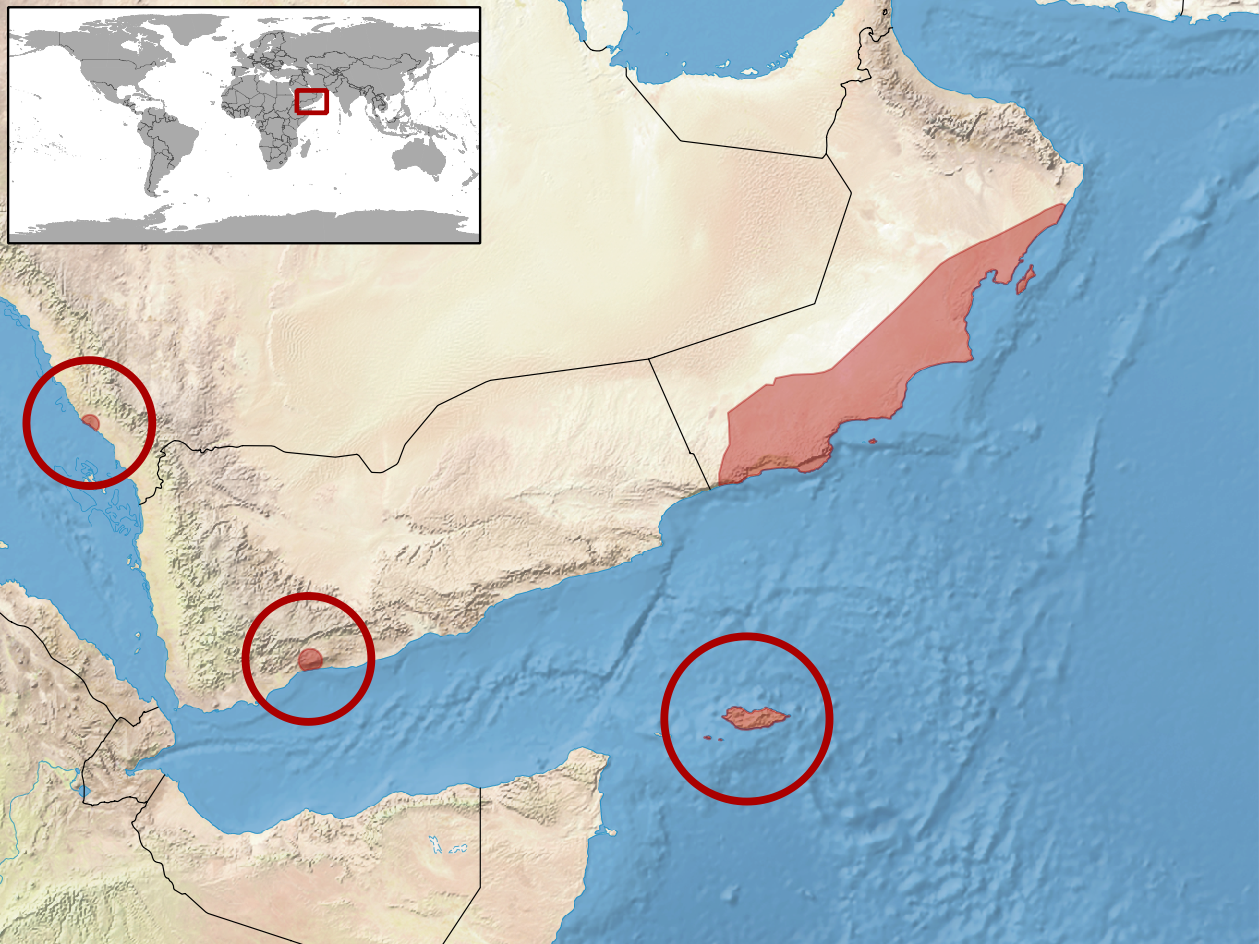

Species of lizard

The Arabian leaf-toed gecko (Hemidactylus homoeolepis) is a species of gecko. It is found in the southern Arabian Peninsula (Saudi Arabia, Yemen, and Oman) and the island of Socotra.
