= Agamura cruralis =

Scientific classification
- Kingdom: Animalia
- Phylum: Chordata
- Class: Reptilia
- Order: Squamata
- Suborder: Gekkota
- Family: Gekkonidae
- Genus: Agamura
- Species: A. cruralis

Binomial name
- Agamura cruralis (Blanford, 1874)

Species of gecko

Agamura cruralis is a species of gecko found in Iran and Pakistan.
