= Ophiomorus chernovi =

Conservation status
- Least Concern (IUCN 3.1)

Scientific classification
- Kingdom: Animalia
- Phylum: Chordata
- Class: Reptilia
- Order: Squamata
- Family: Scincidae
- Genus: Ophiomorus
- Species: O. chernovi

Binomial name
- Ophiomorus chernovi S. Anderson & Leviton, 1966

Species of lizard

Chernov's snake skink (Ophiomorus chernovi) is a species of skink, a lizard in the family Scincidae. The species is native to Western Asia and Central Asia.

== Etymology ==
The specific name, chernovi, is in honor of Russian herpetologist Sergius Alexandrovich Chernov.

== Geographic range ==
O. chernovi is found in Iran and Turkmenistan.

== Description ==
O. chernovi has four digits on each front foot, and it has three digits on each hind foot. It has 24 scale rows around the body at midbody. The snout is cuneiform.

== Reproduction ==
O. chernovi is viviparous.
