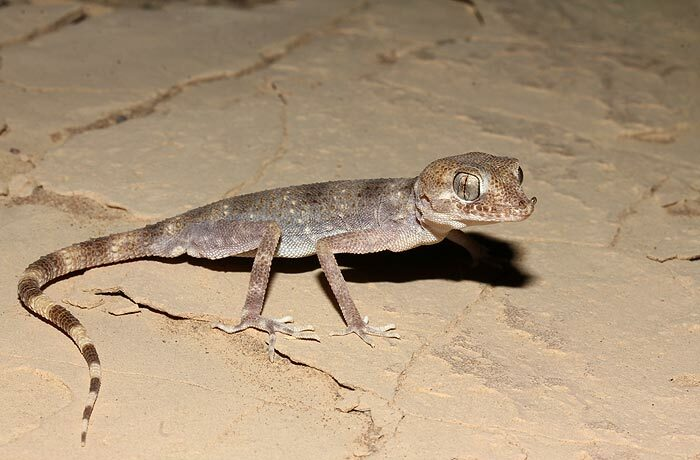

Conservation status
- Least Concern (IUCN 3.1)

Scientific classification
- Kingdom: Animalia
- Phylum: Chordata
- Class: Reptilia
- Order: Squamata
- Suborder: Gekkota
- Family: Gekkonidae
- Genus: Rhinogekko
- Species: R. misonnei

Binomial name
- Rhinogekko misonnei de Witte, 1973
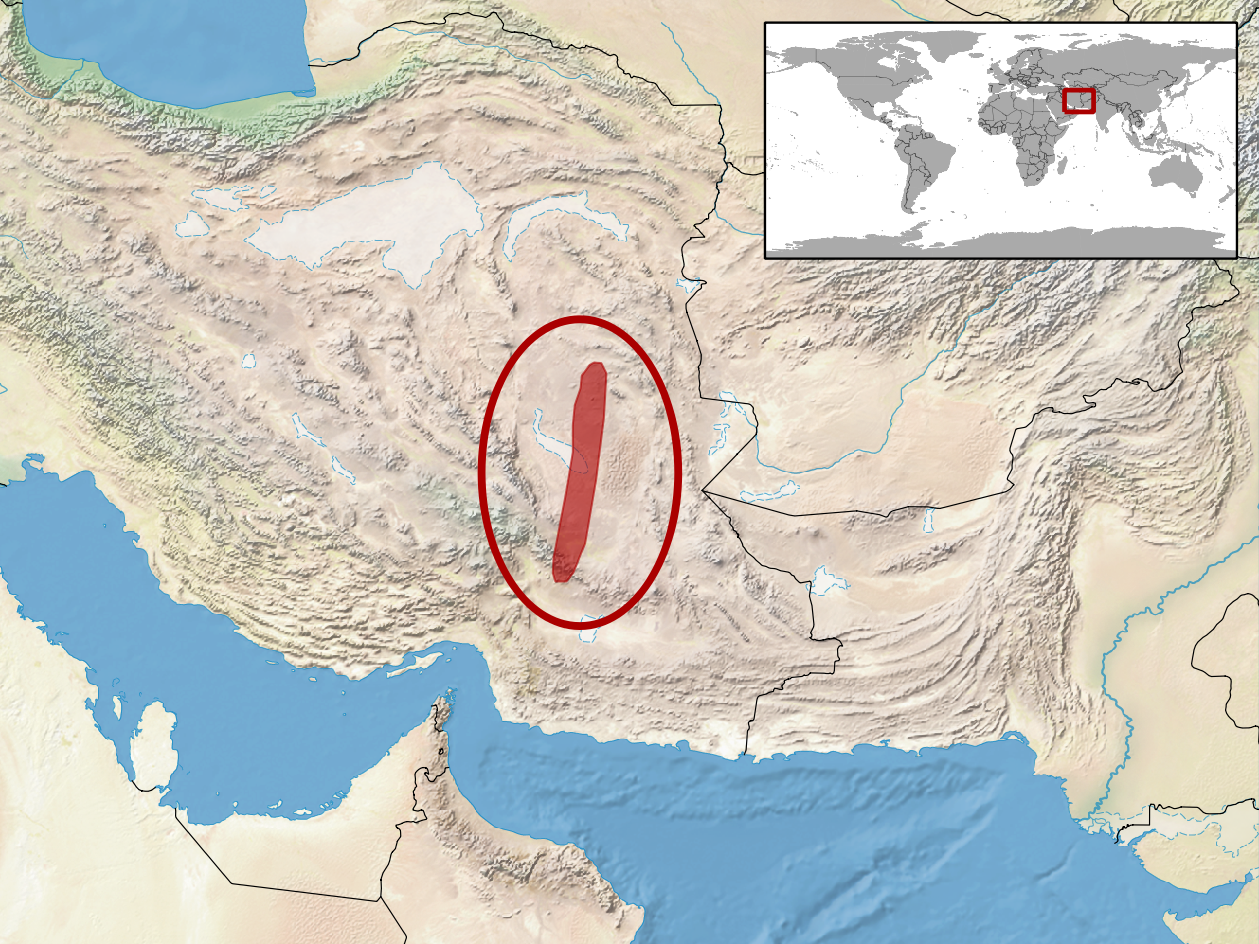

Synonyms
- Rhinogekko misonnei de Witte, 1973; Agamura missonei — Das, 1996; Rhinogecko misonnei — S. Anderson, 1999; Agamura misonnei — Rösler, 2000; Rhinogecko misonnei — Khan, 2003; Rhinogekko misonnei — Šmíd et al., 2014

= Missone's spider gecko =

Species of gecko

Missone's spider gecko (Rhinogekko misonnei), also known commonly as de Witte's gecko, de Witte's spider gecko, Misonne's swollen-nose gecko, and Witte's gecko, is a species of lizard in the family Gekkonidae. The species is native to Western Asia.

== Etymology ==
The specific name, misonnei, is in honor of Xavier Misonne who is a Belgian anthropologist and zoologist.

== Geographic range ==
Rhinogekko misonnei is found in Iran and Pakistan. The IUCN Redlist considers its presence in Pakistan uncertain.

== Habitat ==
The preferred natural habitat of Rhinogekko misonnei is desert.

== Behavior ==
Rhinogekko missonei is terrestrial.

== Reproduction ==
Rhinogekko misonnei is oviparous.
