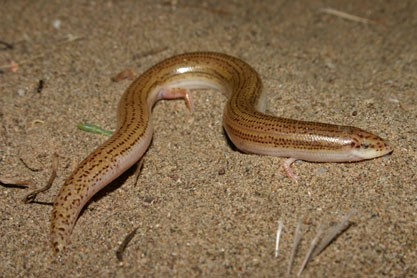

Conservation status
- Least Concern (IUCN 3.1)

Scientific classification
- Kingdom: Animalia
- Phylum: Chordata
- Class: Reptilia
- Order: Squamata
- Family: Scincidae
- Genus: Ophiomorus
- Species: O. streeti

Binomial name
- Ophiomorus streeti Anderson & Leviton, 1966

= Ophiomorus streeti =

Species of lizard

Street's snake skink (Ophiomorus streeti) is a species of skink, a lizard in the family Scincidae. The species is from Iran.
