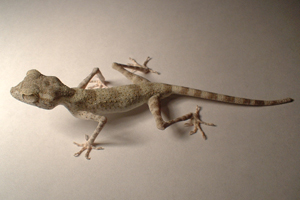

Conservation status
- Least Concern (IUCN 3.1)

Scientific classification
- Domain: Eukaryota
- Kingdom: Animalia
- Phylum: Chordata
- Class: Reptilia
- Order: Squamata
- Infraorder: Gekkota
- Family: Gekkonidae
- Genus: Agamura
- Species: A. persica

Binomial name
- Agamura persica Duméril, 1856
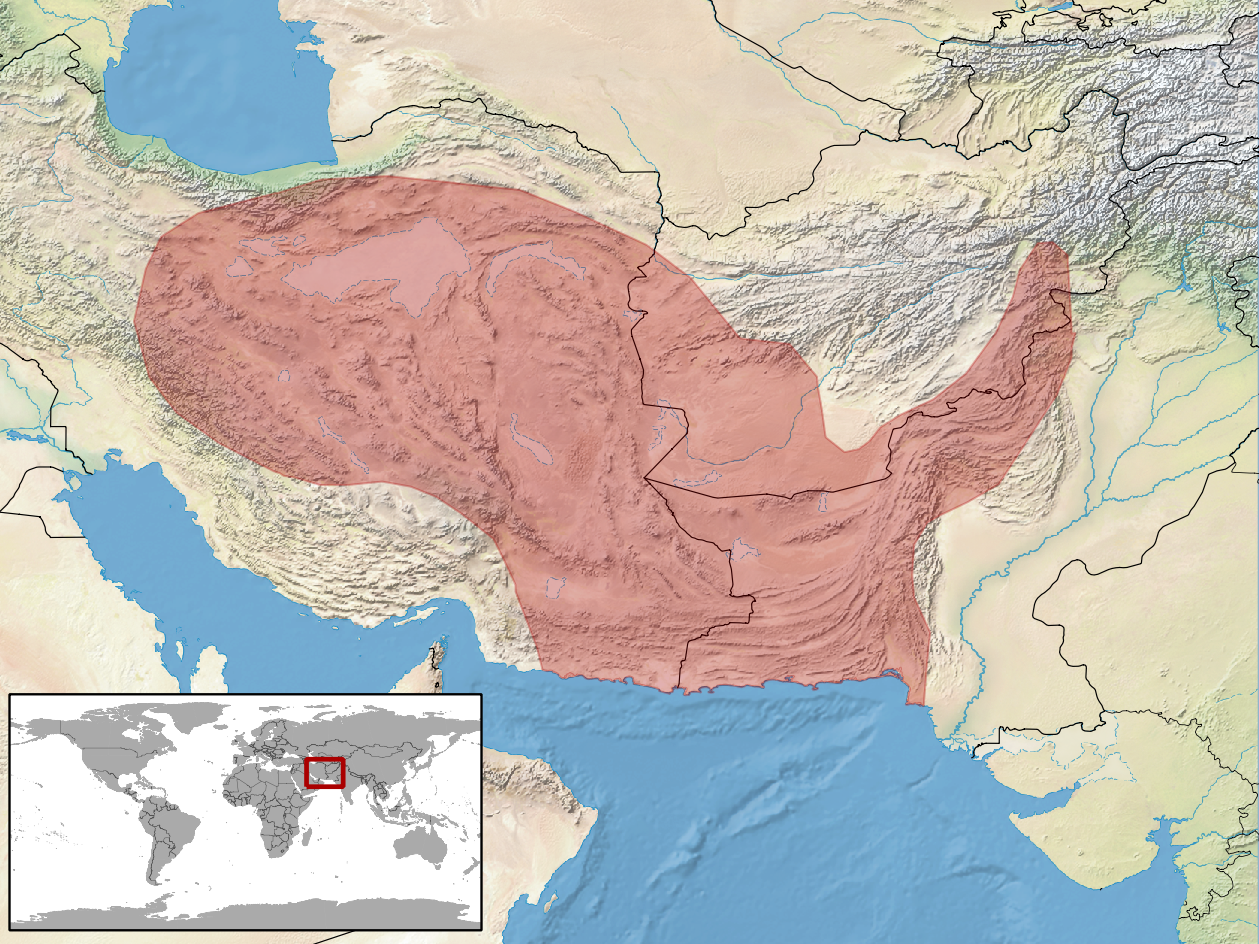

Synonyms
- Gymnodactylus persicus; Agamura cruralis

= Persian spider gecko =

Species of lizard

The Persian spider gecko (Agamura persica) hails from semidesert regions of Iran, Pakistan, and Afghanistan, where temperatures range from extreme summer day highs to extreme winter night lows.

Its long, slender legs and tail give it a spider-like impression and allow it to climb in its rocky habitat. The toes are slender, clawed, and angularly bent. It shares this feature with a number of other species and is classified as an angular-toed gecko. Two other species, Agamura femoralis (Smith, 1933) and Agamura misonnei (De Witte, 1973), have been placed in the genus, but Anderson (1999) and Khan (2003) referred them to the genus Rhinogekko.

== Diagnostic features ==
Females range from 42 to 77 mm (SVL), with a tail of 34 to 59 mm, while males range from 35 to 65 mm, with a tail of 27 to 59 mm.

Agamura persica has a light-grey upper body with yellow pigment and five dark crossbars almost as broad as the interspaces, with 9 to 10 on the tail and a flecked grey belly.

Some colour and morphological differences exist between localities, but all are distinctly agamuroid.

== Subspecies ==
Agamura persica ssp. persica is found in the eastern regions of the species' range (eastern Iran, Afghanistan), and is differentiated by "three dark crossbars, first on nape, second behind shoulders, third in front of sacrum". Agamura persica ssp. cruralis is found in the western regions (most of Iran) and is differentiated by "five darker brown dorsal crossbars, first on nape, fifth on sacrum, nine to ten on tail".

== Natural history ==
The Persian spider gecko inhabits rocky and stony terrain close to sandy semidesert, on hill slopes and barren plains. It is primarily nocturnal, but can be found during the day basking at temperatures of about 17.5 °C (air) and 15.5 °C (surface), and active at surface temperatures as high as 44 °C. Agamura's "well-developed (but immovable) upper 'eyelid'" is an adaptation to diurnal life. The lid serves as a sort of "sunshade".

The Persian spider gecko reaches breeding size at 18 to 24 months of age. Its breeding period is from March to May, eggs are laid in June, and juveniles appear in September.

== Sexing ==
The male Agamura persica has an obvious hemipenal bulge visual from a side profile. The thin morphology of the gecko makes the bulge even more noticeable. The male also has two to four preanal pores, but a captive-bred male may have none to four. The female lacks a bulge and preanal pores entirely. The juvenile also lacks this bulge, but by about the eighth to 12th week (roughly 7–8 cm SVL) the male juvenile may begin to show slight bulging. It may happen as late as the fourth to sixth month.

== Gallery ==
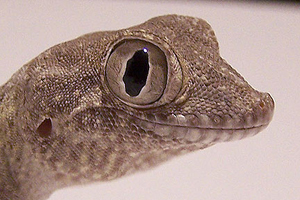
Headshot

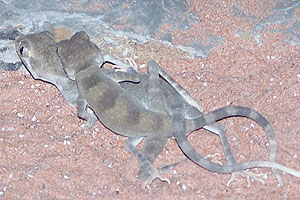
Copulation

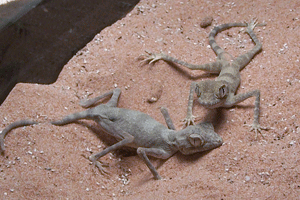
Female burying eggs

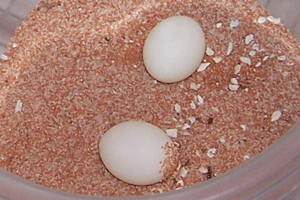
Eggs

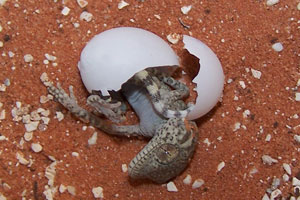
Hatching
