= Maranjab's snake skink =

Scientific classification
- Kingdom: Animalia
- Phylum: Chordata
- Class: Reptilia
- Order: Squamata
- Family: Scincidae
- Genus: Ophiomorus
- Species: O. maranjabensis

Binomial name
- Ophiomorus maranjabensis Kazemi, Farhadi Qomi, Kami, & Anderson, 2011
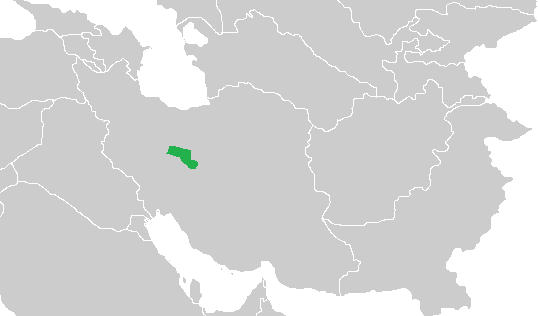

Species of lizard

Maranjab's snake skink (Ophiomorus maranjabensis) is a species of skink, a lizard in the family Scincidae. It can be found in north-east of Kashan, Dasht-e Kavir, Iran. From snout to vent 95 mm, tail 81 mm.
