= Ophiomorus brevipes =

Scientific classification
- Kingdom: Animalia
- Phylum: Chordata
- Class: Reptilia
- Order: Squamata
- Family: Scincidae
- Genus: Ophiomorus
- Species: O. brevipes

Binomial name
- Ophiomorus brevipes (Blanford, 1874)

Species of lizard

The short-legged snake skink (Ophiomorus brevipes) is a species of skink, a lizard in the family Scincidae. The species is from Afghanistan, Pakistan, and Iran.
