= Ophiomorus persicus =

Conservation status
- Least Concern (IUCN 3.1)

Scientific classification
- Kingdom: Animalia
- Phylum: Chordata
- Class: Reptilia
- Order: Squamata
- Suborder: Scinciformata
- Infraorder: Scincomorpha
- Family: Scincidae
- Genus: Ophiomorus
- Species: O. persicus

Binomial name
- Ophiomorus persicus (Steindachner, 1867)
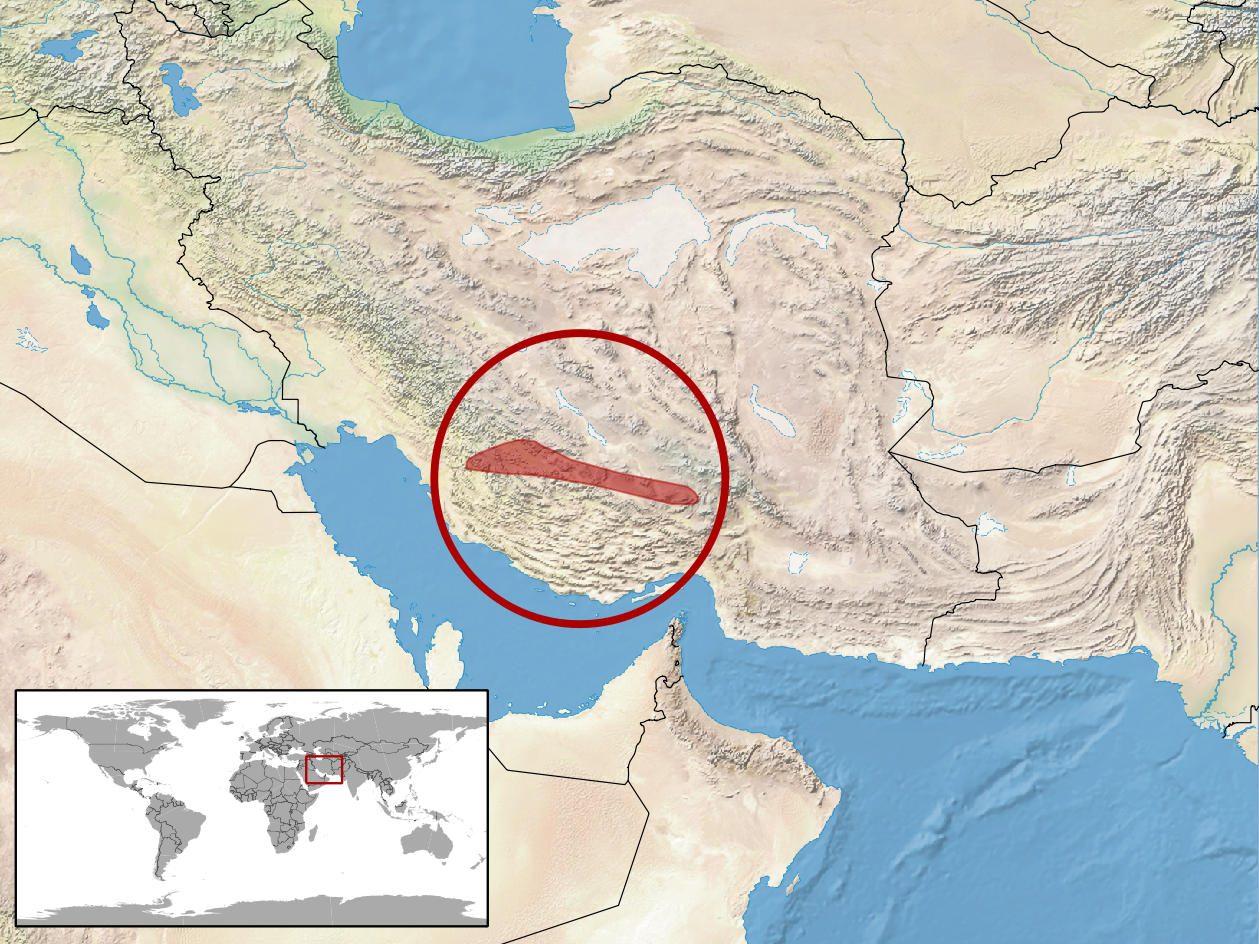

Synonyms
- Hemipodion persicum Steindachner, 1867

Species of lizard

The Persian snake skink (Ophiomorus persicus) is a species of skink endemic to Iran. A specimen collected in 1999 was found on sandy clay soil near Artemisia shrubs. It was originally described in 1867 as Hemipodion persicum.
