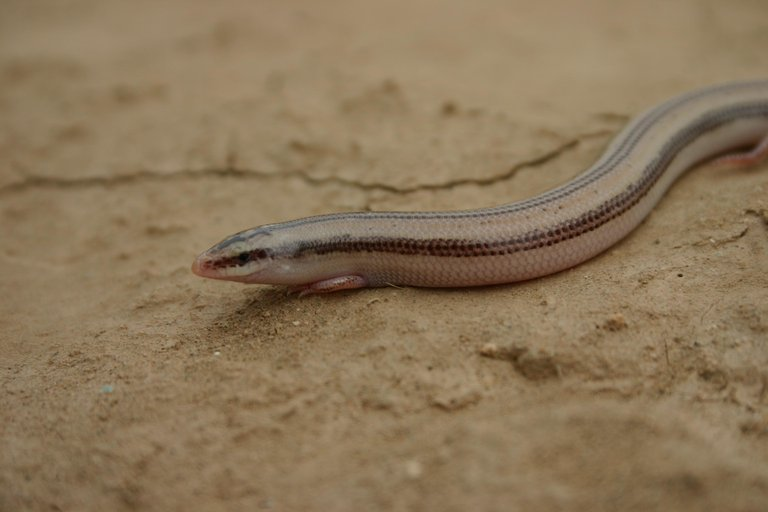

Conservation status
- Least Concern (IUCN 3.1)

Scientific classification
- Kingdom: Animalia
- Phylum: Chordata
- Class: Reptilia
- Order: Squamata
- Family: Scincidae
- Genus: Ophiomorus
- Species: O. nuchalis

Binomial name
- Ophiomorus nuchalis Nilson & Andrén, 1978
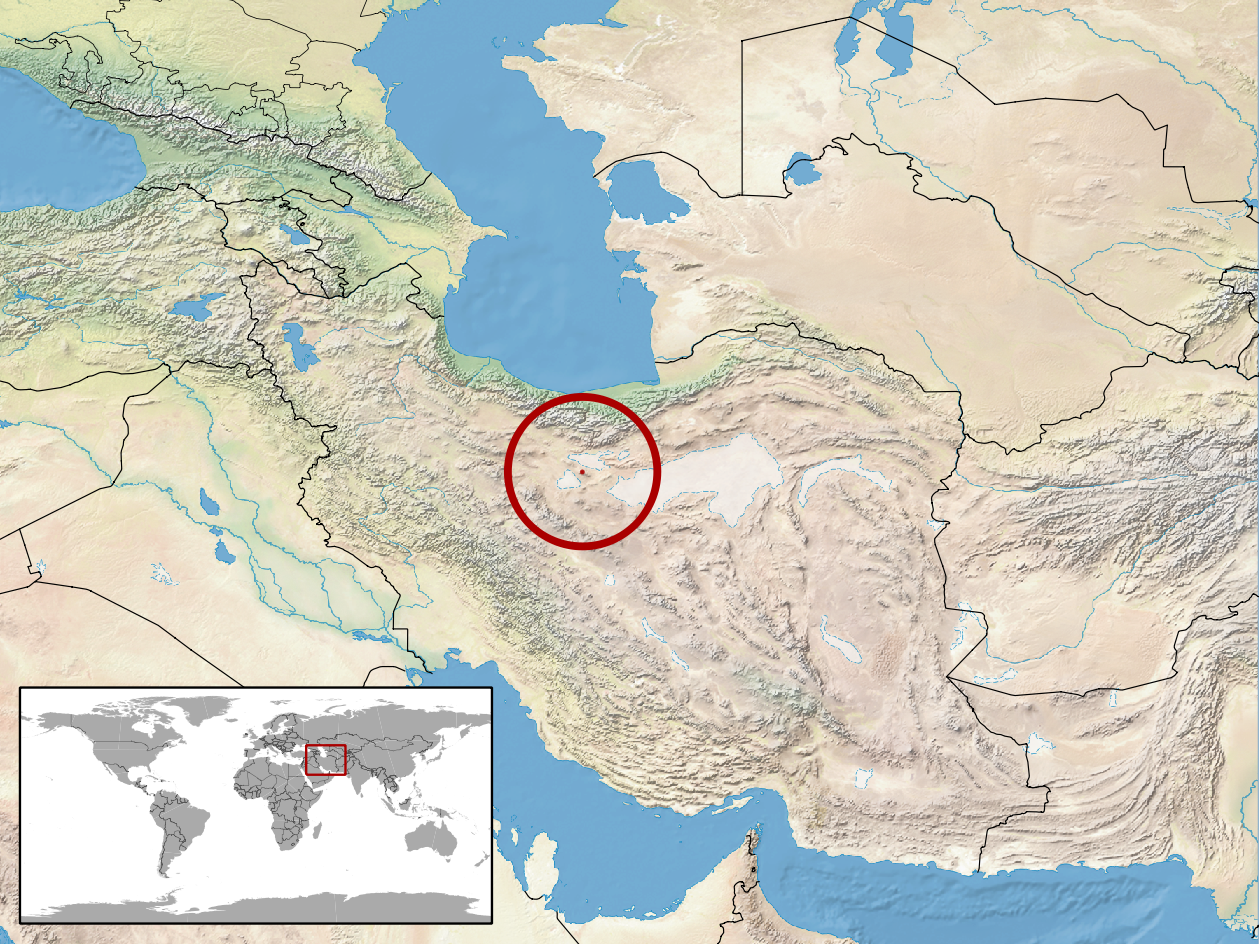

= Ophiomorus nuchalis =

Species of lizard

Ophiomorus nuchalis, the Nilson's snake skink or plateau snake skink, is a species of skink, a lizard in the family Scincidae. The species is endemic to Iran.
