= Agamura kermanensis =

Scientific classification
- Domain: Eukaryota
- Kingdom: Animalia
- Phylum: Chordata
- Class: Reptilia
- Order: Squamata
- Infraorder: Gekkota
- Family: Gekkonidae
- Genus: Agamura
- Species: A. kermanensis

Binomial name
- Agamura kermanensis Hosseinian-Yousefkhani, Aliabadian, Rastegar-Pouyani, Darvish, Shafiei, & Sehhatisabet, 2018

Species of gecko

Agamura kermanensis is a species of gecko found in Iran.
