= Ophiomorus raithmai =

Conservation status
- Least Concern (IUCN 3.1)

Scientific classification
- Kingdom: Animalia
- Phylum: Chordata
- Class: Reptilia
- Order: Squamata
- Family: Scincidae
- Genus: Ophiomorus
- Species: O. raithmai

Binomial name
- Ophiomorus raithmai S.C. Anderson & Leviton, 1966
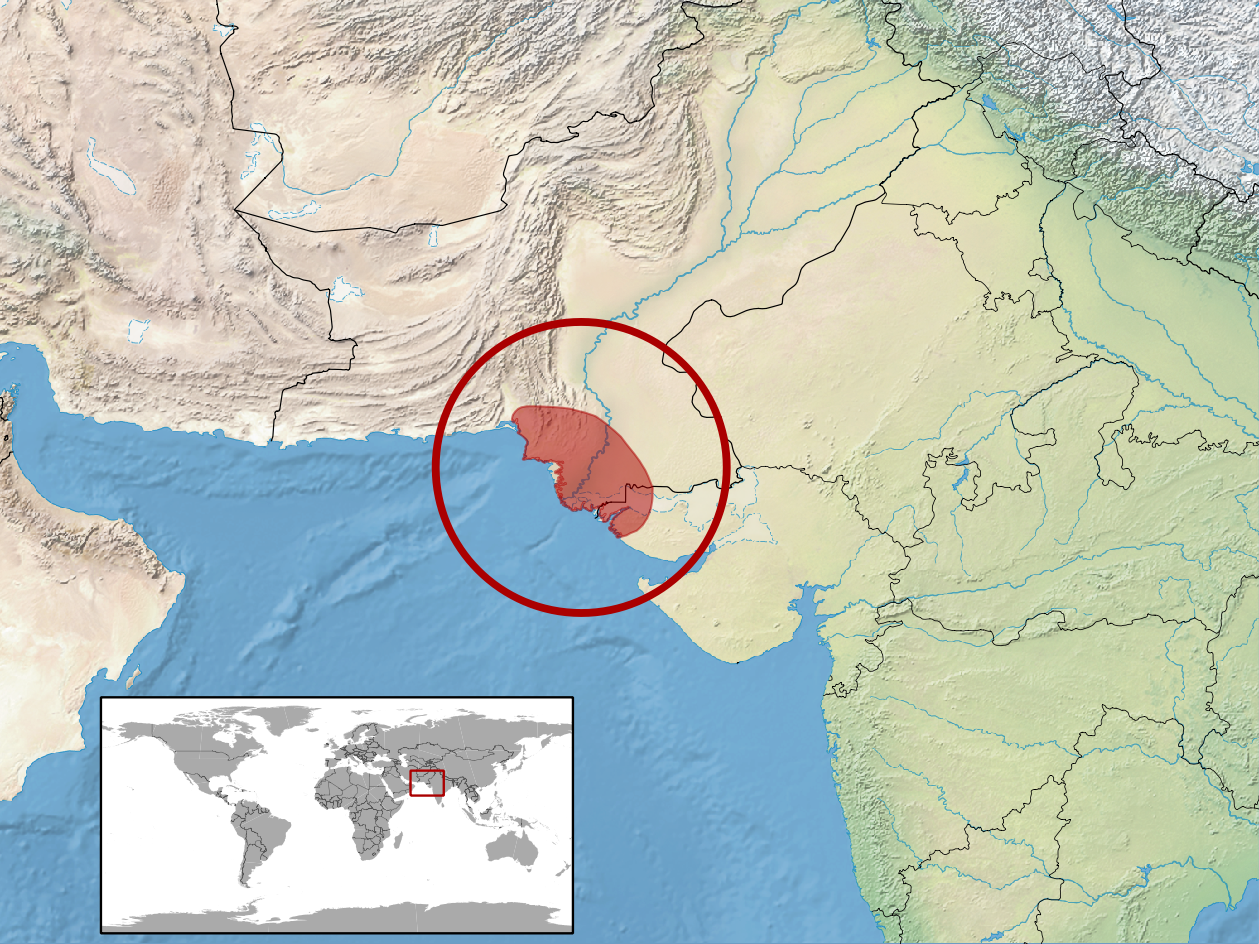

Species of lizard

Ophiomorus raithmai, known commonly as the eastern sand swimmer and the three-fingered sand-fish, is a species of skink, a lizard in the family Scincidae. The species is found in India and Pakistan.

== Etymology ==
The specific name, raithmai, is derived from the Sindhi common name for this lizard, raith mai, which means "sand fish".

== Geographic range ==
O. raithmai is found in northwestern India (Gujarat, Punjab, Rajasthan) and in adjacent southeastern Pakistan.

== Habitat ==
The natural habitat of O. raithmai is desert.

== Reproduction ==
O. raithmai is viviparous.
