= Myriopholis blanfordi =

Scientific classification
- Kingdom: Animalia
- Phylum: Chordata
- Class: Reptilia
- Order: Squamata
- Suborder: Serpentes
- Family: Leptotyphlopidae
- Genus: Myriopholis
- Species: M. blanfordi

Binomial name
- Myriopholis blanfordi (Boulenger, 1890)

Synonyms
- Glauconia blanfordii Boulenger, 1890; Glauconia blanfordii — Boulenger, 1893; Glauconia laticeps Nikolsky, 1907; Glauconia carltoni Barbour, 1908; Leptotyphlops blanfordi — M.A. Smith, 1943; Glauconia blanfondi — Sundersingh, 1960 (typographical error); Leptotypheops beanyordi Sundersingh, 1960 (typographical error); Leptotyphlops blanfordi blanfordi — Hahn, 1980; Myriopholis blanfordi — Adalsteinsson et al., 2009; Myriopholis blanfordii — Wallach et al., 2014

Species of snake

Myriopholis blanfordi, also known commonly as Blanford's worm snake and the Sindh thread snake, is a species of harmless blind snake in the family Leptotyphlopidae. The species is native to South Asia and Iran, and possibly further west in the Middle East. There are no recognized subspecies.

== Etymology ==
M. blanfordi is named after English naturalist William Thomas Blanford (1832–1905), member of the Geological Survey of India.

== Subspecies ==
There are no subspecies of M. blanfordi that are recognized as being valid.

== Geographic range ==
M. blanfordi is found in India, Pakistan, Afghanistan, southern Iran, and possibly the Arabian Peninsula. The type locality given is "Sind" [Punjab, India].

== Reproduction ==
M. blanfordi is oviparous.
