= Ophiomorus blanfordii =

Scientific classification
- Kingdom: Animalia
- Phylum: Chordata
- Class: Reptilia
- Order: Squamata
- Family: Scincidae
- Genus: Ophiomorus
- Species: O. blanfordii

Binomial name
- Ophiomorus blanfordii (Blanford, 1879)

Synonyms
- Zygnidopsis brevipes Blanford, 1879 (non Blanford, 1874); Ophiomorus blanfordii Boulenger, 1887 (nomen novum)

Species of lizard

Ophiomorus blanfordii, also known commonly as Blanford's snake skink, is a species of lizard in the family Scincidae. The species is native to Western Asia and South Asia.

== Etymology ==
The specific name, blanfordii, is in honor of English naturalist William Thomas Blanford.

== Geographic range ==
O. blanfordii is found in southeastern Iran and northwestern Pakistan.

== Description ==
O. blanfordii may attain a snout-to-vent length (SVL) of 8 cm (3.1 in), with a tail length of 7.5 cm (3.0 in). The legs are small and underdeveloped. Each front foot has four toes, and each hind foot has three toes.

== Reproduction ==
O. blanfordii is viviparous.
