= Rhinogekko femoralis =

Conservation status
- Least Concern (IUCN 3.1)

Scientific classification
- Kingdom: Animalia
- Phylum: Chordata
- Class: Reptilia
- Order: Squamata
- Suborder: Gekkota
- Family: Gekkonidae
- Genus: Rhinogekko
- Species: R. femoralis

Binomial name
- Rhinogekko femoralis (Smith, 1933)

Synonyms
- Agamura femoralis Smith, 1933; Rhinogecko femoralis (Smith, 1933)

Species of lizard

Rhinogekko femoralis, also known as the sharp-tailed spider gecko or Kharan spider gecko, is a species of gecko found in Pakistan and Iran. The IUCN Redlist considers its presence in Iran uncertain. It measures 52–60 mm (2.0–2.4 in) in snout–vent length.
