= Ophiomorus kardesi =

Scientific classification
- Kingdom: Animalia
- Phylum: Chordata
- Class: Reptilia
- Order: Squamata
- Family: Scincidae
- Genus: Ophiomorus
- Species: O. kardesi

Binomial name
- Ophiomorus kardesi Kornilios, Kumlutaş, Lymberakis, & Ilgaz, 2018

Species of lizard

Ophiomorus kardesi is a species of skink, a lizard in the family Scincidae. The species is from Turkey.
