= Ophiomorus tridactylus =

Scientific classification
- Kingdom: Animalia
- Phylum: Chordata
- Class: Reptilia
- Order: Squamata
- Family: Scincidae
- Genus: Ophiomorus
- Species: O. tridactylus

Binomial name
- Ophiomorus tridactylus (Blyth, 1853)

Synonyms
- Sphenocephalus tridactylus Blyth, 1853; Ophiomorus tridactylus — Boulenger, 1887

Species of lizard

Ophiomorus tridactylus, commonly known as the three-toed snake skink, is a species of skink endemic to sandy desert areas of South Asia. It is also called the Indian sand-swimmer for its habit of moving just under the sand.

== Distribution ==
O. tridactylus is found in India, Pakistan, and Afghanistan.

== Description ==
Snout wedge-shaped, with angularly projecting labial edge; mouth inferior. Nostril close to the rostral, which is large and nearly reaches the posterior border of the supranasals; a small anterior and a larger second loreal, the latter usually coalesced with the prefrontal on each side; frontonasal rather large, one half or two thirds the length of the frontal; latter as broad as long or slightly broader, 3 or 4 very small supraoculars; no supraciliaries; a preocular; interparietal as long as broad, as long as the frontal or slightly shorter; frontoparietals small; parietals band-like, narrow; a pair of nuchals, in contact with the interparietal; first and second upper labials smallest, in contact with the nasal, fifth much larger than the four anterior together. Ear hidden. Two azygos postmentals. Body much elongate, with angular latero-ventral edge, with two pairs of short tridactyle limbs; the posterior limbs proportionately much more developed than the anterior, and a little longer than the distance between the fore limb and the anterior corner of the eye. 22 scales round the body, those of the back and of the two median ventral series narrower than the others. Two slightly enlarged preanals. Tail shorter than head and body, cyclotetragonal at the base, compressed and pointed at the end.

Cream-coloured, uniform or with longitudinal series of brown dots on the back; a more or less distinct brown streak passing through the eye.

From snout to vent 3.75 inches (9.5 cm), tail 2.2 inches (5.6 cm).
