= Rhinogekko =

Scientific classification
- Kingdom: Animalia
- Phylum: Chordata
- Class: Reptilia
- Order: Squamata
- Suborder: Gekkota
- Family: Gekkonidae
- Subfamily: Gekkoninae
- Genus: Rhinogekko de Witte, 1973

Species
- Two species (see text)

Genus of lizards

Rhinogekko is a genus of geckos, lizards in the family Gekkonidae. Species in the genus are native to Iran and Pakistan.

== Species ==
The genus Rhinogekko contains two species that re recognized as being valid.

- Rhinogekko femoralis (M.A. Smith, 1933)
- Rhinogekko misonnei de Witte, 1973

Nota bene: A binomial authority in parentheses indicates that the species was originally described in a genus other than Rhinogekko.
