= William Thomas Blanford =

English geologist and naturalist (1832–1905)

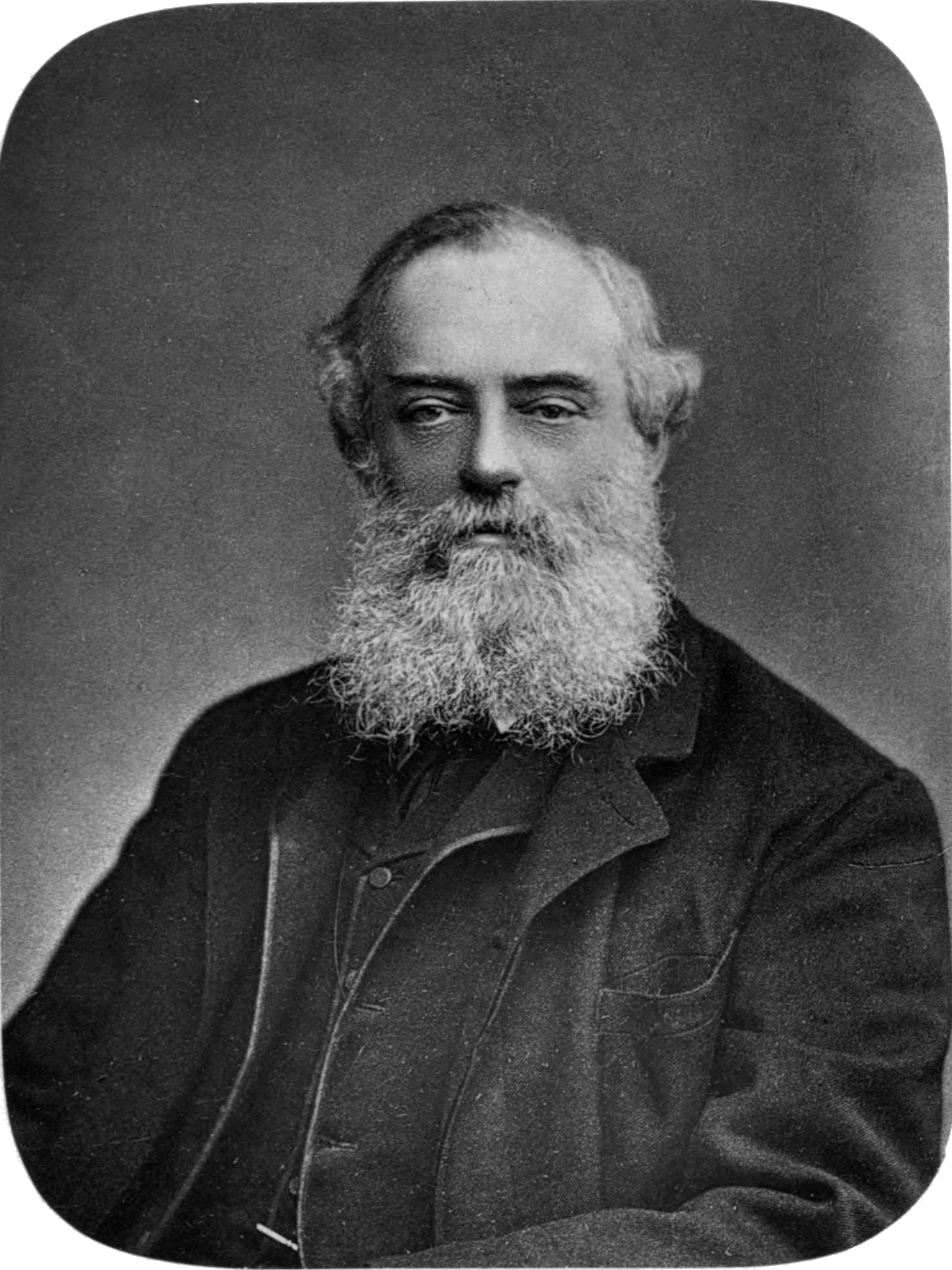
- Born: 7 October 1832; London, England
- Died: 23 June 1905 (aged 72); London, England
- Education: School of Design, Somerset House; Royal School of Mines (Imperial College London); mining school, Freiberg, Saxony
- Known for: The Fauna of British India, Including Ceylon and Burma
- Spouse: Ida Gertrude Bellhouse
- Parents: William Blanford (father); Elizabeth Simpson (mother)
- Awards: Wollaston Medal (1883); Royal Medal (1901)
- Scientific career
- Workplaces: Civitavecchia, Italy; Geological Survey of India
- Author abbrev. (zoology): Blanford

William Thomas Blanford CIE FRS (7 October 1832 – 23 June 1905) was an English geologist and naturalist. He is best remembered as the editor of a major series on The Fauna of British India, Including Ceylon and Burma.

== Biography ==
Blanford was born in London to William Blanford and Elizabeth Simpson. His father owned a factory next to their house on Bouverie street, Whitefriars. He was educated in private schools in Brighton (until 1846) and Paris (1848). He joined his family business in carving and gilding and studied at the School of Design in Somerset House. Suffering from ill health, he spent two years in a business house at Civitavecchia owned by a friend of his father. His initial aim was to enter a mercantile career. On returning to England in 1851 he was induced to enter the newly established Royal School of Mines (now part of Imperial College London), which his younger brother Henry F. Blanford (1834–1893), afterwards head of the Indian Meteorological Department, had already joined. He studied under Henry De la Beche, Lyon Playfair, Edward Forbes, Ramsay, and Warington Smyth. He then spent a year in the mining school (Bergakademie) at Freiberg, Saxony, and towards the close of 1854 both he and his brother obtained posts on the Geological Survey of India. In that service he remained for twenty-seven years, retiring in 1882. After his retirement he took up editorship of The Fauna of British India, Including Ceylon and Burma series.

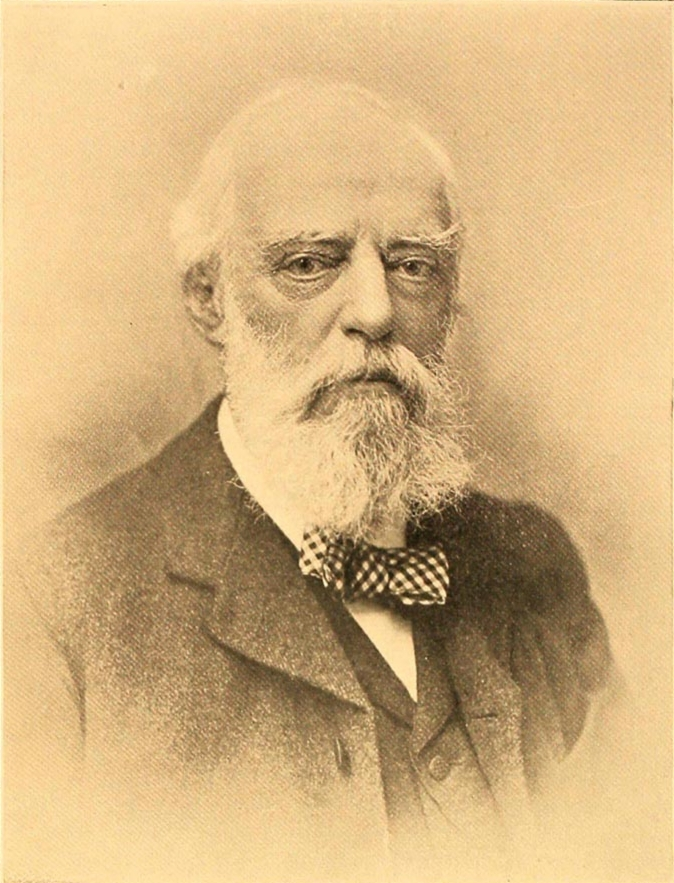
Portrait

He was engaged in various parts of India, in the Raniganj coalfield, in Bombay, and in the coalfield near Talcher, where boulders considered to have been ice-borne were found in the Talcher strata (Talchir tillite)—a remarkable discovery confirmed by subsequent observations of other geologists in equivalent strata (Permian) elsewhere across Gondwanaland. Blanford took an interest in the Permo-Triassic Glossopteris flora. He commented on the geological age of this region in his much later address to the British Association in 1884. Between 1857 and 1860 he was involved in a survey of the Rajniganj coalfields, followed by visits to Trichinopoly and the Nilgiri Hills. In 1860 he went to Burma to study an extinct volcano, Puppadoung and in 1862 he took an interest in the Deccan Traps. In 1867 he joined an expedition to Abyssinia, the results of which were published in Observation on the Geology and Zoology of Abyssinia (1870). accompanying the army to Magdala and back; and in 1871–1872 he was appointed a member of the Persian Boundary Commission along with O. B. St. John. After a voyage to Basra he started back from Gwadar, 200 miles west of Karachi. He marched to Shiraz with St. John's party and then travelled alone through Ispahan to Teheran to join Sir Richard Pollock. He visited the Elbruz Mountains and returned to England from the Caspian via Astrakhan, Moscow, St. Petersburg and Berlin to reach home in September 1872. The best use was made of the exceptional opportunities of studying the natural history of those countries. He subsequently spent time to produce the report on Zoology. He represented the Indian Government at the meeting of the Geological Congress in Bologna. His attention was given not only to geology but to zoology, and especially to the land gastropods and to the vertebrates. He joined H J Elwes on a journey to Sikkim in 1870 during which several new bird species were described. Between 1870 and 1881 Blanford described 36 new species of reptiles and three new species of amphibians.

In 1883 he married Ida Gertrude Bellhouse, and settled at Bedford Gardens, Campden Hill.

For his many contributions to geological science, Blanford was in 1883 awarded the Wollaston medal by the Geological Society of London. For his labours on the zoology and geology of British India he received in 1901 a royal medal from the Royal Society. He had been elected F.R.S. in 1874, and was chosen president of the Geological Society in 1888. He was created Companion of the Order of the Indian Empire in 1904. He died at his home at the age of 72 in Bedford Gardens, Campden Hill, in London on 23 June 1905 and is buried in a family vault at Highgate Cemetery.

His principal publications were: Observations on the Geology and Zoology of Abyssinia (1870), Manual of the Geology of India, with H. B. Medlicott (1879) and the third volume in Birds following the work of E. W. Oates in The Fauna of British India, Including Ceylon and Burma series.

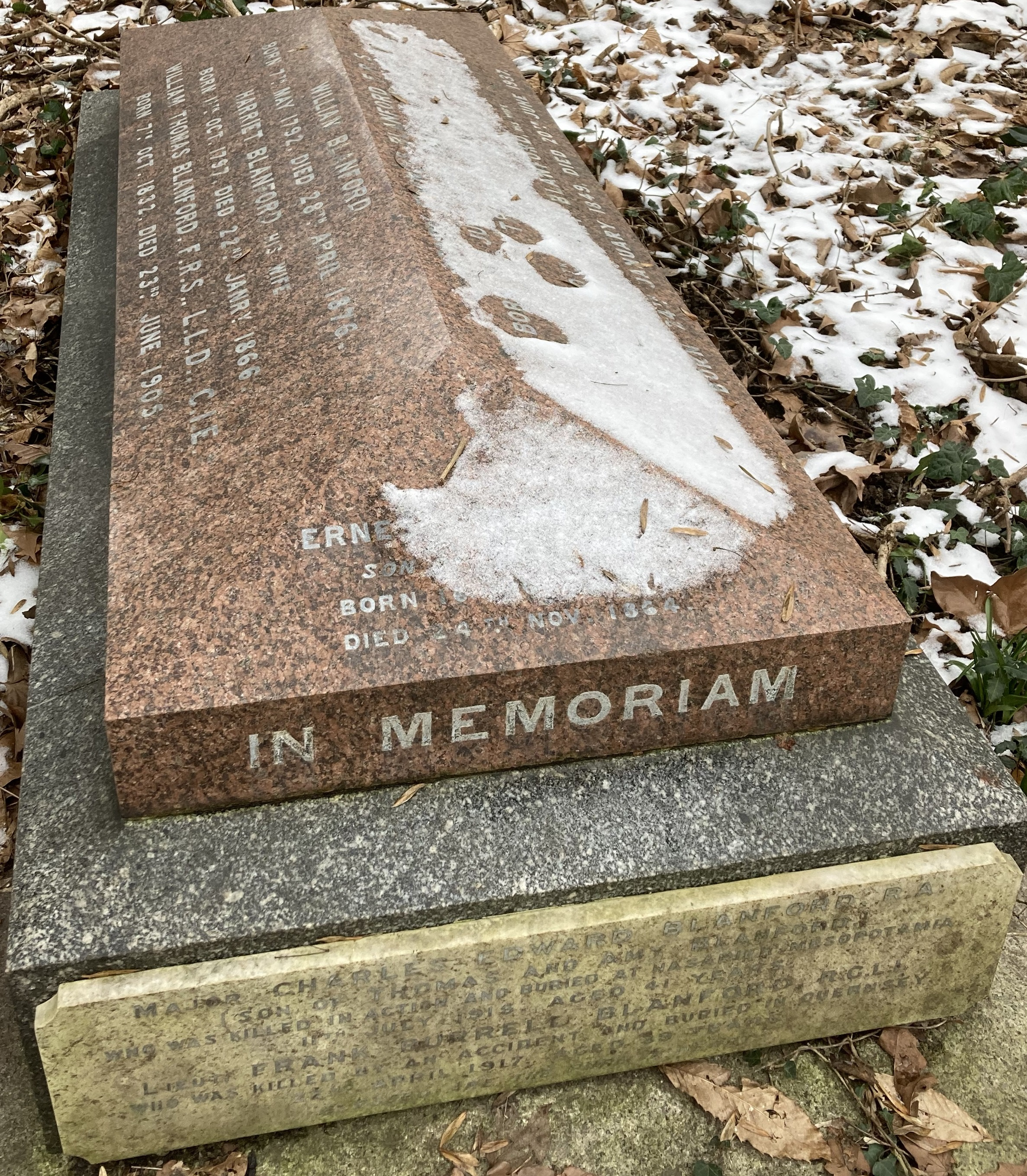
Family vault of William Blanford in Highgate Cemetery (west side)

== Bibliography ==
- 1876: Eastern Persia: An Account of the Journeys of the Persian Boundary Commission 1870-71-72, the Zoology and Geology – volume 2
- 1879: A manual of the geology of India – volume 2 – with Henry Benedict Medlicott, Valentine Ball, Frederick Richard Mallet
- 1888: Mammalia
- 1889: Birds – volume 1 – with Eugene William Oates
- 1889: Birds – volume 2 – with Eugene William Oates
- 1889: Birds – volume 3 – with Eugene William Oates
- 1889: Birds – volume 4 – with Eugene William Oates
- 1889: The Fauna of British India, Including Ceylon and Burma. Birds, volume 1 with Eugene William Oates
- 1889: The Fauna of British India, Including Ceylon and Burma. Birds, volume 2 with Eugene William Oates
- 1889: The Fauna of British India, Including Ceylon and Burma. Birds, volume 3 with Eugene William Oates
- Blanford W. T. & Godwin-Austen H. H. 1908: Mollusca. Testacellidae and Zonitidae. The Fauna of British India, Including Ceylon and Burma.
- 1922: Birds – volume 1 – with Edward Charles Stuart Baker and with Eugene William Oates

== Taxa named in honour ==
Taxa named in honour of William Thomas Blanford include:

- Blanfordia A. Adams, 1863 – a genus of terrestrial gastropod mollusks in the family Pomatiopsidae
- Calandrella blanfordi (Shelley, 1902) – Blanford's short-toed lark
- Bunopus blanfordii Strauch, 1887 – Blanford's ground gecko
- Draco blanfordii Boulenger, 1885 – Blanford's flying lizard
- Acanthodactylus blanfordii Boulenger, 1918 – Blanford's fringe-fingered lizard
- Ophiomorus blanfordii Boulenger, 1887 – Blanford's snake skink
- Psammophilus blanfordanus (Stoliczka, 1871) – Blanford's rock agama
- Afrotyphlops blanfordii (Boulenger, 1889) – Blanford's blind snake
- Myriopholis blanfordi (Boulenger, 1890) – Blanford's worm snake
- Sphaerias blanfordi (Thomas, 1891) – Blanford's fruit bat
- Vulpes cana (Blanford, 1877) – Blanford's fox
