= Banded lipinia =

There are two species of skink named Banded lipinia:

- Lipinia microcerca, found in Vietnam, Cambodia, and Laos
- Lipinia vittigera, native to Myanmar, Thailand, Vietnam, Malaysia, Singapore, and Cambodia
