= Big-eared lipinia =

Conservation status
- Data Deficient (IUCN 3.1)

Scientific classification
- Kingdom: Animalia
- Phylum: Chordata
- Class: Reptilia
- Order: Squamata
- Family: Scincidae
- Genus: Lipinia
- Species: L. macrotympanum

Binomial name
- Lipinia macrotympanum (Stoliczka, 1873)

Synonyms
- Mocoa macrotympanum Stoliczka, 1873; Lygosoma macrotympanum — Boulenger, 1887; Leiolopisma macrotympanum — Smith, 1935; Lipinia macrotympana

Species of lizard

The big-eared lipinia (Lipinia macrotympanum) is a species of skink in the family Scincidae. It is endemic to the Andaman and Nicobar Islands of India.

== Description ==
The body is moderately slender. The snout is attenuated and prolonged. The lower eyelid has an undivided transparent disk.

The nostril pierced in the nasal. It has no supranasal, while the frontonasal is in contact with the rostral, posteriorly just touching the frontal. It has 4 supraoculars: proprietorial single; inter parietal distinct; parietal forming a suture behind the interparietal; 4 pairs of nuchals and a fifth upper.

The labial is under the orbit. Its ear-opening is very large and rounded, with a perfectly smooth edge. It has 22 smooth scales round the middle of the body. The dorsal is slightly larger than laterals. It has a pair of moderately enlarged preanals. The limbs are proportionately developed, with slender toes.

The head is brown, but paler on the snout. It has 3 longitudinal white bands along the body, separated by two somewhat broader brown bands. The median dorsal white band becomes obsolete at the root of the tail. The labials and sides of head are brownish and white-spotted. The limbs have close longitudinal brown lines, while the digits are powdered with pure white. The lower portion of the sides and lower surfaces are livid carneous, tinged with bright orange on the lower belly and on the tail. Its total length is 4 inches, of which the tail measures nearly 2.5. The type specimen was collected in the South Andaman on a sandy beach in Macpherson's Straits.
