= Lipinia inexpectata =

Conservation status
- Least Concern (IUCN 3.1)

Scientific classification
- Kingdom: Animalia
- Phylum: Chordata
- Class: Reptilia
- Order: Squamata
- Family: Scincidae
- Genus: Lipinia
- Species: L. inexpectata

Binomial name
- Lipinia inexpectata Das & Austin, 2007

Species of lizard

Lipinia inexpectata is a species of skink. Prior to its description, it was confused with Lipinia quadrivittata. It is endemic to Borneo and is found in both Indonesian and Malaysian parts of the island.
