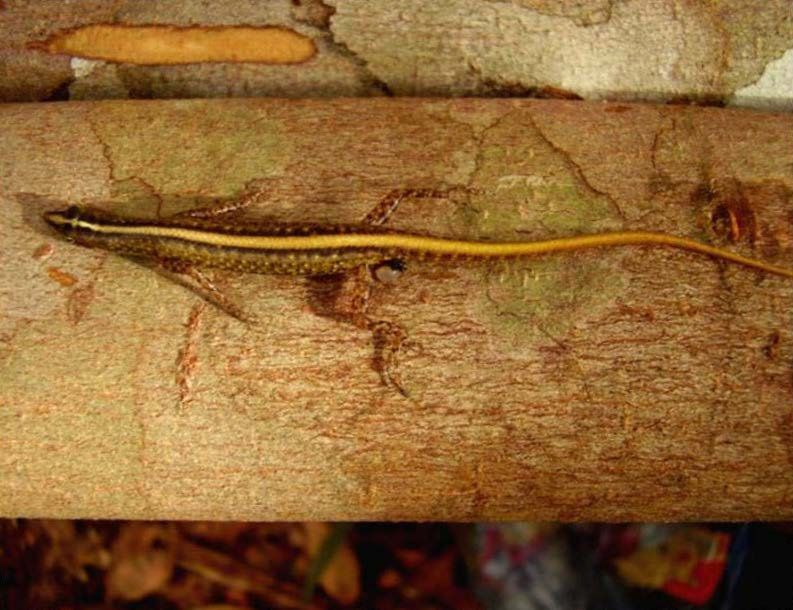
- Lipinia pulchella

Scientific classification
- Kingdom: Animalia
- Phylum: Chordata
- Class: Reptilia
- Order: Squamata
- Family: Scincidae
- Subfamily: Sphenomorphinae
- Genus: Lipinia; Gray, 1845

Species
- 28, see text.

= Lipinia =

Genus of lizards

Lipinia is a genus of skinks, lizards in the family Scincidae. Species in the genus Lipinia are commonly called lipinias.

== Taxonomy ==
The genus Lipinia belongs to the Sphenomorphus group of genera in which Lipinia has a rather basal position (Austin & Arnold 2006).

== Species ==
The following species are recognized as being valid.

- Lipinia auriculata (Taylor, 1917) – Taylor's lipinia
- Lipinia cheesmanae (Parker, 1940) – Cheesman's lipinia, Cheesman's moth skink
- Lipinia inconspicua (Müller, 1894) – hidden ground skink
- Lipinia inexpectata Das & C. Austin, 2007
- Lipinia infralineolata (A. Günther, 1873)
- Lipinia leptosoma (W. Brown & Fehlmann, 1958) – slender lipinia, Pandanus skink
- Lipinia longiceps (Boulenger, 1895) – long lipinia
- Lipinia macrotympanum (Stoliczka, 1873) – big-eared lipinia
- Lipinia miangensis (F. Werner, 1910) – Werner's lipinia
- Lipinia microcerca (Boettger, 1901) – banded lipinia, Sipora striped skink, common striped skink
- Lipinia nitens (W. Peters, 1871)
- Lipinia occidentalis R. Günther, 2000
- Lipinia pulchella Gray, 1845 – yellow-striped slender tree skink, beautiful lipinia
- Lipinia quadrivittata (W. Peters, 1867) – four-striped lipinia, black-striped slender tree skink
- Lipinia rabori (W. Brown & Alcala, 1956) – Rabor's lipinia, black slender tree skink
- Lipinia relicta (Vinciguerra, 1892) – Vinciguerra's lipinia
- Lipinia rouxi (Hediger, 1934) – Roux's lipinia
- Lipinia sekayuensis Grismer et al., 2014 – Sekayu striped skink
- Lipinia semperi (W. Peters, 1867) – Semper's lipinia
- Lipinia septentrionalis R. Günther, 2000
- Lipinia subvittata (A. Günther, 1873) – striped lipinia
- Lipinia surda Boulenger, 1900 – Malaysian striped skink
- Lipinia trivittata Poyarkov, Geissler, Gorin, Dunayev, Hartmann & Suwannapoom, 2019
- Lipinia vassilievi Poyarkov, Geissler, Gorin, Dunayev, Hartmann & Suwannapoom, 2019
- Lipinia venemai Brongersma, 1953 – Brongersma's lipinia
- Lipinia vittigera (Boulenger, 1894) – banded lipinia, Sipora striped skink, common striped skink
- Lipinia vulcania Girard, 1858 – vulcan lipinia
- Lipinia zamboangensis (W. Brown & Alcala, 1963) – Zamboang lipinia, rusty tree skink

Nota bene: A binomial authority in parentheses indicates that the species was originally described in a genus other than Lipinia.
