= Lipinia septentrionalis =

Conservation status
- Least Concern (IUCN 3.1)

Scientific classification
- Kingdom: Animalia
- Phylum: Chordata
- Class: Reptilia
- Order: Squamata
- Family: Scincidae
- Genus: Lipinia
- Species: L. septentrionalis

Binomial name
- Lipinia septentrionalis Günther, 2000

Species of lizard

Lipinia septentrionalis is a species of skink. It is endemic to New Guinea and is found in both Western New Guinea (Indonesia) and in Papua New Guinea.
