= Lipinia miangensis =

Conservation status
- Data Deficient (IUCN 3.1)

Scientific classification
- Kingdom: Animalia
- Phylum: Chordata
- Class: Reptilia
- Order: Squamata
- Suborder: Scinciformata
- Infraorder: Scincomorpha
- Family: Sphenomorphidae
- Genus: Lipinia
- Species: L. miangensis

Binomial name
- Lipinia miangensis (Werner, 1910)
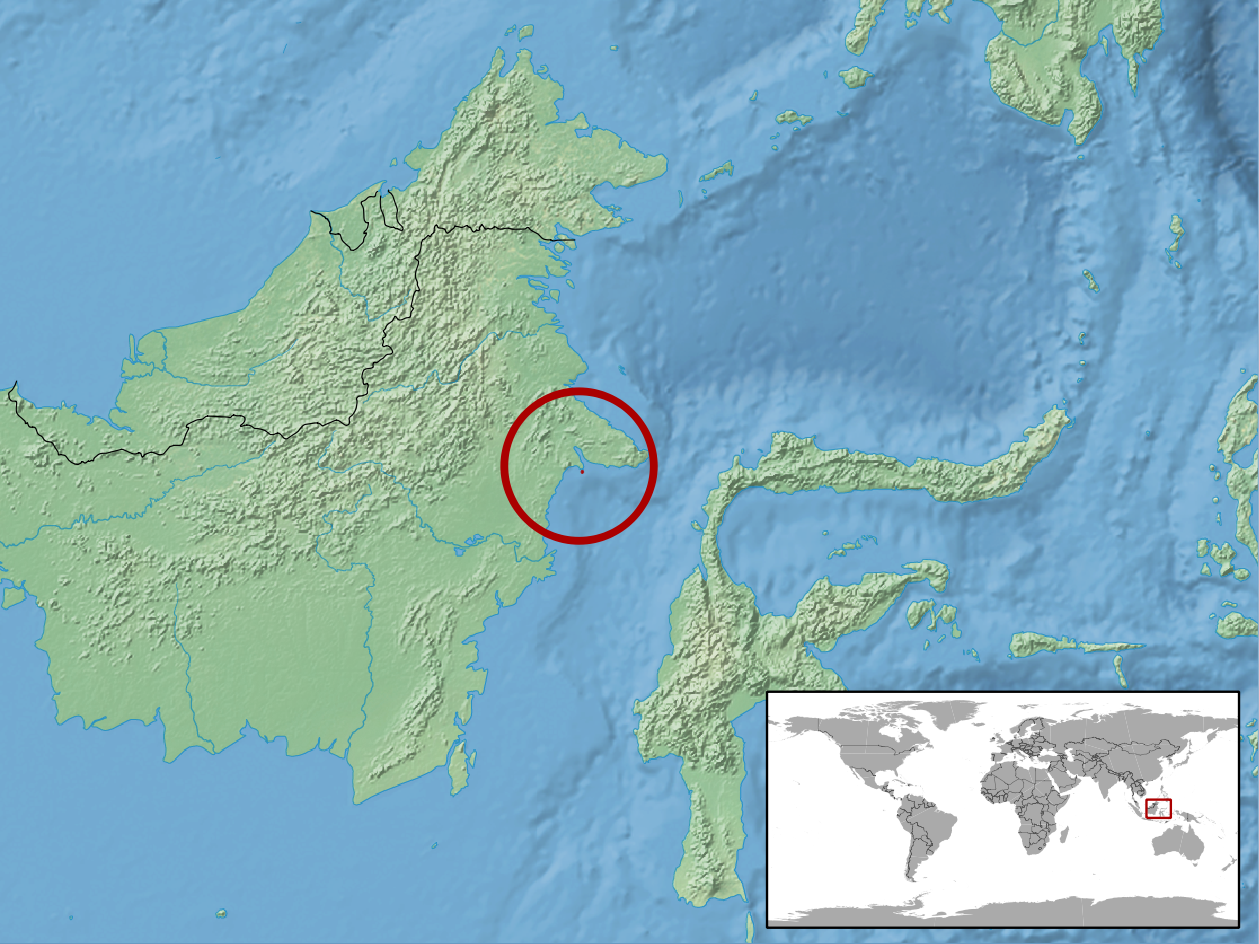

Species of lizard

Werner's lipinia (Lipinia miangensis) is a species of skink found in Indonesia.
