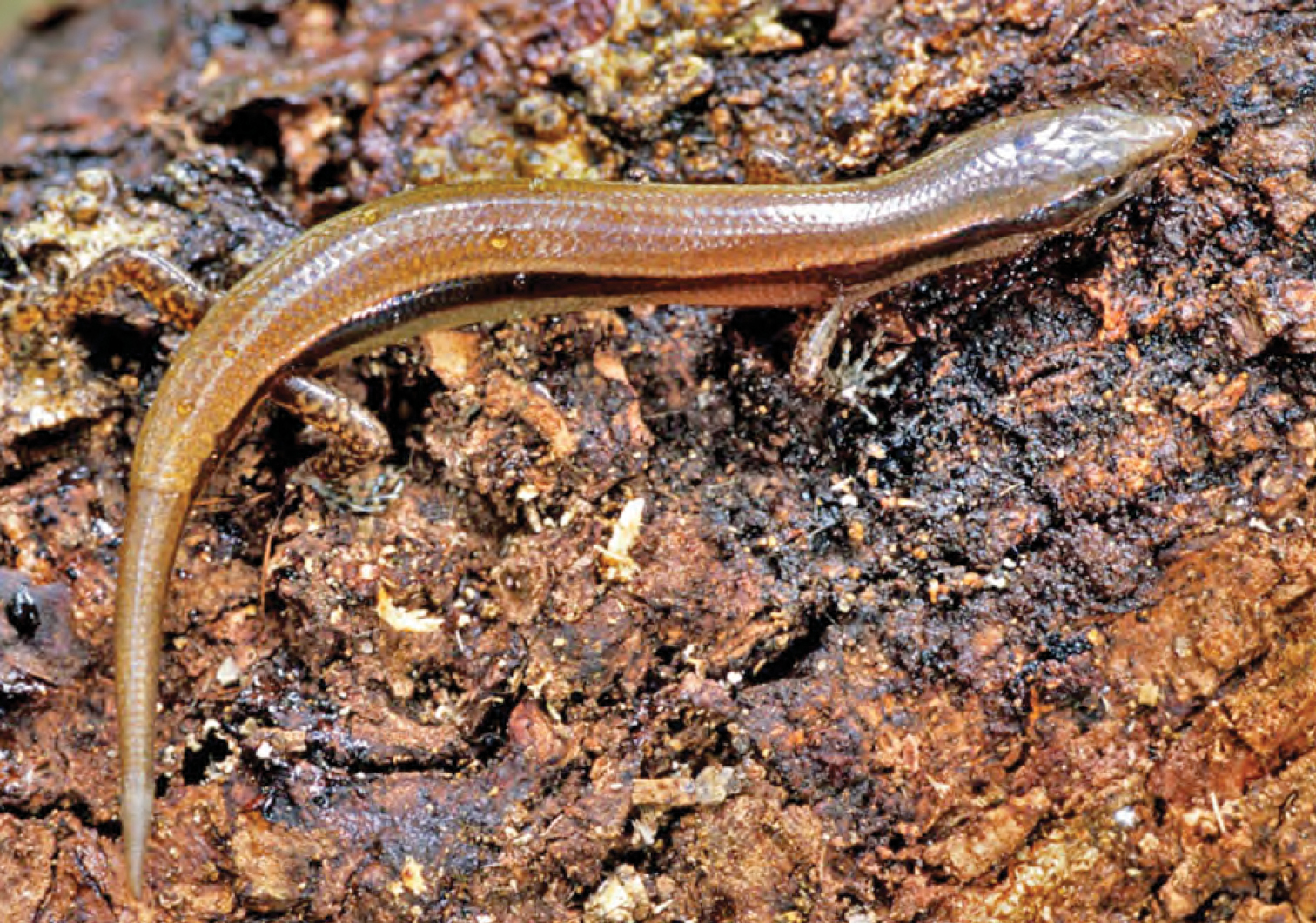

Conservation status
- Data Deficient (IUCN 3.1)

Scientific classification
- Kingdom: Animalia
- Phylum: Chordata
- Class: Reptilia
- Order: Squamata
- Family: Scincidae
- Genus: Lipinia
- Species: L. vulcania

Binomial name
- Lipinia vulcania (Girard, 1857)
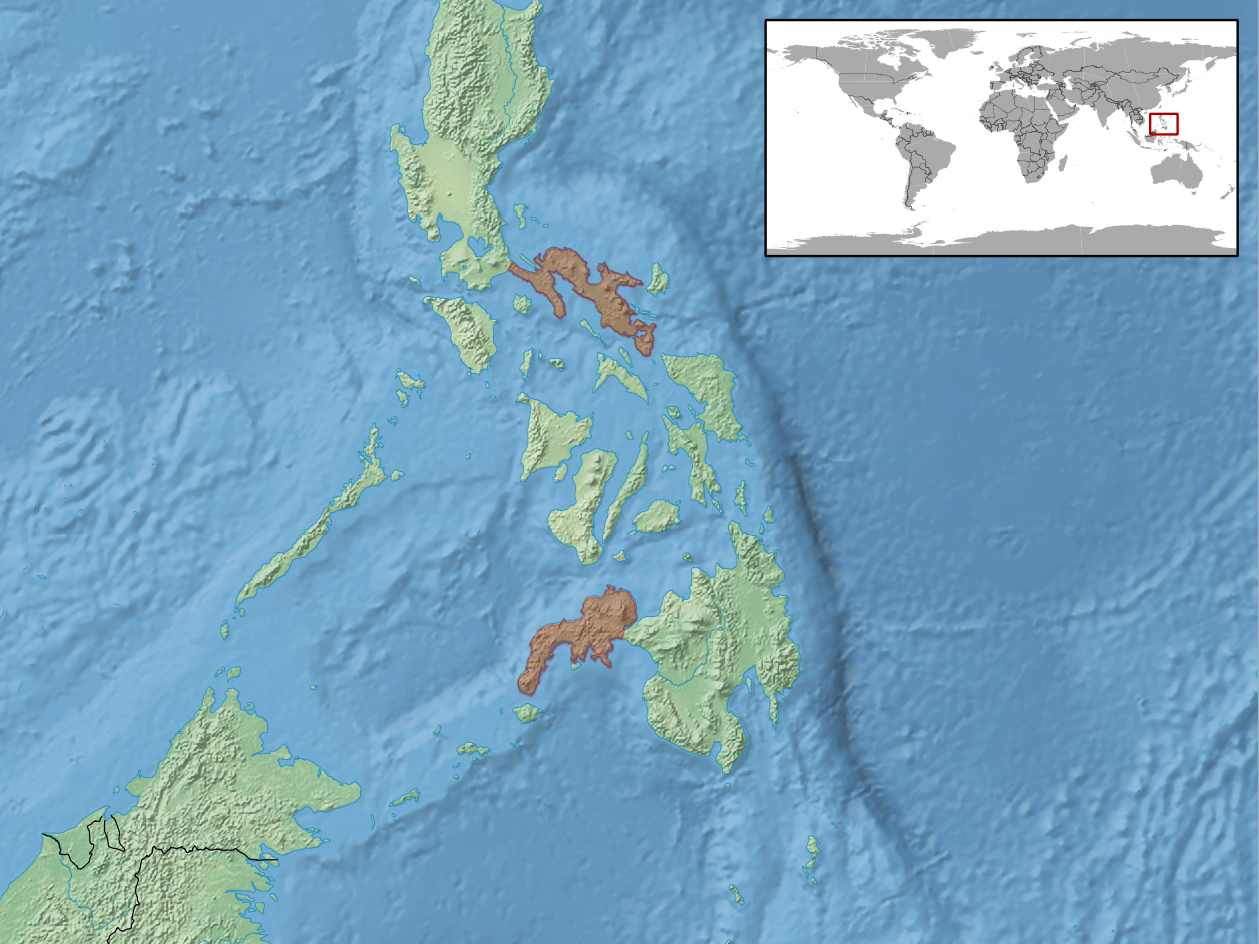

= Lipinia vulcania =

Species of lizard

Lipinia vulcania, also known as the vulcan lipinia, is a species of skink endemic to the Philippines. It is known from two specimens: the holotype was collected at ca. 1700 m above sea level on Mindanao Island in 1857, and another one in southern Luzon in 1956.
