= Lipinia semperi =

Conservation status
- Data Deficient (IUCN 3.1)

Scientific classification
- Kingdom: Animalia
- Phylum: Chordata
- Class: Reptilia
- Order: Squamata
- Suborder: Scinciformata
- Infraorder: Scincomorpha
- Family: Sphenomorphidae
- Genus: Lipinia
- Species: L. semperi

Binomial name
- Lipinia semperi (Peters, 1867)
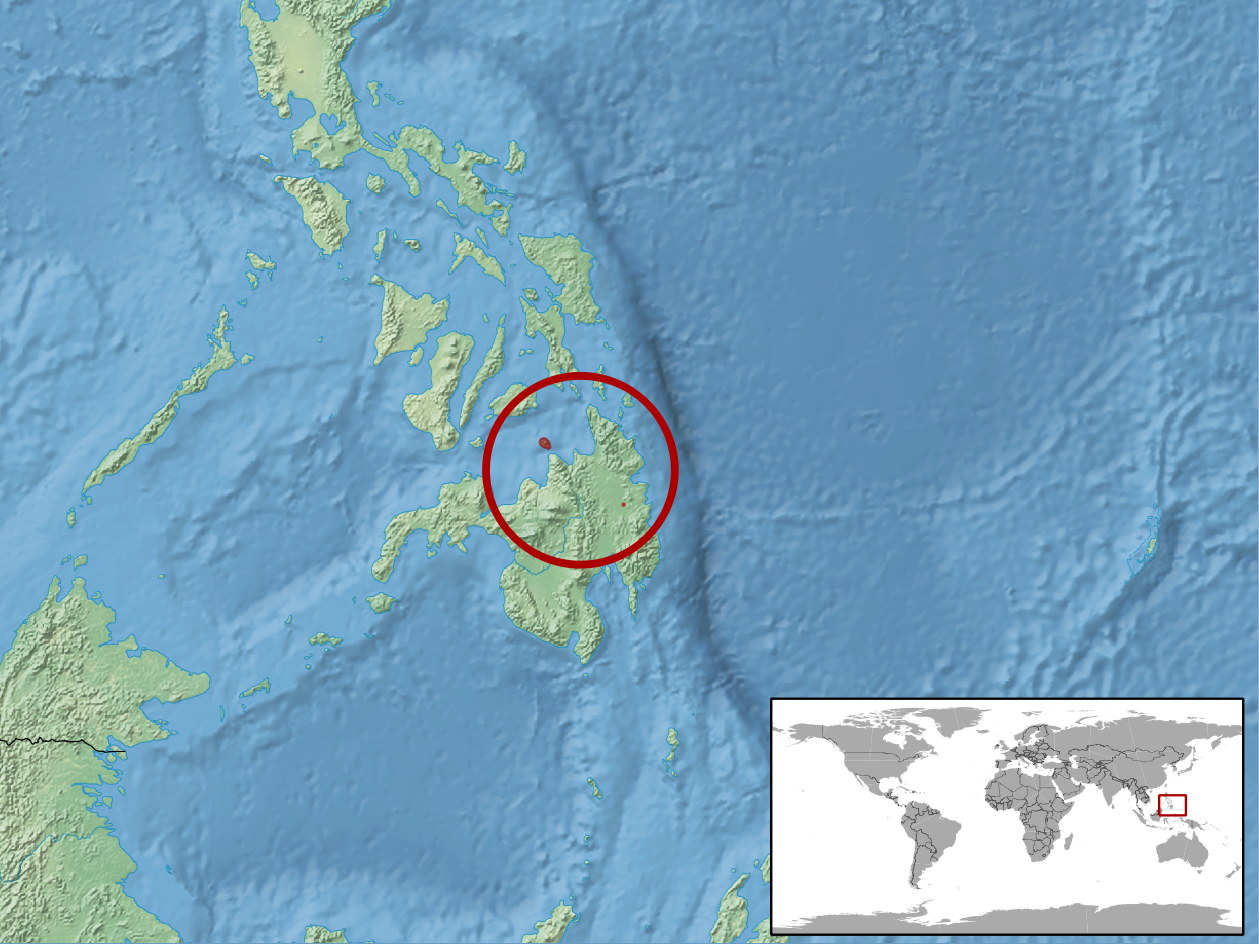

Species of lizard

Semper's lipinia (Lipinia semperi) is a species of skink found in the Philippines.
