= Lipinia infralineolata =

Conservation status
- Vulnerable (IUCN 3.1)

Scientific classification
- Kingdom: Animalia
- Phylum: Chordata
- Class: Reptilia
- Order: Squamata
- Suborder: Scinciformata
- Infraorder: Scincomorpha
- Family: Sphenomorphidae
- Genus: Lipinia
- Species: L. infralineolata

Binomial name
- Lipinia infralineolata (Günther, 1873)
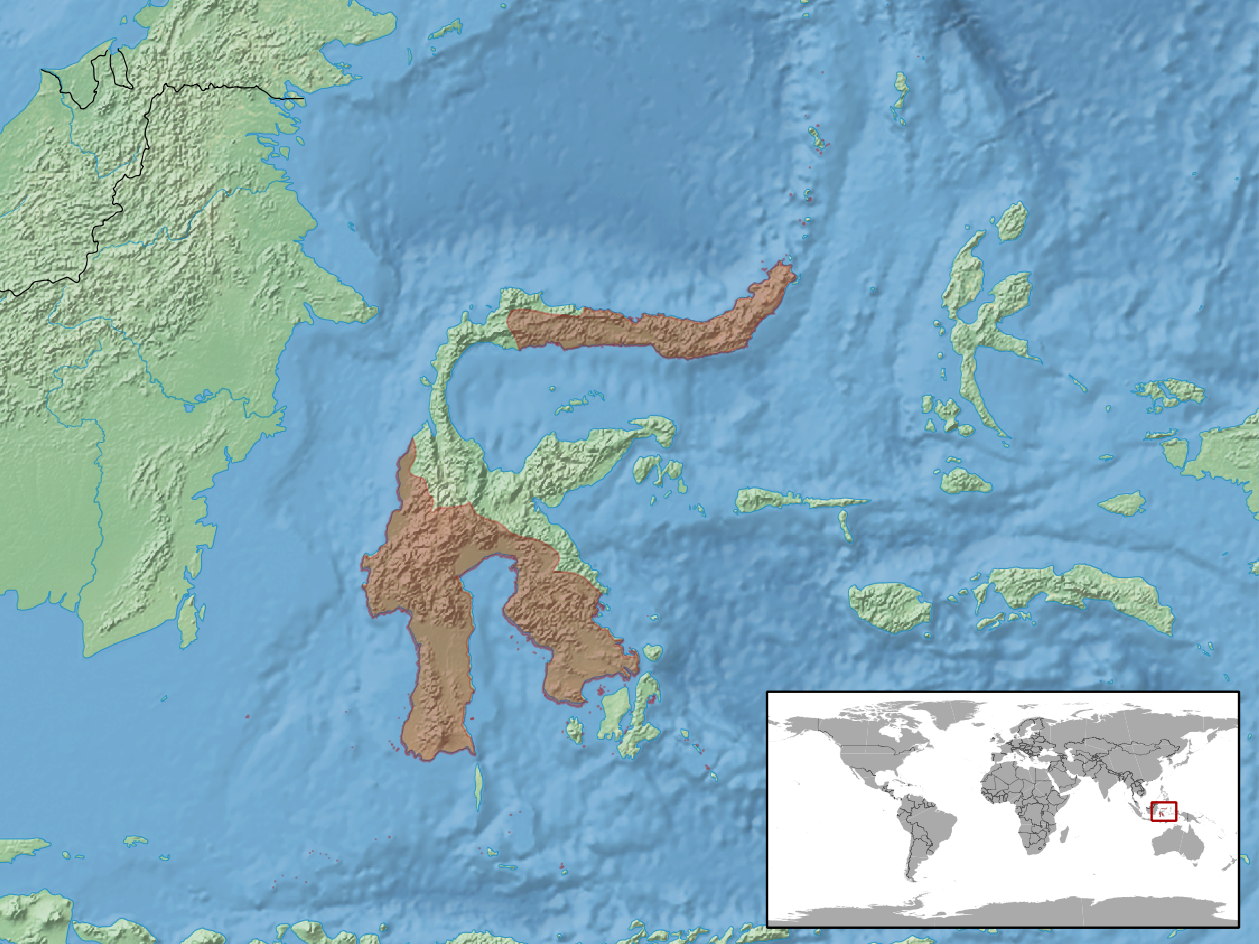

Species of lizard

Lipinia infralineolata is a species of skink found in Indonesia.
