= Lipinia longiceps =

Conservation status
- Least Concern (IUCN 3.1)

Scientific classification
- Kingdom: Animalia
- Phylum: Chordata
- Class: Reptilia
- Order: Squamata
- Suborder: Scinciformata
- Infraorder: Scincomorpha
- Family: Sphenomorphidae
- Genus: Lipinia
- Species: L. longiceps

Binomial name
- Lipinia longiceps (Boulenger, 1895)

Species of lizard

The long lipinia (Lipinia longiceps) is a species of skink found in Papua New Guinea. It was first described in 1895 by Belgian-British zoologist George Albert Boulenger.
