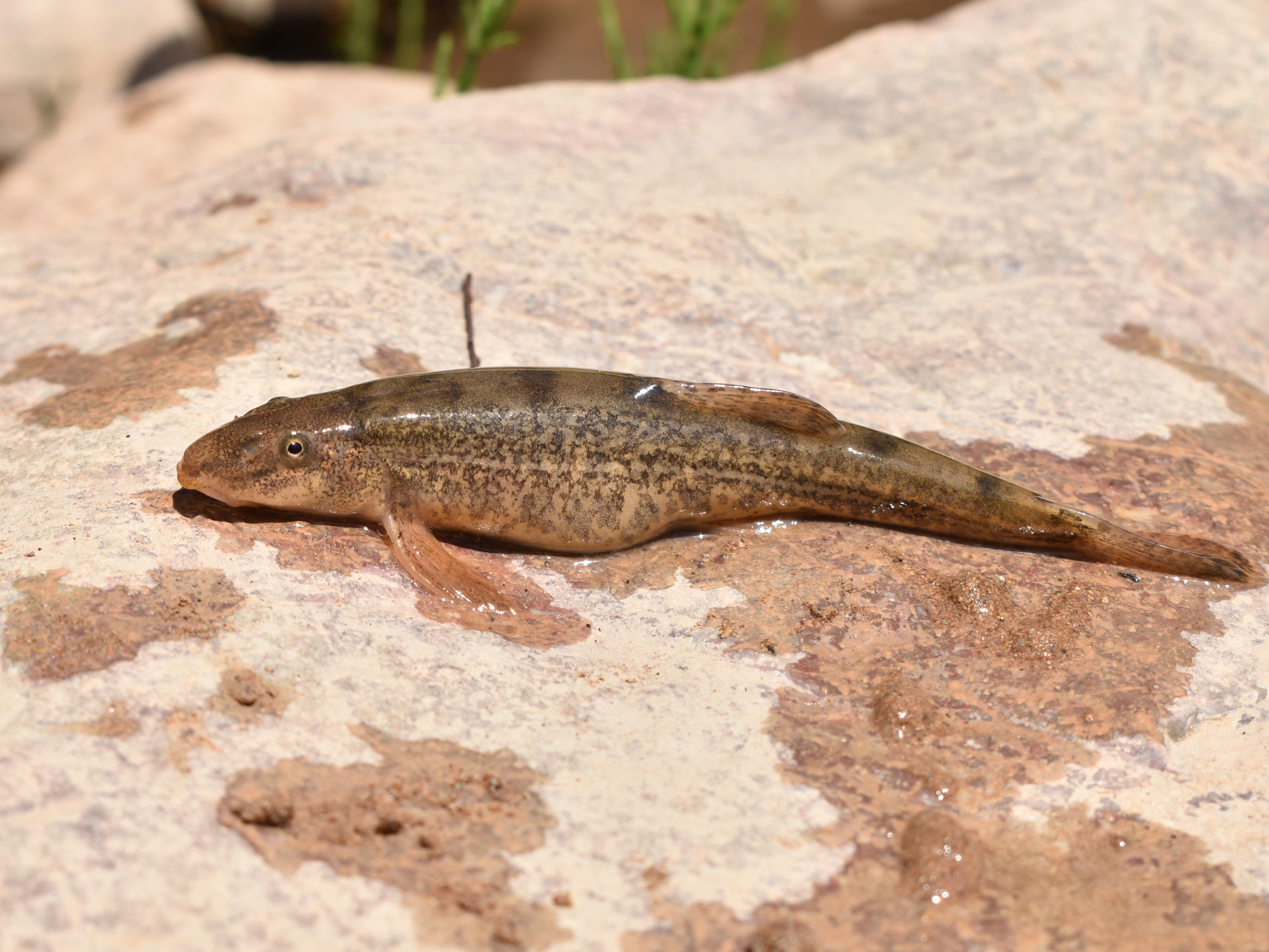

Conservation status
- Least Concern (IUCN 3.1)

Scientific classification
- Kingdom: Animalia
- Phylum: Chordata
- Class: Actinopterygii
- Order: Cypriniformes
- Family: Nemacheilidae
- Genus: Triplophysa
- Species: T. stolickai

Binomial name
- Triplophysa stolickai (Steindachner, 1866)

Synonyms
- Cobitis elegans Kessler, 1874; Cobitis stoličkai protonym; Nemacheilus stoliczkae; Triplophysa stoliczkai

= Tibetan stone loach =

Species of fish

The Tibetan stone loach (Triplophysa stolickai) is a species of ray-finned fish in the family Nemacheilidae. The specific name is sometimes spelled stoliczkae but the original spelling used by Steindachner is stoličkai. It is found in southern and central Asia.

== Etymology ==
The stone loach is named in honor of paleontologist Ferdinand Stoliczka (1838–1874). Stoliczka was the one who collected the type specimen.
