= Lipinia occidentalis =

Scientific classification
- Kingdom: Animalia
- Phylum: Chordata
- Class: Reptilia
- Order: Squamata
- Family: Scincidae
- Genus: Lipinia
- Species: L. occidentalis

Binomial name
- Lipinia occidentalis Günther, 2000

Species of lizard

Lipinia occidentalis is a species of skink found in Papua New Guinea.
