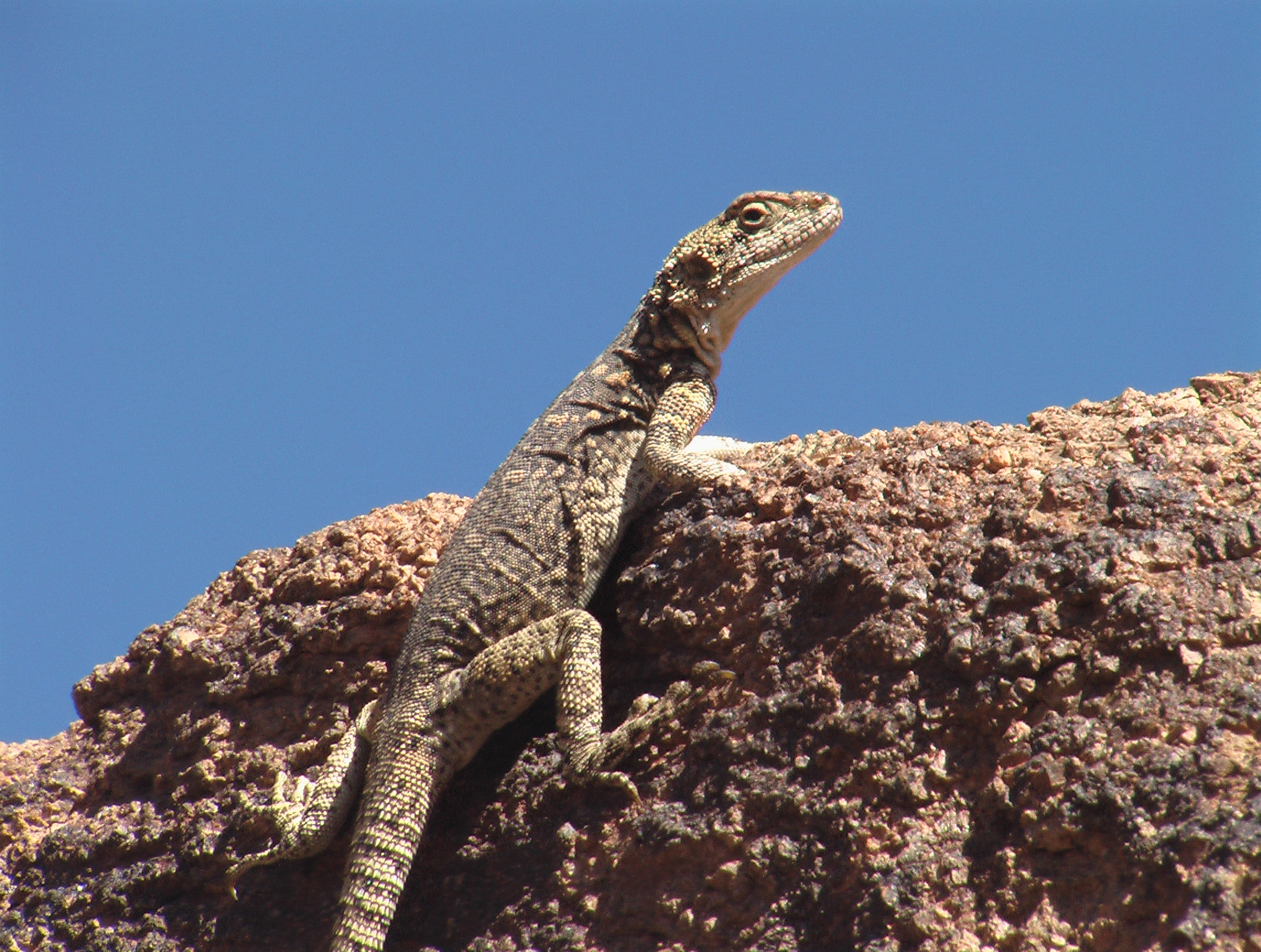

Conservation status
- Least Concern (IUCN 3.1)

Scientific classification
- Kingdom: Animalia
- Phylum: Chordata
- Class: Reptilia
- Order: Squamata
- Suborder: Iguania
- Family: Agamidae
- Genus: Paralaudakia
- Species: P. stoliczkana

Binomial name
- Paralaudakia stoliczkana (Blanford, 1875)

Synonyms
- Stellio stoliczkanus Blanford, 1875; Agama stoliczkana — Boulenger, 1885; Agama tarimensis Zugmayer, 1909; Laudakia stoliczkana — Macey et al., 2000; Paralaudakia stoliczkana — Baig et al., 2012

= Paralaudakia stoliczkana =

Mongolia rock agama

Species of lizard

Paralaudakia stoliczkana (common name Mongolia rock agama) is a species of lizard in the family Agamidae. The species is native to Xinjiang and Gansu provinces in China, the western parts of Mongolia, and to Kyrgyzstan. There are two recognized subspecies.

== Etymology ==
The specific name, stoliczkana, is in honor of Moravian zoologist Ferdinand Stoliczka.

== Subspecies ==
The following two subspecies are recognized as being valid.

- Paralaudakia stoliczkana altaica (Munkhbayar & Shagdarsuren, 1970)
- Paralaudakia stoliczkana stoliczkana (Blanford, 1875)

Nota bene: A trinomial authority in parentheses indicates that the subspecies was originally described in a genus other than Paralaudakia.

== Distribution and habitat ==
P. stoliczkana is found in western China, Mongolia, and Kyrgyzstan. Its preferred natural habitats are shrubland, forest, and desert. It occurs in at least one protected area.

== Reproduction ==
P. stoliczkana is oviparous.

== Conservation ==
Though the exact number of individuals of P. stoliczkana is unknown, its population is stable. It occurs in a protected area. The IUCN Red List classes it as of least concern. It is threatened by mining, trapping, and hunting. Both locally and internationally, it is used in medicine and as food.
