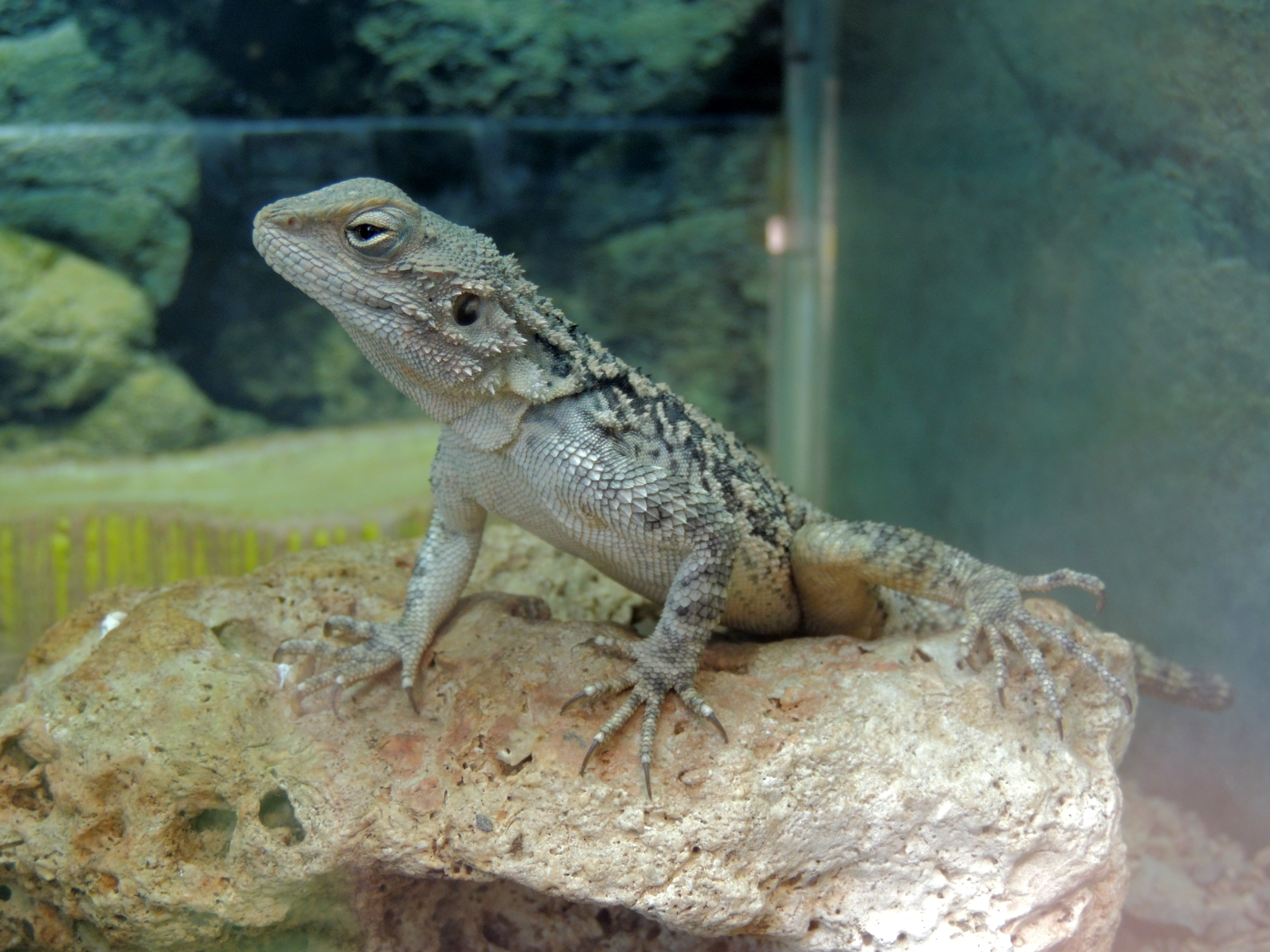

Conservation status
- Least Concern (IUCN 3.1)

Scientific classification
- Kingdom: Animalia
- Phylum: Chordata
- Class: Reptilia
- Order: Squamata
- Suborder: Iguania
- Family: Agamidae
- Genus: Paralaudakia
- Species: P. lehmanni

Binomial name
- Paralaudakia lehmanni (Nikolsky, 1896)

Synonyms
- Stellio lehmanni Nikolsky, 1896; Agama lehmanni (Nikolsky. 1896); Laudakia lehmanni (Nikolsky, 1896)

= Paralaudakia lehmanni =

Species of lizard

Paralaudakia lehmanni, also known commonly as the Turkestan rock agama, is a species of lizard in the family Agamidae. The species is native to Central Asia.

== Etymology ==
The specific name, lehmanni, is in honor of Alexander Lehmann, who was a Russian biologist of German descent.

== Geographic range ==
P. lehmanni is found in Afghanistan, Kyrgyzstan, Tajikistan, Turkmenistan, and Uzbekistan.

== Habitat ==
The preferred natural habitat of P. lehmanni is rocky shrubland, at altitudes of 400–2,600 m (1,300–8,500 ft).

== Reproduction ==
P. lehmanni is oviparous.
