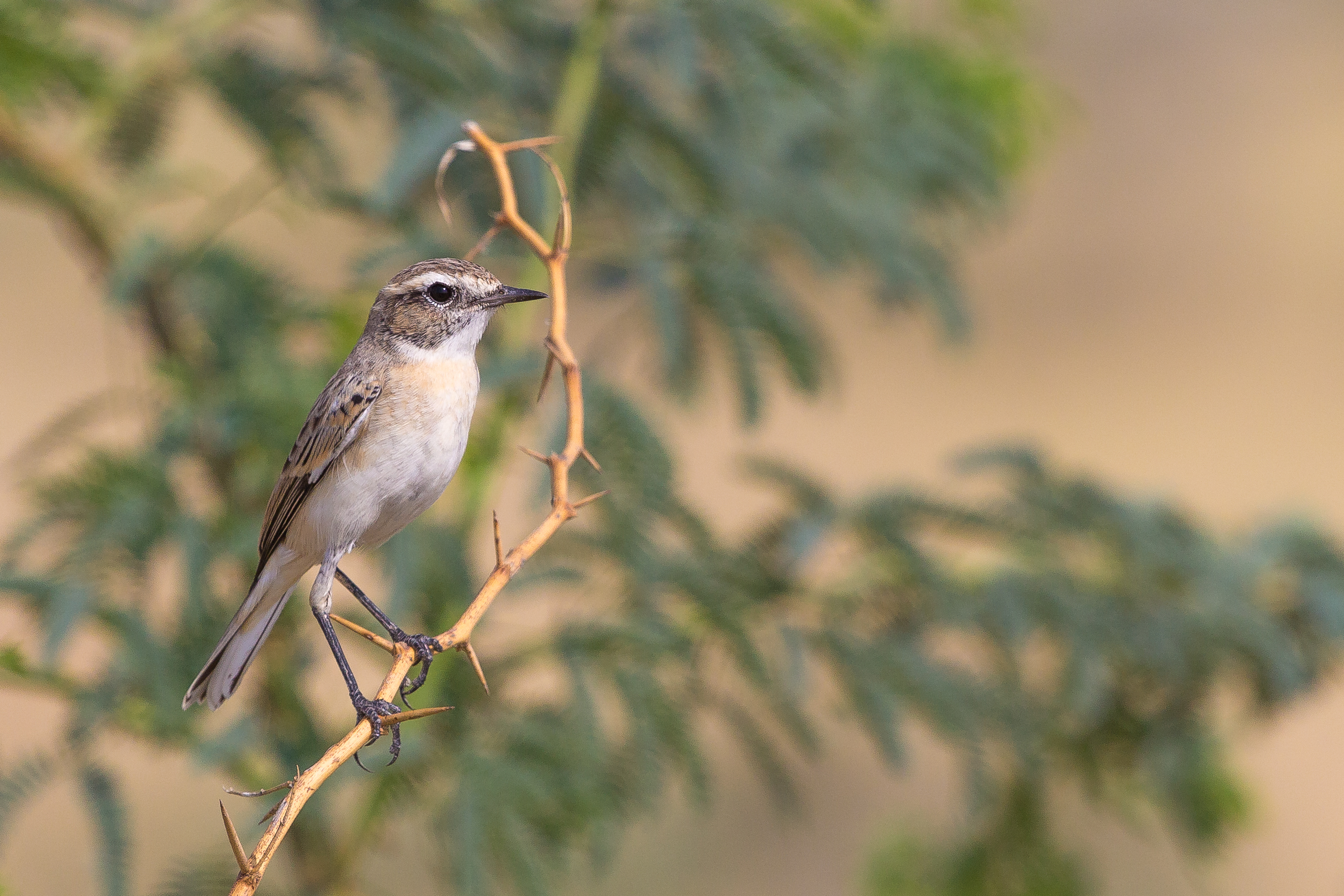
- Male in non-breeding plumage at Tal Chhapar Sanctuary, Rajasthan, India

Conservation status
- Vulnerable (IUCN 3.1)

Scientific classification
- Kingdom: Animalia
- Phylum: Chordata
- Class: Aves
- Order: Passeriformes
- Family: Muscicapidae
- Genus: Saxicola
- Species: S. macrorhynchus

Binomial name
- Saxicola macrorhynchus (Stoliczka, 1872)

Synonyms
- Saxicola macrorhyncha

= White-browed bush chat =

Species of bird

The white-browed bush chat (Saxicola macrorhynchus), (Note: Saxicola is masculine leading to the species epithet ending in -us) also known as Stoliczka's bushchat, is an Old World flycatcher in the genus Saxicola. The alternative name is after the discoverer, geologist and explorer Ferdinand Stoliczka.

This desert specialist has a small, declining population because of agricultural intensification and encroachment, which qualifies it as vulnerable.

The white-browed bush chat is found in an area of semi-arid country in north-western India and eastern Pakistan. It has apparently strayed as far east as the Bharatpur area of Rajasthan and as far south as Goa and Pune, with two simultaneous historical records from southern Afghanistan.

== Gallery ==
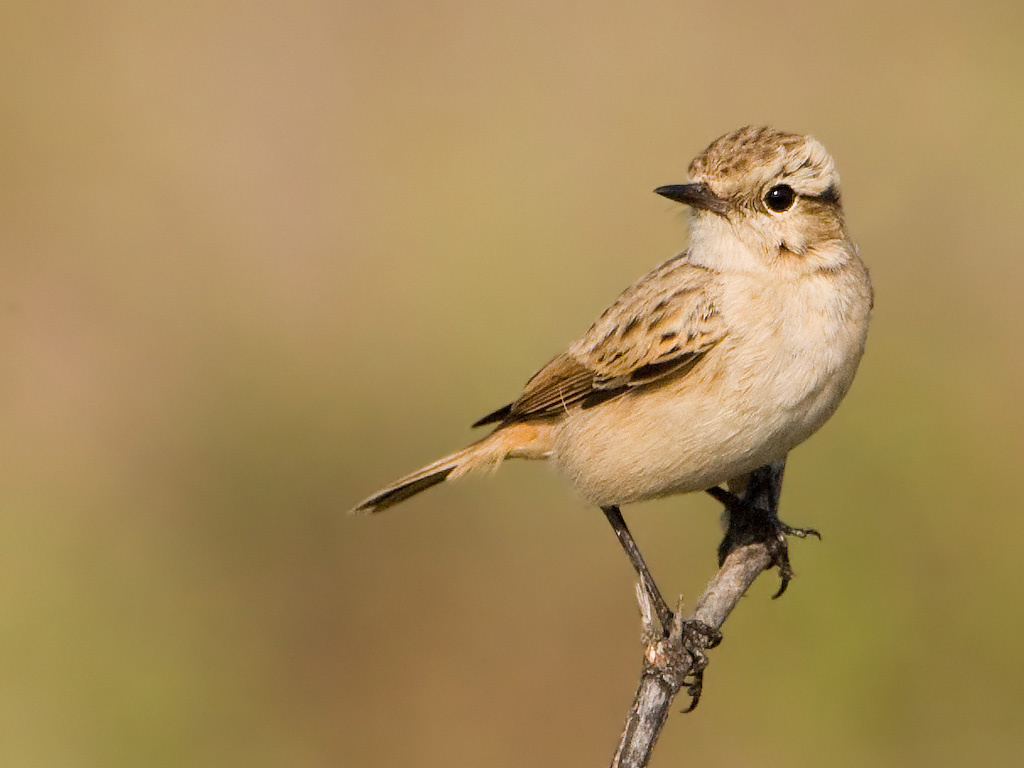
Stolickza's bushchat

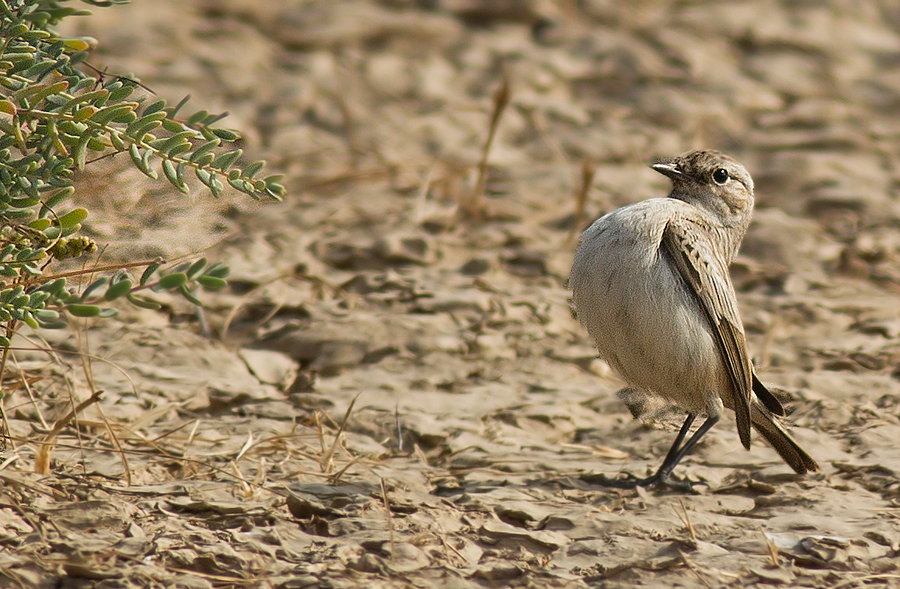
The puff and roll display of white-browed bush chat in Kutch region, India

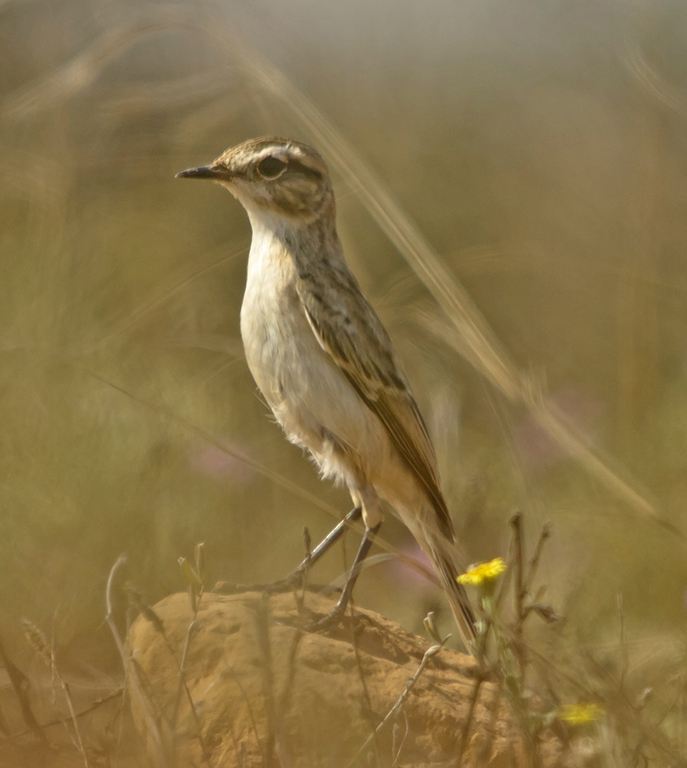
Stolickza's bushchat at Kutch

== Other sources ==
- BirdLife Species Factsheet.
- Red-Data Book Species Information
- Endangered and Threatened Birds of the World, a photo discussion by Don Roberson
- Urquhart, E. & Bowley, A. 2002. Stonechats. A Guide to the Genus Saxicola. Helm. ISBN 0-7136-6024-4
