= Paralaudakia bochariensis =

Conservation status
- Least Concern (IUCN 3.1)

Scientific classification
- Kingdom: Animalia
- Phylum: Chordata
- Class: Reptilia
- Order: Squamata
- Suborder: Iguania
- Family: Agamidae
- Genus: Paralaudakia
- Species: P. bochariensis

Binomial name
- Paralaudakia bochariensis (Nikolsky, 1897)

Species of lizard

Paralaudakia bochariensis, also known as Tajik rock agama or Chernov agama, is an agamid lizard found in Tajikistan, Uzbekistan, Turkmenistan, and Kyrgyzstan.
