= Lipinia vassilievi =

Scientific classification
- Kingdom: Animalia
- Phylum: Chordata
- Class: Reptilia
- Order: Squamata
- Family: Scincidae
- Genus: Lipinia
- Species: L. vassilievi

Binomial name
- Lipinia vassilievi Poyarkov, Geissler, Gorin, Dunayev, Hartmann, & Suwannapoom, 2019

Species of lizard

Lipinia vassilievi is a species of skink. It is endemic to Vietnam.
