= Paralaudakia erythrogaster =

Conservation status
- Least Concern (IUCN 3.1)

Scientific classification
- Kingdom: Animalia
- Phylum: Chordata
- Class: Reptilia
- Order: Squamata
- Suborder: Iguania
- Family: Agamidae
- Genus: Paralaudakia
- Species: P. erythrogaster

Binomial name
- Paralaudakia erythrogaster (Nikolsky, 1896)

Species of lizard

Paralaudakia erythrogaster, the redbelly rock agama, is an agamid lizard found in Iran, Afghanistan, and Turkmenistan.
