= Lipinia relicta =

Scientific classification
- Domain: Eukaryota
- Kingdom: Animalia
- Phylum: Chordata
- Class: Reptilia
- Order: Squamata
- Family: Scincidae
- Genus: Lipinia
- Species: L. relicta

Binomial name
- Lipinia relicta (Vinciguerra, 1892)

Species of lizard

Vinciguerra's lipinia (Lipinia relicta) is a species of skink found in Indonesia.
