= Lipinia rouxi =

Conservation status
- Least Concern (IUCN 3.1)

Scientific classification
- Kingdom: Animalia
- Phylum: Chordata
- Class: Reptilia
- Order: Squamata
- Family: Scincidae
- Genus: Lipinia
- Species: L. rouxi

Binomial name
- Lipinia rouxi (Hediger, 1934)

Synonyms
- Leiolopisma rouxi Hediger, 1934

Species of lizard

Lipinia rouxi, also known as Roux's lipinia, is a species of skink. It is endemic to New Ireland, in the Bismarck Archipelago of Papua New Guinea.
