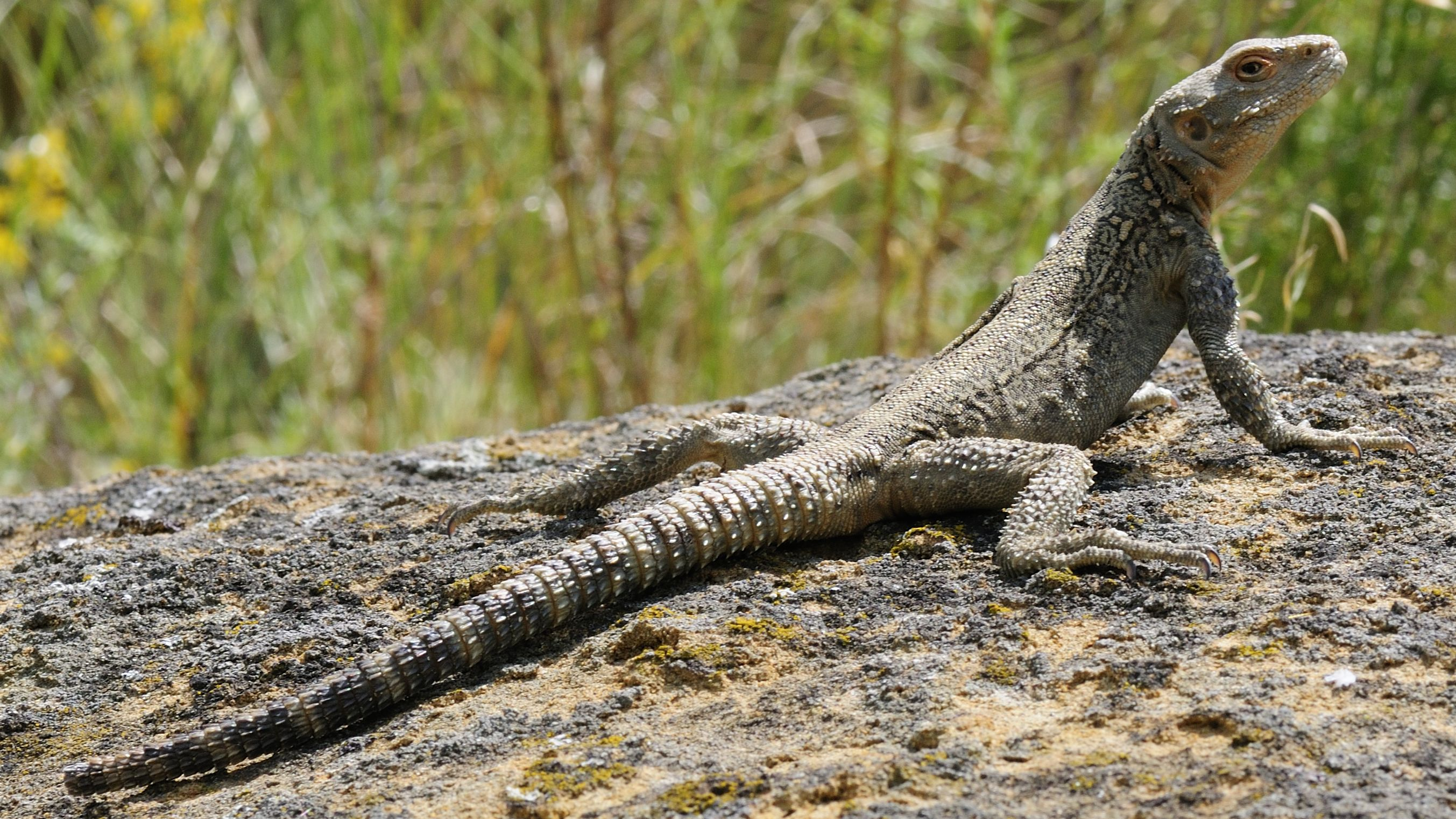
- Paralaudakia caucasia

Scientific classification
- Kingdom: Animalia
- Phylum: Chordata
- Class: Reptilia
- Order: Squamata
- Suborder: Iguania
- Family: Agamidae
- Subfamily: Agaminae
- Genus: Paralaudakia; Baig, Wagner, Ananjeva & Böhme, 2012

Synonyms
- Agama; Laudakia; Stellio

= Paralaudakia =

Genus of lizards

Paralaudakia is a genus of lizards, commonly known as Asian rock agamas, which are endemic to Eurasia.

== Taxonomy ==
All of the species of the genus Paralaudakia are sometimes included in the genus Laudakia, sensu lato. For African agamas see the genera Agama and Acanthocercus.

== Species ==
Listed alphabetically by specific name.

- Paralaudakia badakhshana (S. Anderson & Leviton, 1969) – Badakhshana rock agama
- Paralaudakia bochariensis (Nikolsky, 1897)
- Paralaudakia caucasia (Eichwald, 1831) – Caucasian agama
- Paralaudakia erythrogaster (Nikolsky, 1896) – redbelly rock agama
- Paralaudakia himalayana (Steindachner, 1867) – Himalayan agama
- Paralaudakia lehmanni (Nikolsky, 1896) – Turkestan agama
- Paralaudakia microlepis (Blanford, 1874) – small-scaled agama
- Paralaudakia stoliczkana (Blanford, 1875) – Mongolian rock agama

Nota bene: A binomial authority in parentheses indicates that the species was originally described in a genus other than Paralaudakia.
