= Lipinia surda =

Conservation status
- Data Deficient (IUCN 3.1)

Scientific classification
- Kingdom: Animalia
- Phylum: Chordata
- Class: Reptilia
- Order: Squamata
- Suborder: Scinciformata
- Infraorder: Scincomorpha
- Family: Sphenomorphidae
- Genus: Lipinia
- Species: L. surda

Binomial name
- Lipinia surda Boulenger, 1900

Species of reptile

Lipinia surda, the Malaysian striped skink, is a species of skink found in Malaysia and Thailand.
