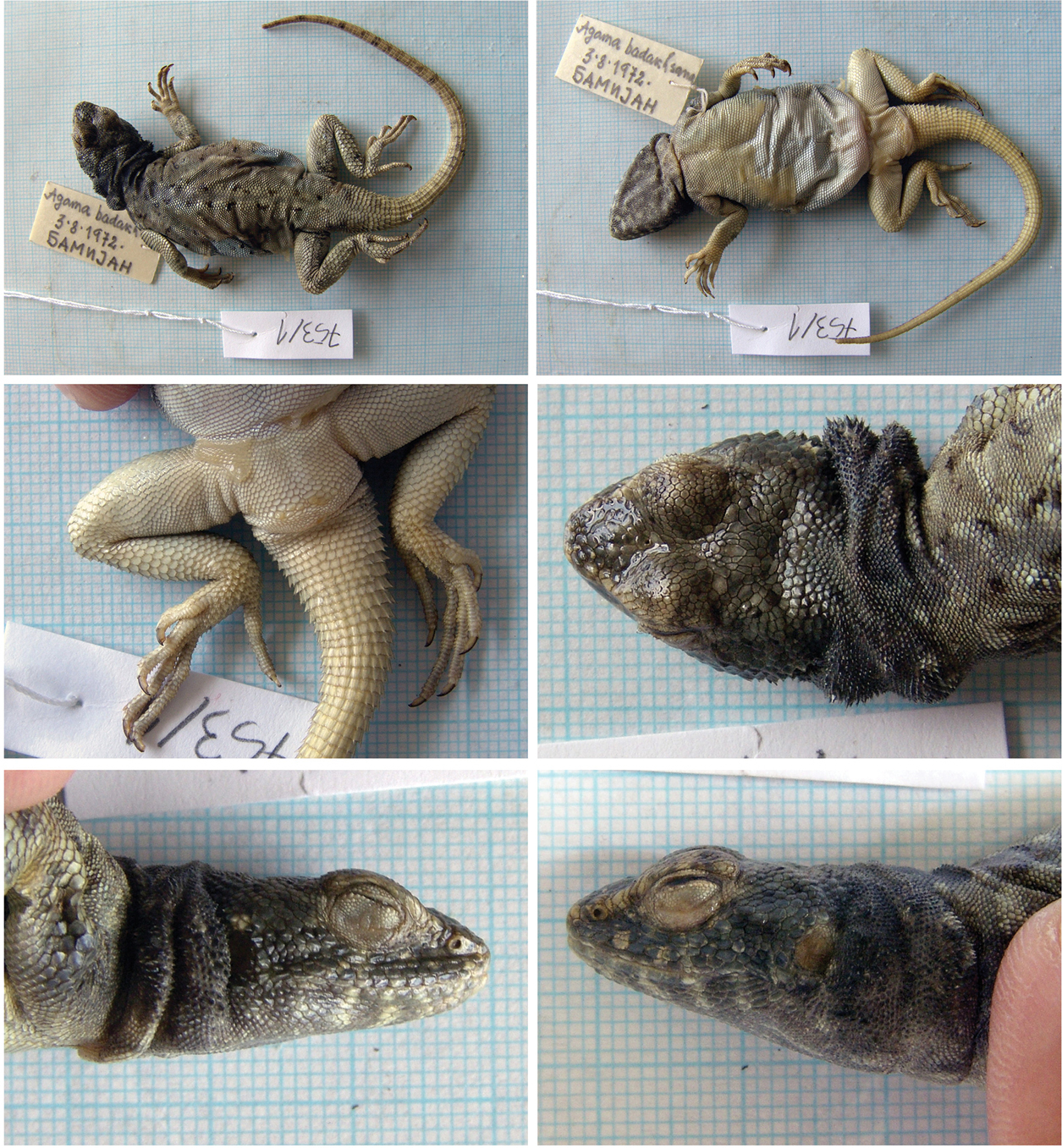

Conservation status
- Least Concern (IUCN 3.1)

Scientific classification
- Kingdom: Animalia
- Phylum: Chordata
- Class: Reptilia
- Order: Squamata
- Suborder: Iguania
- Family: Agamidae
- Genus: Paralaudakia
- Species: P. badakhshana

Binomial name
- Paralaudakia badakhshana (Anderson & Leviton, 1969)

Synonyms
- Agama badakhshana Stellio badakhshana Laudakia badakhshana

= Badakhshana rock agama =

Species of lizard

The Badakhshana rock agama (Paralaudakia badakhshana) is an agamid lizard found in NE Afghanistan, N Pakistan, Kashmir, China (Xinjiang), SE Turkmenistan, eastward through Tajikistan to W Kyrgyzstan.

Its type locality is Mazar-i-Sharif, northern Afghanistan, 36° 34' N, 67° 05' E, 457 m elevation.
