= Lipinia auriculata =

Conservation status
- Least Concern (IUCN 3.1)

Scientific classification
- Kingdom: Animalia
- Phylum: Chordata
- Class: Reptilia
- Order: Squamata
- Family: Scincidae
- Genus: Lipinia
- Species: L. auriculata

Binomial name
- Lipinia auriculata (Taylor, 1917)
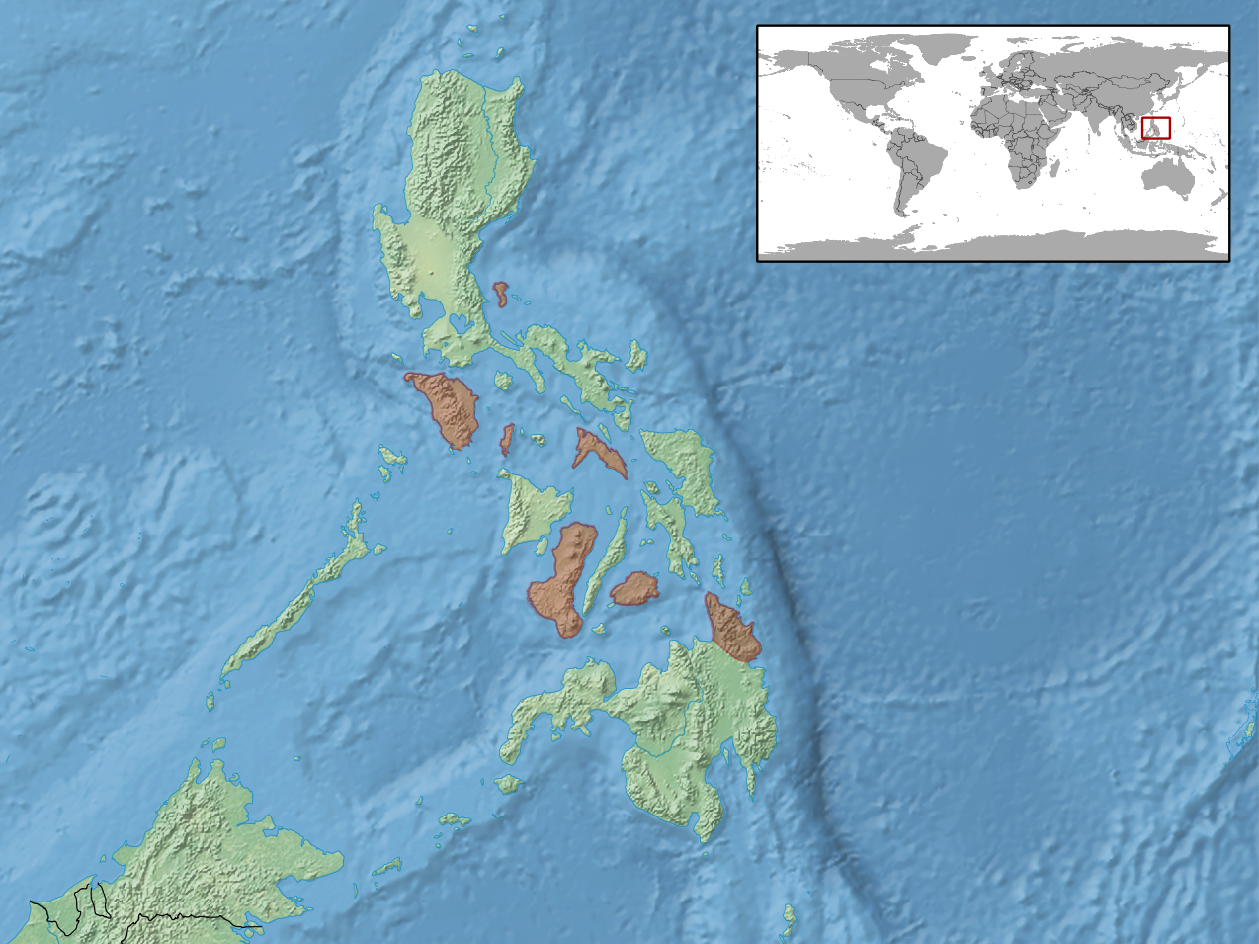

Species of lizard

Lipinia auriculata, also known as the Taylor's lipinia, is a species of skink. It is endemic to the Philippines.
