= Lipinia leptosoma =

Conservation status
- Near Threatened (IUCN 3.1)

Scientific classification
- Kingdom: Animalia
- Phylum: Chordata
- Class: Reptilia
- Order: Squamata
- Family: Scincidae
- Genus: Lipinia
- Species: L. leptosoma

Binomial name
- Lipinia leptosoma (Brown & Fehlmann, 1958)

Synonyms
- Aulacoplax leptosoma Brown & Fehlmann, 1958

Species of lizard

Lipinia leptosoma, also known as the slender lipinia or Pandanus skink, is a species of skink. It is endemic to Palau.
