= Lipinia trivittata =

Scientific classification
- Kingdom: Animalia
- Phylum: Chordata
- Class: Reptilia
- Order: Squamata
- Family: Scincidae
- Genus: Lipinia
- Species: L. trivittata

Binomial name
- Lipinia trivittata Poyarkov, Geissler, Gorin, Dunayev, Hartmann, & Suwannapoom, 2019

Species of lizard

Lipinia trivittata is a species of skink found in Vietnam and Cambodia.
