= Lipinia venemai =

Conservation status
- Data Deficient (IUCN 3.1)

Scientific classification
- Kingdom: Animalia
- Phylum: Chordata
- Class: Reptilia
- Order: Squamata
- Family: Scincidae
- Genus: Lipinia
- Species: L. venemai

Binomial name
- Lipinia venemai Brongersma, 1953

Species of lizard

Lipinia venemai, also known as Brongersma's lipinia, is a species of skink endemic to Western New Guinea (Indonesia).
