= Lipinia sekayuensis =

Conservation status
- Least Concern (IUCN 3.1)

Scientific classification
- Kingdom: Animalia
- Phylum: Chordata
- Class: Reptilia
- Order: Squamata
- Suborder: Scinciformata
- Infraorder: Scincomorpha
- Family: Sphenomorphidae
- Genus: Lipinia
- Species: L. sekayuensis

Binomial name
- Lipinia sekayuensis Grismer, Ismail, Awang, Rizal, & Ahmad, 2014

Species of reptile

Lipinia sekayuensis, also known as the Sekayu striped skink , is a species of skink. It is endemic to Peninsular Malaysia.
