= Lipinia rabori =

Conservation status
- Data Deficient (IUCN 3.1)

Scientific classification
- Kingdom: Animalia
- Phylum: Chordata
- Class: Reptilia
- Order: Squamata
- Family: Scincidae
- Genus: Lipinia
- Species: L. rabori

Binomial name
- Lipinia rabori (Brown & Alcala, 1956)
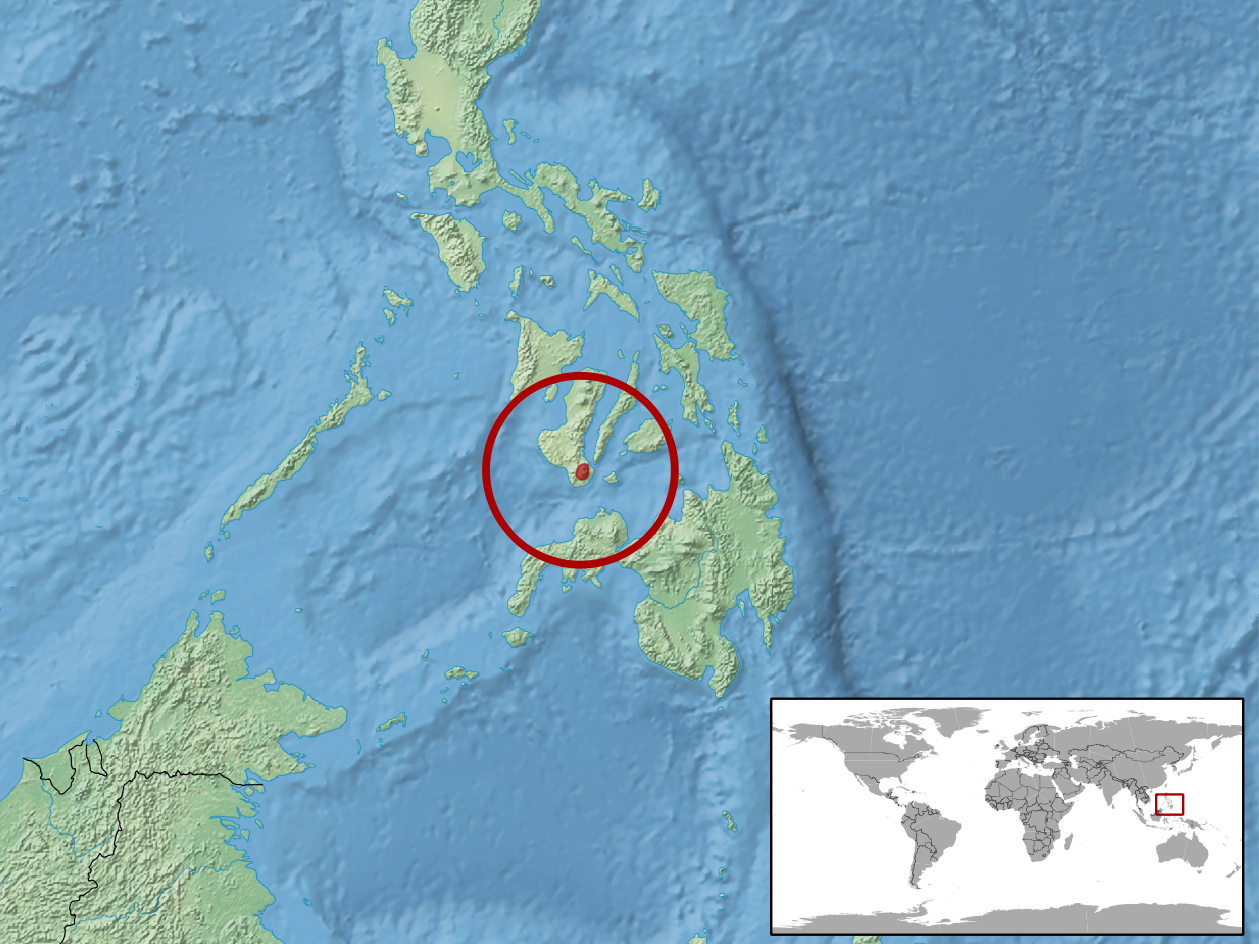

Species of lizard

Rabor's lipinia or black slender tree skink (Lipinia rabori) is a species of skink found in the Philippines.
