= Lipinia nitens =

Conservation status
- Data Deficient (IUCN 3.1)

Scientific classification
- Kingdom: Animalia
- Phylum: Chordata
- Class: Reptilia
- Order: Squamata
- Suborder: Scinciformata
- Infraorder: Scincomorpha
- Family: Sphenomorphidae
- Genus: Lipinia
- Species: L. nitens

Binomial name
- Lipinia nitens (Peters, 1871)

Species of lizard

Lipinia nitens is a species of skink found in Malaysia.
