= Lipinia subvittata =

Scientific classification
- Kingdom: Animalia
- Phylum: Chordata
- Class: Reptilia
- Order: Squamata
- Family: Scincidae
- Genus: Lipinia
- Species: L. subvittata

Binomial name
- Lipinia subvittata (Günther, 1873)

Synonyms
- Cophoscincus subvittatus Günther, 1873

Species of reptile

Lipinia subvittata, the striped lipinia, is a species of skink found in the Philippines and Sulawesi (Indonesia).
