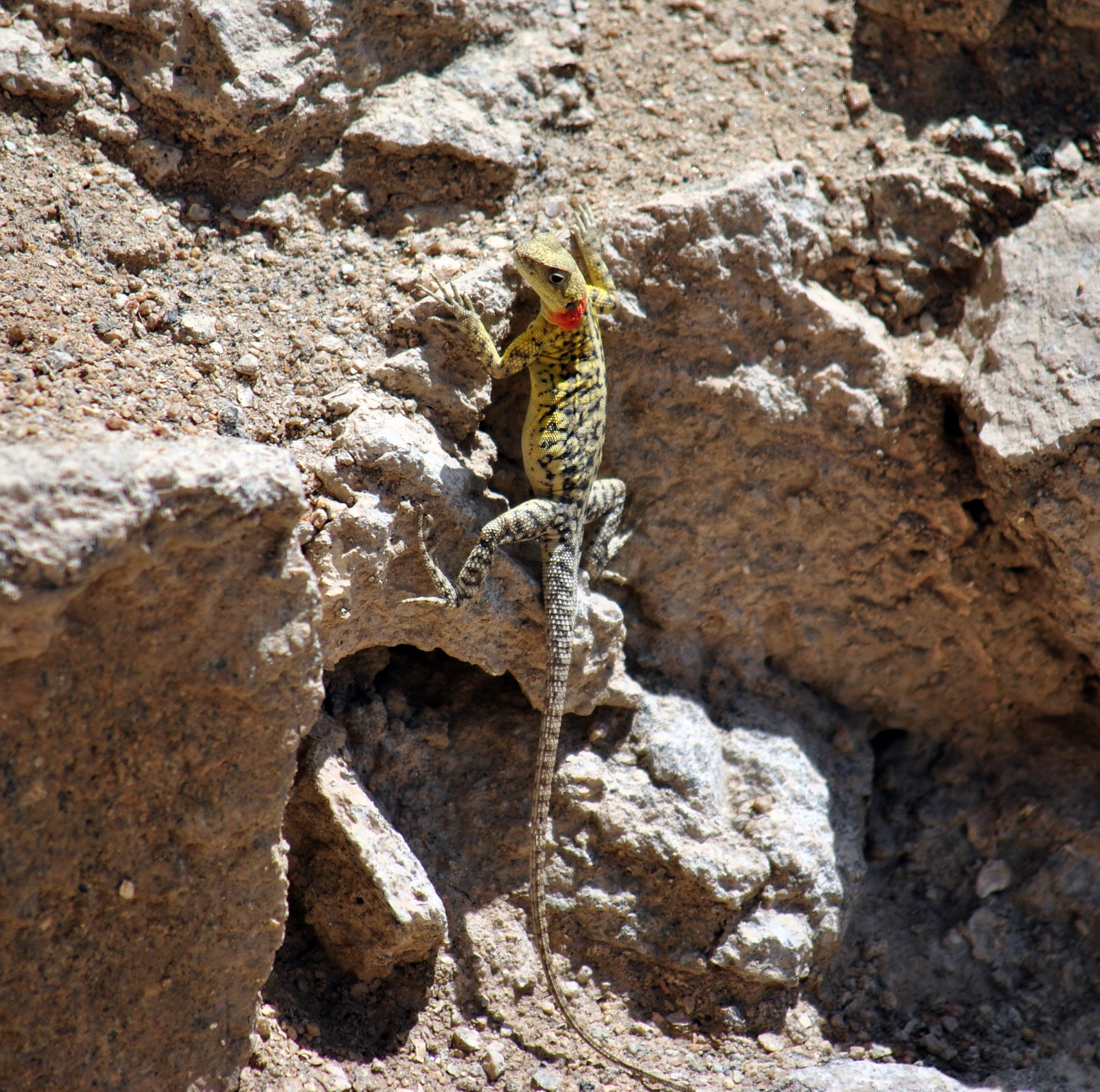

Conservation status
- Least Concern (IUCN 3.1)

Scientific classification
- Kingdom: Animalia
- Phylum: Chordata
- Class: Reptilia
- Order: Squamata
- Suborder: Iguania
- Family: Agamidae
- Genus: Paralaudakia
- Species: P. himalayana

Binomial name
- Paralaudakia himalayana (Steindachner, 1867)

Synonyms
- Stellio bochariensis Stellio himalayanus Laudakia himalayana

= Paralaudakia himalayana =

Himalayan agama

Species of lizard

The Himalayan agama (Paralaudakia himalayana) is an agamid lizard found in Central Asia and South Asia.

== Description ==
Head much depressed; snout slightly longer than diameter of orbit; nostril lateral, below the canthus rostralis, slightly tubular. Upper head-scales smooth; occipital not enlarged; small closely set spinose scales on the head near the ear, and on the neck; ear entirely exposed, larger than the eye-opening. Throat strongly plicate; no gular pouch. Body depressed, with a more or less distinct fold on each side of the back; scales on the neck and sides small, smooth or very feebly keeled, uniform, those on the vertebral region enlarged, equal, roundish-hexagonal, imbricate, smooth or very feebly keeled; ventral scales smooth, a little smaller than the enlarged dorsals. Limbs strong, with compressed digits; the scales on the upper surface large and strongly keeled; fourth finger slightly longer than third; fourth toe considerably longer than third, the extremity of the claw of the latter not reaching the base of the claw of the former; fifth toe extending beyond first. Tail rounded, much depressed at the base, covered with moderate-sized strongly keeled scales arranged in rings; its length equals 2.5 to 3 times the distance from gular fold to vent. Males with a double or triple row of thickened pre-anal scales. Olive above, marbled with black, and generally with round light spots producing a network; sometimes the black spots forming a festooned band on each side of the vertebral line; the male's throat marbled with blackish.

== Distribution ==
NE Afghanistan, N Pakistan, Kashmir, Nepal, China (Xinjiang), SE Turkmenistan, eastward through W Tajikistan to W Kyrgyzstan and E Uzbekistan.

Type locality: Leh and Kargil, Ladakh-Region.
