= Paralaudakia microlepis =

Conservation status
- Least Concern (IUCN 3.1)

Scientific classification
- Kingdom: Animalia
- Phylum: Chordata
- Class: Reptilia
- Order: Squamata
- Suborder: Iguania
- Family: Agamidae
- Genus: Paralaudakia
- Species: P. microlepis

Binomial name
- Paralaudakia microlepis (Blanford, 1874)

Species of lizard

Paralaudakia microlepis, the smallscaled rock agama, is an agamid lizard found in Iran, Afghanistan, Pakistan, and Turkmenistan.
