= Lipinia inconspicua =

Scientific classification
- Domain: Eukaryota
- Kingdom: Animalia
- Phylum: Chordata
- Class: Reptilia
- Order: Squamata
- Family: Scincidae
- Genus: Lipinia
- Species: L. inconspicua

Binomial name
- Lipinia inconspicua (Müller, 1894)

Species of lizard

Lipinia inconspicua, the hidden ground skink, is a species of skink found in Indonesia.
