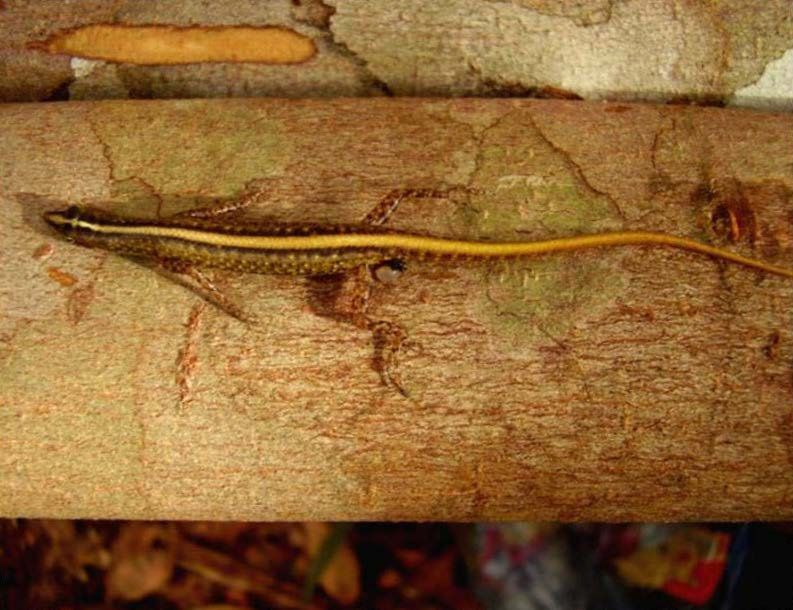

Conservation status
- Least Concern (IUCN 3.1)

Scientific classification
- Kingdom: Animalia
- Phylum: Chordata
- Class: Reptilia
- Order: Squamata
- Family: Scincidae
- Genus: Lipinia
- Species: L. pulchella

Binomial name
- Lipinia pulchella Gray, 1845

Subspecies
- Three, see text.
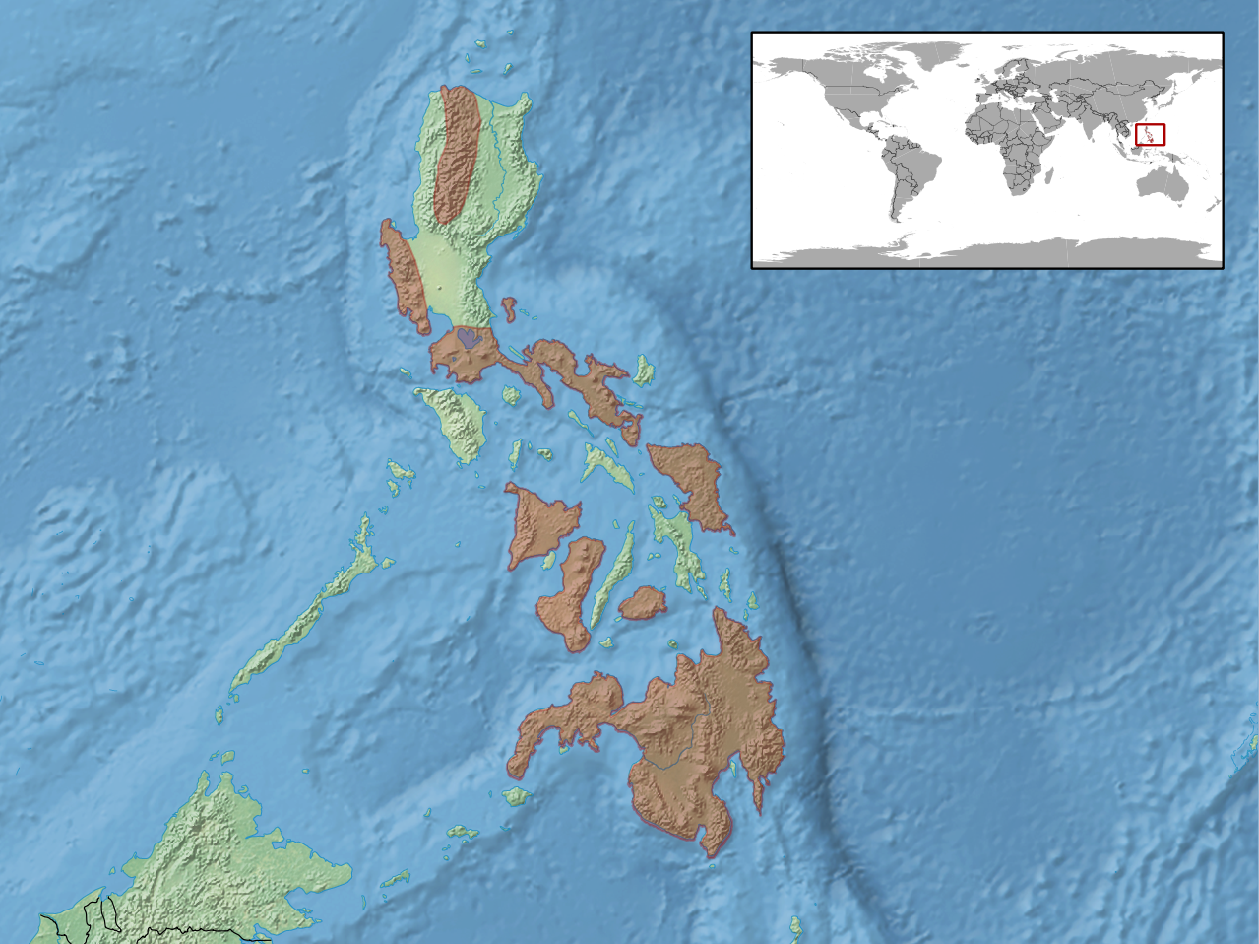

Synonyms
- Lipinia pulchella Gray, 1845; Euprepes pulchellus — Steindachner, 1868; Lygosoma pulchellum — Boulenger, 1887; Leiolopisma pulchellum — Taylor, 1922; Lipinia pulchella — Greer, 1974

= Lipinia pulchella =

Species of lizard

Lipinia pulchella, known commonly as the yellow-striped slender tree skink or beautiful lipinia, is a species of skink, a lizard in the family Scincidae. The species is endemic to the Philippines.

== Subspecies ==
Three subspecies are recognized as being valid, including the nominotypical subspecies.

- Lipinia pulchella levitoni (W.C. Brown & Alcala, 1963)
- Lipinia pulchella pulchella Gray, 1845
- Lipinia pulchella taylori (W.C. Brown & Alcala, 1956)

Nota bene: A trinomial authority in parentheses indicates that the subspecies was originally described in a genus other than Lipinia.

== Etymology ==
The specific name, levitoni, is in honor of American herpetologist Alan Edward Leviton (born 1930).

The specific name, taylori, is in honor of American herpetologist Edward Harrison Taylor (1889–1978).

== Habitat ==
L. pulchella is found at elevations of 250–1,100 m (820–3,610 ft) above sea level throughout the whole country of the Philippines, though its three subspecies occupy smaller geographical regions, which do not necessarily overlap. The skink is found on trunks of trees in the dipterocarp or submontane tropical moist forests.

== Reproduction ==
L. pulchella is oviparous.
