= Lipinia zamboangensis =

Conservation status
- Data Deficient (IUCN 3.1)

Scientific classification
- Kingdom: Animalia
- Phylum: Chordata
- Class: Reptilia
- Order: Squamata
- Family: Scincidae
- Genus: Lipinia
- Species: L. zamboangensis

Binomial name
- Lipinia zamboangensis (Brown & Alcala, 1963)
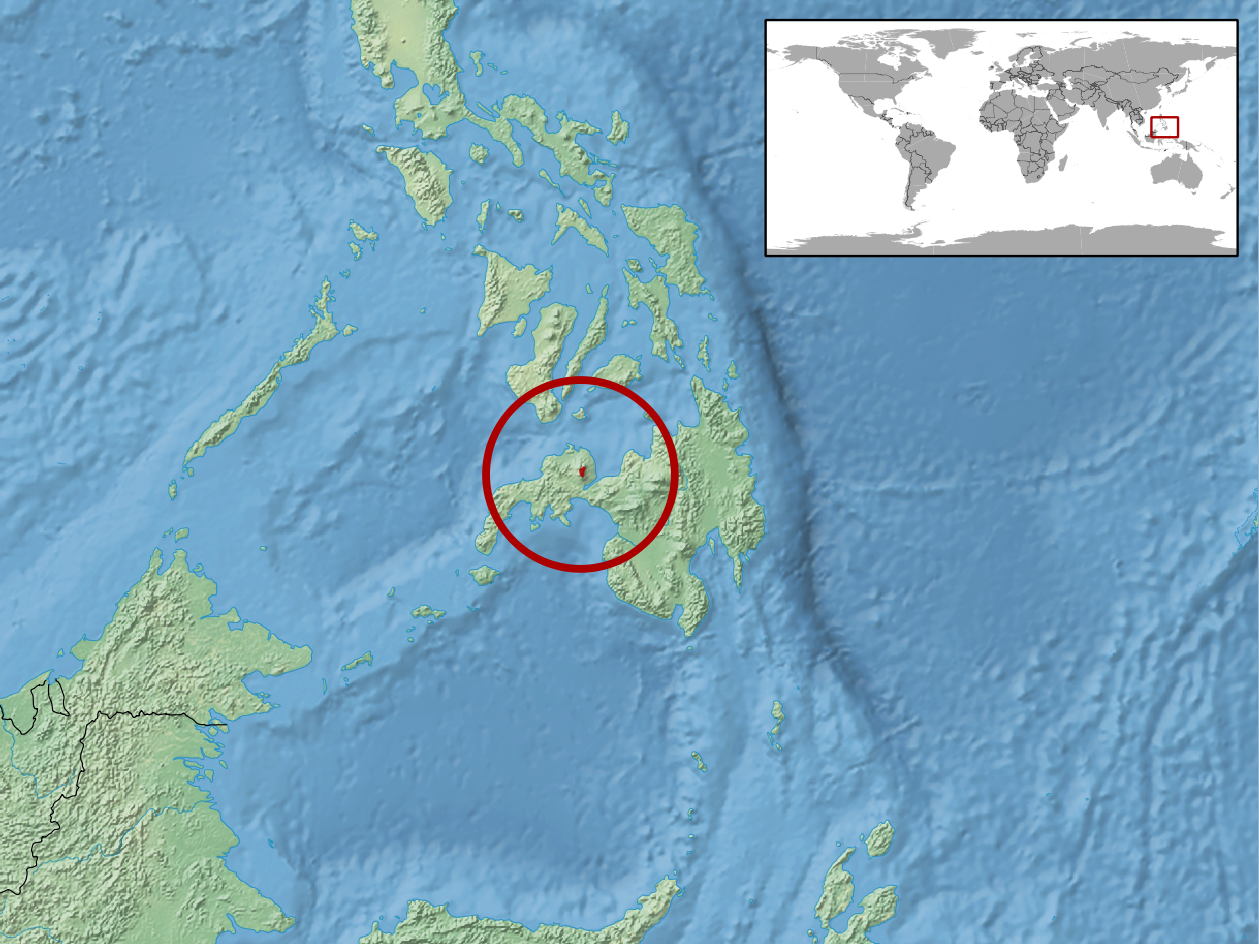

Species of lizard

Lipinia zamboangensis, also known as the Zamboang lipinia or rusty tree skink, is a species of skink endemic to Mindanao, the Philippines.
