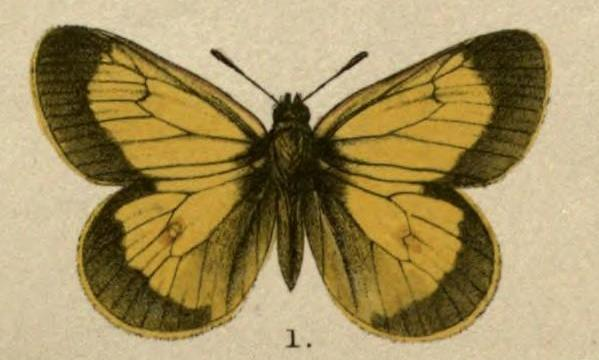

Scientific classification
- Kingdom: Animalia
- Phylum: Arthropoda
- Class: Insecta
- Order: Lepidoptera
- Family: Pieridae
- Genus: Colias
- Species: C. stoliczkana

Binomial name
- Colias stoliczkana Moore, 1882

= Colias stoliczkana =

Orange clouded yellow

Species of butterfly

Colias stoliczkana, the orange clouded yellow, is a small butterfly of the family Pieridae, that is, the yellows and whites, that is found in India.

== See also ==
- Pieridae
- List of butterflies of India
- List of butterflies of India (Pieridae)
