= Ferdinand Stoliczka =

Moravian palaeontologist

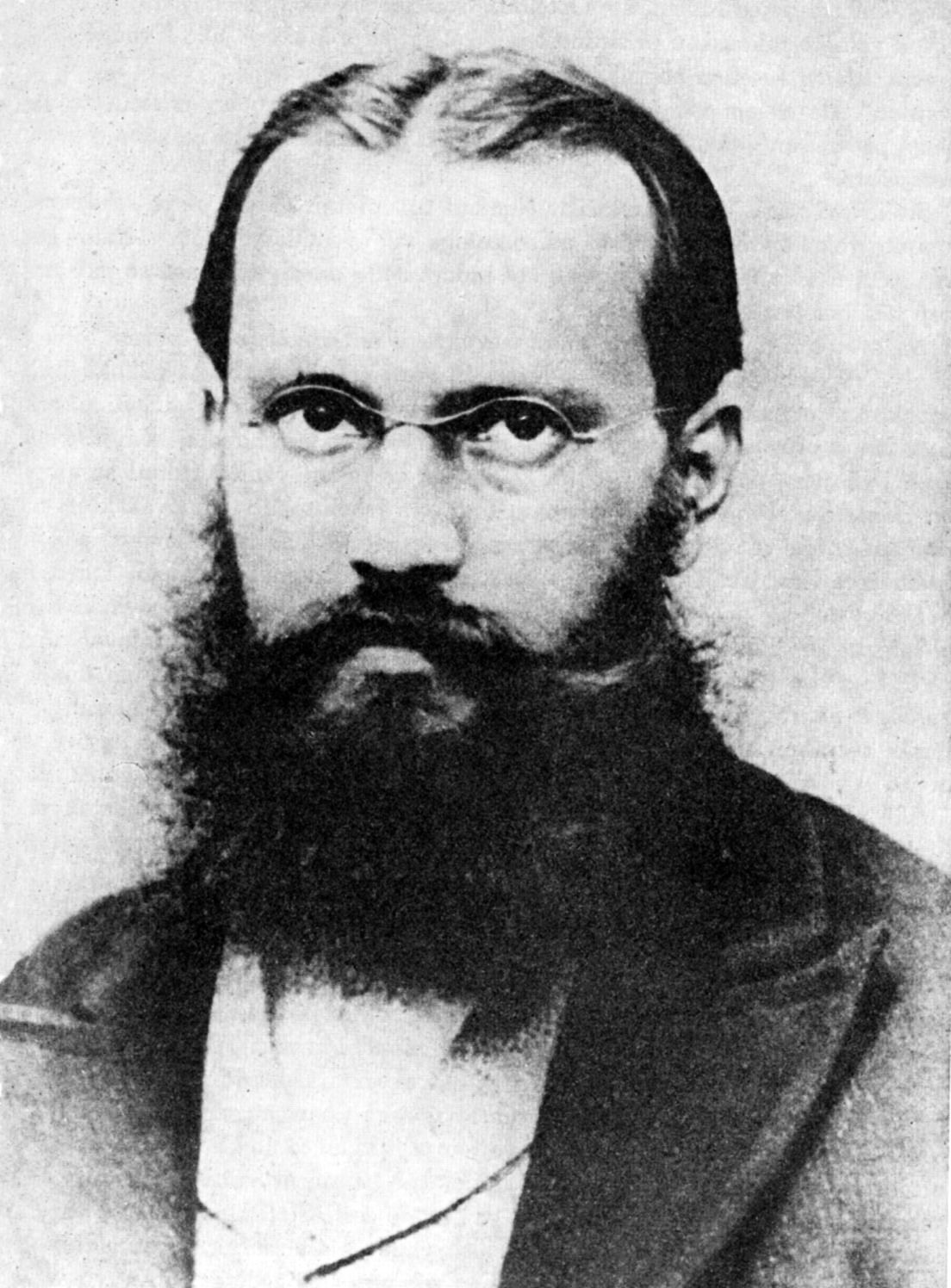
- Born: 7 June 1838
- Died: 19 June 1874 (aged 36)
- Education: Charles University

Ferdinand Stoliczka (Czech written Stolička, 7 June 1838 – 19 June 1874) was a Moravian palaeontologist who worked in India on paleontology, geology and various aspects of zoology, including ornithology, malacology, and herpetology. He died of high altitude sickness in Murgo during an expedition across the Himalayas.

== Early life ==
Stoliczka was born at the lodge Zámeček near Kroměříž in Moravia. Stoliczka, whose father was a forester who took care of the estate of the Archbishop of Olomouc, studied at a German Secondary school in Kroměříž. Although Stoliczka published 79 articles from 1859 to 1875, he never wrote anything in Czech. It is believed that he spoke German at home. In his Calcutta years he was an important figure in the German-speaking community there.

Stoliczka studied geology and palaeontology at Prague and the University of Vienna under Professor Eduard Suess and Dr Rudolf Hoernes. He graduated with a Ph D from the University of Tübingen on 14 November 1861. His early works were studies on some freshwater mollusca from the Cretaceous rocks of the north-eastern Alps about which he wrote to the Vienna Academy in 1859. His scientific career proper started in the Austrian Geological Survey, which he joined in 1861, and his first papers there were based on work in the Alps and Hungary.

== Career in India ==
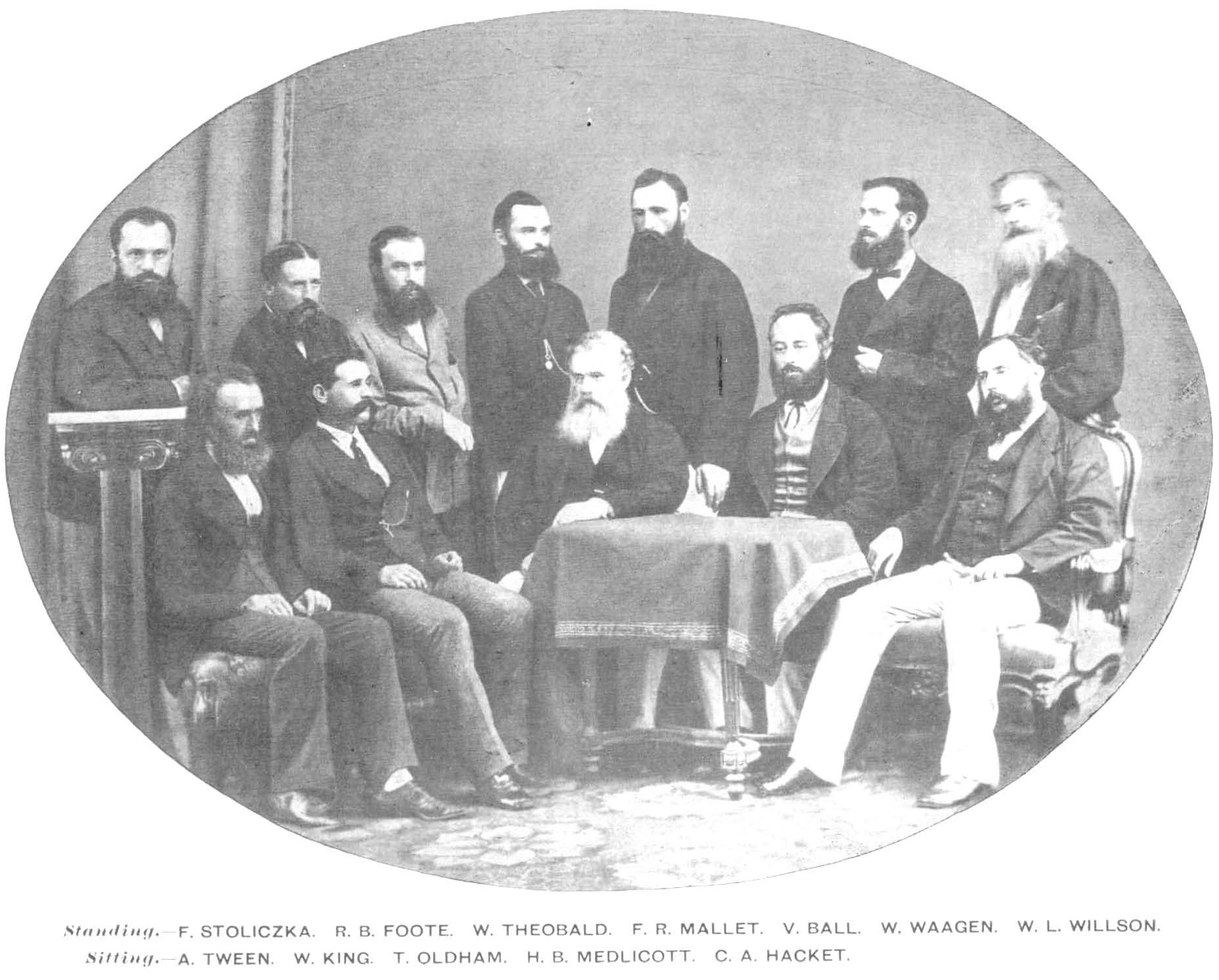
The Geological Survey of India in 1870. Standing: F Stoliczka, R B Foote, W Theobald, FR Mallet, V Ball, W. Waagen, WL Willson Sitting: A Tween, W King, T Oldham, HB Medlicott, CA Hackett

In 1862 Stoliczka joined the Geological Survey of India (GSI) under the British Government in India after being recruited by Dr Thomas Oldham (1816–1878). In Calcutta he was assigned the job of documenting the Cretaceous fossils of southern India and published them in the Palaeontologia indica, along with William Thomas Blanford. By May 1873 this work was completed with four volumes totalling nearly 1500 quarto size pages with 178 plates. Among these works was the osteological description of Oxyglossus pusillus, a fossil frog from the Deccan Traps of Bombay.

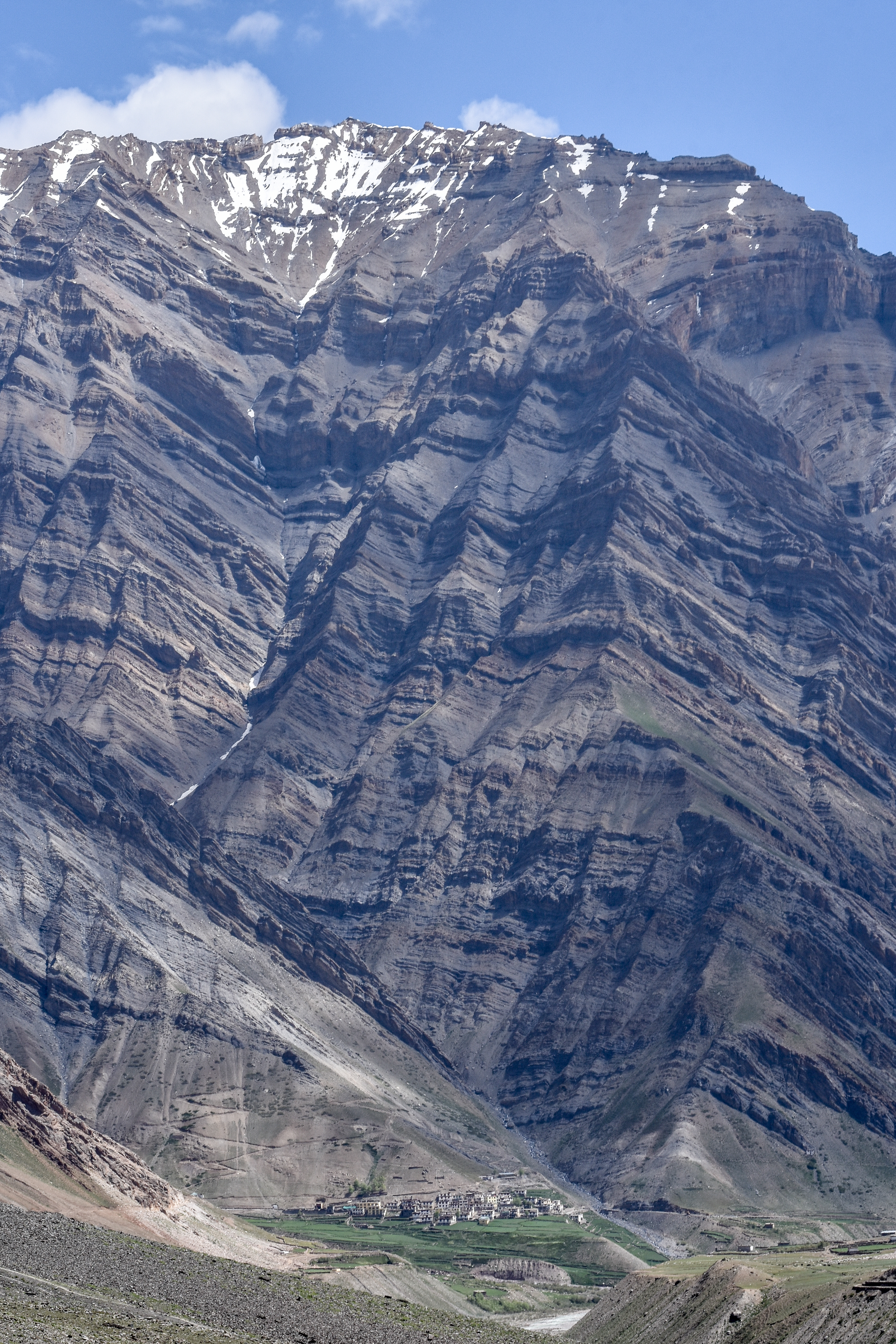
Stoliczka discovered the Mudh formation when he visited Mud village, Spiti in the 1860s

He studied the geology of the western Himalayas and Tibet, and published numerous papers on many subjects including Indian zoology. He was also briefly (in 1868) the joint curator of the Indian Museum and also the Natural History Secretary of the Asiatic Society of Bengal. He was involved in editing the Society's journal.

== Expeditions ==
He visited Burma, Malaya and Singapore, and made two trips to the Andaman and Nicobar Islands and the Rann of Kutch. His first Himalayan trip was in 1864 with F. R. Mallet of the GSI. In 1865 he visited again with an artist friend and a dog to the Ladakh Valley. He visited Kutch in 1871–1872 but noted that his geology work kept him from making many observations. He noted wild cheetahs from the region and also what is now Stoliczka's bushchat. In 1873 he joined an expedition organized by Hume along with Valentine Ball to the Andaman and Nicobar islands.

== Last expedition ==
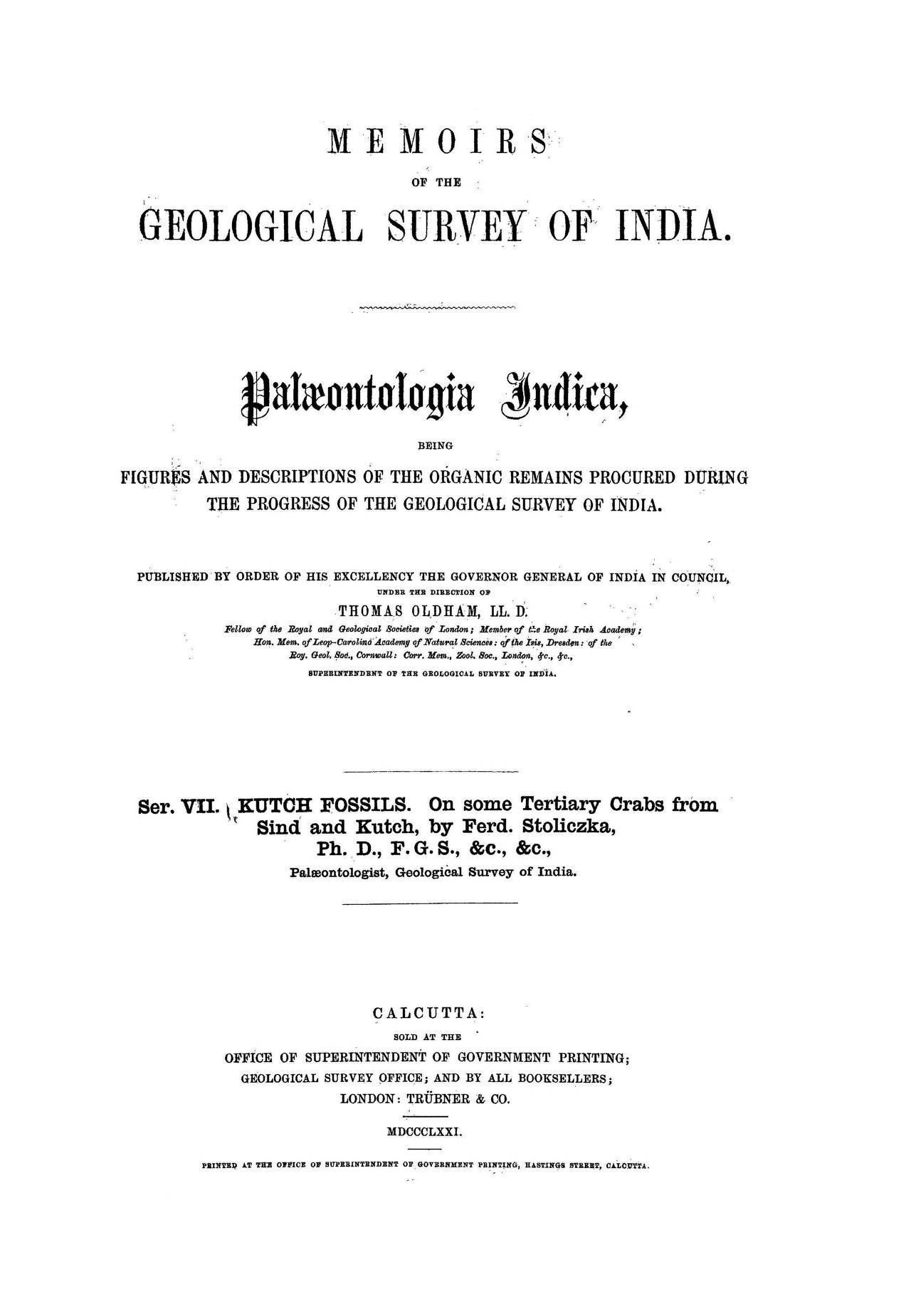
Paleontologia Indica (1871)

His third and last expedition was the most important expedition (1873–1874) during the height of the "Great Game", the rivalry between the Russian and British empires. Eastern Turkestan (Kashgaria) was a buffer state of prime importance. The British launched an official diplomatic enterprise—the Second Yarkand Mission led by Thomas Douglas Forsyth and to Yakub Beg, the ruler of Chinese Turkestan. The mission included 350 support staff and 550 animals. The expedition also needed 6476 porters and 1621 horses and it is said that the Ladakh economy took four years to recover from the losses incurred. The seven sahibs on the mission, in addition to Forsyth and Stoliczka, were Thomas E. Gordon, John Biddulph, Henry Bellew, Henry Trotter, and R. A. Champman.

The mission set out from Rawalpindi to Leh via Murree. The mission travelled past the Pangong Lake, Changchenmo and Karakash Valley onto Shahidulla and finally to Yarkand. They reached Kashgar in December 1873. On 17 March 1874 they began the return journey. They were to visit the Pamir and Afghanistan areas but could not do so due to the political situation and returned to India via Ladakh. On 16 June 1874 he had severe headaches as they crossed the Karakoram pass (5580 m). That night, he wrote....

...upon this followed massive dolomitic limestone and this was overlain with blue shales. I must have a ramble in these limestones tomorrow.

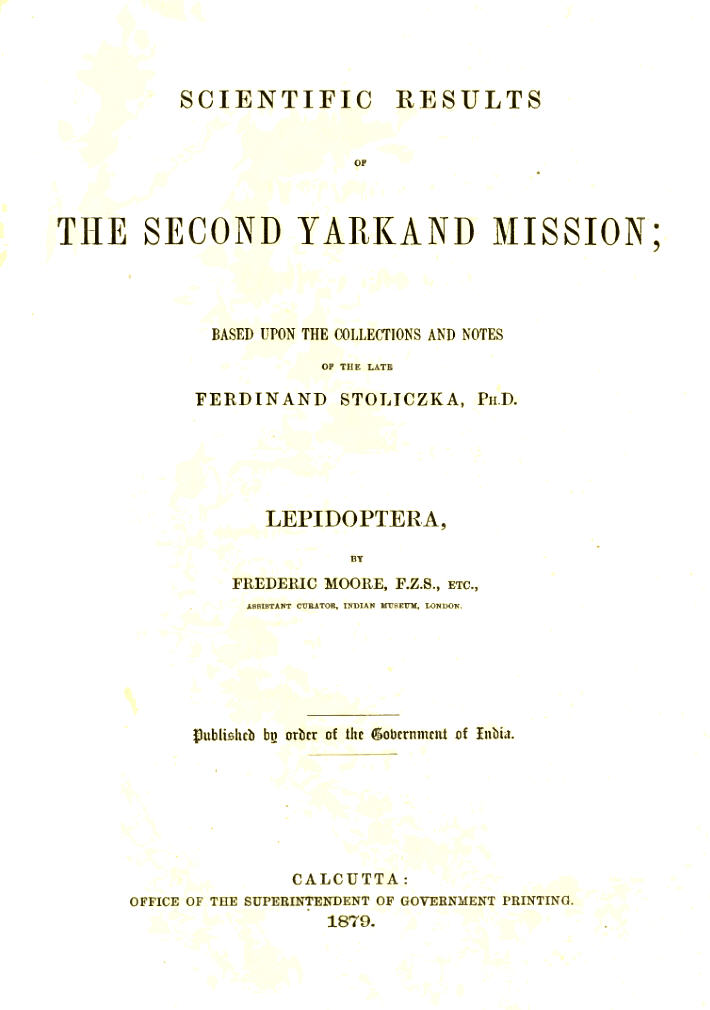
Report by Frederic Moore on the Lepidoptera collected on the mission

Captain Trotter reported that on the 18th "he started on horseback early in the morning to examine some rocks up the stream." He returned tired and complained of a headache. He breathed heavily and coughed all night. The native doctor diagnosed acute bronchitis and inflammation of the lungs and treated him with brandy mixed in a cough mixture. At 2 PM he drank some port wine and "his respiration grew slower and slower, and also did his pulse, and he finally breathed his last, dying so quietly that it was impossible to say at what precise instant he passed away".

Stoliczka died on 19 June 1874 at Murgo in Ladakh. His dying request was that the birds part of the scientific results of the expedition be published by Allan Octavian Hume. This work was finally, however, completed by Richard Bowdler-Sharpe seventeen years later.

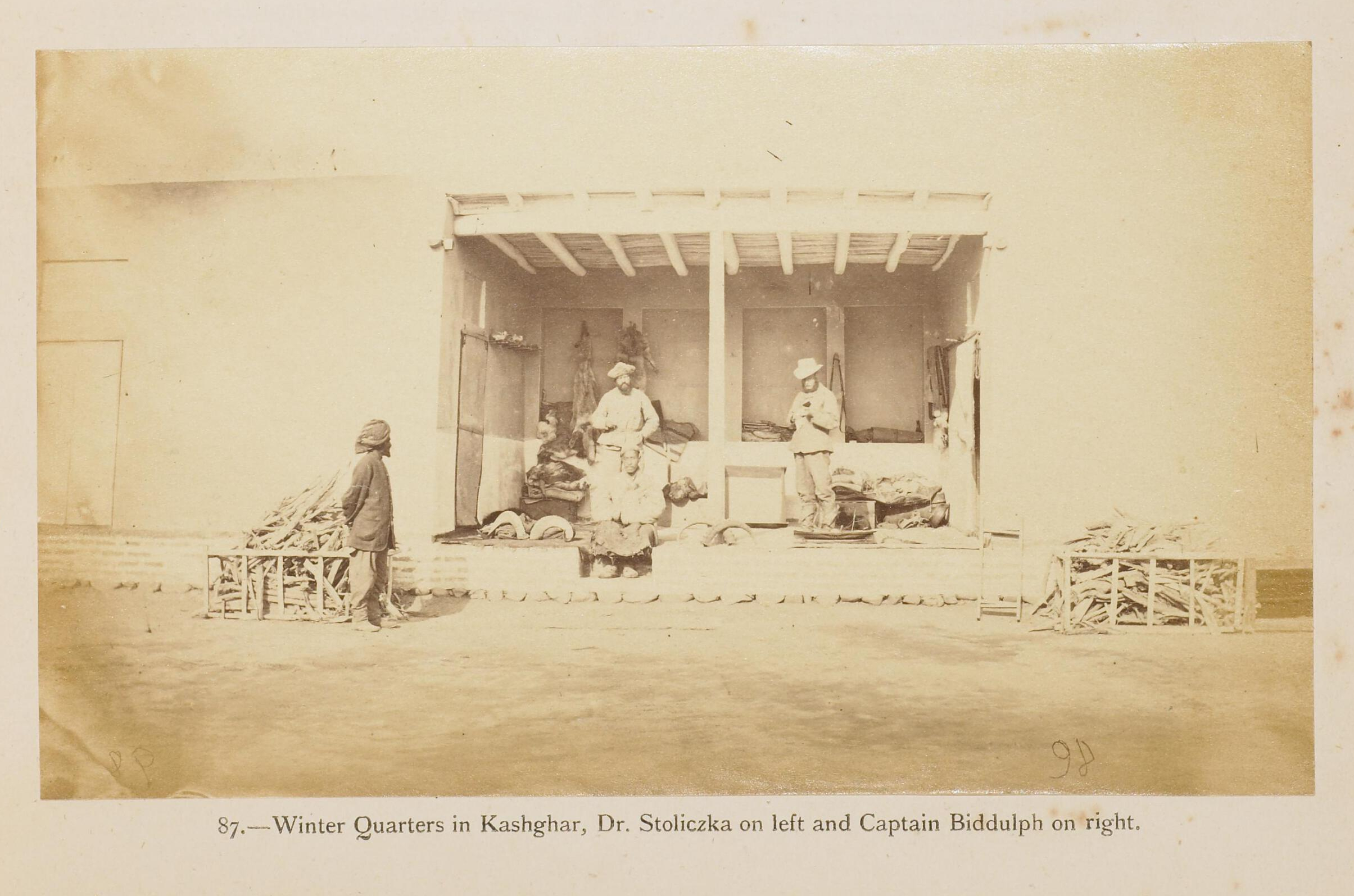
Dr Stoliczka (left) and Captain Biddulph (right) in Kashgar

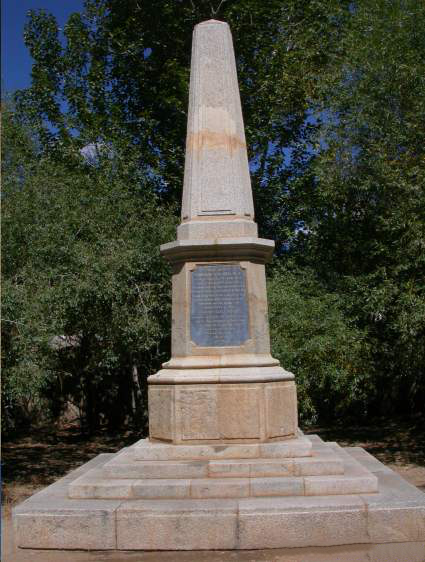
Memorial at the Moravian cemetery at Leh

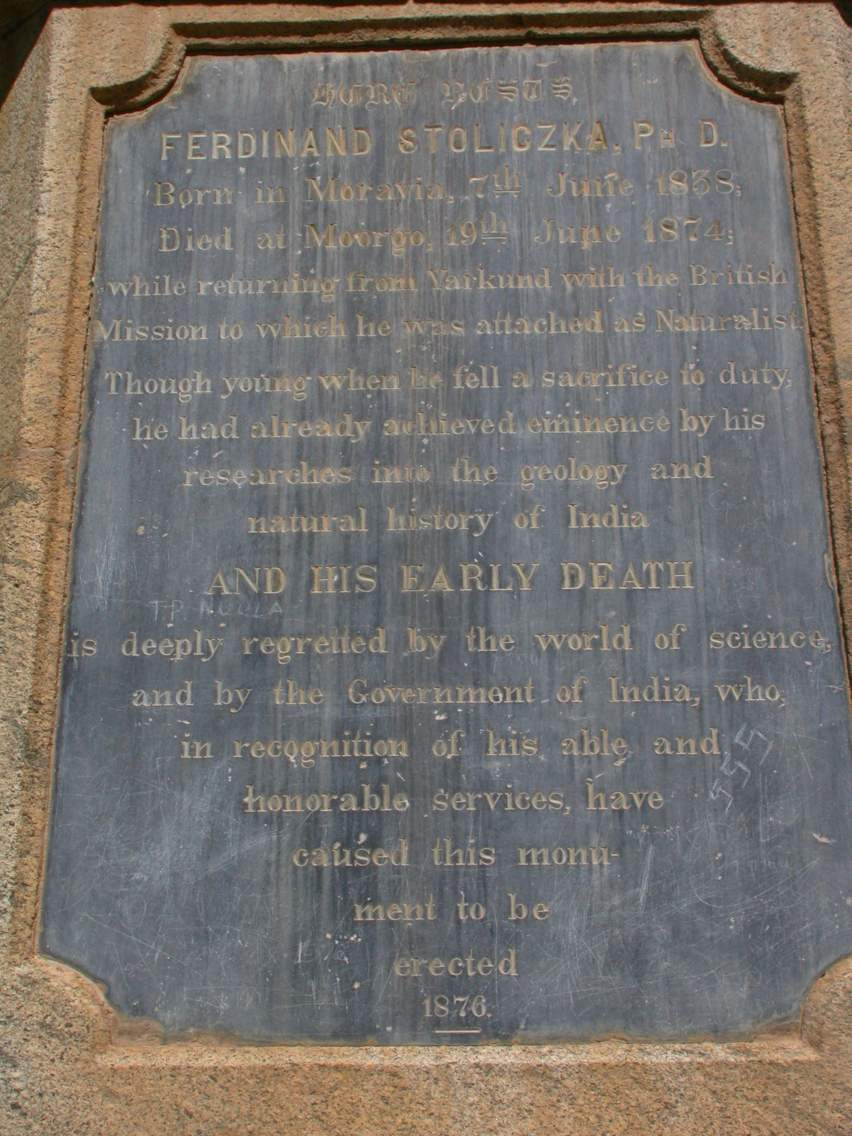
Inscription on the memorial at Leh

Dr. H. W. Bellew did the post-mortem and confirmed "spinal meningitis deteriorated by over-exertion in strenuous endeavours after information, and the great height." Today this is generally believed to have been Acute Mountain Sickness (AMS), a condition well known to Himalayan travellers. It manifests as pulmonary or cerebral oedema. Above 5,000 m (16,000 ft) this is fatal in about 40% of the cases. Conditions that aggravate it include exertion, fast ascent and alcohol, all of which were present in his case.

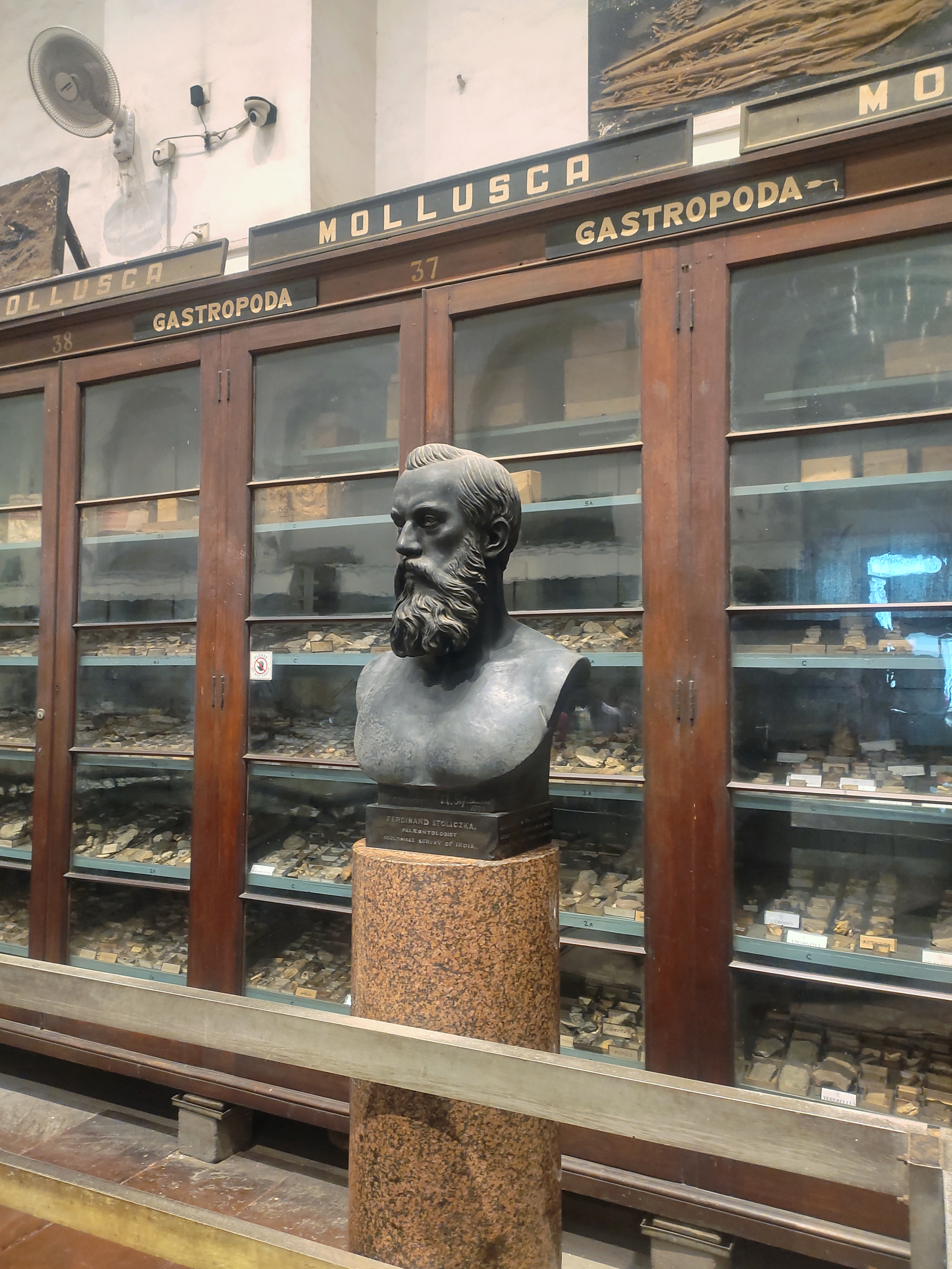
Bust at the Indian Museum, dedicated by Geological Survey of India

In his report on the expedition, Thomas E. Gordon touched on the death of his "highly valued friend and talented companion."

A granite obelisk is erected in his memory at the Moravian mission cemetery in Leh. An obituary was published in Nature on 9 July 1874 by W. T. Blanford.

FERDINAND STOLICZKA, Ph D.

Born in Moravia 7th June 1838
Died at Moorgo 19th June 1874
while returning from Yarkund with the British
Mission to which he was attached as Naturalist.
Though young when he fell a sacrifice to duty,
he had already achieved eminence by his
researches into the geology and
natural history of India
AND HIS EARLY DEATH
is deeply regretted by the world of science
and by the Government of India, who
in recognition of his able and
honourable services, have
caused this monu-
ment to be
erected

1876

== Ornithological contributions ==
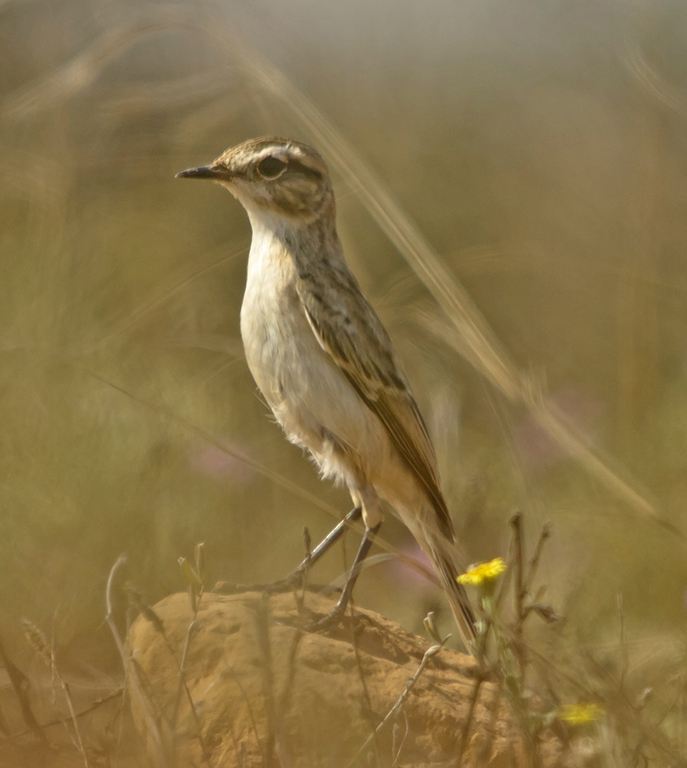
Stolickza's Bushchat at Kutch, where it winters

Stoliczka's interest in birds started only in 1864 when in the Himalayas and he was greatly encouraged by Allan Octavian Hume, the "father of Indian Ornithology". His first ornithological work was making large collections of birds from the Sutlej Valley.

Arthur Viscount Walden recognized his contributions and welcomed the geologist Stoliczka to a high place among scientific ornithologists but disagreed with Stoliczka's idea of adding new species due to small differences in plumage. Hume however supported Stoliczka and wrote a note in the journal, Ibis, against the cabinet naturalists of London who knew nothing about the geography of India. Hume shortly afterwards started the journal Stray Feathers and persuaded ornithologists in India to publish there.

Some of Stoliczka's new species were later found to have been already described by the Russian zoologist N. A. Severtzov. A week before his death, Stoliczka wrote to Valentine Ball...

'Please tell Waterhouse to order for the Asiatic, Severtzov's Turkestanskie Jevotnie immediately, if it is not at the Indian Museum. If they do not like ordering it, order it for myself through Truebner without delay. Do not forget, please.'

A partial list of his publications on birds includes:

- Stoliczka, F. (1873): Letters to the Editor. Stray Feathers. 1(5):425-427.
- Stoliczka, F. (1874): Letters to the Editor. Stray Feathers. 2(4&5):461-463.
- Stoliczka, F. (1874): Letters to the Editor. Stray Feathers. 2(4&5):463-465.
- Stoliczka, F. (1875): The avifauna of Kashgar in winter. Stray Feathers. 3(1,2&3):215-220.
- Stoliczka, F. (1872): Notice of the mammals and birds inhabiting Kachh [Cutch]. Jour. Asiatic Soc. Bengal 41(2):211-258.
- Stoliczka, F. (1868): Ornithological observations in the Sutlej valley, N.W. Himalayas. Jour. Asiatic Soc. Bengal 37(2):1-70.

== Herpetological contributions ==
In the scientific field of herpetology Stoliczka described many new species of amphibians and reptiles, and several species and a genus have been named in his honor by other herpetologists.

=== Taxon described by him ===
- See Category:Taxa named by Ferdinand Stoliczka

== Eponymous species and subspecies ==
Some of the species and subspecies named after Stoliczka are listed below. Not all names may be currently valid.

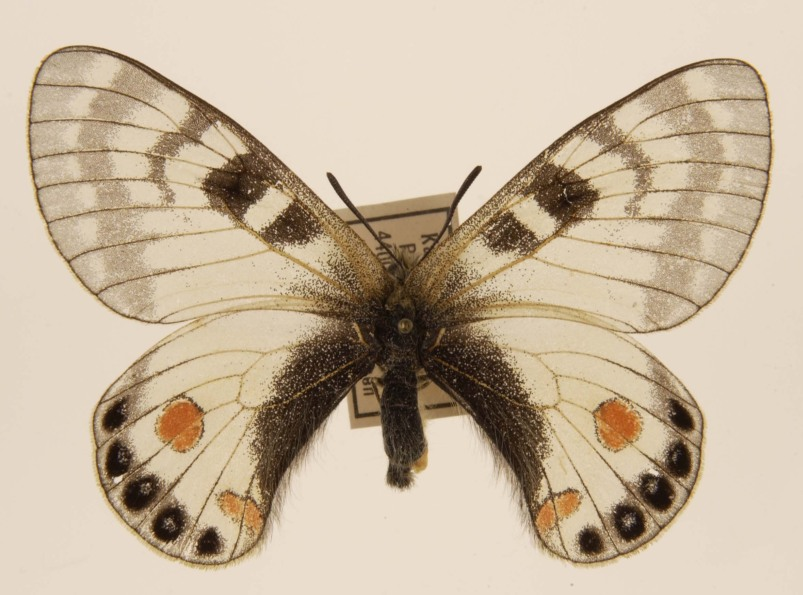
Parnassius stoliczkanus

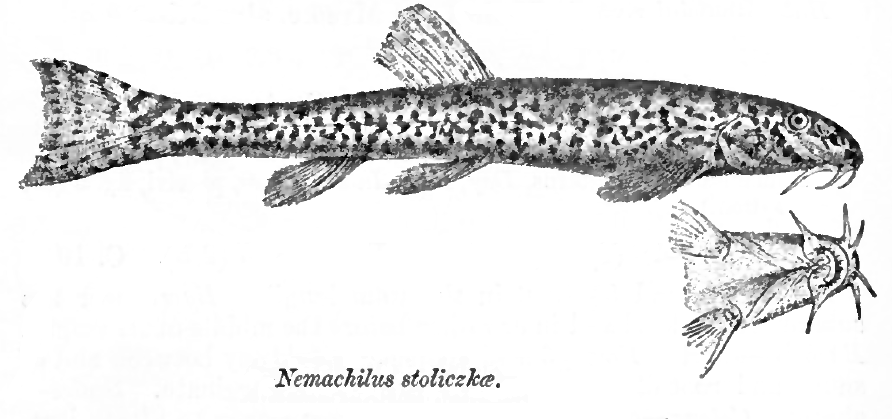
Triplophysa stoliczkai

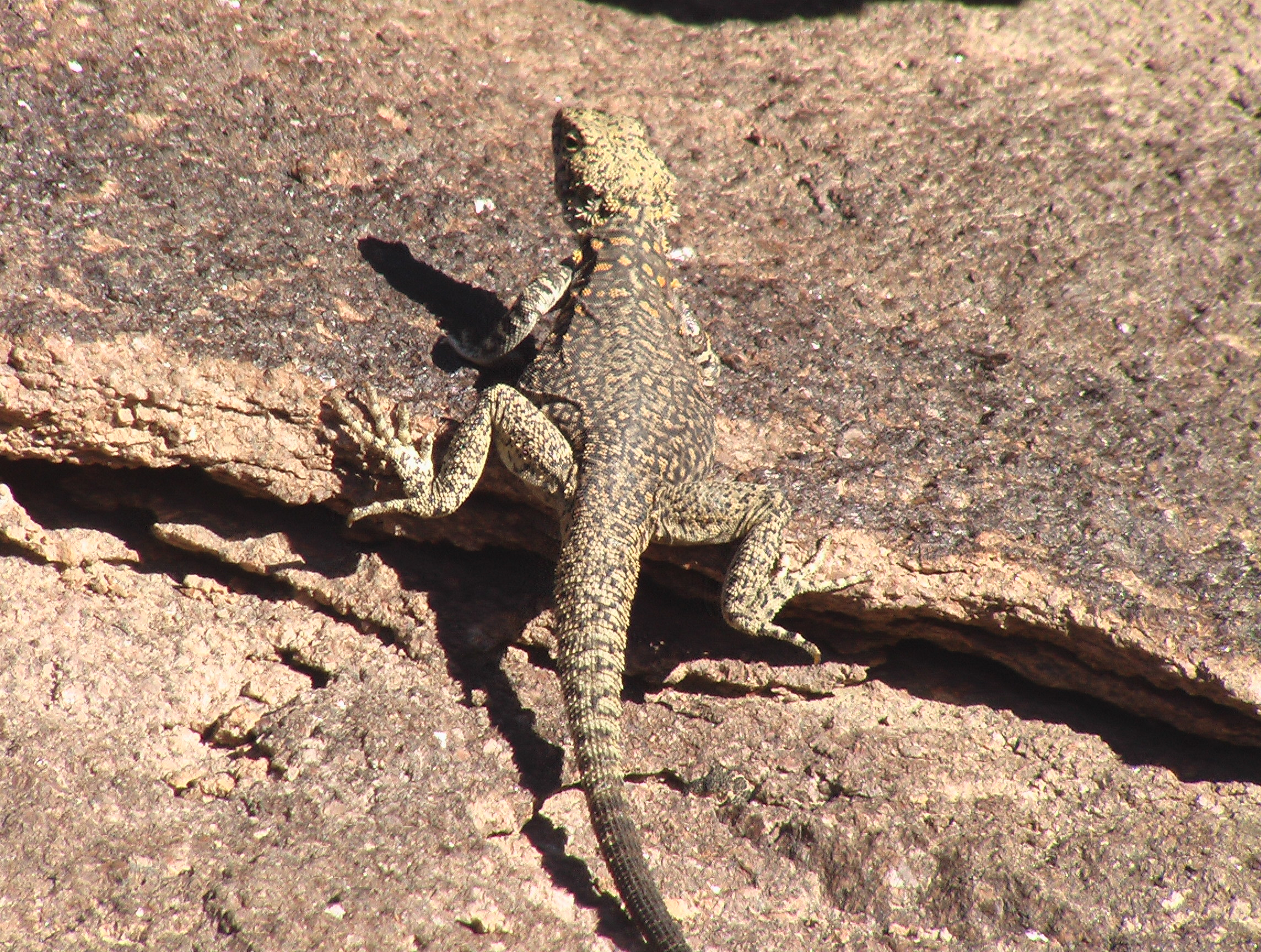
Paralaudakia stoliczkana

=== Taxa named in his honor ===
- The ammonite genus Stoliczkaia

Arachnids

- Stoliczka's crab spider, Thomisus stoliczka
- The nursery web spider genus Stoliczka

Birds

- Stoliczka's treecreeper, Certhia nipalensis
- Stoliczka's bushchat, Saxicola macrorhyncha Stoliczka, 1872

Fish

- Stoliczka's loach, Triplophysa stoliczkai (Steindachner, 1866)
- Stoliczka's barb, Pethia stoliczkana

Insects

- Ladakh banded apollo, Parnassius stoliczkanus C. & R. Felder 1864
- Orange clouded yellow, Colias stoliczkana Moore, 1882

Mammals

- Stoliczka's trident bat, Aselliscus stoliczkanus
- Stoliczka's mountain vole, Alticola stoliczkanus

Reptiles

- Mongolia rock agama, Paralaudakia stoliczkana (Blanford, 1875)
- The snake genus Stoliczkia
- Stoliczka's tawny cat snake, Boiga ochracea stoliczkae
- Stoliczka's stripe-necked snake, Liopeltis stoliczkae
- Frontier bow-fingered gecko, Altiphylax stoliczkai
- Paraxenodermus borneensis (Boulenger, 1899) with the common names: Borneo red snake, Stolickza's stream snake; is a species of snake in the family Xenodermatidae.

== See also ==
- Stoliczka Island (Остров Столичка)

== Other sources ==
- Kolmas, Josef (1982). Ferdinand Stoliczka (1838–1874) the life and work of the Czech explorer in India and high Asia (PDF). Vienna: Arbeitskreis für Tibetische und Buddhistische Studien Universitat.
- Scientific results of the second Yarkand mission : based upon the collections and notes of the late Ferdinand Stoliczka. London: Eyre & Spottiswoode. 1891 – via Biodiversity Heritage Library.
