= Lipinia quadrivittata =

Conservation status
- Least Concern (IUCN 3.1)

Scientific classification
- Kingdom: Animalia
- Phylum: Chordata
- Class: Reptilia
- Order: Squamata
- Suborder: Scinciformata
- Infraorder: Scincomorpha
- Family: Sphenomorphidae
- Genus: Lipinia
- Species: L. quadrivittata

Binomial name
- Lipinia quadrivittata (Peters, 1867)

Species of lizard

Lipinia quadrivittata, the four-striped lipinia or black-striped slender tree skink, is a species of skink.

== Distribution ==
Indonesia (Borneo, Celebes), Sunda Region (Borneo), Philippines (Palawan), Sula Islands, south Thailand (Bukit Besar, Patani states), and India
