= Lipinia microcerca =

Scientific classification
- Kingdom: Animalia
- Phylum: Chordata
- Class: Reptilia
- Order: Squamata
- Family: Scincidae
- Genus: Lipinia
- Species: L. microcerca

Binomial name
- Lipinia microcerca (Boettger, 1901)

Species of lizard

Lipinia microcerca, also known as the banded lipinia, Sipora striped skink, or common striped skink, is a species of skink. It is found in southern Vietnam, Cambodia, and southern Laos; its range might extend into Thailand and eastern Myanmar. Until a recent (2019) revision, it was considered a subspecies of Lipinia vittigera.
