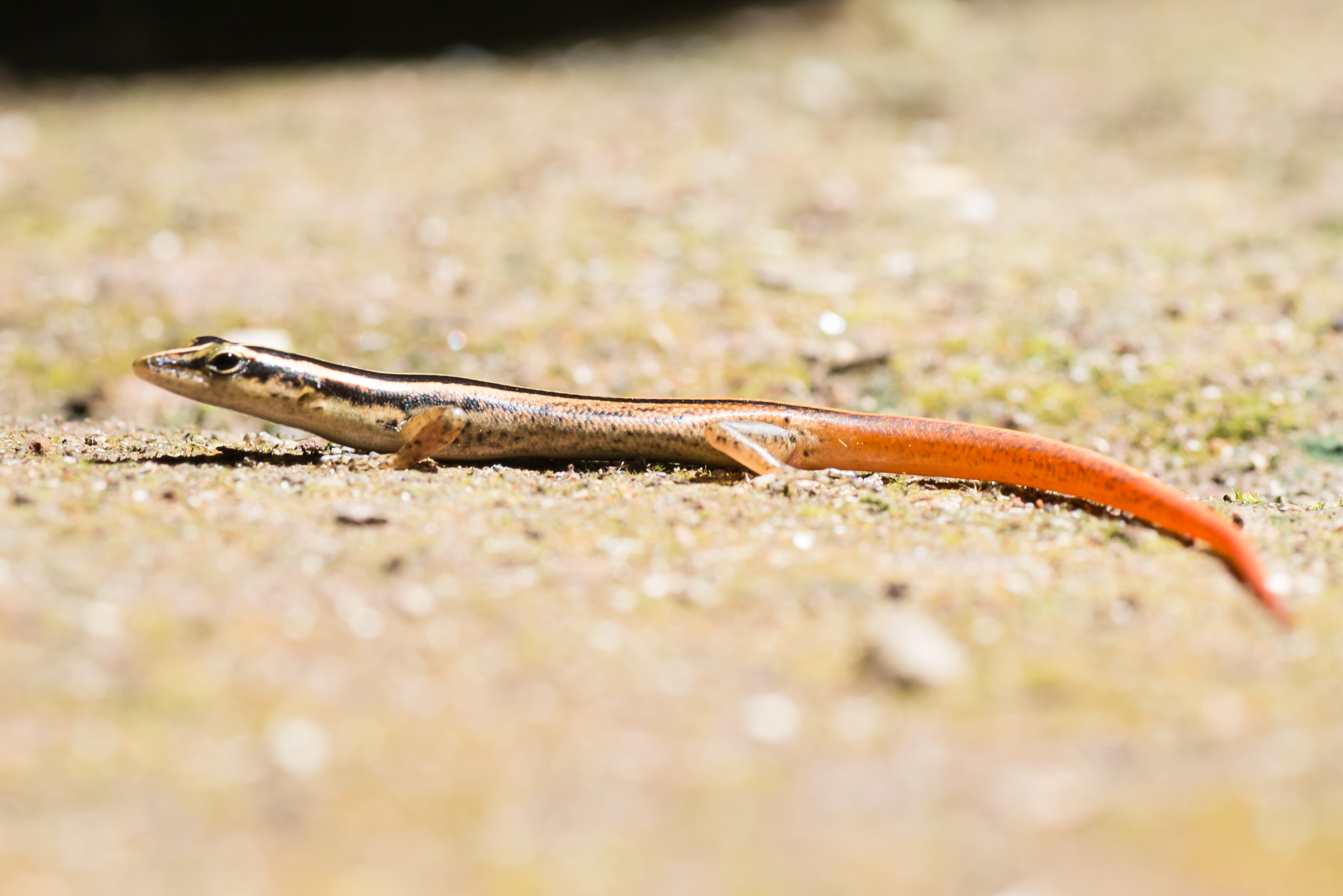

Conservation status
- Least Concern (IUCN 3.1)

Scientific classification
- Kingdom: Animalia
- Phylum: Chordata
- Class: Reptilia
- Order: Squamata
- Family: Scincidae
- Genus: Lipinia
- Species: L. vittigera

Binomial name
- Lipinia vittigera (Boulenger, 1894)

Synonyms
- Lygosoma vittigerum Boulenger, 1894; Lygosoma pulchellum ANNANDALE 1905; Leiolopisma pranensis COCHRAN 1930; Lygosoma vittigerum SWORDER 1933; Leiolopisma vittigerum vittigerum SMITH 1935; Leiolopisma vittigerum vittigerum TAYLOR 1963; Lipinia vittigera GREER 1974: 11; Lipinia vittigera MANTHEY & GROSSMANN 1997; Lipinia cf. vittigera TEO & RAJATHURAI 1997; Lipinia vittigera COX et al. 1998: 116; Lipinia vittigera DAS & AUSTIN 2007; Lipinia vittigerum microcercum'' BOETTGER 1901; Lygosoma (Leiolopisma) microcercum BOETTGER 1901; Lygosoma vittigerum kronfanum SMITH 1922; Leiolopisma vittigerum microcercum TAYLOR 1963; Lygosoma (Scincella) vittigerum vittigerum GRANDISON 1972; Lipinia vittigerum microcercum BOBROV 1995; Lipinia vittigera microcerca BOBROV & SEMENOV 2008; Lipinia vittigera microcercum GROSSMANN 2010

= Lipinia vittigera =

Species of lizard

Lipinia vittigera, the banded lipinia, Sipora striped skink or common striped skink, is a species of skink in the genus of Lipinia native to Myanmar, Thailand, Vietnam, Malaysia, Singapore and Cambodia.
