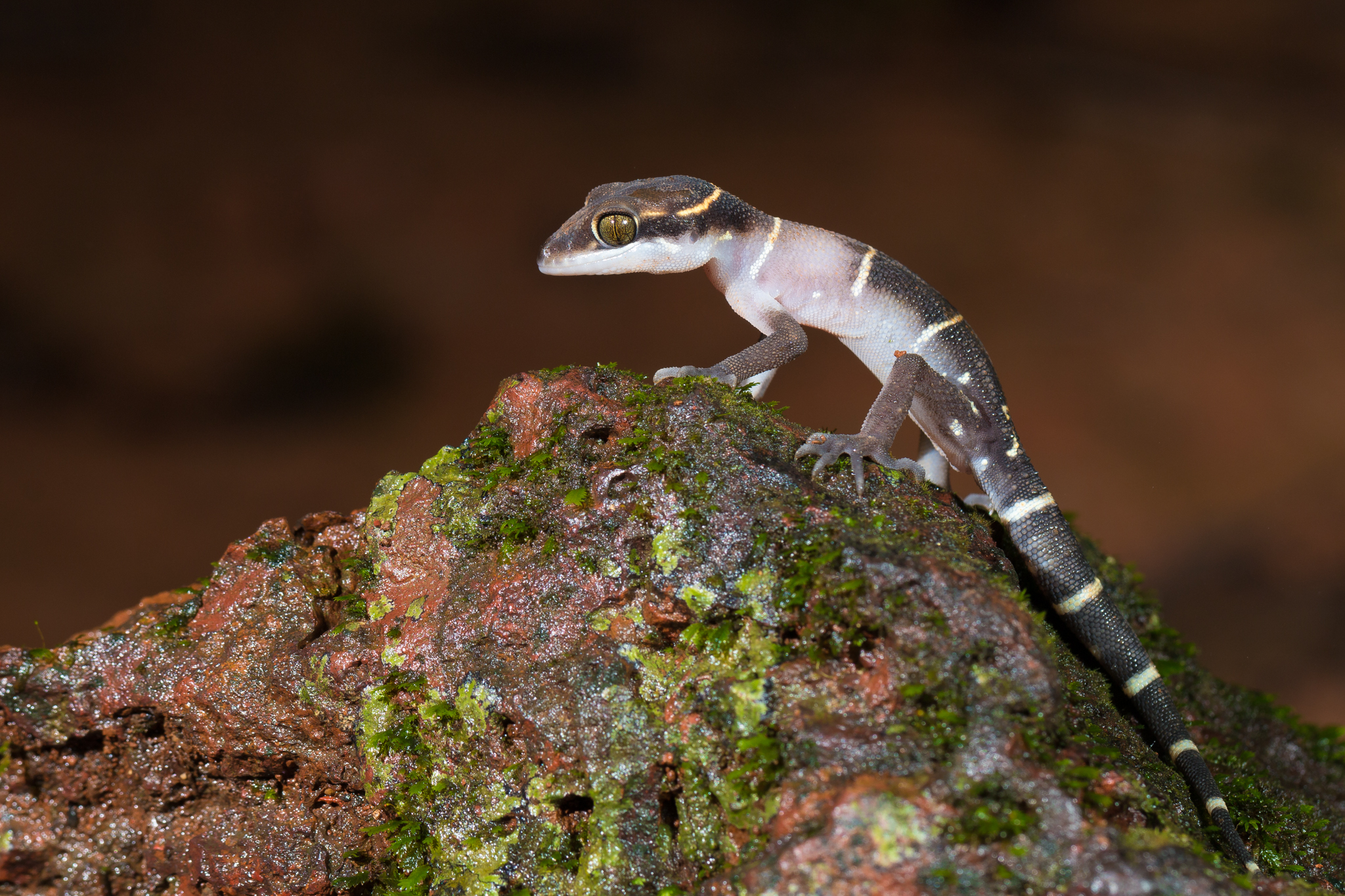
- Individual at Dandeli (Geckoella sp)

Scientific classification
- Domain: Eukaryota
- Kingdom: Animalia
- Phylum: Chordata
- Class: Reptilia
- Order: Squamata
- Infraorder: Gekkota
- Family: Gekkonidae
- Subfamily: Gekkoninae
- Genus: Geckoella; Gray, 1867

Type species
- Geckoella punctata Gray, 1867

Species
- see text

= Geckoella =

Genus of lizards

Geckoella is a disputed genus of Gekkonidae endemic to India and Sri Lanka.

== Classification of genus Geckoella ==
The phylogenetic relationships within the genus Geckoella has not been resolved to date. Based on morphology, Bauer (2002) suggested that it was a subgenus of Cyrtodactylus but a phylogenetic study by Feng et al. (2007), though with inadequate sampling of taxa, restored it to generic status once again. They have all been placed under the genus Cyrtodactylus until a more definitive classification can be worked out.

Seven species have been recorded.

The five species found in India, listed alphabetically, are :

- Geckoella albofasciatus (Boulenger, 1885)– Boulenger's Indian gecko
- Geckoella collegalensis (Beddome, 1870) – Kollegal ground gecko
- Geckoella deccanensis (Günther, 1864)
- Geckoella irulaorum (Agarwal, 2023)
- Geckoella jeyporensis (Beddome, 1877) – Patinghe Indian gecko
- Geckoella nebulosus (Beddome, 1870)

Two species found in Sri Lanka, listed alphabetically, are :

- Geckoella triedrus (Günther, 1864) - Sri Lanka Gecko
- Geckoella yakhuna (Deraniyagala, 1945) - Northern Sri Lanka Gecko,

occur in the arid and moist zones of Sri Lanka respectively.

== Works cited ==
- Bauer, Aaron M. (2002). "Two New Species of Cyrtodactylus (Squamata: Gekkonidae) from Myanmar". Proceedings of the California Academy of Sciences. 53 (7): 73–86.
- Feng, Jinye; Han, Demin; Bauer, Aaron M.; Zhou, Kaiya (2007). "Interrelationships Among Gekkonid Geckos Inferred from Mitochondrial and Nuclear Gene Sequences". Zoological Science. 24 (7): 656–665. doi:10.2108/zsj.24.656. PMID 17824773. S2CID 46274800.
