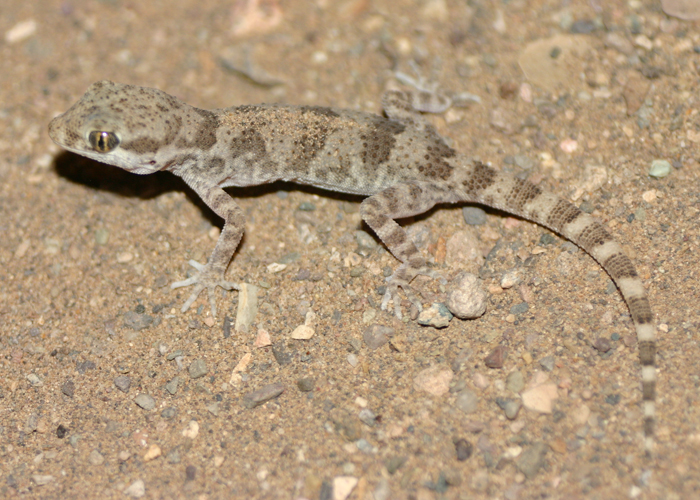
- Bunopus crassicauda, in Iran

Scientific classification
- Kingdom: Animalia
- Phylum: Chordata
- Class: Reptilia
- Order: Squamata
- Suborder: Gekkota
- Family: Gekkonidae
- Subfamily: Gekkoninae
- Genus: Bunopus; Blanford, 1874

Species
- See text.
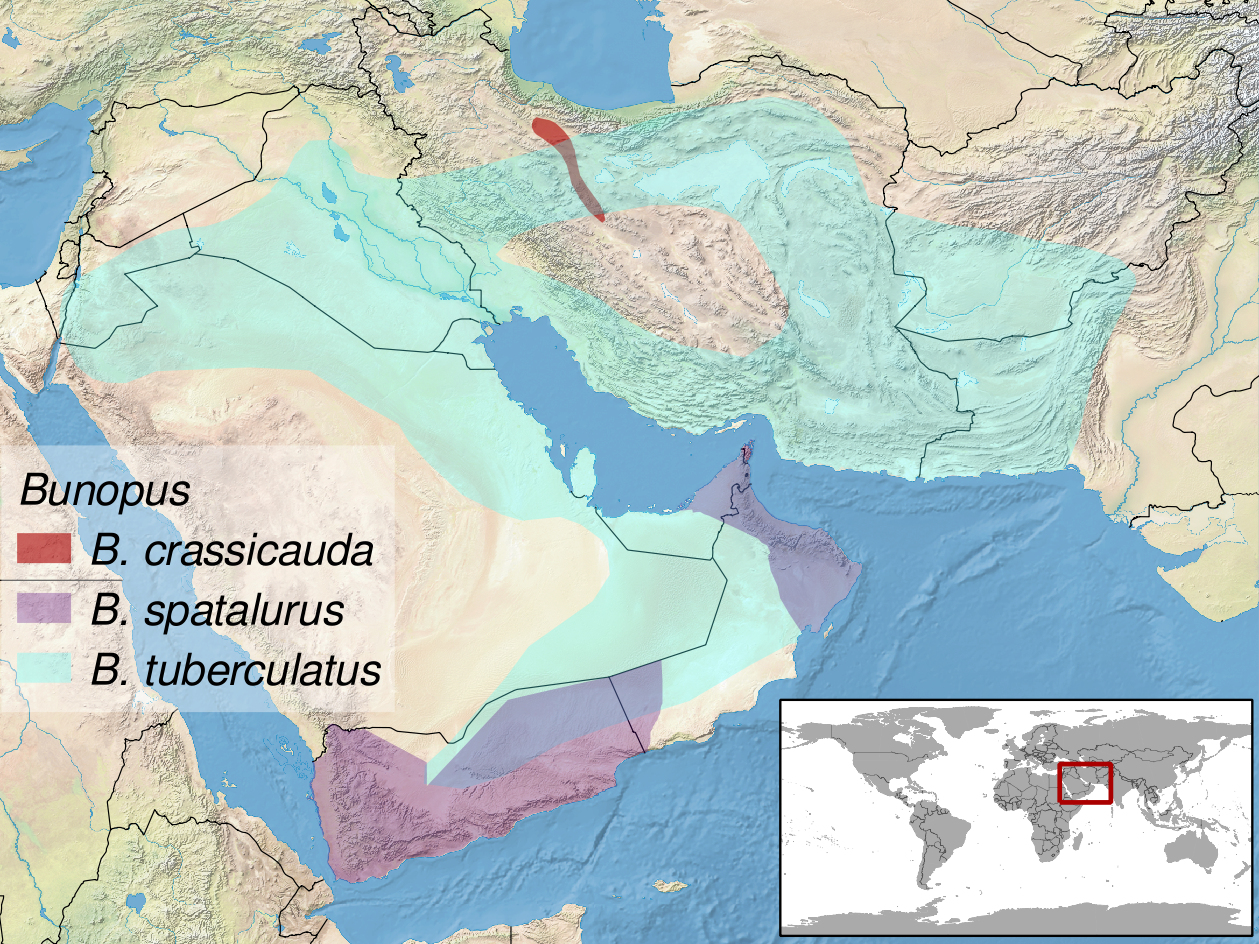

= Bunopus =

Genus of lizards

Bunopus is a genus of small geckos, lizards in the family Gekkonidae. The genus is endemic to the Middle East.

== Species ==
Three species are recognized as being valid.

- Bunopus blanfordii Strauch, 1887 – Blanford's ground gecko
- Bunopus crassicauda Nikolsky, 1907 – thickhead rock gecko
- Bunopus tuberculatus Blanford, 1874 – Baluch rock gecko

The species formerly known as Bunopus spatalurus, the spacious rock gecko, has been assigned to the genus Trachydactylus as Trachydactylus spatalurus.
