= Epischidia fulvostrigella =

Scientific classification
- Domain: Eukaryota
- Kingdom: Animalia
- Phylum: Arthropoda
- Class: Insecta
- Order: Lepidoptera
- Family: Pyralidae
- Genus: Epischidia
- Species: E. fulvostrigella

Binomial name
- Epischidia fulvostrigella (Eversmann, 1844)

Synonyms
- Phycis fulvostrigella Eversmann, 1844; Pempelia fronticornella Herrich-Schäffer, 1860

Species of moth

Epischidia fulvostrigella is a species of snout moth in the genus Epischidia. It was described by Eduard Friedrich Eversmann in 1844. It is found in Russia, Romania and Spain.
