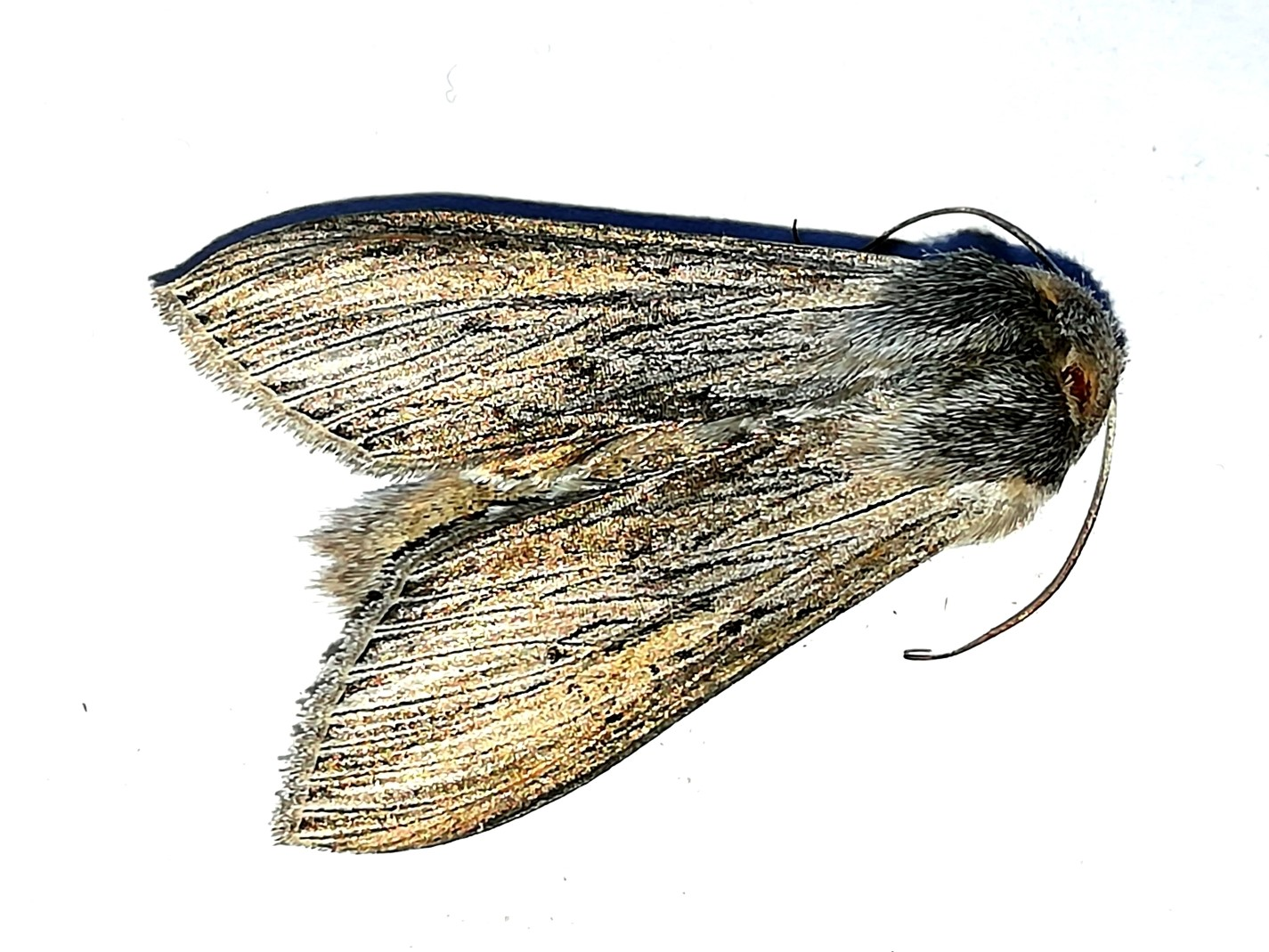

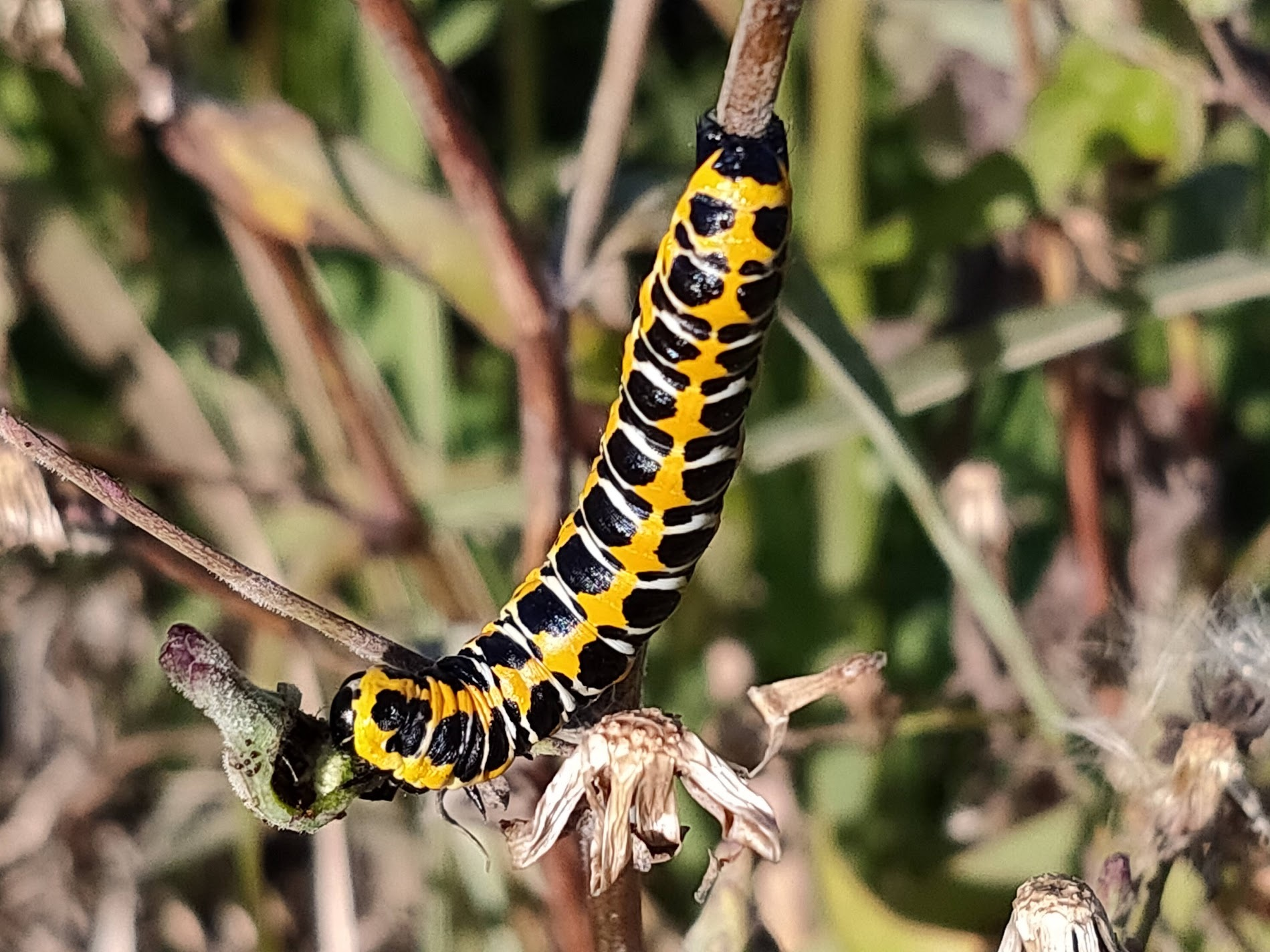
- Adult (top) and larva (bottom)

Scientific classification
- Kingdom: Animalia
- Phylum: Arthropoda
- Class: Insecta
- Order: Lepidoptera
- Superfamily: Noctuoidea
- Family: Noctuidae
- Genus: Cucullia
- Species: C. pustulata

Binomial name
- Cucullia pustulata Eversmann, 1842

= Cucullia pustulata =

Species of moth

Cucullia pustulata is a species of moth belonging to the family Noctuidae.

It is native to Eurasia.
