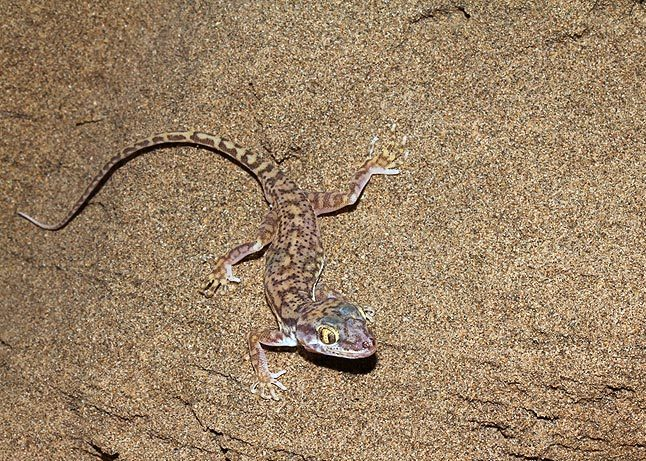

Scientific classification
- Kingdom: Animalia
- Phylum: Chordata
- Class: Reptilia
- Order: Squamata
- Suborder: Gekkota
- Family: Gekkonidae
- Subfamily: Gekkoninae
- Genus: Crossobamon; Boettger, 1888

= Crossobamon =

Genus of lizards

Crossobamon is a genus of lizards of the gecko family Gekkonidae.

== Species ==
The genus Crossobamon contains two species:

- Crossobamon eversmanni (Wiegmann, 1834)
- Crossobamon orientalis (Blanford, 1876)

The latter species is poorly described, and was formerly considered a member of the genus Stenodactylus.

== Etymology ==
The genus name: Gr. κροσσοι krossoi "tassels, fringe"; βαινω bainō "to walk". The specific name, eversmanni, is in honor of German-born Russian biologist Alexander Eduard Friedrich Eversmann.

== Geographic range ==
Geckos of the genus Crossobamon live in Pakistan, Afghanistan, Russia, and Central Asia.

== Description ==
Of average size for geckos, about 16 cm (6.3 in) long, the two species are similar in appearance.
