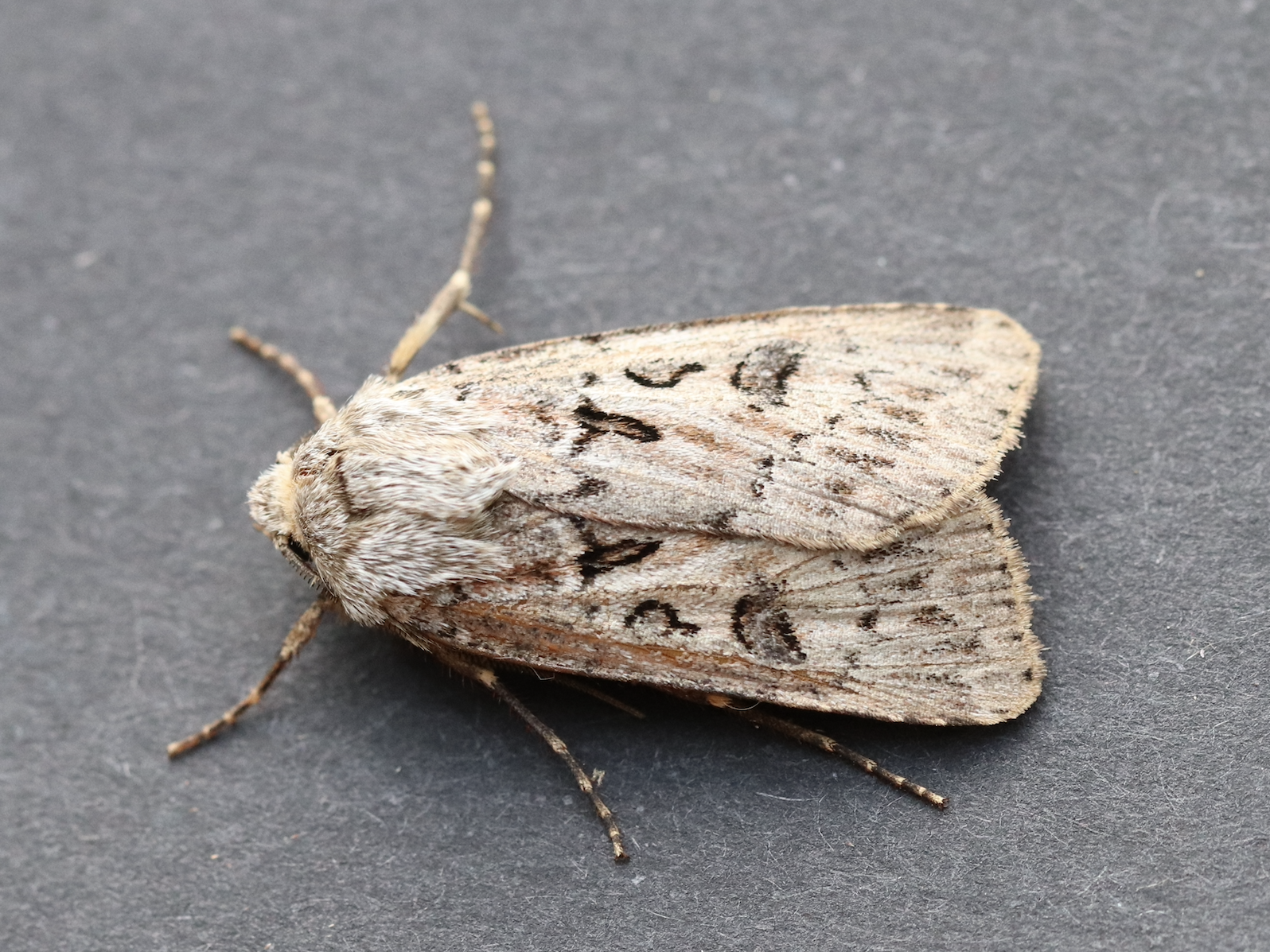

Scientific classification
- Kingdom: Animalia
- Phylum: Arthropoda
- Clade: Pancrustacea
- Class: Insecta
- Order: Lepidoptera
- Superfamily: Noctuoidea
- Family: Noctuidae
- Genus: Agrotis
- Species: A. ruta

Binomial name
- Agrotis ruta Eversmann, 1851

Synonyms
- Xylina ruta; Agrotis patula; Agrotis septentrionalis; Euxoa kurodakeana; Feltia subinformis; Euxoa patula

= Agrotis ruta =

Species of moth

Agrotis ruta is a species of moth in the family Noctuidae that was first described by Eduard Friedrich Eversmann in 1851. It has a Holarctic distribution. In North America it has a northern distribution, occurring from Alaska and the Yukon Territory to Labrador, south to northern Manitoba and British Columbia, and in the Rocky Mountains to southern Alberta. Furthermore, it can be found in the northern Urals, Siberia, Mongolia, China and Japan.

Agrotis patula was placed in synonymy with Agrotis ruta by Kononenko et al. in 1989.

The wingspan is 40–46 mm.
