= Trigonodactylus persicus =

Scientific classification
- Kingdom: Animalia
- Phylum: Chordata
- Class: Reptilia
- Order: Squamata
- Suborder: Gekkota
- Family: Gekkonidae
- Genus: Trigonodactylus
- Species: T. persicus

Binomial name
- Trigonodactylus persicus Nazarov, Melnikov, Radjabizadeh, & Poyarkov, 2018

Species of lizard

Trigonodactylus persicus is a species of gecko that is endemic to Iran. It is closely related to Trigonodactylus arabicus.
