= Megachile fulvimana =

Scientific classification
- Domain: Eukaryota
- Kingdom: Animalia
- Phylum: Arthropoda
- Class: Insecta
- Order: Hymenoptera
- Family: Megachilidae
- Genus: Megachile
- Species: M. fulvimana

Binomial name
- Megachile fulvimana Eversmann, 1852

Species of leafcutter bee (Megachile)

Megachile fulvimana is a species of bee in the family Megachilidae. It was described by Eduard Friedrich Eversmann in 1852.
