= Megachile melanogaster =

Scientific classification
- Domain: Eukaryota
- Kingdom: Animalia
- Phylum: Arthropoda
- Class: Insecta
- Order: Hymenoptera
- Family: Megachilidae
- Genus: Megachile
- Species: M. melanogaster

Binomial name
- Megachile melanogaster Eversmann, 1852

Synonyms
- Megachile sexmaculata Alfken, 1942 (Homonym); Megachile sexmaculata thracia Tkalců, 1979; Megachile pilicrus flavida Van der Zanden, 1998

Species of leafcutter bee (Megachile)

Megachile melanogaster is a species of bee in the family Megachilidae. It was described by Eduard Friedrich Eversmann in 1852.
