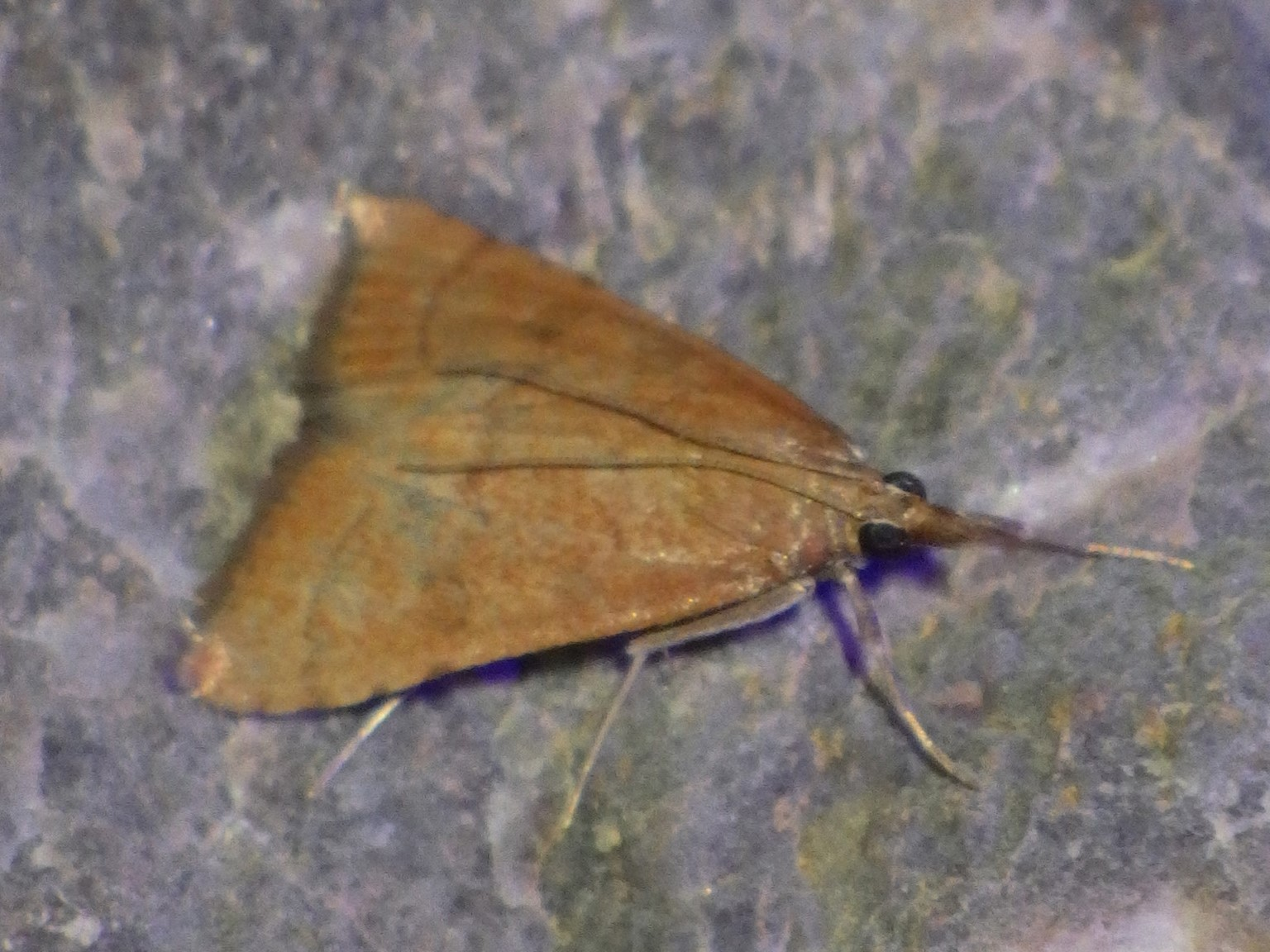

Scientific classification
- Kingdom: Animalia
- Phylum: Arthropoda
- Clade: Pancrustacea
- Class: Insecta
- Order: Lepidoptera
- Family: Crambidae
- Genus: Udea
- Species: U. ruckdescheli

Binomial name
- Udea ruckdescheli Mally, Segerer & Nuss, 2016

= Udea ruckdescheli =

Species of moth

Udea ruckdescheli is a species of moth in the family Crambidae. It was first described from specimens collected on Crete that were formerly identified as Udea fulvalis and Udea languidalis ab veneralis. The description of U. ruckdescheli was based on the results of DNA barcoding and morphological examination.
