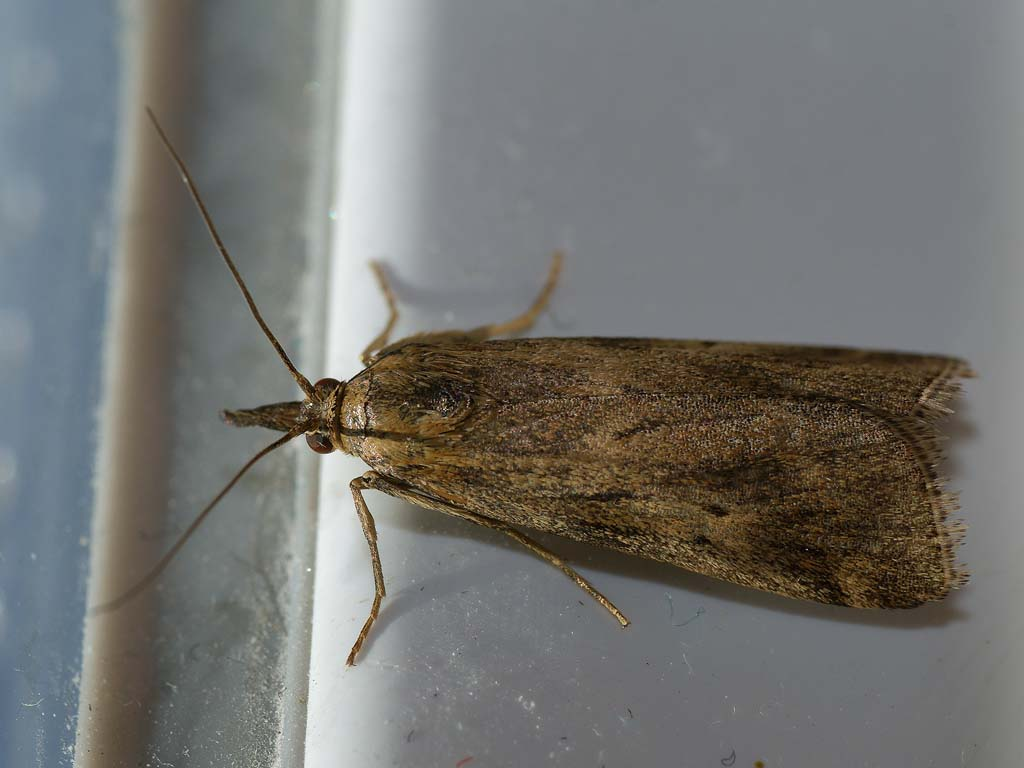

Scientific classification
- Domain: Eukaryota
- Kingdom: Animalia
- Phylum: Arthropoda
- Class: Insecta
- Order: Lepidoptera
- Family: Pyralidae
- Genus: Hypochalcia
- Species: H. propinquella

Binomial name
- Hypochalcia propinquella (Eversmann, 1842)

Synonyms
- Oncocera propinquella Guenee, 1845; Phycis propinquella Eversmann, 1842; Phycis brunneella Eversmann, 1844; Phycis candelisequella Eversmann, 1844; Hypochalcia disjunctella Zeller, 1848; Hypochalcia dispunctella Herrich-Schaffer, 1849; Hypochalcia ukrainae Filipjev, 1931; Phycis vesperella Eversmann, 1844; Oncocera bruandella Guenee, 1845; Hypochalcia affiniella Zeller, 1848; Hypochalcia burgundiella Ragonot, 1893; Hypochalcia subrubiginella Ragonot, 1887; Hypochalcia gianelliella Ragonot, 1887; Hypochalcia hepaticella Ragonot, 1887; Hypochalcia longobardella Ragonot, 1887; Hypochalcia romanovi Ragonot, 1893

= Hypochalcia propinquella =

Species of moth

Hypochalcia propinquella is a species of snout moth in the genus Hypochalcia. It was described by Eduard Friedrich Eversmann in 1842. It is found in Ukraine, Russia, France, Poland, Switzerland, Austria, Italy, Hungary, Romania and Bulgaria.

== Subspecies ==
- Hypochalcia propinquella propinquella (Ukraine, Russia)
- Hypochalcia propinquella bruandella (Guenee, 1845) (France, Poland, Switzerland, Austria, Italy, Hungary, Romania)
- Hypochalcia propinquella subrubiginella Ragonot, 1887 (Italy, Switzerland, Bulgaria)
