= Ethmia quadripunctella =

Scientific classification
- Domain: Eukaryota
- Kingdom: Animalia
- Phylum: Arthropoda
- Class: Insecta
- Order: Lepidoptera
- Family: Depressariidae
- Genus: Ethmia
- Species: E. quadripunctella

Binomial name
- Ethmia quadripunctella (Eversmann, 1844)

Synonyms
- Ypomeneuta quadripunctella Eversmann, 1844

Species of moth

Ethmia quadripunctella is a moth in the family Depressariidae. It is found in Russia.
