= Beautiful short-fingered gecko =

Conservation status
- Least Concern (IUCN 3.1)

Scientific classification
- Kingdom: Animalia
- Phylum: Chordata
- Class: Reptilia
- Order: Squamata
- Suborder: Gekkota
- Family: Gekkonidae
- Genus: Trigonodactylus
- Species: T. pulcher

Binomial name
- Trigonodactylus pulcher Anderson, 1896

Species of lizard

The beautiful short-fingered gecko (Trigonodactylus pulcher) is a gecko species in the genus Trigonodactylus. It is found in Saudi Arabia and Yemen.

== Etymology ==
Beautiful short-fingered gecko is named after Latin pulcher, meaning beautiful and fair.

== Habitat ==
This species occurs in sandy habitats close to the sea, including sand dunes. It can be locally common.
