= Epischidia caesariella =

Scientific classification
- Kingdom: Animalia
- Phylum: Arthropoda
- Class: Insecta
- Order: Lepidoptera
- Family: Pyralidae
- Genus: Epischidia
- Species: E. caesariella

Binomial name
- Epischidia caesariella (Hampson in Ragonot, 1901)

Synonyms
- Proceratia caesariella Hampson in Ragonot, 1901

Species of moth

Epischidia caesariella is a species of snout moth in the genus Epischidia. It was described by George Hampson in 1901 and is known from Turkey.
