= Epischidia =

Scientific classification
- Domain: Eukaryota
- Kingdom: Animalia
- Phylum: Arthropoda
- Class: Insecta
- Order: Lepidoptera
- Family: Pyralidae
- Subfamily: Phycitinae
- Tribe: Phycitini
- Genus: Epischidia; Rebel, 1901

Synonyms
- Epischidia Hampson, 1901; Proceratia Rebel, 1901; Proceratia Hampson, 1901

Genus of moths

Epischidia is a genus of snout moths. It was described by Rebel in 1901.

== Species ==
- Epischidia caesariella (Hampson in Ragonot, 1901)
- Epischidia fulvostrigella (Eversmann, 1844)
