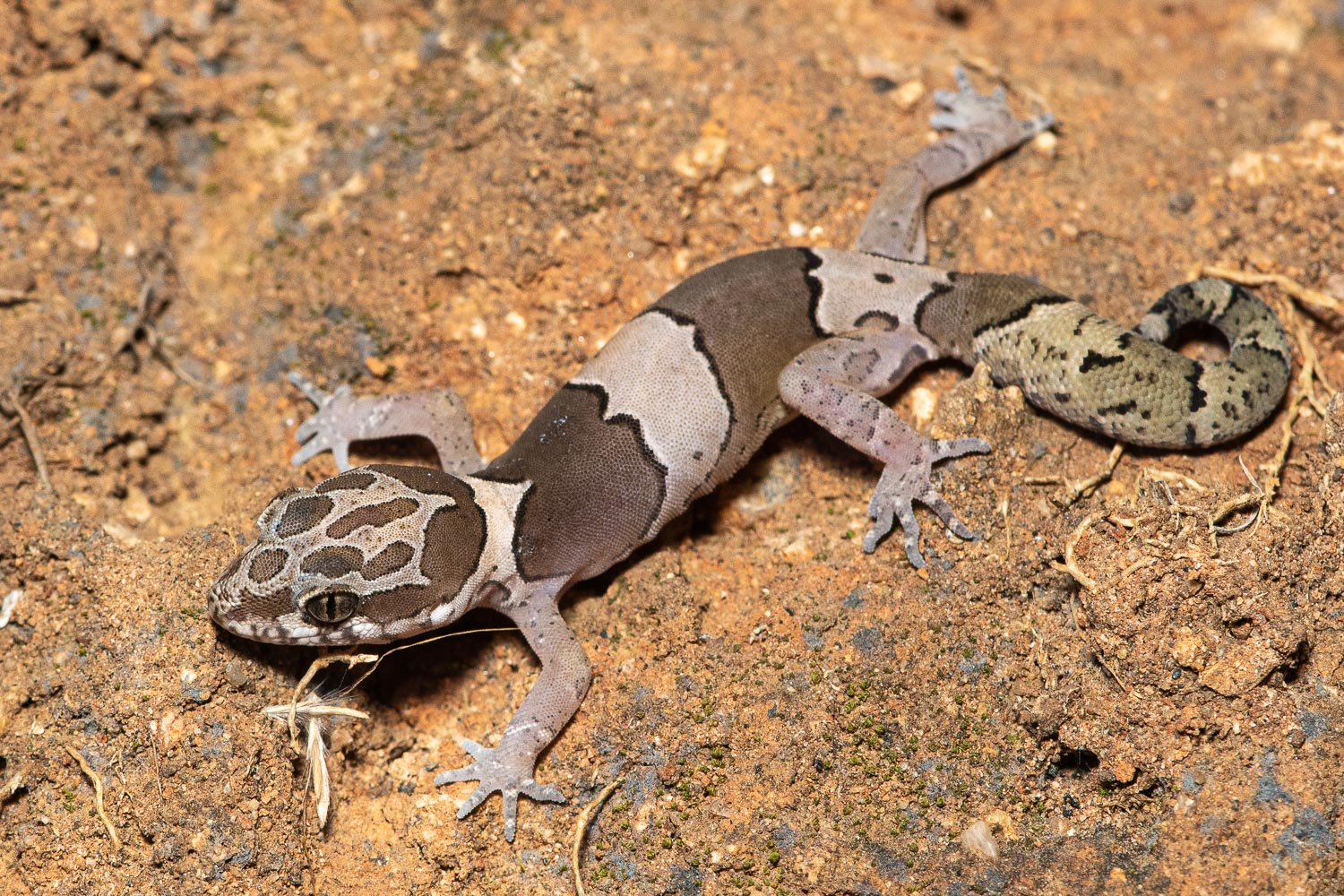
- Forest Spotted Gecko (C. speciosus) from Coimbatore, Tamil Nadu, India

Scientific classification
- Kingdom: Animalia
- Phylum: Chordata
- Class: Reptilia
- Order: Squamata
- Suborder: Gekkota
- Family: Gekkonidae
- Genus: Cyrtodactylus
- Species: C. speciosus

Binomial name
- Cyrtodactylus speciosus (Beddome, 1870)

Synonyms
- Gymnodactylus speciosus; Geckoella speciosus

= Forest spotted gecko =

Species of lizard

The forest spotted gecko or Erode ground gecko (Cyrtodactylus speciosus) is a species of gecko that is endemic to hills of South India, in parts of Eastern Ghats and Western Ghats. It was first described from hills near Erode in Tamil Nadu in 1870. Subsequently, this species was thought to be similar to Cyrtodactylus collegalensis, but recent studies have confirmed that they are distinct. This species has been sighted in hills around Coimbatore, Tirupur and Erode, in parts of the Eastern Ghats in Tamil Nadu.

== Habits and habitat ==
This species is nocturnal, where it begins its activity after dusk. It is insectivorous. This species reproduces by laying eggs. It is a terrestrial lizard that lives on the ground among thick leaf litter, pebbles and debris on the forest floor.

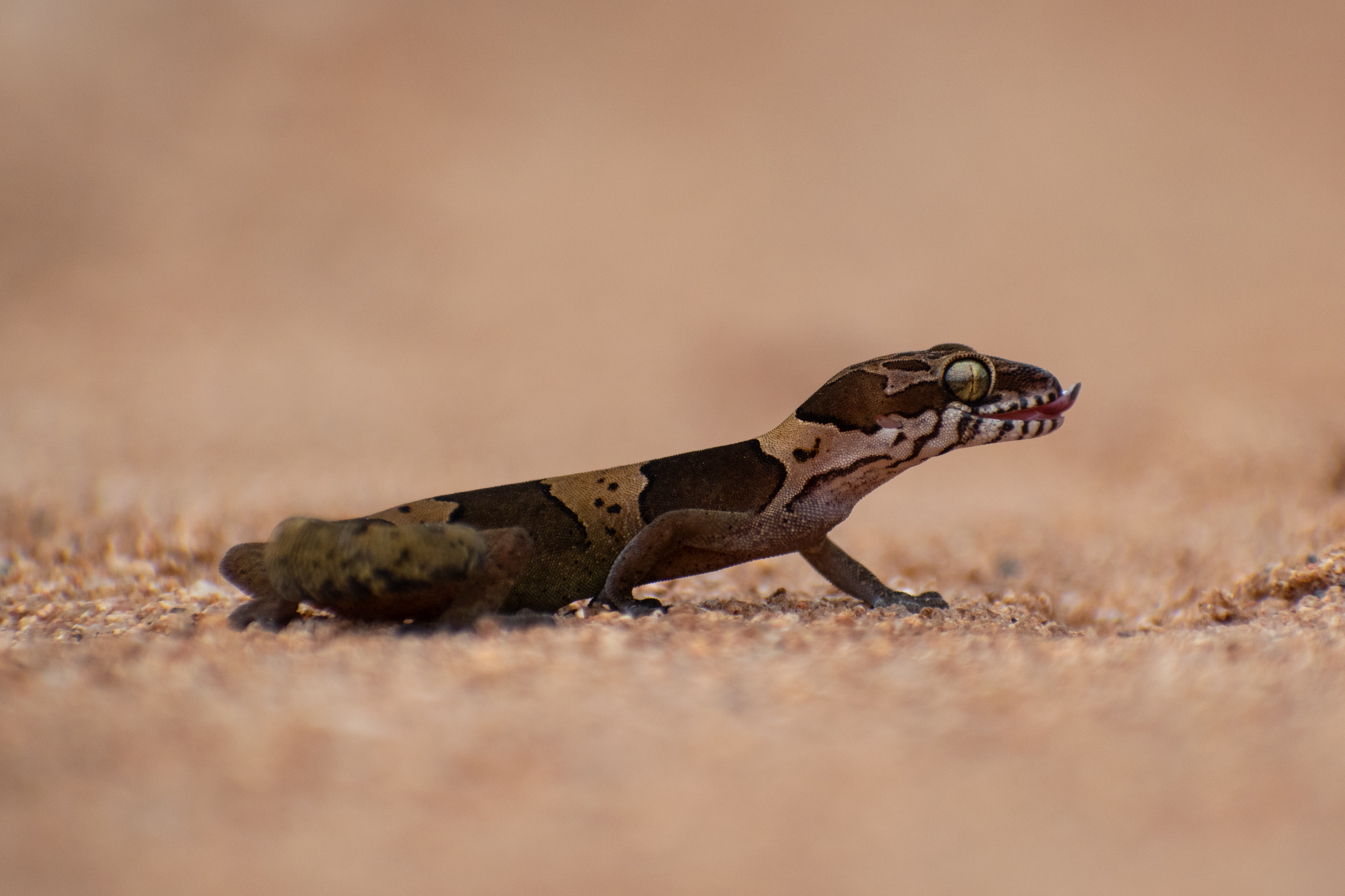
Forest spotted gecko / Erode bent-toed gecko (crytodactylus speciosus) in its natural habitat.
