= Trigonodactylus =

Scientific classification
- Kingdom: Animalia
- Phylum: Chordata
- Class: Reptilia
- Order: Squamata
- Suborder: Gekkota
- Family: Gekkonidae
- Subfamily: Gekkoninae
- Genus: Trigonodactylus; Haas, 1957

Genus of lizards

Trigonodactylus is a small genus of Middle-Eastern geckos.

== Species ==
- Trigonodactylus arabicus (Haas, 1957) – Arabian short-fingered gecko, Arabian sand gecko
- Trigonodactylus persicus Nazarov, Melnikov, Radjabizadeh, & Poyarkov, 2018
- Trigonodactylus pulcher Anderson, 1896 – beautiful short-fingered gecko
- Trigonodactylus sharqiyahensis Metallinou & Carranza, 2013
