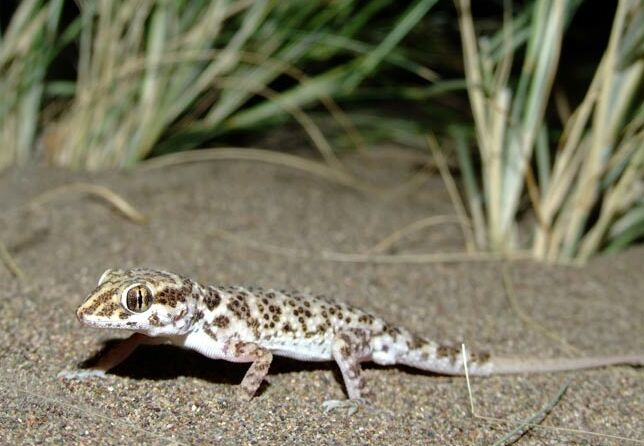

Conservation status
- Least Concern (IUCN 3.1)

Scientific classification
- Kingdom: Animalia
- Phylum: Chordata
- Class: Reptilia
- Order: Squamata
- Suborder: Gekkota
- Family: Gekkonidae
- Genus: Bunopus
- Species: B. tuberculatus

Binomial name
- Bunopus tuberculatus Blanford, 1874
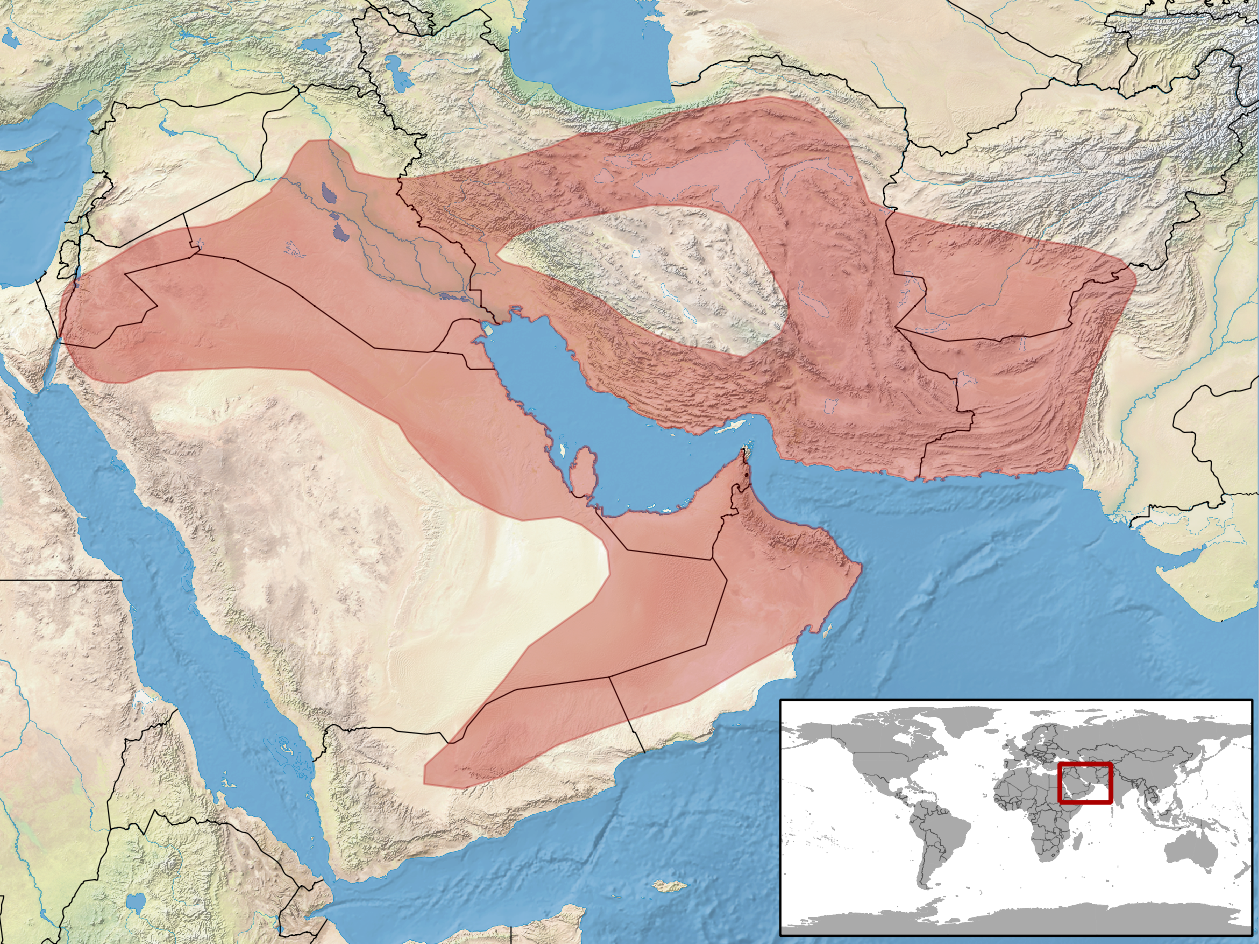

Synonyms
- Alsophylax tuberculatus; Alsophylax tuberculata; Stenodactylus lumsdeni; Bunopus gabrielis; Bunopus biporus; Bunopus abudhab

= Bunopus tuberculatus =

Species of lizard

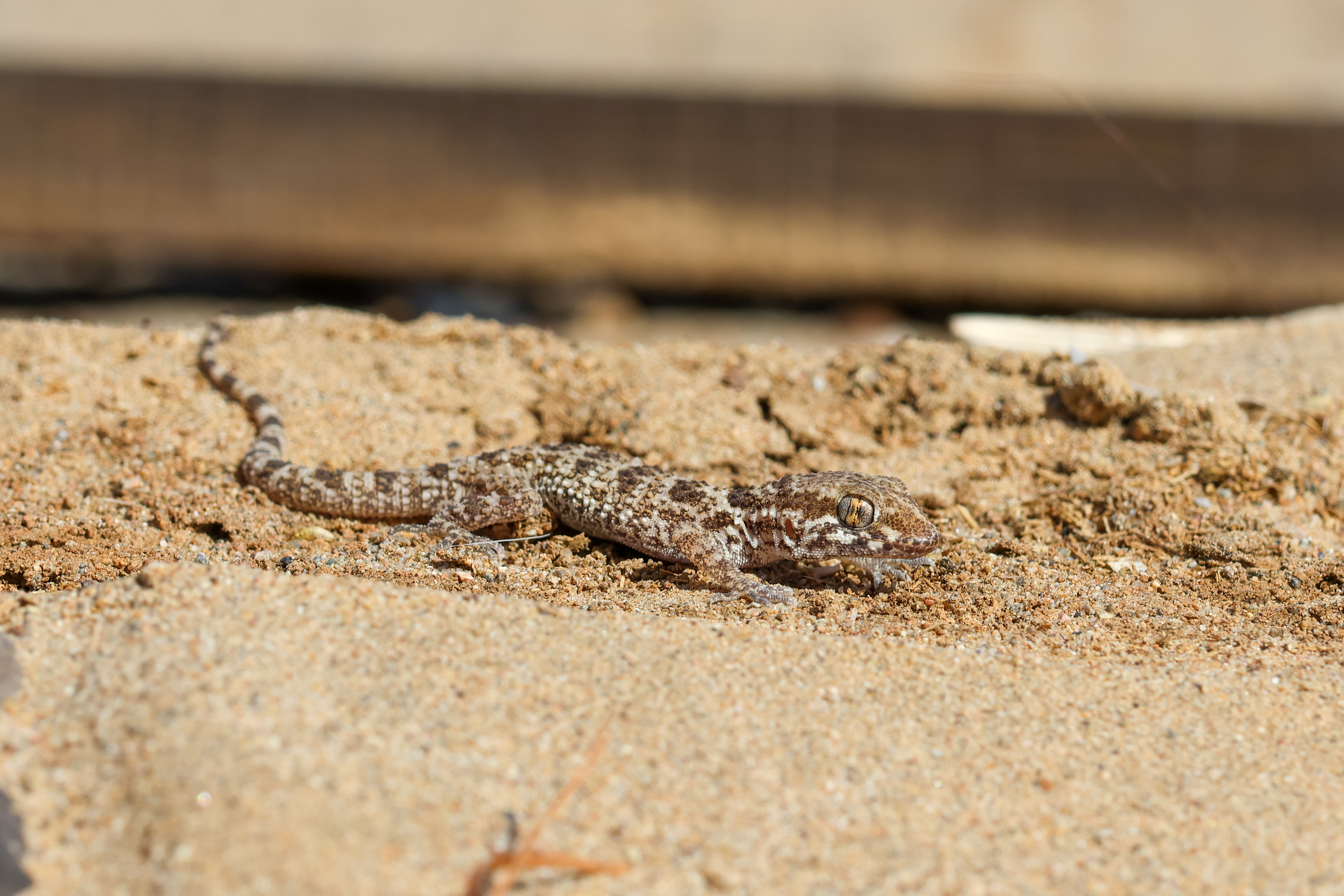
Bonupus tuberculatus from Saudi Arabia.

Bunopus tuberculatus, also known as the Baluch rock gecko, Arabian desert gecko, or southern tuberculated gecko is a species of gecko found in the Middle East.
