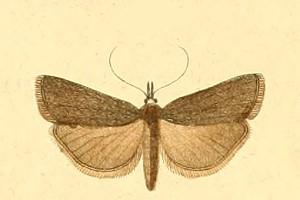
- Hypochalcia ahenella

Scientific classification
- Kingdom: Animalia
- Phylum: Arthropoda
- Clade: Pancrustacea
- Class: Insecta
- Order: Lepidoptera
- Family: Pyralidae
- Tribe: Phycitini
- Genus: Hypochalcia; Hübner, [1825]

Synonyms
- Araxes Stephens, 1834; Hypochalcea Hübner, 1826

= Hypochalcia =

Genus of moths

Hypochalcia is a genus of snout moths. It was described by Jacob Hübner in 1825.

== Species ==
- Hypochalcia ahenella (Denis & Schiffermüller, 1775)
- Hypochalcia balcanica Ragonot, 1887
- Hypochalcia decorella (Hübner, 1810)
- Hypochalcia dignella (Hübner, 1796)
- Hypochalcia fulvosquamella Ragonot, 1887
- Hypochalcia griseoaenella Ragonot, 1887
- Hypochalcia lignella (Hübner, 1796)
- Hypochalcia orbipunctella Ragonot, 1887
- Hypochalcia oxydella Ragonot, 1887
- Hypochalcia propinquella (Eversmann, 1842)
- Hypochalcia rayatella Amsel, 1959
- Hypochalcia staudingeri Ragonot, 1887
