= Cyrtodactylus irulaorum =

Scientific classification
- Kingdom: Animalia
- Phylum: Chordata
- Class: Reptilia
- Order: Squamata
- Suborder: Gekkota
- Family: Gekkonidae
- Genus: Cyrtodactylus
- Species: C. irulaorum

Binomial name
- Cyrtodactylus irulaorum Agarwal, Thackeray & Khandekar, 2023

Species of gecko

Cyrtodactylus irulaorum, the Irula geckoella, is a small species of gecko. It is endemic to the Kancheepuram and Tiruvallur districts of Tamil Nadu. It reaches about 5.1 cm (2 in) in snout–vent length and 8.3 cm (3 in) in total length. It, like the relict gecko, has a light tan coloring, that slowly changes to a dark brown.

== Etymology ==
The name for the gecko comes from the Irula people of Tamil Nadu, who are known as “The Snake People of South India”.
