= Hypochalcia rayatella =

Scientific classification
- Domain: Eukaryota
- Kingdom: Animalia
- Phylum: Arthropoda
- Class: Insecta
- Order: Lepidoptera
- Family: Pyralidae
- Genus: Hypochalcia
- Species: H. rayatella

Binomial name
- Hypochalcia rayatella Amsel, 1959

Species of moth

Hypochalcia rayatella is a species of snout moth in the genus Hypochalcia. It was described by Hans Georg Amsel in 1959 and is known from Iraq.
