= Hypochalcia orbipunctella =

Scientific classification
- Domain: Eukaryota
- Kingdom: Animalia
- Phylum: Arthropoda
- Class: Insecta
- Order: Lepidoptera
- Family: Pyralidae
- Genus: Hypochalcia
- Species: H. orbipunctella

Binomial name
- Hypochalcia orbipunctella Ragonot, 1887

Species of moth

Hypochalcia orbipunctella is a species of snout moth in the genus Hypochalcia. It was described by Ragonot in 1887. It is found in North Macedonia.

The wingspan is about 26 mm.
