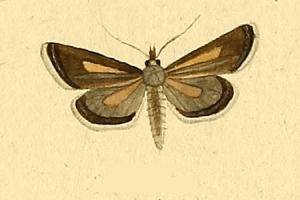

Scientific classification
- Kingdom: Animalia
- Phylum: Arthropoda
- Clade: Pancrustacea
- Class: Insecta
- Order: Lepidoptera
- Family: Pyralidae
- Genus: Hypochalcia
- Species: H. decorella

Binomial name
- Hypochalcia decorella (Hübner, 1810)

Synonyms
- Tinea decorella Hübner, 1810; Hypochalcia decorella erebella Ragonot, 1893; Phycis germarella Zincken, 1818

= Hypochalcia decorella =

Species of moth

Hypochalcia decorella is a species of snout moth in the genus Hypochalcia. It was described by Jacob Hübner in 1810. It is found from France to Russia and from Germany and Poland to Italy, Croatia, Hungary and Romania. It has also been recorded from Kazakhstan.
