= Trachydactylus hajarensis =

Scientific classification
- Kingdom: Animalia
- Phylum: Chordata
- Class: Reptilia
- Order: Squamata
- Suborder: Gekkota
- Family: Gekkonidae
- Genus: Trachydactylus
- Species: T. hajarensis

Binomial name
- Trachydactylus hajarensis (Arnold, 1980)

Synonyms
- Bunopus spatalurus hajarensis

Species of lizard

Trachydactylus hajarensis, the spacious rock gecko or banded ground gecko, is a species of lizard in the family Gekkonidae. It is found in Oman and the United Arab Emirates.
