= Hypochalcia oxydella =

Scientific classification
- Domain: Eukaryota
- Kingdom: Animalia
- Phylum: Arthropoda
- Class: Insecta
- Order: Lepidoptera
- Family: Pyralidae
- Genus: Hypochalcia
- Species: H. oxydella

Binomial name
- Hypochalcia oxydella Ragonot, 1887

Synonyms
- Hypochalcia castanella Ragonot, 1887

Species of moth

Hypochalcia oxydella is a species of snout moth in the genus Hypochalcia. It was described by Ragonot in 1887, and is known from the Tian Shan mountains.
