= Udea languidalis =

Scientific classification
- Kingdom: Animalia
- Phylum: Arthropoda
- Clade: Pancrustacea
- Class: Insecta
- Order: Lepidoptera
- Family: Crambidae
- Genus: Udea
- Species: U. languidalis

Binomial name
- Udea languidalis (Eversmann, 1842)

Synonyms
- Botys languidalis Eversmann, 1842; Botys arabescalis Herrich-Schäffer, 1860; Botys fimbriatalis ab. veneralis Staudinger, 1870

Species of moth

Udea languidalis is a species of moth in the family Crambidae. It is found on the Balkan Peninsula and in Ukraine, Russia, Turkey and Iran.
