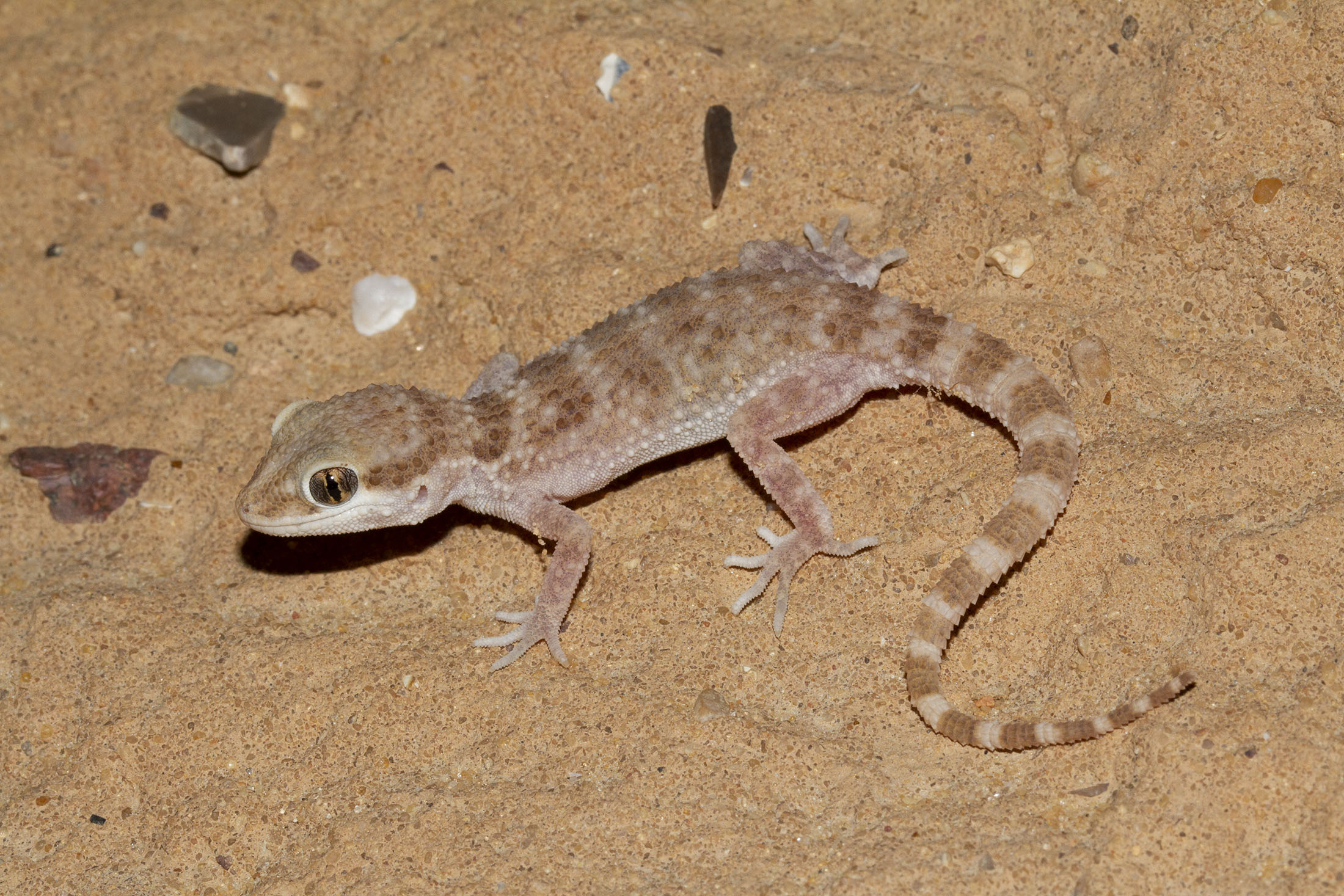
- Blanford's Tuberculated Gecko (Bunopus blanfordii) in Sheizaf Nature Reserve, Israel

Scientific classification
- Kingdom: Animalia
- Phylum: Chordata
- Class: Reptilia
- Order: Squamata
- Suborder: Gekkota
- Family: Gekkonidae
- Genus: Bunopus
- Species: B. blanfordii

Binomial name
- Bunopus blanfordii Strauch, 1887

Synonyms
- Bunopus blanfordii Strauch, 1887; Alsophylax blanfordii — Parker, 1931; Bunopus blanfordii — Y. Werner, 1991

= Bunopus blanfordii =

Species of lizard

Bunopus blanfordii, also known commonly as Blanford's ground gecko and Blanford's rock gecko, is a species of lizard in the family Gekkonidae. The species is native to Western Asia.

== Etymology ==
The specific name, blanfordii, is in honor of English naturalist William Thomas Blanford.

== Geographic range ==
B. blanfordii is found in Israel and Jordan.

== Reproduction ==
B. blanfordii is oviparous.
