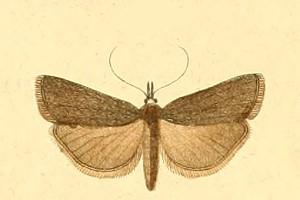

Scientific classification
- Domain: Eukaryota
- Kingdom: Animalia
- Phylum: Arthropoda
- Class: Insecta
- Order: Lepidoptera
- Family: Pyralidae
- Genus: Hypochalcia
- Species: H. ahenella

Binomial name
- Hypochalcia ahenella (Denis & Schiffermüller, 1775)

Synonyms
- Tinea ahenella Denis & Schiffermüller, 1775; Crambus obscuratus Haworth, 1796; Hypochalcia ghilianii Staudinger, 1870; Hypochalcia fasciatella Staudinger, 1881; Hypochalcia ahenella var. caucasica Ragonot, 1893; Hypochalcia hulstiella Ragonot, 1887; Hypochalcia lugubrella E. M. Hering, 1924; Hypochalcia robustella Toll, 1938; Oncocera arduella Bruand, 1848; Palparia tetrix Haworth, 1811; Phycis luridella Schläger, 1848; Phycis bistrigella Duponchel, 1836; Phycis fuliginella Duponchel, 1836; Phycis melanella var. bruneo-violaceella Bruand, 1850; Phycis rubiginella Treitschke, 1832; Tinea aeneella Hübner, 1796

= Hypochalcia ahenella =

Species of moth

Hypochalcia ahenella is a species of snout moth in the genus Hypochalcia. It was described by Michael Denis and Ignaz Schiffermüller in 1775 and is known from most of Europe, Turkey, and Texas in the US.

The wingspan is 23–32 mm. Adults are on wing from May to the end of August.

The larvae probably feed on Helianthemum species and/or Artemisia campestris.
