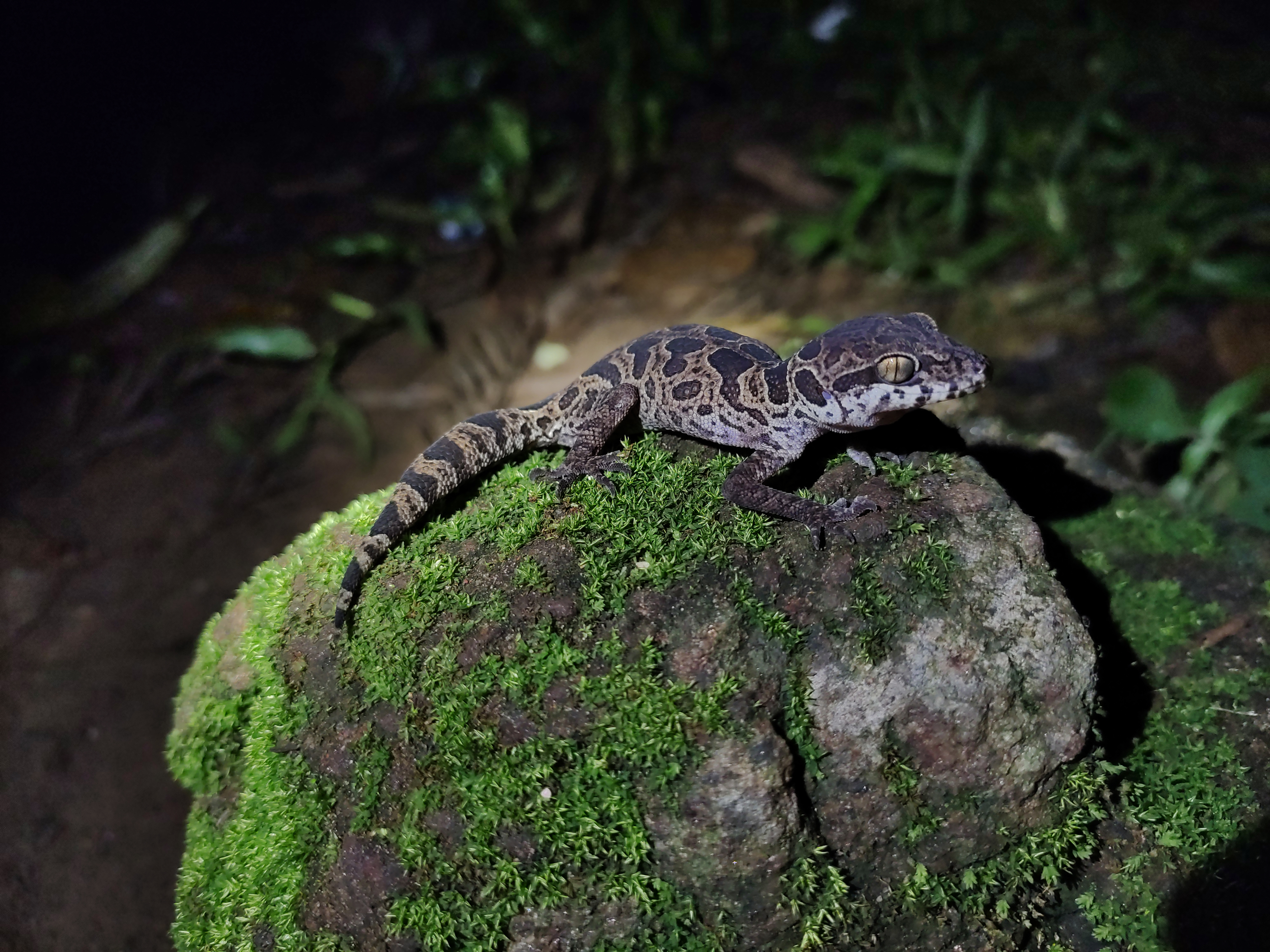

Conservation status
- Endangered (IUCN 3.1)
- CITES Appendix II

Scientific classification
- Kingdom: Animalia
- Phylum: Chordata
- Class: Reptilia
- Order: Squamata
- Suborder: Gekkota
- Family: Gekkonidae
- Genus: Cyrtodactylus
- Species: C. jeyporensis

Binomial name
- Cyrtodactylus jeyporensis (Beddome, 1877)

Synonyms
- Gymnodactylus jeyporensis Beddome, 1877; Geckoella jeyporensis

= Cyrtodactylus jeyporensis =

Species of lizard

Cyrtodactylus jeyporensis, also known as the Jeypore Indian gecko, the Jeypore ground gecko, or the Patinghe Indian gecko, is an endangered species of gecko found in India, which was until recently considered extinct. Described from a single specimen in 1877, it was rediscovered in 2010 in the Eastern Ghats of Odisha state, India.

== Discovery and rediscovery ==
The species was described in 1877 by then Lt Col Richard Henry Beddome of the Madras Presidency Army, from a single male specimen obtained from the woods on "Patinghe hill" in the Jeypore forests of present-day Odisha, at an altitude of 1,300 metres (4,200 ft). The holotype is deposited as BNHM 82.5.22.37 in the Natural History Museum (earlier British Museum of natural history).

In 2009, Ishan Aggarwal, a doctoral student at the Centre for Ecological Sciences, Indian Institute of Sciences, Bangalore, started working on the genus Geckoella. He hoped to rediscover this "lost" species as it would help piece together the evolutionary history of the genus. The search began with piecing together the route of Beddome's explorations in the Eastern Ghats. After many months of research, the CES and the Bombay Natural History Society (BNHS) put together expeditions in high elevation areas of the Eastern Ghats in southern Odisha in September 2010 and northern Andhra Pradesh in November 2011.

A sub-adult male lizard was collected on 20 September 2010 in Koraput district, Odisha, by Ishan Agarwal and Aniruddha Datta-Roy of CES which was deposited in the collection of the BNHS. A second specimen, an adult male, was recorded on 9 October 2011 from Galikonda, Visakhapatnam district, Andhra Pradesh extending its known distribution range.

== Description ==
Description of type, male specimen, collected in Jeypore by Beddome in 1877:

Head rather large, oviform; snout longer than the diameter of the orbit or the distance between the eye and the ear-opening; forehead and loreal region slightly concave; ear-opening an oblique slit, three fifths the diameter of the eye. Body depressed, rather short. Limbs moderate; digits rather short, cylindrical in their basal, compressed in their distal portion, with enlarged plates beneath. Head covered with large subequal flat granules; rostral quadrangular, twice as broad as deep, with median cleft above; nostril pierced between the rostral, the first labial, and three nasals; 10 upper and 7 lower labials; mental triangular; a pair of large chin-shields forming a suture behind the point of the mental, surrounded by much smaller chin-shields. Body covered above with uniform juxtaposed large squarish or hexagonal flat scales arranged regularly like the bricks of a wall. Abdominal scales smooth, round, imbricate, not half the size of the dorsals. No enlarged preanal or femoral scales or pores. Tail cylindrical, tapering, slightly swollen, covered with uniform, rather large smooth scales, which are imbricate beneath. Light yellowish brown above, with large reddish-brown, black-edged spots arranged in pairs; two transverse spots on the nape, the posterior crescent-shaped; head with small darker spots and a streak from the eye to the ear; lips and side of throat with small brown dots and marblings; lower surfaces brownish white.

The snout to vent length is 5 cm (2 in).

Measurements :

- Total length : 92 millimetres (3.6 in)
- Head : 16 millimetres (0.63 in)
- Width of body : 11 millimetres (0.43 in)
- Body : 38 millimetres (1.5 in)
- Forelimb : 20 millimetres (0.79 in)
- Hindlimb : 27 millimetres (1.1 in)
- Tail : 38 millimetres (1.5 in)

== Distribution ==
The lizard appears to inhabit semi-evergreen forests in high elevation areas (> 1,200 metres (3,900 ft)) of the Eastern Ghats of southern Odisha and northern Andhra Pradesh. However, the areas where the lizard has been found are under tremendous pressure from deforestation and mining. The taxon is surmised to possibly be a wet-zone relict stranded by the aridification of peninsular India.
