= Crossobamon orientalis =

Scientific classification
- Kingdom: Animalia
- Phylum: Chordata
- Class: Reptilia
- Order: Squamata
- Suborder: Gekkota
- Family: Gekkonidae
- Genus: Crossobamon
- Species: C. orientalis

Binomial name
- Crossobamon orientalis (Blanford, 1876)

Synonyms
- Stenodactylus orientalis Blanford, 1876; Stenodactylus dunstervillei Murray, 1884; Stenodactylus orientalis — Boulenger, 1885; Crossobamon orientalis — Rösler, 1995

Species of lizard

Crossobamon orientalis, commonly called the Sind gecko, is a species of gecko, a lizard in the family Gekkonidae. The species is endemic to South Asia.

== Geographic range ==
C. orientalis is found in Pakistan (Sindh: Rohri and Shikarpur Districts) and India (Rajasthan: Jaisalmer district).

Type locality: "Rohri and Shikarpur District, Upper Sind".
