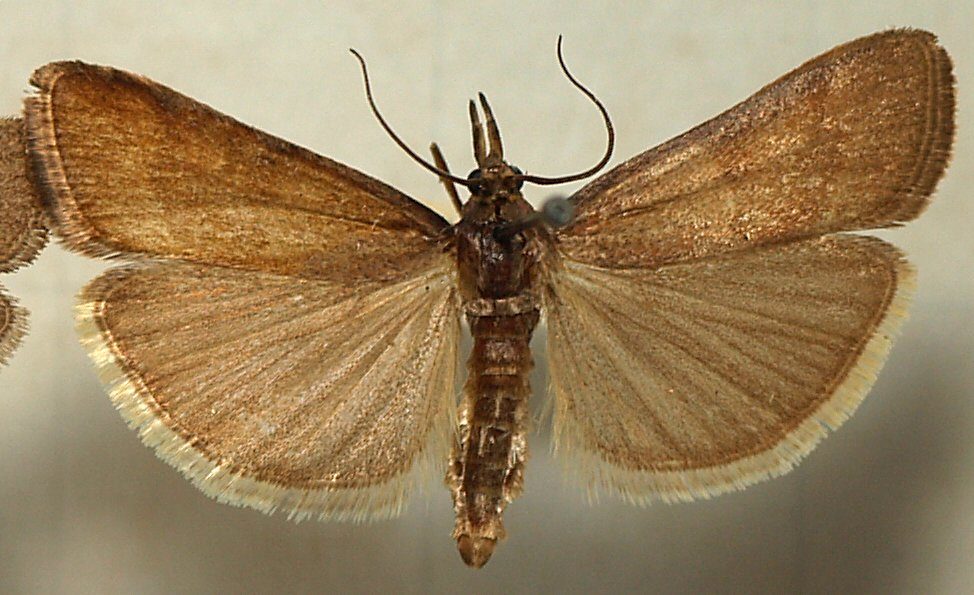

Scientific classification
- Kingdom: Animalia
- Phylum: Arthropoda
- Clade: Pancrustacea
- Class: Insecta
- Order: Lepidoptera
- Family: Pyralidae
- Genus: Hypochalcia
- Species: H. lignella

Binomial name
- Hypochalcia lignella Hübner, 1796

Synonyms
- Phycis melanella Treitschke, 1832; Hypochalcia melanella; Tinea lignella Hubner, 1796; Hypochalcia rufivinea Osthelder, 1938; Hypochalcia delineata Filipjev, 1927

= Hypochalcia lignella =

Species of moth

Hypochalcia lignella is a moth of the family Pyralidae. It is found in central Europe, east to Russia.
