= Hypochalcia balcanica =

Scientific classification
- Domain: Eukaryota
- Kingdom: Animalia
- Phylum: Arthropoda
- Class: Insecta
- Order: Lepidoptera
- Family: Pyralidae
- Genus: Hypochalcia
- Species: H. balcanica

Binomial name
- Hypochalcia balcanica Ragonot, 1887

Species of moth

Hypochalcia balcanica is a species of snout moth in the genus Hypochalcia. It was described by Ragonot in 1887. It is found in Romania and Bulgaria.

The wingspan is 30 mm for males and 24 mm for females.
