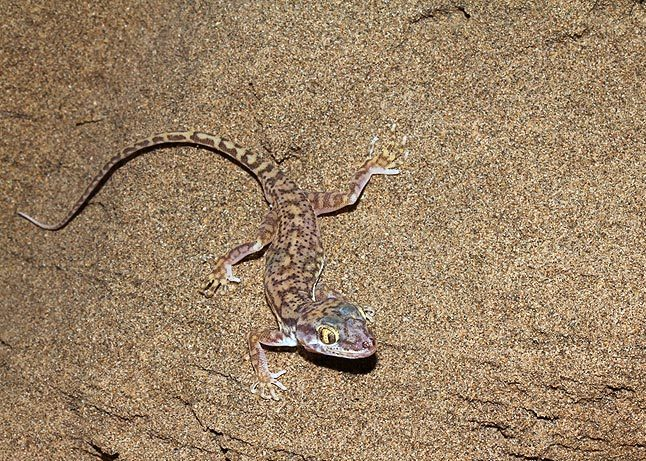

Conservation status
- Least Concern (IUCN 3.1)

Scientific classification
- Kingdom: Animalia
- Phylum: Chordata
- Class: Reptilia
- Order: Squamata
- Suborder: Gekkota
- Family: Gekkonidae
- Genus: Crossobamon
- Species: C. eversmanni

Binomial name
- Crossobamon eversmanni (Wiegmann, 1834)

Synonyms
- Gymnodactylus eversmanni Wiegmann, 1834; Crossobamon atropunctatus Lichtenstein & von Martens, 1856; Gymnodactylus atropunctatus — Boulenger, 1885; Stenodactylus lumsdenii Boulenger, 1887; Stenodactylus maynardi M.A. Smith, 1933; Crossobamon eversmanni — Wermuth, 1965

= Crossobamon eversmanni =

Species of gecko

Crossobamon eversmanni, also known commonly as the comb-toed gecko, is a species of Asian gecko, a lizard in the family Gekkonidae.

== Etymology ==
The specific name, eversmanni, is in honor of Russian-German entomologist Alexander Eduard Friedrich Eversmann.

== Geographic range ==
C. eversmanni is found in Iran, Pakistan, and several other countries of Central Asia.

== Habitat ==
The preferred natural habitat of C. eversmanni is sandy areas of desert, grassland, and shrubland, at altitudes of 550–1,463 m (1,804–4,800 ft).

== Behavior ==
C. eversmanni is terrestrial, nocturnal, and lives in burrows.

== Reproduction ==
C. eversmanni is oviparous. A sexually mature female may lay 2–3 clutches per year, with 1–2 eggs in each clutch.

== Subspecies ==
Two subspecies are recognized as being valid, including the nominotypical subspecies.

- Crossobamon eversmanni eversmanni (Wiegmann, 1834)
- Crossobamon eversmanni lumsdenii (Boulenger, 1887)

Nota bene: A trinomial authority in parentheses indicates that the subspecies was originally described in a genus other than Crossobamon.
