= Trigonodactylus sharqiyahensis =

Scientific classification
- Kingdom: Animalia
- Phylum: Chordata
- Class: Reptilia
- Order: Squamata
- Suborder: Gekkota
- Family: Gekkonidae
- Genus: Trigonodactylus
- Species: T. sharqiyahensis

Binomial name
- Trigonodactylus sharqiyahensis Metallinou & Carranza, 2013

Species of lizard

Trigonodactylus sharqiyahensis is a gecko of the genus Trigonodactylus that is endemic to Oman.
