= Hypochalcia fulvosquamella =

Scientific classification
- Domain: Eukaryota
- Kingdom: Animalia
- Phylum: Arthropoda
- Class: Insecta
- Order: Lepidoptera
- Family: Pyralidae
- Genus: Hypochalcia
- Species: H. fulvosquamella

Binomial name
- Hypochalcia fulvosquamella Ragonot, 1887

Species of moth

Hypochalcia fulvosquamella is a species of snout moth in the genus Hypochalcia. It was described by Ragonot in 1887. It was described from Ala-Tau.
