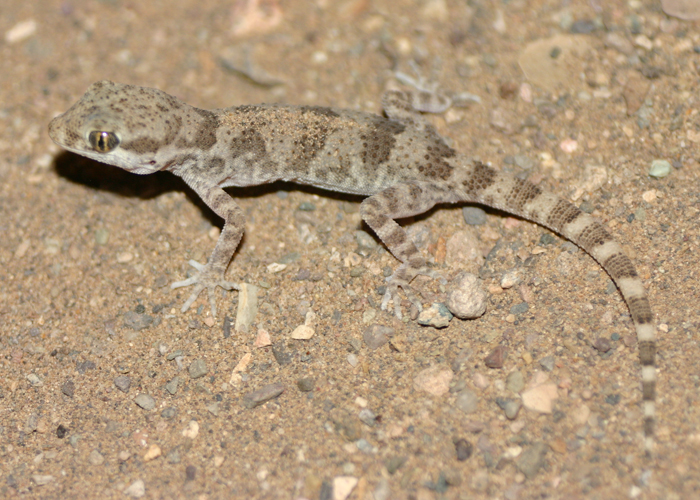

Conservation status
- Data Deficient (IUCN 3.1)

Scientific classification
- Kingdom: Animalia
- Phylum: Chordata
- Class: Reptilia
- Order: Squamata
- Suborder: Gekkota
- Family: Gekkonidae
- Genus: Bunopus
- Species: B. crassicauda

Binomial name
- Bunopus crassicauda Nikolsky, 1907

Synonyms
- Alsophylax crassicauda; Bunopus crassicaudus

= Bunopus crassicauda =

Species of lizard

Bunopus crassicauda, also known as the thickhead rock gecko or thick-tailed tuberculated gecko, is a species of gecko endemic to Iran.
