= Hypochalcia dignella =

Scientific classification
- Kingdom: Animalia
- Phylum: Arthropoda
- Clade: Pancrustacea
- Class: Insecta
- Order: Lepidoptera
- Family: Pyralidae
- Genus: Hypochalcia
- Species: H. dignella

Binomial name
- Hypochalcia dignella (Hübner, 1796)

Synonyms
- Tinea dignella Hübner, 1796; Hypochalcia dignella insuadella Ragonot, 1893

Species of moth

Hypochalcia dignella is a species of snout moth in the genus Hypochalcia. It was described by Jacob Hübner in 1796. It is found in France, Austria, Slovakia, Hungary, Bosnia and Herzegovina, Romania, Bulgaria, Ukraine and Russia. It has also been recorded from Kazakhstan.
