= Trachydactylus spatalurus =

Conservation status
- Least Concern (IUCN 3.1)

Scientific classification
- Kingdom: Animalia
- Phylum: Chordata
- Class: Reptilia
- Order: Squamata
- Suborder: Gekkota
- Family: Gekkonidae
- Genus: Trachydactylus
- Species: T. spatalurus

Binomial name
- Trachydactylus spatalurus (Anderson, 1901)
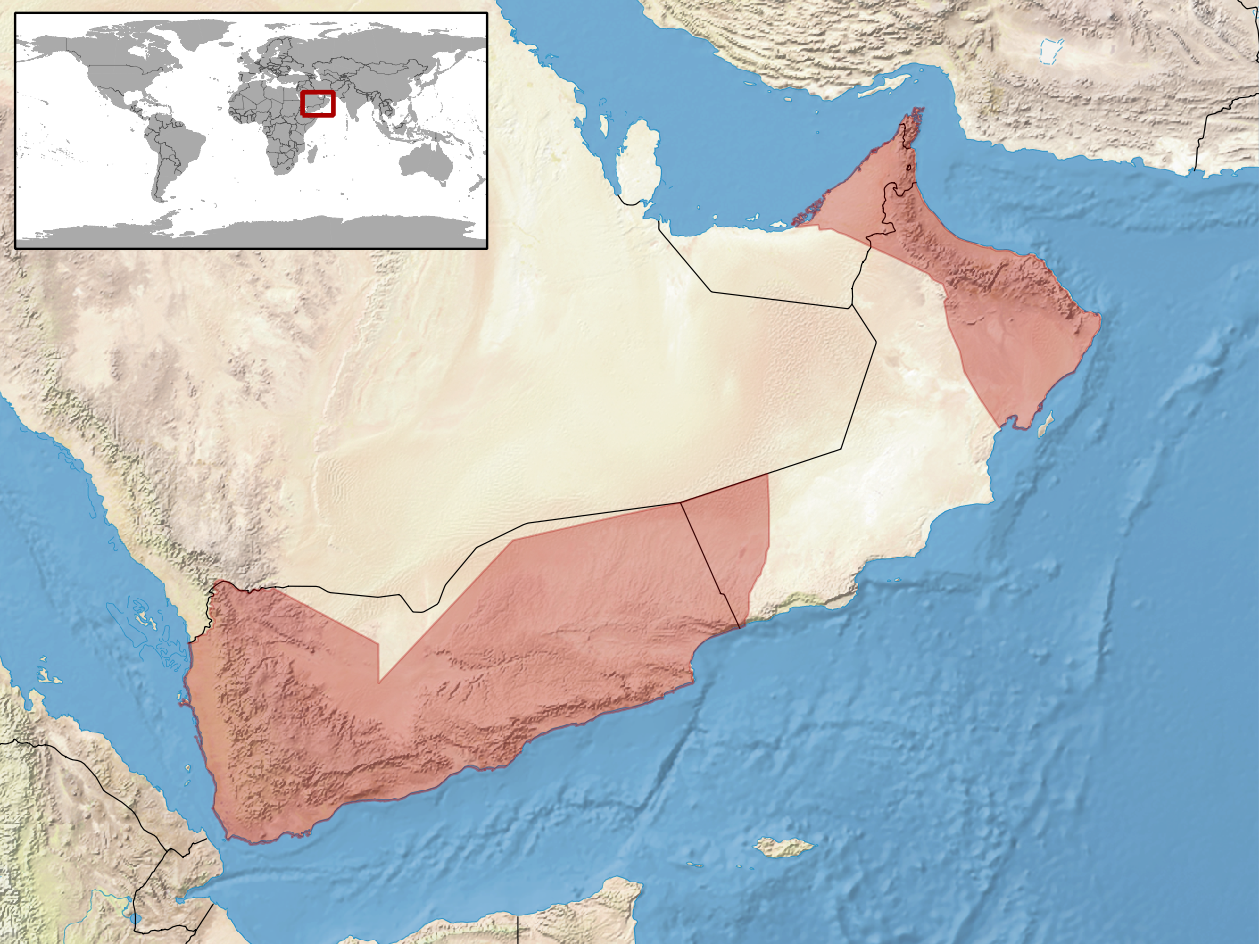

Synonyms
- Bunopus spatalurus Anderson, 1901; Trachydactylus jolensis Haas & Battersby, 1959

Species of lizard

Trachydactylus spatalurus, the spacious rock gecko or banded ground gecko, is a species of lizard in the family Gekkonidae. It is found in Oman and Yemen.
