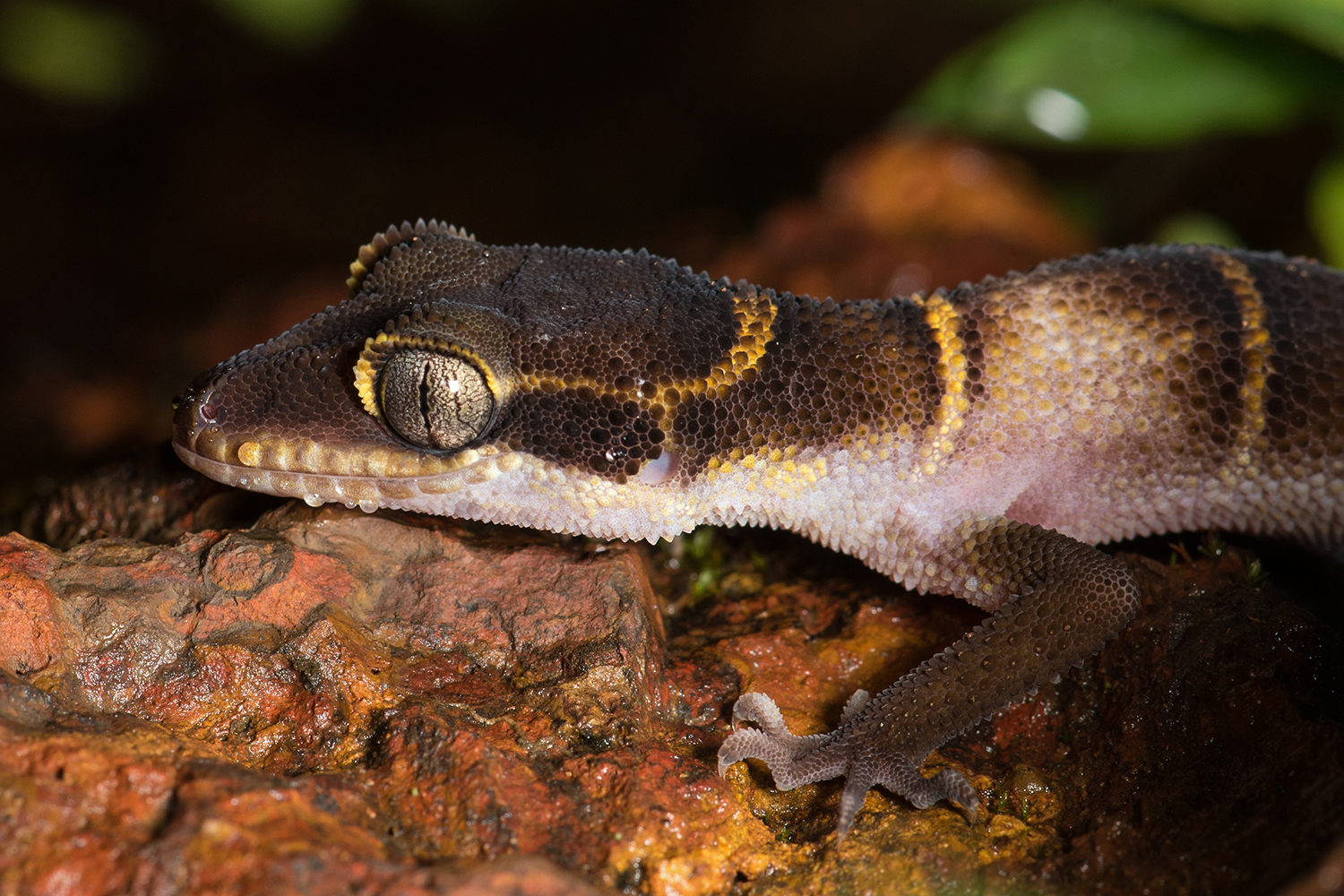
- Adult C. albofasciatus
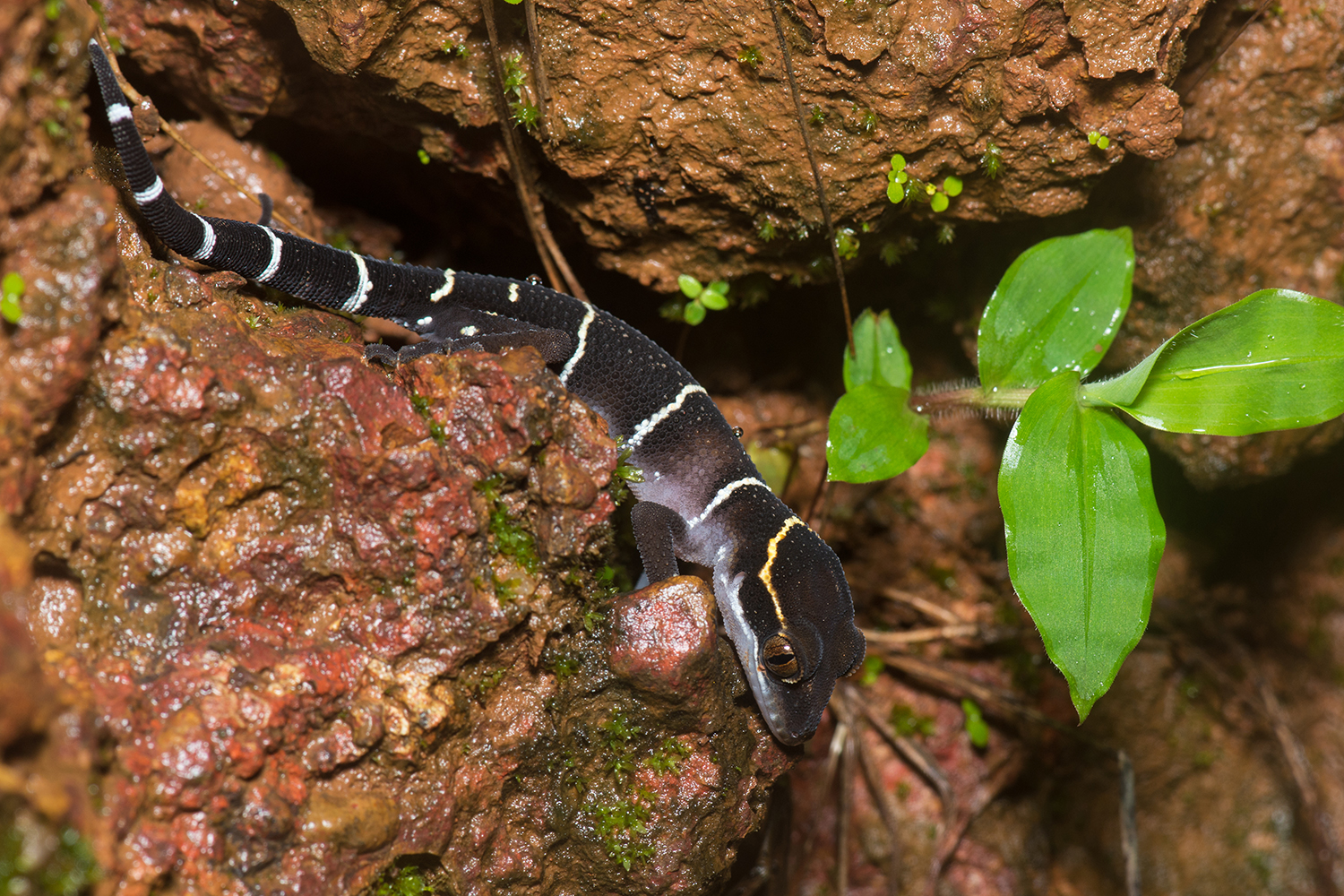
- Juvenile C. albofasciatus

Conservation status
- Least Concern (IUCN 3.1)

Scientific classification
- Kingdom: Animalia
- Phylum: Chordata
- Class: Reptilia
- Order: Squamata
- Suborder: Gekkota
- Family: Gekkonidae
- Genus: Cyrtodactylus
- Species: C. albofasciatus

Binomial name
- Cyrtodactylus albofasciatus (Boulenger, 1885)

Synonyms
- Gymnodactylus albofasciatus Boulenger, 1885; Geckoella albofasciatus (Boulenger, 1885)

= Cyrtodactylus albofasciatus =

Species of lizard

Cyrtodactylus albofasciatus, also known as Boulenger's Indian gecko or Deccan banded gecko, is a species of gecko. It is endemic to the Western Ghats, India. It was resurrected from synonymy of Cyrtodactylus deccanensis in 2004.
