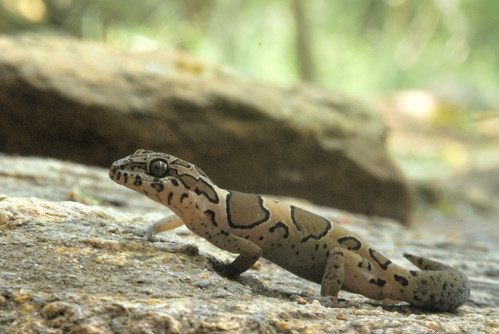

Conservation status
- Least Concern (IUCN 3.1)

Scientific classification
- Kingdom: Animalia
- Phylum: Chordata
- Class: Reptilia
- Order: Squamata
- Suborder: Gekkota
- Family: Gekkonidae
- Genus: Cyrtodactylus
- Species: C. collegalensis

Binomial name
- Cyrtodactylus collegalensis (Beddome, 1870)

Synonyms
- Geckoella collegalensis Cyrtodactylus nebulosus (part)

= Cyrtodactylus collegalensis =

Species of lizard

Cyrtodactylus collegalensis, also known as the Kollegal ground gecko or forest spotted gecko, is a species of gecko found in and around Mysore hills, at the junction of the Western Ghats and the Eastern Ghats, in South India. Recent taxonomic works and genetic studies revealed that the formerly-supposed genus is actually a subgenus of the widespread genus Cyrtodactylus. It is often confused with the forest spotted gecko (Cyrtodactylus speciosus).

== Habits and habitat ==
They are primarily ground-dwelling, hiding under thick leaf-litter. They are nocturnal and insectivorous. Some species in this group have been documented to lay eggs. They live in forests, be it dry, mixed or wet in complexion, mainly along the hilly tracts.

== Distribution ==
The gecko was described in 1870 from BR Hills in Southern Karnataka. It was treated as synonymous with Cyrtodactylus nebulosus by Boulenger. It has later been reported from found in adjacent hill ranges of Eastern Ghats and Western Ghats, at the junction of Maharashtra, Karnataka, Kerala and Tamil Nadu states, in South India. In Sri Lanka, its presence is considered dubious.
