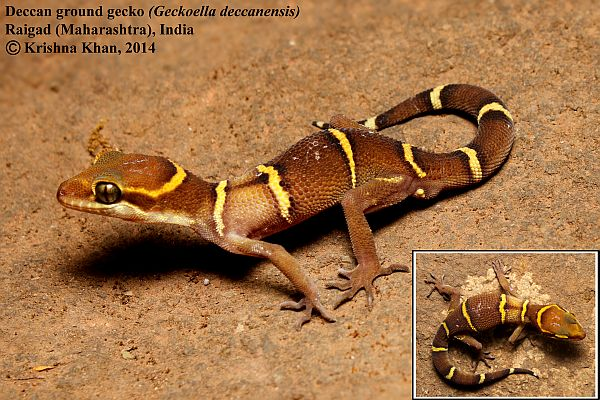
- An adult male from Raigad

Conservation status
- Least Concern (IUCN 3.1)

Scientific classification
- Kingdom: Animalia
- Phylum: Chordata
- Class: Reptilia
- Order: Squamata
- Suborder: Gekkota
- Family: Gekkonidae
- Genus: Cyrtodactylus
- Species: C. deccanensis

Binomial name
- Cyrtodactylus deccanensis (Günther, 1864)

Synonyms
- Gymnodactylus deccanensis Günther, 1864; Geckoella deccanensis (Günther, 1864)

= Cyrtodactylus deccanensis =

Species of lizard

Cyrtodactylus deccanensis, also commonly known as Deccan ground gecko, Günther's Indian gecko, or the banded ground gecko, is a species of gecko found in the northern Western Ghats of India. It has been found from northern Maharashtra, with a habitat range possibly extending to southern Gujarat. Cyrtodactylus albofasciatus was previously considered conspecific with Cyrtodactylus deccanensis but is now accepted as a valid species.

== Description ==
Their head is rather large, oviform, snout longer than the diameter of the orbit or the distance between the eye and the ear-opening; forehead and loreal region concave; ear-opening suboval, vertical, about one third the diameter of the eye. Body moderately elongate, depressed. Its limbs are rather long; digits moderately elongate, cylindrical in the basal, compressed in the distal portion; the plates under the basal phalanx are very small, little larger than the surrounding tubercles. The head is covered with convex granules, largest on the snout and temples; rostral quadrangular, not quite twice as broad as deep, with median cleft above; nostril pierced between the rostral, the first labial, and three nasals; 9 to 11 upper and as many lower labials; mental triangular or pentagonal; a pair of large chin-shields, forming a long suture behind the point of the mental, in contact externally and posteriorly with two smaller pairs. Body covered above with large juxtaposed subequal tubercles arranged in more or less regular transverse series; these tubercles flat or very slightly keeled, generally with a small raised point in the centre. Abdominal scales round, smooth, sub-imbricate, much smaller than dorsals. Males with enlarged preanal and femoral scales, but without pores. Tail cylindrical, tapering, covered with uniform smooth scales arranged in rings. Reddish brown above, with narrow white, black-edged cross bars; the first semicircular, extending from one eye to the other across the nape; a second on the scapular region, two on the body, and a fifth on the sacrum; similar bands forming annuli round the tail; lower surfaces whitish. From snout to vent 2.5 inches; tail 2.25.

The type locality is "Deccan", Bombay Presidency.

Günther (1864) described Gymnodactylus (Geckoella) deccanensis on the basis of a single specimen collected "in the Deccan". Being a nocturnal species that lives in forests they are rarely encountered. The deccan ground gecko lives on forest floors and is insectivorous. Common in the Northern Western Ghats, this species has been reported in Sanjay Gandhi National Park, Matheran, Khandala, Phansad Wildlife Sanctuary, Tungareshwar Wildlife Sanctuary, Koyna Wildlife Sanctuary, and also from Tamhini Ghat. It has been recently reported from Saputara Hills, in the Dang District of Gujarat. Some taxonomic authorities still place this species in the genus Geckoella.
