= Cyrtodactylus yakhuna =

Scientific classification
- Kingdom: Animalia
- Phylum: Chordata
- Order: Squamata
- Suborder: Gekkota
- Family: Gekkonidae
- Genus: Cyrtodactylus
- Species: C. yakhuna

Binomial name
- Cyrtodactylus yakhuna (Deraniyagala, 1945)

Synonyms
- Gymnodactylus yakhuna Deraniyagala, 1945; Geckoella yakhuna (Deraniyagala, 1945)

Species of lizard

Cyrtodactylus yakhuna, also known as the northern Sri Lanka gecko, spotted bow-fingered gecko, blotch bow-fingered gecko, or demon gecko, is a species of gecko endemic to northern Sri Lanka.

== Habitat and distribution ==
It is a dainty, ground-dwelling gecko from the dry plains of the north, below 300m of Sri Lanka. Known areas of occurrence lies in the North East and North Central Provinces (ssp. yakhuna) and North West Provinces (ssp. zonatus), in localities such as Mannar, Puttalam, Puliyankulam, Polonnaruwa, Giritale, Sigiriya, and Menikdena.13-KADIGAWA (NIKAWERATIYA).

== Description ==
Its body is stout, cylindrical, and covered with small, granular scales. Scales on the venter overlap. The tail is heavy, tapering, and regenerated tail is turnip-shaped. Supralabials 9-10. Infra-labials 7-9. Subcaudal scales are not distinctly enlarged. The dorsum has two cross rows of dark blotches. In subspecies G. y. yakhuna, the blotches consist of two sub-rectangular marks, with intervening light areas with numerous black spots. In subspecies G. y. zonatus, the blotches are two dark brown transverse rows of large cross bands, which are equal to or shorter than the light interspaces. The tail has dark bands.

== Ecology and diet ==
It inhabits deciduous and scrub forests. It is crepuscular, hiding under rotting timber and leaves during the day and emerging at dusk to forage on small arthropods, such as termites.

== Reproduction ==
Four eggs are laid at a time, in the month of January. Incubation period is 95 days.
