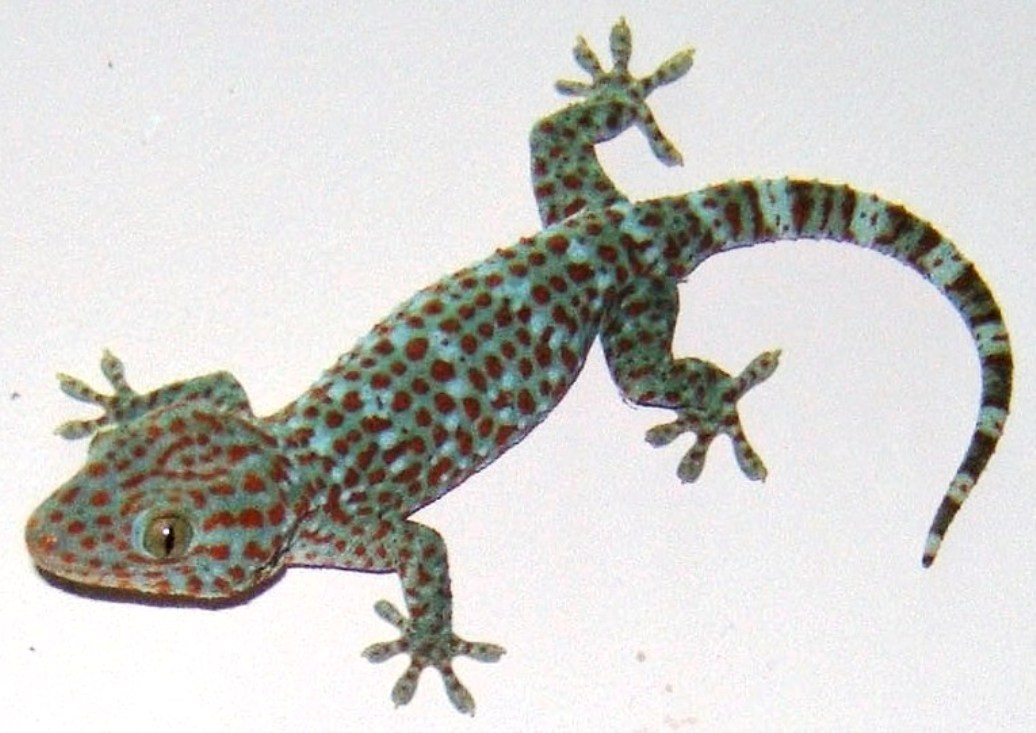
- Gekko gecko, the 'Tokay': type species

Scientific classification
- Kingdom: Animalia
- Phylum: Chordata
- Class: Reptilia
- Order: Squamata
- Suborder: Gekkota
- Family: Gekkonidae
- Subfamily: Gekkoninae; Gray, 1825

Genera
- 30; see text

= Gekkoninae =

Subfamily of lizards

Gekkoninae is a diverse subfamily of the family Gekkonidae, geckos. It has the most species and genera — over 850 species in 30 genera. Hemidactylus and Cyrtodactylus together account for 185 species.

== Genera ==
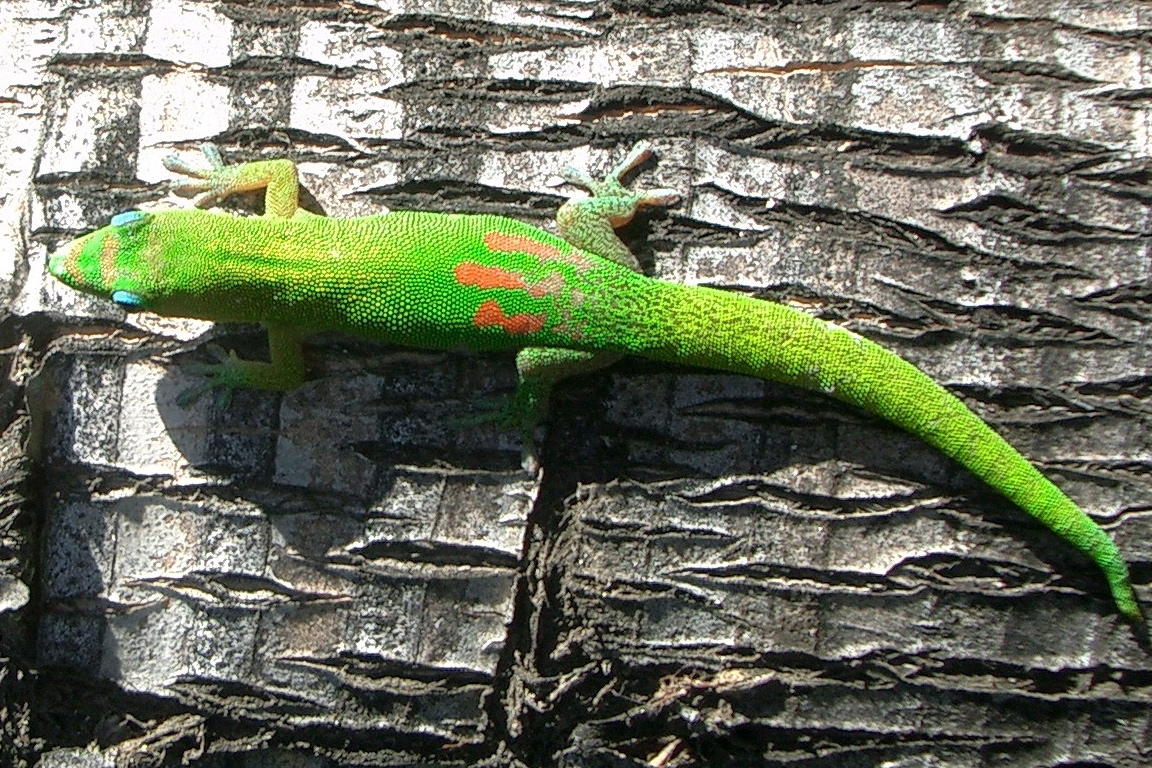
A gold dust day gecko (genus Phelsuma) in Kailua-Kona, Hawaii

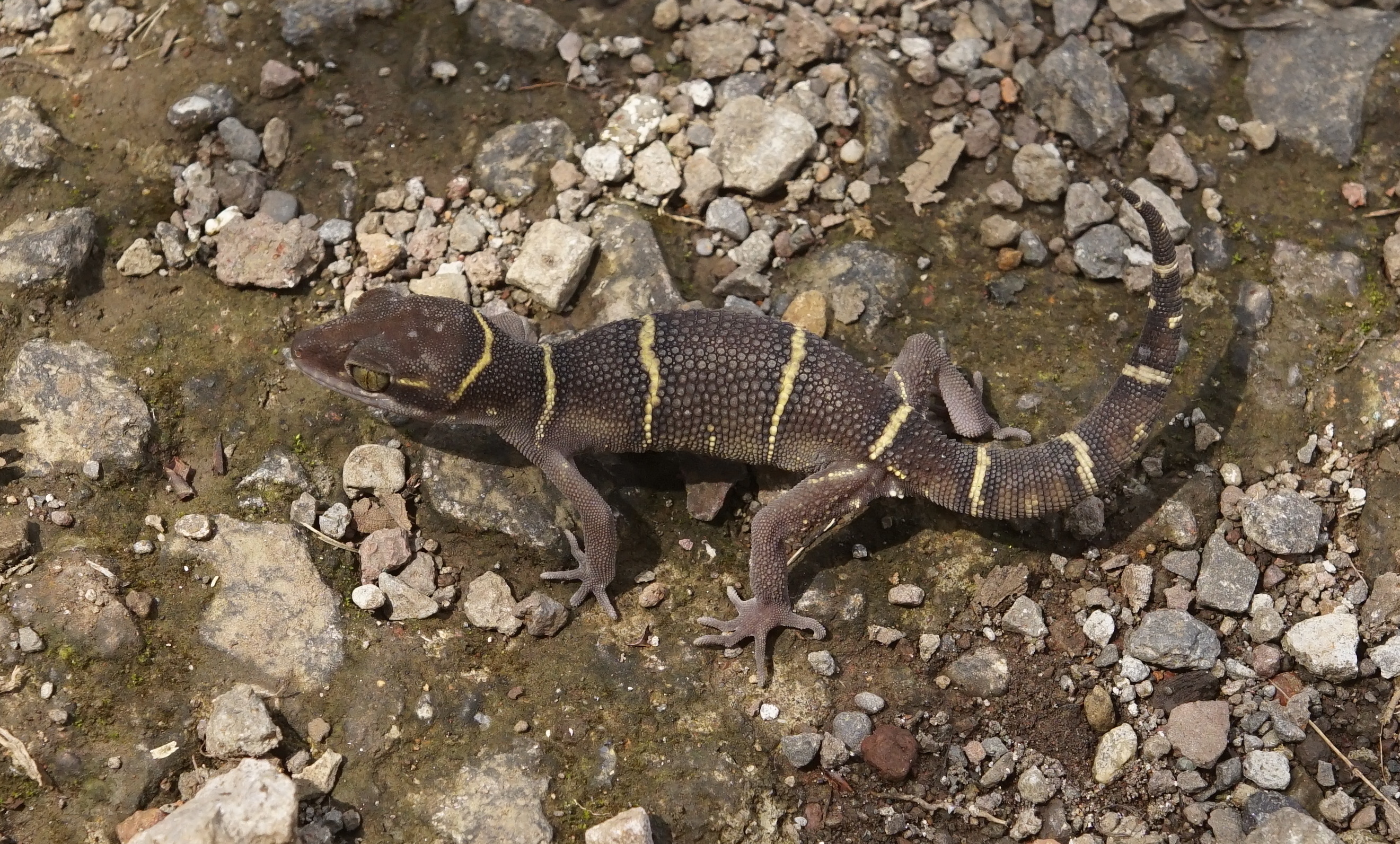
Cyrtodactylus deccanensis

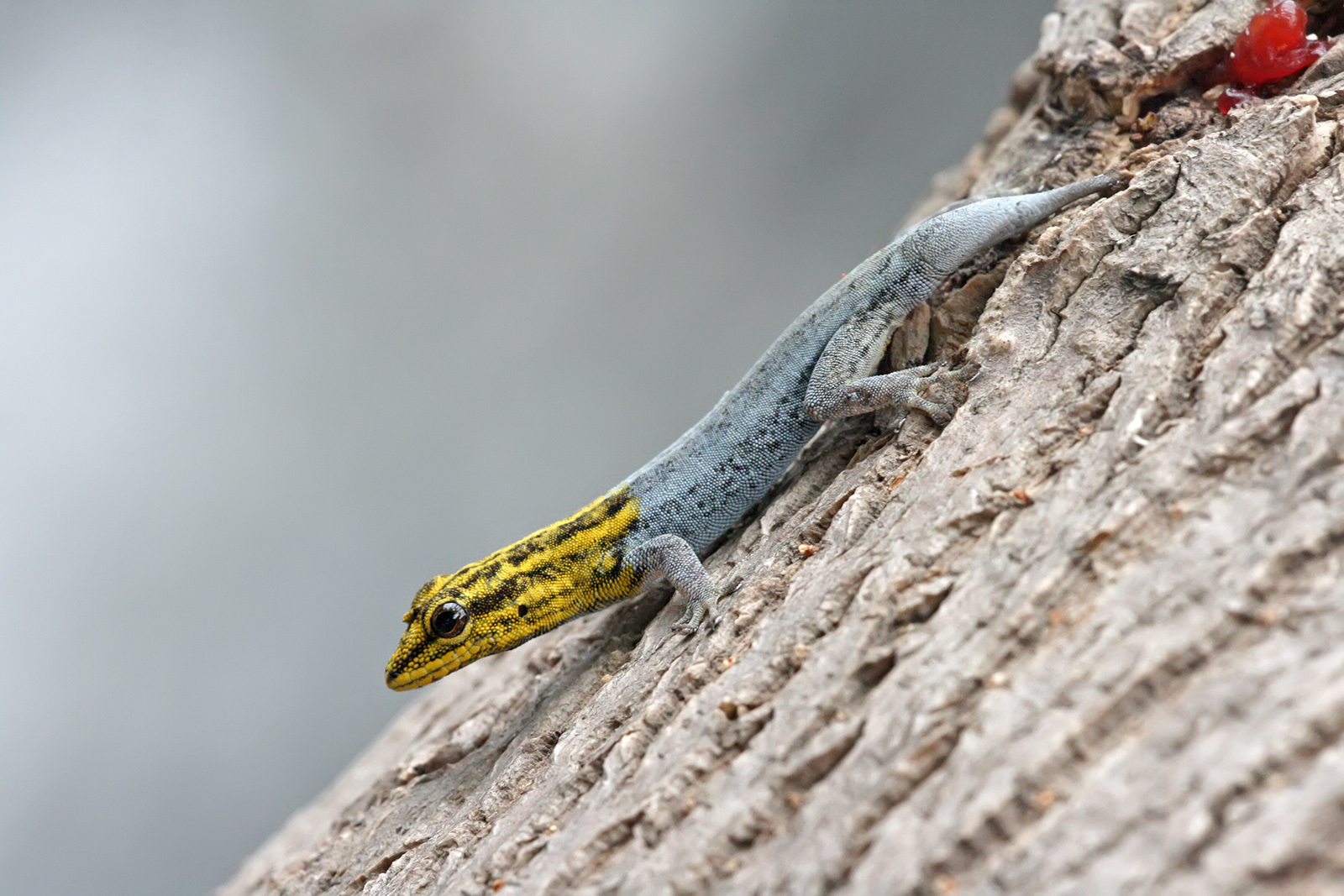
Lygodactylus luteopicturatus(dwarf yellow-headed gecko)

The following is a list of recognized genera:

- Agamura (2 species)
- Alsophylax (6 species)
- Altiphylax (5 species)
- Ancylodactylus (19 species)
- Bunopus (3 species)
- Carinatogecko (2 species)
- Cnemaspis (148 species)
- Crossobamon (1 or 2 species)
- Cryptactites (monotypic)
- Cyrtodactylus (297 species)
- Cyrtopodion (37 species)
- Dixonius (11 species)
- Dravidogecko (7 species)
- Gehyra (68 species)
- Gekko (86 species)
- Gonydactylus (4 species)
- Hemidactylus (190 species)
- Hemiphyllodactylus (51 species)
- Heteronotia (3 species)
- Lepidodactylus (44 species)
- Luperosaurus (8 species)
- Mediodactylus (13 species)
- Nactus (35 species)
- Palmatogecko (2 species)
- Pseudogekko (10 species)
- Rhinogekko (2 species)
- Stenodactylus (10 species)
- Teratolepis (2 species)
- Trachydactylus (2 species)
- Trigonodactylus (3 species)
- Tropiocolotes (15 species)
