= Relict gecko =

Relict Gecko

Scientific classification
- Kingdom: Animalia
- Phylum: Chordata
- Class: Reptilia
- Order: Squamata
- Suborder: Gekkota
- Family: Gekkonidae
- Genus: Cyrtodactylus
- Species: C. relictus

Binomial name
- Cyrtodactylus relictus Agarwal, Thackeray & Khandekar, 2023

Species of gecko

The relict gecko (Cyrtodactylus relictus) is a small gecko from Andhra Pradesh, India. The gecko can grow to about 8.9 cm (3.5 in) in length. It has a tan coloring ranging between a light khaki to a dark brown. The gecko has multiple dark spots on its body.

== Discovery ==
The gecko was found in the district of Nellore, Andhra Pradesh, by a group of Thackeray Foundation students.

== Etymology ==
The gecko's name is derived from the Latin word for "a species that has survived from an earlier period with different environmental conditions". This is because the creature's habitat is a cooler forest, that is surrounded by warm and open areas.
