= Arabian short-fingered gecko =

Conservation status
- Least Concern (IUCN 3.1)

Scientific classification
- Domain: Eukaryota
- Kingdom: Animalia
- Phylum: Chordata
- Class: Reptilia
- Order: Squamata
- Infraorder: Gekkota
- Family: Gekkonidae
- Genus: Trigonodactylus
- Species: T. arabicus

Binomial name
- Trigonodactylus arabicus (Haas, 1957)

Synonyms
- Stenodactylus arabicus Haas, 1957

Species of lizard

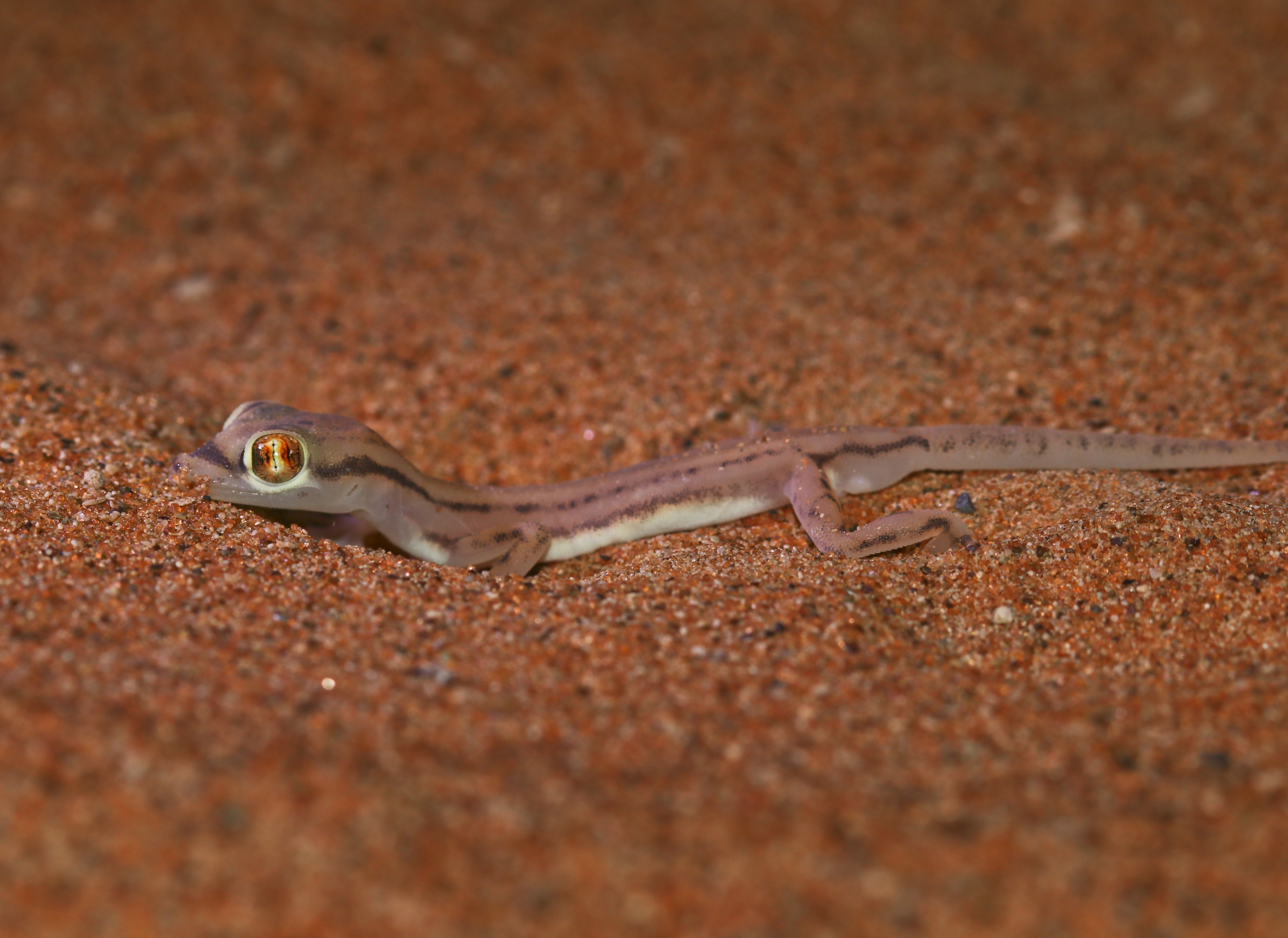
Trigonodactylus arabicus from the desert of United Arab Emirates

The Arabian short-fingered gecko or Arabian sand gecko (Trigonodactylus arabicus) is a gecko of the genus Trigonodactylus.
