= Cyrtodactylus triedrus =

Conservation status
- Near Threatened (IUCN 3.1)

Scientific classification
- Kingdom: Animalia
- Phylum: Chordata
- Class: Reptilia
- Order: Squamata
- Suborder: Gekkota
- Family: Gekkonidae
- Genus: Cyrtodactylus
- Species: C. triedrus

Binomial name
- Cyrtodactylus triedrus (Günther, 1864)
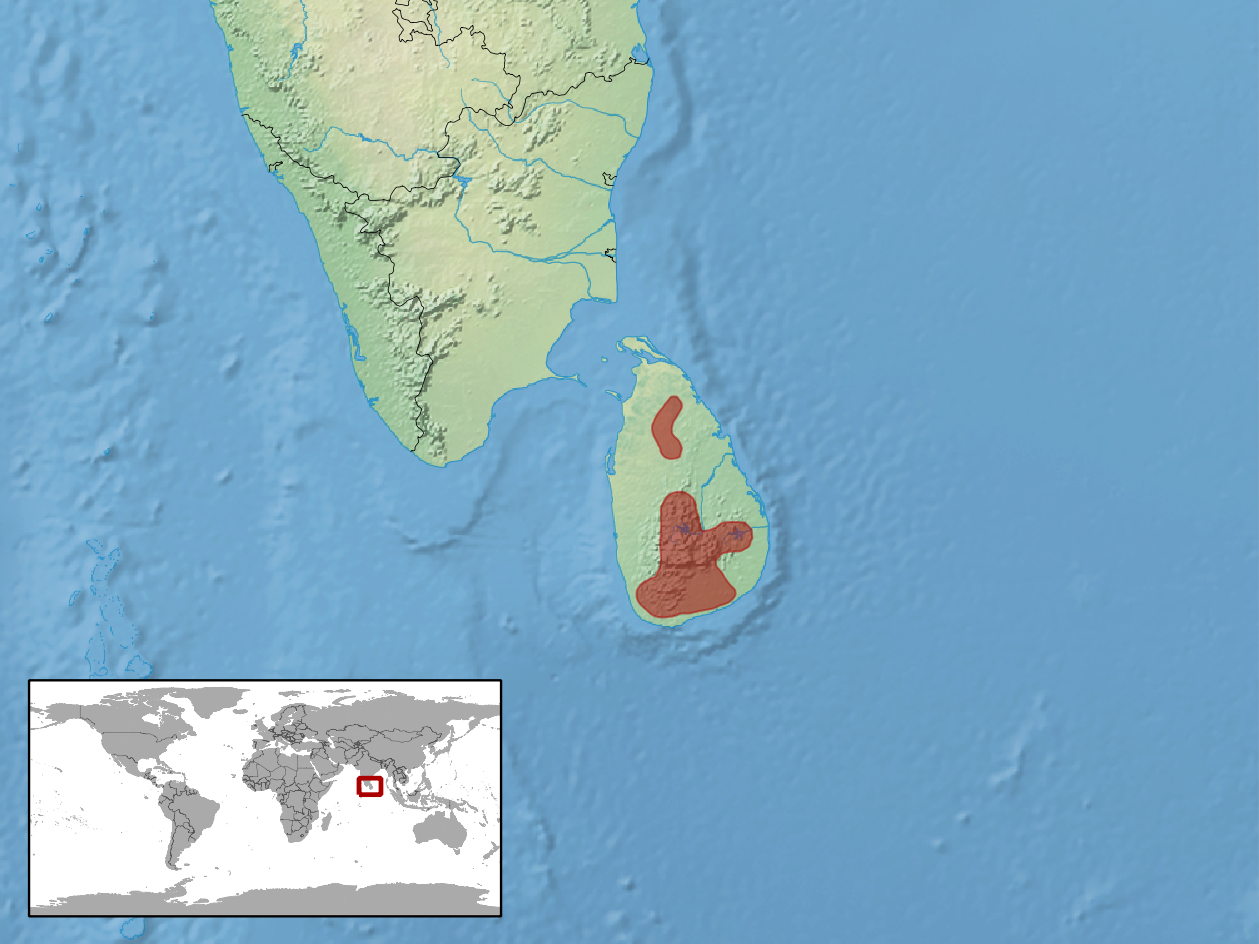

Synonyms
- Geckoella triedrus; Geckoella triedra; Geckoella punctata; Gymnodactylus triedrus

Species of lizard

Cyrtodactylus triedrus, also known as the spotted bent-toed gecko, Sri Lanka gecko, spotted bow-fingered gecko, or spotted ground gecko, is a species of gecko endemic to island of Sri Lanka.

== Habitat and distribution ==
It is a small, dark, turnip-tailed gecko from Sri Lanka's midhills below 700m. Known localities include Peradeniya, Gammaduwa, Kithulgala, and Knuckles Mountain Range.

== Description ==
The body is with small, granular scales, intermixed with larger keeled scales. Midventral scales are cycloid and imbricate, numbering 35. Toes are short. Males have 3-4 pre-anal pores and 3-4 femoral pores. The dorsum is dark brown to nearly black, typically with small white spots that are edged with brown color. Venter is light brown.

== Ecology and diet ==
It is found under and inside decaying fallen logs. It is found inside houses, under piles of wood. Its diet presumably consists small arthropods.

== Reproduction ==
Females typically lay 2 eggs and are produced at a time between the months of April and July. Hatchlings measure 23mm and lack the pale spots on the dorsum.
