= Trachydactylus =

Scientific classification
- Kingdom: Animalia
- Phylum: Chordata
- Class: Reptilia
- Order: Squamata
- Suborder: Gekkota
- Family: Gekkonidae
- Subfamily: Gekkoninae
- Genus: Trachydactylus; Haas & Battersby, 1959

Species
- 2, see text.

Genus of lizards

Trachydactylus, from Ancient Greek τραχύς (trakhús), meaning "rough", and δάκτυλος (dáktulos), meaning "finger", is a genus of geckos from the Middle East.

== Species ==
The genus Trachydactylus contains 2 recognized species.

- Trachydactylus hajarensis (Arnold, 1980)
- Trachydactylus spatalurus Anderson, 1901

Nota bene: A binomial authority in parentheses indicates that the species was originally described in a different genus than Trachydactylus.
