= Cyrtodactylus nebulosus =

Conservation status
- Least Concern (IUCN 3.1)

Scientific classification
- Kingdom: Animalia
- Phylum: Chordata
- Class: Reptilia
- Order: Squamata
- Suborder: Gekkota
- Family: Gekkonidae
- Genus: Cyrtodactylus
- Species: C. nebulosus

Binomial name
- Cyrtodactylus nebulosus (Beddome, 1870)

Synonyms
- Geckoella nebulosus Gymnodactylus nebulosus

Species of lizard

Cyrtodactylus nebulosus, also known as the clouded Indian gecko, is a species of gecko found in India.

== Description ==
Note that the following diagnostic description may include Cyrtodactylus collegalensis following an older taxonomy.

The Cyrtodactylus nebulosus' head is rather large, oviform, generally very convex, sometimes more depressed; snout longer than the diameter of the orbit or the distance between the eye and the ear-opening; forehead slightly concave; ear-opening elliptical, oblique, one third to one half the diameter of the eye. Its body is rather short, not much depressed. Limbs moderate; digits short, thick, slightly depressed at the base, compressed at the end, beneath with enlarged plates. Its head is covered with granules, which are larger on the snout; rostral quadrangular, generally nearly twice as broad as deep; nostril pierced between the rostral, the first labial, and several small scales; 9 to 11 upper and 7 to 9 lower labials; mental triangular; a pair of large chin-shields forming a suture behind the point of the mental, surrounded by several smaller shields. Upper surface of body covered with small granules, which are uniform or intermixed with more or less numerous, irregularly scattered, small roundish keeled tubercles. Abdominal scales small, cycloid, imbricate, smooth. There are no femoral or pre-anal pores. Its tail is cylindrical, tapering, probably prehensile, covered with small imbricate smooth scales, largest below. It's pale and brownish above, variously ornamented with brown spots or cross bands becoming blackish towards their borders and more or less distinctly finely margined with lighter; head marbled or elegantly marked with insuliform brown spots, with a brown band passing through the eye; lower surfaces whitish, the throat reticulated with brown, which reticulation has a tendency to form oblique lines. From snout to vent 2 inches: tail 1.7.

The distribution of this species appears to be Central and eastern India.
