= Eduard Friedrich Eversmann =

Prussian biologist and explorer (1794–1860)

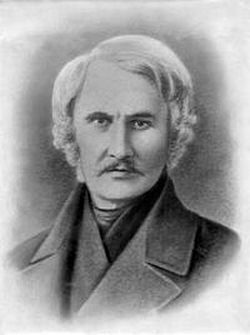
- Born: 23 January 1794; Westphalia
- Died: April 14, 1860 (aged 66)
- Education: University of Marburg; University of Halle; University of Berlin; Imperial University of Dorpat
- Occupations: Biologist; explorer
- Scientific career
- Author abbrev. (botany): Eversm.

Alexander Eduard Friedrich Eversmann (23 January 1794 – 14 April 1860) was a Prussian biologist and explorer.

== Early life and education ==
Eversmann was born in Westphalia on 23 January 1794 and studied at the universities of Marburg, Halle, Berlin and Dorpat. He received his degree of Philosophy and Master of Liberal Sciences at Halle in 1814, and at Dorpat graduated as a Doctor of Medicine and Surgery in 1817. During the next three years, he travelled in the southern Urals, collecting specimens and sending them to Hinrich Lichtenstein at the university of Berlin.

== Career ==
Eversmann had long planned to travel into Central Asia to collect natural history specimens. He had studied the languages, customs, and Muslim religion of the peoples of the area. In 1820, he set off for Bukhara disguised as a merchant, a journey he described in Reise Orenburg nach Buchara (1823), with a natural history appendix by Lichtenstein. In 1825, he travelled with a military expedition to Khiva. He was appointed professor of zoology and botany at the university of Kazan in 1828. During the next thirty years he wrote numerous publications and is considered the pioneer of research into the flora and fauna of the southeast steppes of Russia between the Volga and the Urals.

His name is commemorated in that of a number of birds, such as Eversmann's redstart, butterflies, including Eversmann's parnassian and moths, such as Eversmann's rustic. A Russian entomological magazine is named Eversmannia.

In the scientific field of herpetology he is best known for having described two new species of lizards, Darevskia praticola and Darevskia saxicola. A species of lizard, Crossobamon eversmanni, is named in his honor.

== Works ==
- 1832. "Lepidopterorum species nonnullae novae Gubernium Orenburgense incolentes". Nouvelles Memoires de la Societe imperiela des Naturalistes de Moscou. 2: 347–354, 2 cpls.
- 1841. "Nachricht über einige noch unbekannte Schmetterlinge des ostlichen Russlands" Bull. Soc. imp. Nat. Moscou 14(l): 18–33, 1 cpl.
- Eversmann, Eduard (1847). "Fauna Hymenopterologica Volgo-Uralensis I". Bulletin de la Société impériale des naturalistes de Moscou (in Latin). 20 (1): 3–68. (families Tenthredinidae and Uroceratae)
- 1848. "Beschreibung einiger neuen Falter Russlands". Bull. Soc. imp. Nat. Moscou. 21 (3): 205–232.
- Eversmann, Eduard (1849). "Fauna Hymenopterologica Volgo-Uralensis II". Bulletin de la Société impériale des naturalistes de Moscou (in Latin). 22 (3): 359–436. (family Sphegidae)
- 1851. "Description de quelques nouvelles espèces de Lépidoptères de la Russie". Bull. Soc. imp. Nat. Moscou. 24 (2): 610–644.
- 1854. "Beiträge zur Lepidopterologie Russlands". Bull. Soc. imp. Nat. Moscou. 27 (3): 174–205, 1 pl.
