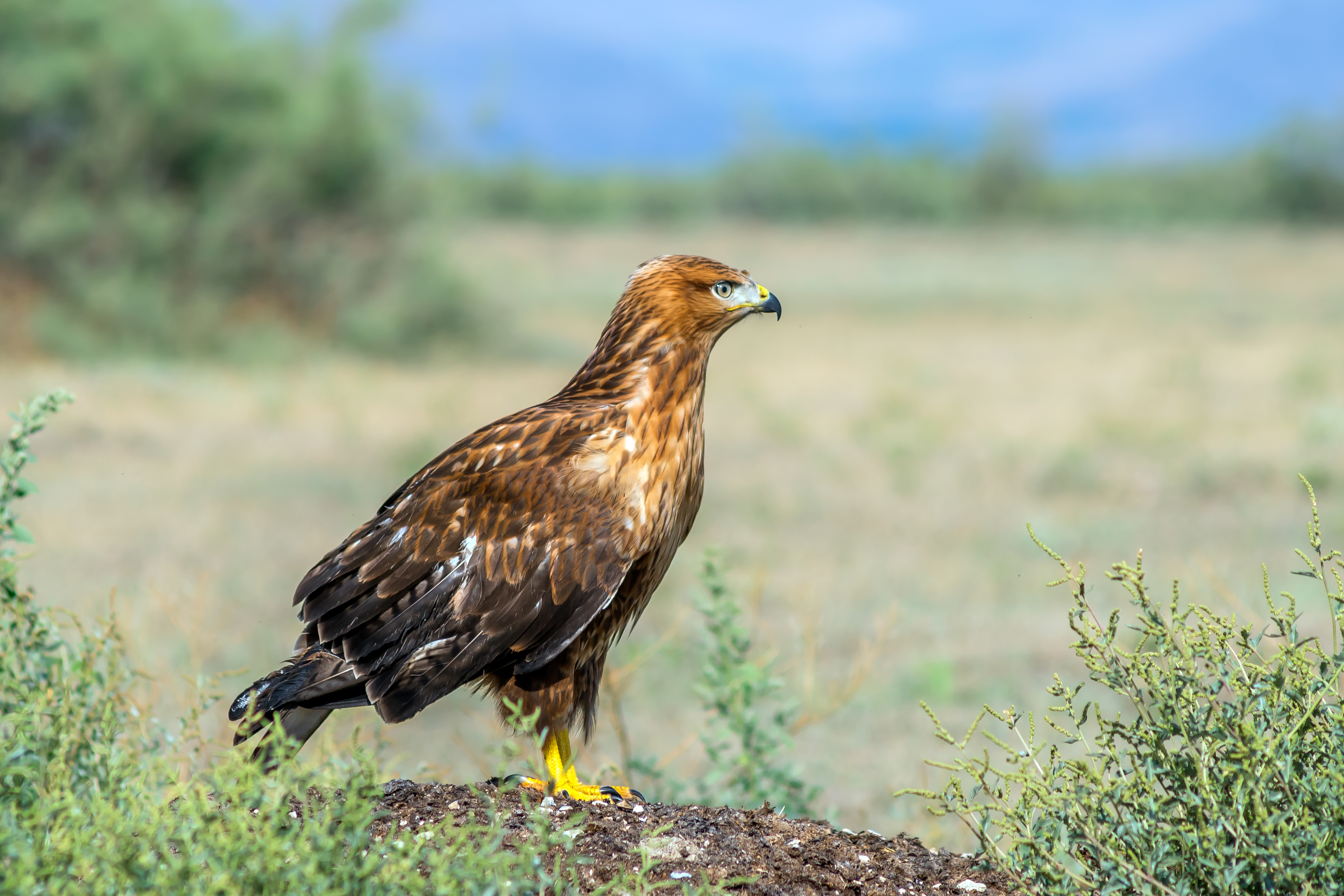
- Nominate B. r. rufinus in Turkey

Conservation status
- Least Concern (IUCN 3.1)

Scientific classification
- Kingdom: Animalia
- Phylum: Chordata
- Class: Aves
- Order: Accipitriformes
- Family: Accipitridae
- Genus: Buteo
- Species: B. rufinus

Binomial name
- Buteo rufinus (Cretzschmar, 1829)

Subspecies
- B. r. rufinus (Cretzschmar, 1829); B. r. cirtensis (Levaillant, J, 1850)
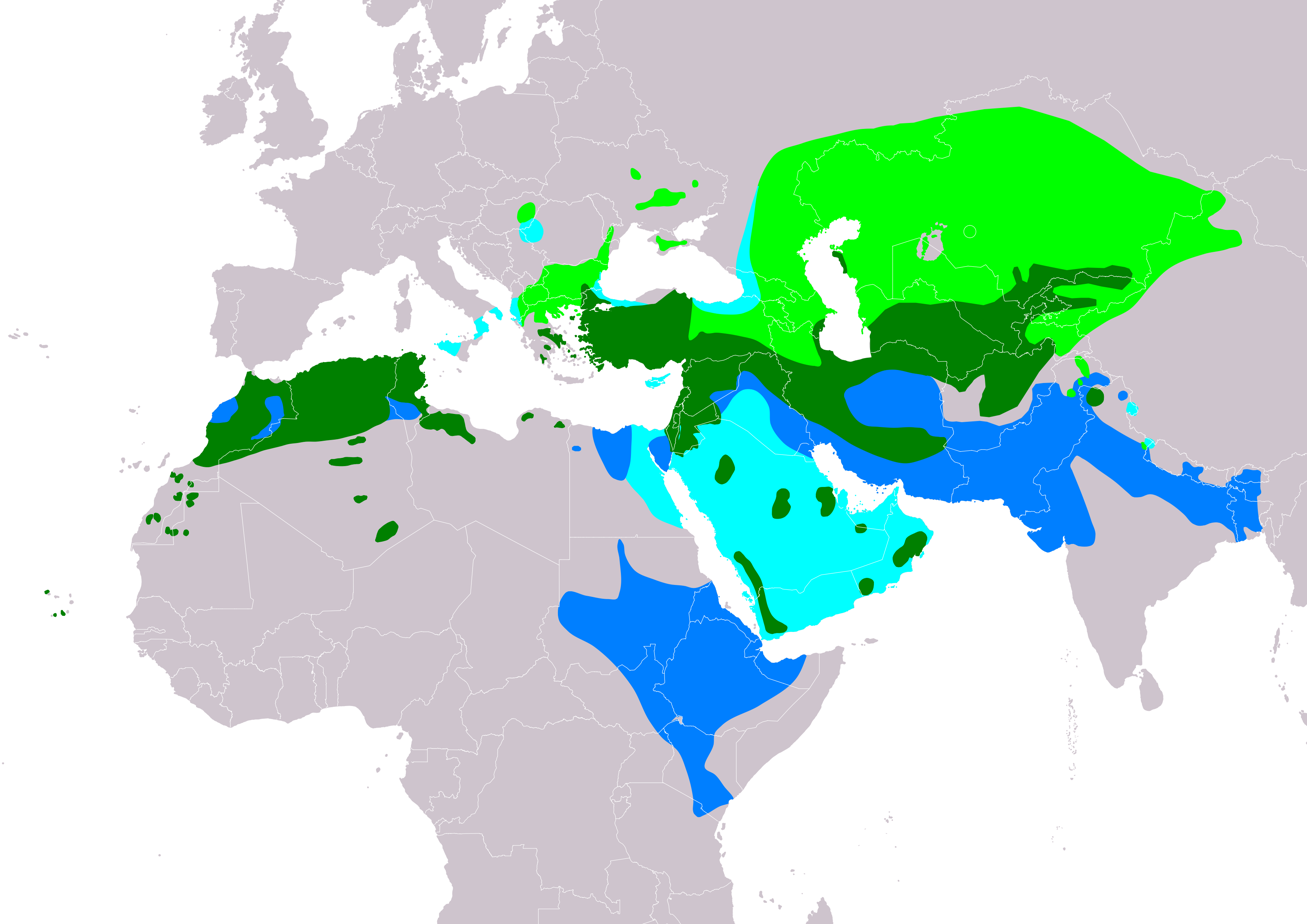
- Range of B. rufinus Breeding summer visitor Breeding resident Passage Winter visitor

Synonyms
- Buteo ferox

= Long-legged buzzard =

Species of bird

The long-legged buzzard (Buteo rufinus) is a bird of prey found widely in several parts of Eurasia and in North Africa. This species ranges from Southeastern Europe down to East Africa to the northern part of the Indian subcontinent. The long-legged buzzard is a member of the genus Buteo, being one of the larger species therein. This species is simultaneously considered relatively powerful and aggressive for its taxonomic group as well as a relatively sluggish raptor overall. Like most buzzards, it prefers small mammals such as rodents, including gerbils, ground squirrels, voles and rats, also taking reptiles, birds and insects as well as carrion. Adaptable to a variety of habitats, long-legged buzzards may nest on a variety of surfaces, including rocks, cliffs and trees. It is a typical buzzard in its reproductive biology. The long-legged buzzard is widely distributed and appears to be quite stable in population. Therefore, it is considered as Least Concern by the IUCN.

== Description ==
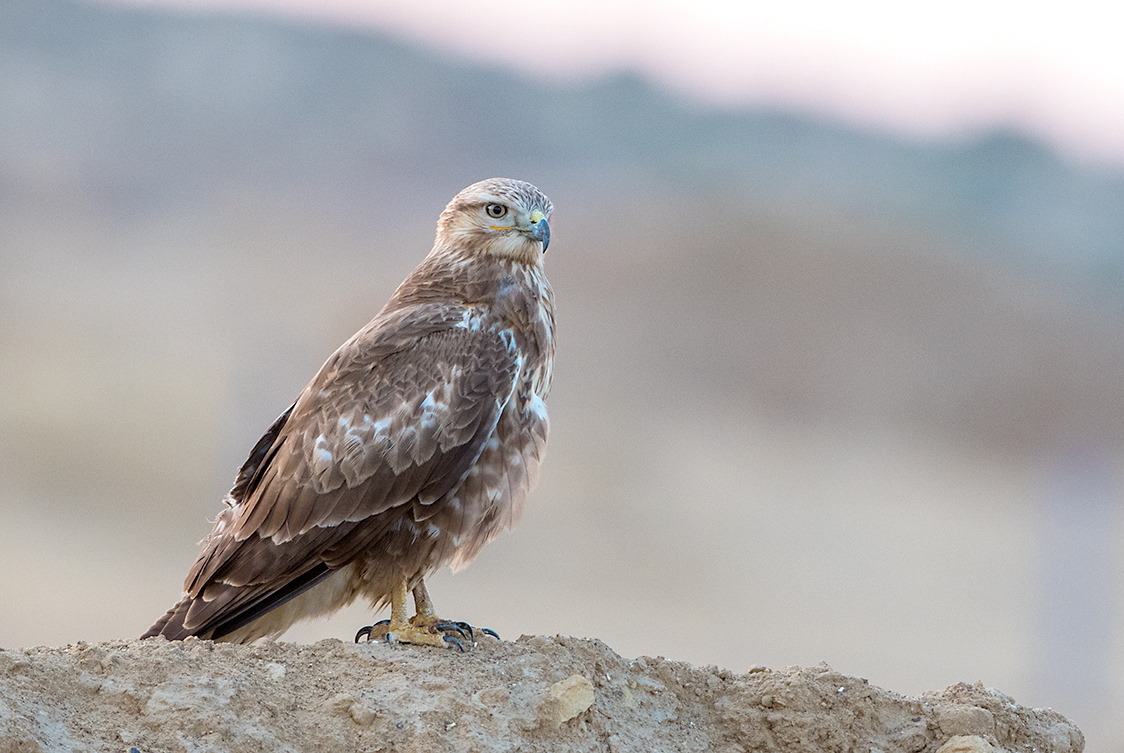
A wintering bird near Jaisalmer in Rajasthan, India

=== Form and colouring ===
This is a large and fairly sturdy Buteo. The long-legged buzzard possesses a relatively large bill on a smallish head, long wings and a rather long tail and relatively long legs with powerful feet. The species tends to be considered sluggish, perching openly and prominently and in rather upright positions on a rock, crag or similar vantage point with a good commanding view; they will also perch regularly on artificial raised points such as pylons or utility poles. The long-legged buzzard also often takes to standing on the ground where it walks slowly, often waddling somewhat. This species is highly variable in plumage, with three to four main morphs. The adult pale morph long-legged buzzard has a rather plain pale head, coloured creamy rufous to light sandy with at most a few darker streaks on the crown and a dark line through an eye, usually with a more solidly dark nape. The pale morph possess dark brown upper parts with sandy buff streaks against a more conspicuous sandy-brown mantle and wing coverts with dark feather-eters causing a contrasting effect. The pale morph adult's tail is light rufous-orange. The paleness of the head in light morphs continues down to breast, the lower part of which having pencil thin streaks, while the belly down to flanks and trousers is a darker rufous-brown. Meanwhile, the intermediate adult are similar to pale adult but with somewhat richer colour, darker and more rufous upperparts and having a slightly darker and more patterned breast. The rufous morph, arguably separate from the intermediate, is more ochracecous overall and a darker rufous on the dark parts of the plumage against the more contrasting pale head. Some rufous adult long-legged buzzards can show a greyish tail with some banding and at times a darker subterminal band. Dark morph adults are all blackish-brown to black with some whitish streaks on nape. The tail of dark morphs are grey to brown-grey with a broad subterminal band and 7 rather narrow and faint bars although many completely lack the latter bars. Juveniles of the pale, intermediate and rufous morphs are similar to the respective adults of their morphs but tend to possess neater, paler edging above, especially on the tips of the greater and median coverts. Also the juveniles are more streaky about the head and breast with tail going from pale whitish darkening outwards to grey-brown with irregular faint brown bars. Dark morph juveniles are less dark than the adult of that morph, sometimes evidencing a small paler patch on breast. The juvenile dark morph long-legged buzzard's tail pattern differs from the dark adult, generally browner than adult with 3 very broad bands and a slightly broader subterminal band but dark morph juvenile tails apparently very variable. Juvenile plumage lasts up to 2–3 years when first breeding occurs. Adults have very dark brown eyes, while the eyes of juveniles are pale grey to greyish yellow turning light brown before darking. The cere and legs are both dull yellow.

In flight, the long-legged buzzards appears as a mid-sized rather broad-bodied raptor. Possessing an almost eagle-like silhouette, it tends to appear with a protruding head with a somewhat heavy bill, long broad wings with fairly straight edges and only slightly tapering hands with rounded five-fingered end. It is relatively long-tailed with the tail having a fairly rounded shape. Juveniles tend to be slimmer looking with narrower wings and more S-shaped trailing edges as well as a somewhat longer tail. Long-legged buzzards tend to fly with comparatively slow, deep beats and to have a relatively slow flight. The species glides with their arms raised and hands more level, wings noticeably kinked at carpals and soars in wide circles with the wings in shallow dihedral. The upward bent tips can enhance their eagle-like appearance. Long-legged buzzards often hover frequently and for extended periods. In the flight, the whitish based orangey tail often looks all white at a distance and to stand out in its paleness against the dark rear body and the rear wings. The primary coverts and many greater coverts are blackish in adult long-legged buzzards with the greater coverts pale tipped. Adults are dark grey on the flight feathers with blackish bars radiating outwards on wingtips and on the trailing edges. The underwing coverts are usually lightly streaked with rufous in pale adults, while intermediate adult has a stronger contrast from pale head and breast to darker, browner upperbody and wing coverts, breast and wing linings. The flying rufous adult tends to look more uniform above with colours varying from ochre to tawny to darker rufous brown and to possess richer coloured darker parts, with the tail very variable in rufous morph. Dark adult in flight may appear with or without a pale nape patch. Dark morph long-legged buzzards above evidence pale bases to primaries, some less dark individuals showing slight contrast of brown-tinged wing coverts against blacker carpal areas with greyish cast to secondaries but tail more obviously pale and greyer and variable. Below dark morph adult striking contrasting from dark body and underwing coverts against pale flight feathers. Juvenile long-legged buzzards are evidently more streaky in pale, intermediate and rufous morphs with differing wing shape. Juveniles of the 3 morphs have comparatively uniform secondaries above with a paler based hand, the inner four primaries being thinly barred, the whitish tail becoming greyer brown and appear indistinctly barred distally. The trailing wing edges are more diffuse, greyer and narrower than on adults with a dark line often evidence along greater coverts. Dark morph juveniles in flight even more uniform above without darker trailing edges above and below greyish secondaries are much duskier-looking with broader but diffuse barring and often markedly wide trailing edges, this increasing the contrast against the dark tipped whitish hand.

=== Size ===
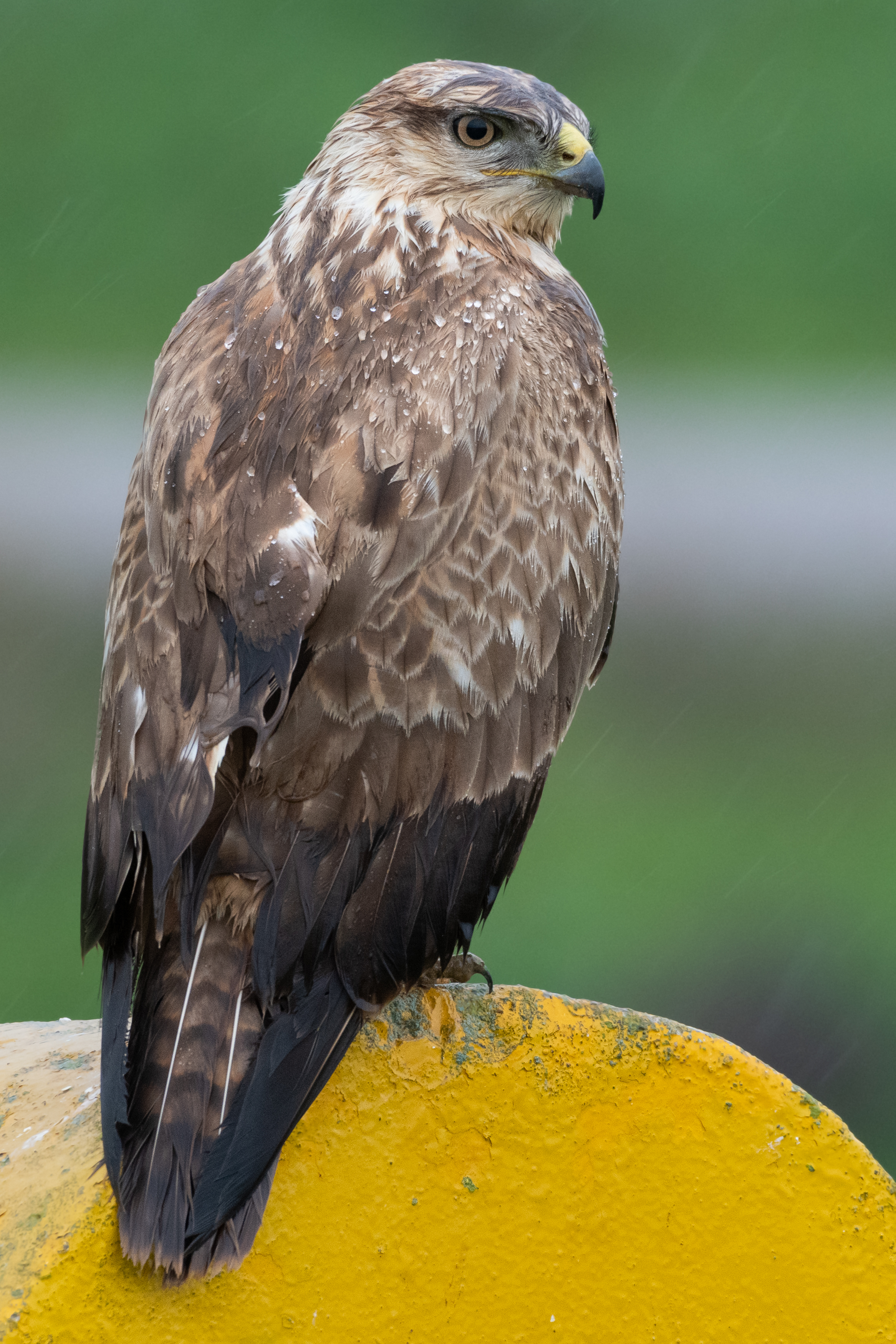
B. r. cirtensis at Ichkeul, Tunisia

This is one of the largest species of the genus Buteo. Only two species, the upland buzzard (Buteo hemilasius) and the ferruginous hawk (Buteo regalis), notably exceed the average and maximum weight of nominate long-legged buzzards or attain similar wingspans, but several other species of the genus broadly overlap in body size with the long-legged buzzard (for instance the Galapagos, rufous-tailed and red-tailed hawks and the Augur, rough-legged and jackal buzzards). Length can range from 50 to 66 cm (20 to 26 in) and wingspan from 112 to 163 cm (3 ft 8 in to 5 ft 4 in). Mean wingspan may be about 145 cm (4 ft 9 in), with wingspans surely rivaling the upland buzzard as the greatest of all Buteo. The long-legged buzzard displays the typical size sexual dimorphism in favour of females, as they may be to 15% larger and can average up to 30% heavier. The mean body weight of males is 1,035 g (2.282 lb), amongst a sample of 8 with weights ranging from 590 to 1,281 g (1.301 to 2.824 lb), while the mean was 1,315 g (2.899 lb) in females, in a sample of 11 ranging from 945 to 1,760 g (2.083 to 3.880 lb). Meanwhile, the weights of migrating long-legged buzzards migrating in Eilat were 1,182 g (2.606 lb) in mature buzzards and 1,047 g (2.308 lb) in second-year juveniles. The measurements of live Indian long-legged buzzards were 1,000 to 1,300 g (2.2 to 2.9 lb) with slighter lengths of 46 to 55 cm (18 to 22 in) and wingspans of 129 to 150 cm (4 ft 3 in to 4 ft 11 in). Among standard measurements, nominate subspecies males attain a wing chord of 405 to 459 mm (15.9 to 18.1 in) while the female attains a wing chord of 428 to 496 mm (16.9 to 19.5 in). In males the tail may measure 204 to 244 mm (8.0 to 9.6 in) while the female may measure 223 to 262 mm (8.8 to 10.3 in). In tarsal length, males may measure 83 to 93 mm (3.3 to 3.7 in) while females attain 87 to 96 mm (3.4 to 3.8 in). In the nominate race, the culmen from the cere is 23.4 to 30 mm (0.92 to 1.18 in) in both sexes, with an average of 27.9 mm (1.10 in) in migrants at Eilat. Mature migrants in Eilat measured from 24.8 to 32.1 mm (0.98 to 1.26 in), averaging 27.8 mm (1.09 in), on the enlarged hallux-claw.

=== Identification ===
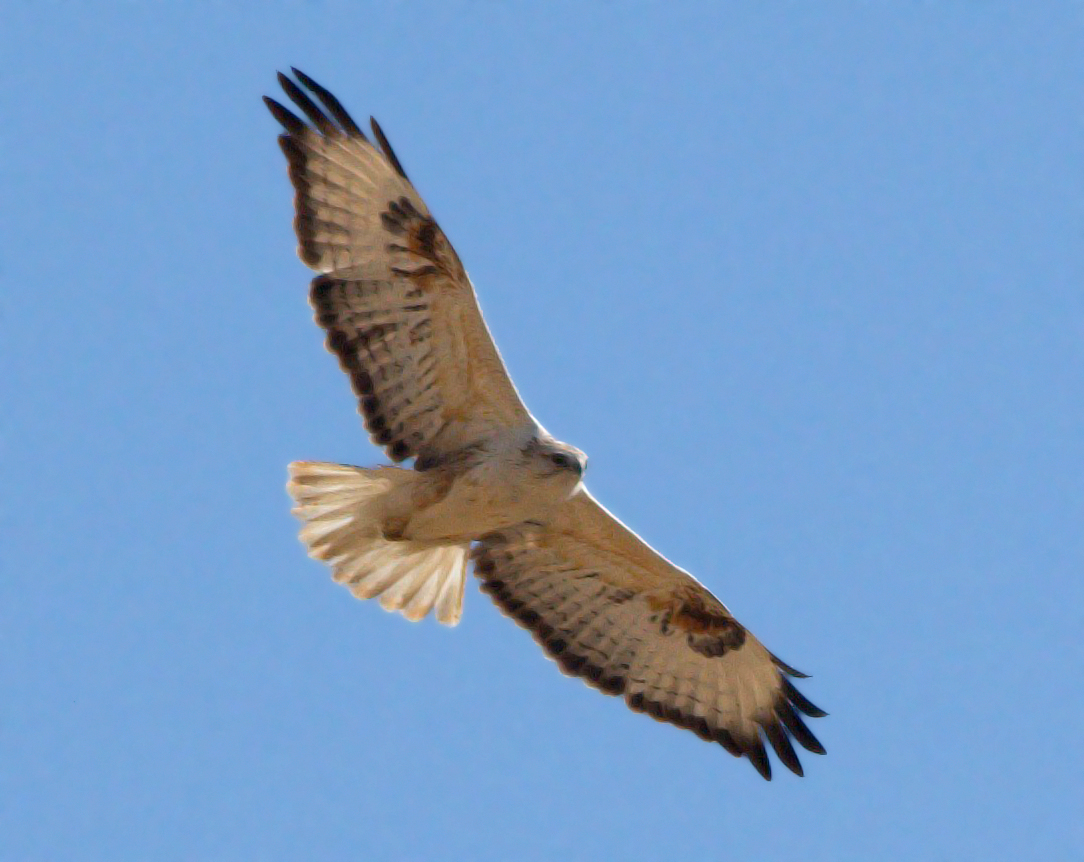
A typical pale long-legged buzzard as seen from below.

Paler individuals of the long-legged buzzard are typically reasonably distinctive but their highly variable plumage leads to mistaken identity. The main confusion is with the even more variable common buzzard (Buteo buteo), principally of the steppe subspecies, which breeds and migrates in often similar areas. Steppe buzzards are told apart by various features of plumage, i.e. darker head and chest with a contrasting paler breast band, fully barred and darker uppertails, less distinct carpal patch both above and below, more contrasting wing lining with median coverts paler, with the greater covert darkest. Due to much variation in plumage, steppe buzzards often not reliably distinguished and in distant sightings best told apart by their smaller size and differing proportions. The steppe buzzard is distinctly smaller, of more compact build and possess a distinctly shorter wings and tail than nominate long-legged buzzards. Furthermore, the steppe buzzard has a more pronounced head but less protruding bill and flies with faster but stiffer and less flexible beats. Furthermore, steppe buzzards tend to fly with flatter wings in a glide and less pronounced dihederal without tips pointed up. Dark morphs of the respective species are so similar that they must be told by size, proportions and flight actions. Especially hard to tell apart from the steppe buzzard is the smaller North African subspecies. In Asia the long-legged buzzard is similar to the upland buzzard, which averages slightly bigger in size but is somewhat narrower winged. Typically the upland species has a large white patch on the hand above, with a uniform looking greyish white tail (with at most 2-3 dark bars only visible at close range), darker, more earthen brown on the breast and thighs and lacks the long-legged's typical warm, rufous tones. In dark morph upland buzzards, though they may manifest some darker ground colour on under secondaries and sometimes show pale U on breast but otherwise almost identical in appearance to dark morph long-legged buzzards. The only other Buteo that can be potentially confused with the long-legged buzzard is the migrant rough-legged buzzard (Buteo lagopus) which is similar in size, proportions and flight behaviour, extending to hovering (however the rough-legged is marginally smaller in size with shorter legs and a shorter bill). The rough-legged buzzard should be told apart from the long-legged by having a distinctive white based tail with a broad dark subterminal band as well as fully feathered legs, Juvenile rough-legged buzzards lack the dark underwing diagonals of many juvenile long-legged buzzards. The long-legged buzzard is potentially confusable with other medium or large unrelated species of raptor from outside of the Buteo, including multiple species of small to mid-sized eagle and two species of honey buzzard. However, all of these usually tend to have a number of distinctive morphological, especially the proportion and shapes of their wings, head and tail and flight actions, as well as plumage features that tend to easily separate them from even the most similarly hued and sized of long-legged buzzards.

=== Voice ===
The long-legged buzzard's voice is not well studied nor is it believed to be particularly vocal. The species is known to sometimes calls on display but it is less vocal than common buzzard. The call is similar to the latter species but the notes are shorter and slightly higher. The long-legged buzzard's commonest call is a short mew. It is also sometimes transcribed as a kyaaah and drops in pitch at the end of the brief 0.5-0.8 second call. It is said that compared to the common buzzard, the calls of the long-legged buzzard are "less squealing" and more "gull-like". A long-legged buzzard leaving its nest in Morocco just after sunrise was said to have uttered a repeated ar note, shorter fuller and apparently lower than the comparable call of a common buzzard.

== Distribution and habitat ==
The long-legged buzzard inhabits arid areas of northern Africa, southeastern Europe, west and central Asia east to China, and down to as far as central India. The farthermost western part of their breeding range is in west Africa, in Western Sahara, extreme northern Mauritania, much of Morocco west to northern Algeria (spottily elsewhere in the nation), Tunisia and northern Libya (mainly northwestern parts). Long-legged buzzards occur accidentally in several other parts of Africa. In mainland Europe, they mainly nest in the southeastern region. Nesting long-legged buzzards have been known in eastern Hungary, central and eastern Ukraine, southern Moldova, southern and far eastern Romania, southern Serbia and more broadly in Bulgaria and somewhat so in northern Greece. Recent sightings indicate that there is a small population in the Apulian region of south-eastern Italy. Similarly, increasing records of long-legged buzzards are known in far southern Spain with the first nesting occurring in Gibraltar in 2009. The recent colonisation Europe due to the climate in southern Europe becoming more suitable for this species. Vagrant long-legged buzzards have been documented in many parts of Europe, including Finland, Denmark, the Netherlands, France, Poland, Czech Republic, Slovakia, and one record in Shetland in Great Britain on 1 September 2019. Out of Europe in the eastern Mediterranean or Asia Minor, the long-legged buzzard is one of the most continuously found and abundant breeding resident raptors, being distributed throughout all of Turkey, Cyprus, Armenia, Georgia and Azerbaijan. The range continues into southwestern Russia up to about Saratov and Orenburg.

It is also widely and regularly distributed through much of the Middle East, residing almost throughout Syria, Lebanon, Israel, as well as the northern central parts of both Iraq and Iran. More uncommonly the breeding ranges extends into Oman, the United Arab Emirates, Yemen and Saudi Arabia. The range continues almost throughout Central Asia, residing in essentially all of Turkmenistan (including broadly along the Caspian Sea coast), Uzbekistan, all but the northern stretches of Kazakhstan, Tajikistan, Kyrgyzstan and northern and central Afghanistan. The breeding range discontinues in Northwestern China but isolated breeding was documented in the Kashmir region, perhaps straddling both Pakistan and India. During times of passage, long-legged buzzards have been seen more broadly in areas such as the Arabian Peninsula, southern Iraq, western China and northeast Africa, with those that breed in Europe, Russia and Central Asia often departing their breeding grounds for the winter. The wintering areas of migrating long-legged buzzards extend through much of lower Central Asia and the Indian subcontinent including southern Afghanistan, much of Pakistan and northern India through to Nepal, Bhutan and Bangladesh. Vagrants have been recorded to as south as Sri Lanka, northern Burma and the Andaman Islands. Less consistent wintering populations may live from central Sudan and Eritrea, northern South Sudan, much of Ethiopia, into far northeastern Uganda and central Kenya, seldom into far northern Tanzania.

=== Habitat ===
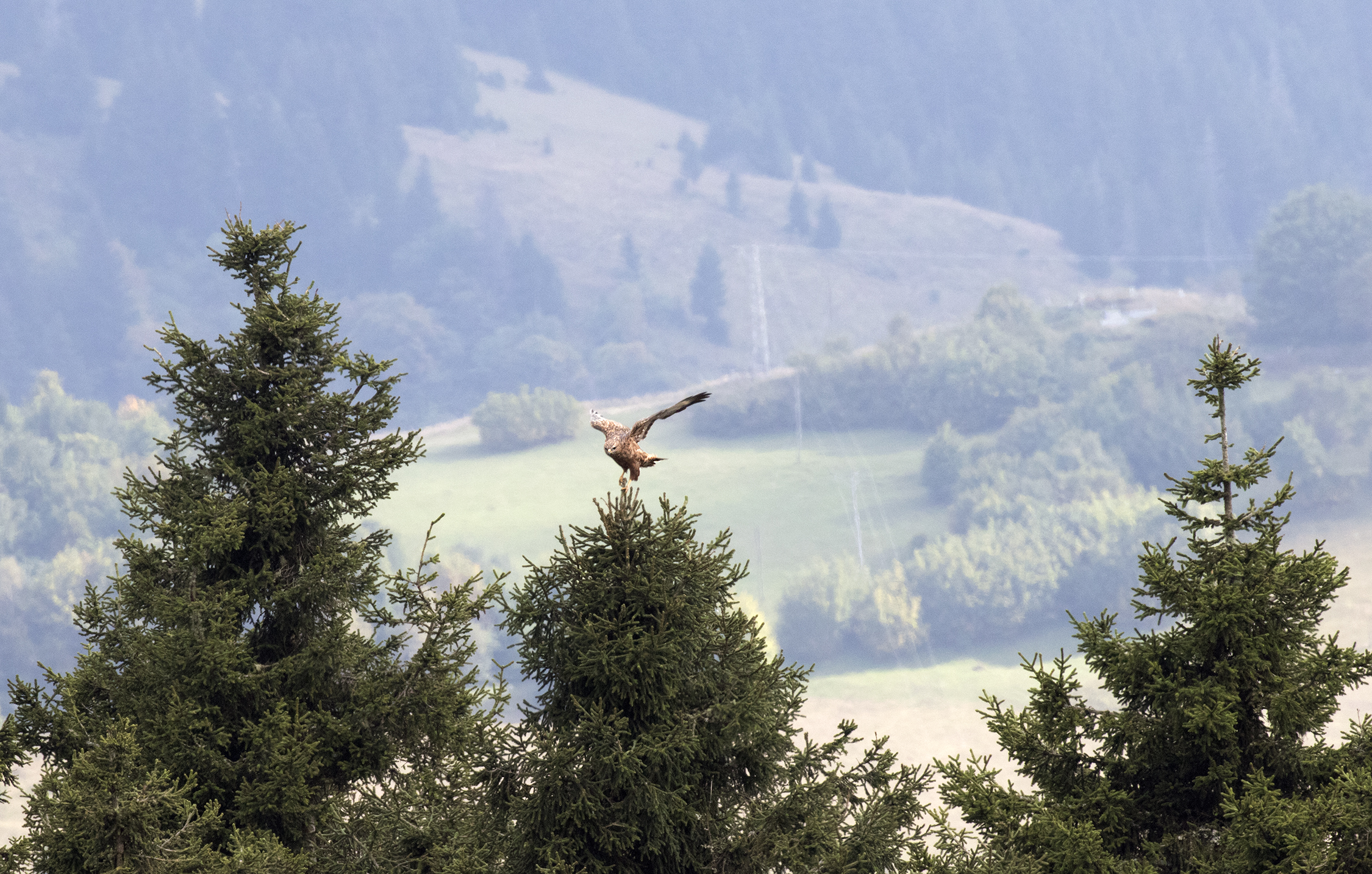
A long-legged buzzard perching in a spruce in Turkey.

The long-legged buzzard inhabits open, uncultivated areas, with high bushes, trees, cliffs or hillocks are favoured as nesting areas as well as access to freshwater. The species normally lives in steppe, semi-desert and desert edge, barren rocky landscapes, dry shrubland and sometimes sea coasts. More irregularly, the species will adapt to woodland as long as plentiful openings are available. As a whole slightly hilly plains are ideal nesting areas. In a study in Iran, 41% of long-legged buzzards were on open plains with low vegetation, 29% on plains with somewhat taller vegetation, 12% were in mountain areas and 18% were in cultivated lands. While long-legged buzzards predominantly forage in wildlands, they are also adaptable to cultivations, pastures, village outskirts and sometimes even heavily farmed areas. Grasslands are widely used during winter. Those wintering in the Indian subcontinent largely use similar arid open plains, semi-deserts and cultivated areas but perhaps surprisingly are considered a characteristic wintering raptor of dry mixed forests with open glades and barren hill slopes. In the Indian subcontinent, the species may often be seen using a variety of perches including bushes, hedges, Acacia nilotica, sand dunes, haystacks, mounds and power poles. The North African and Arabian race may reportedly show a strong preference for open wooded and/or rocky areas but has been reported in a similarly broad amount of habitats as the nominate subspecies. The species may occur from sea-level up to about 1,600 m (5,200 ft) in Europe, but in Asia uncommonly lives in mountains at altitudes of up to 3,000 m (9,800 ft) or even 3,900 m (12,800 ft) with migrants recorded to 5,000 m (16,000 ft). Younger birds disperse north of breeding grounds and there are records from Northern Europe. The breeding population in Greece is around 60 pairs. Reforestation in the Judean Hills in Israel and the West Bank is increasing potential interspecific conflict for other raptors in the vicinity.

== Taxonomy and systematics ==
The long-legged buzzard is a member of the subfamily Buteoninae, which originated in the Americas. The genus Buteo, with nearly 30 species (one of the most diverse genera of diurnal raptors), radiated through Eurasia and Africa, relatively recently in the subfamily's evolutionary history. The most similar extant species and once thought both of as conspecific and to be part of a superspecies is the upland buzzard. However, a genetic study indicated that the long-legged and upland buzzards do not bear a strong genetic relation and the species are by and large allopatric. The upland buzzard abuts the range of long-legged buzzards from Tarbagatay to northwestern Mongolia south to Dzungaria. Evidence has been found of extensive hybridisation between the two species. Although the common buzzard is not considered closely related either, hybridisation has also been recently appearing between long-legged buzzards and common buzzards in Gibraltar, as well as in the Great Hungarian Plains. Additionally, little-known buzzards (once thought to be part of the common buzzard) living on the respective islands of Socotra and Cape Verde have been found to be more closely related to the long-legged buzzard if not necessarily conspecific.

=== Subspecies ===
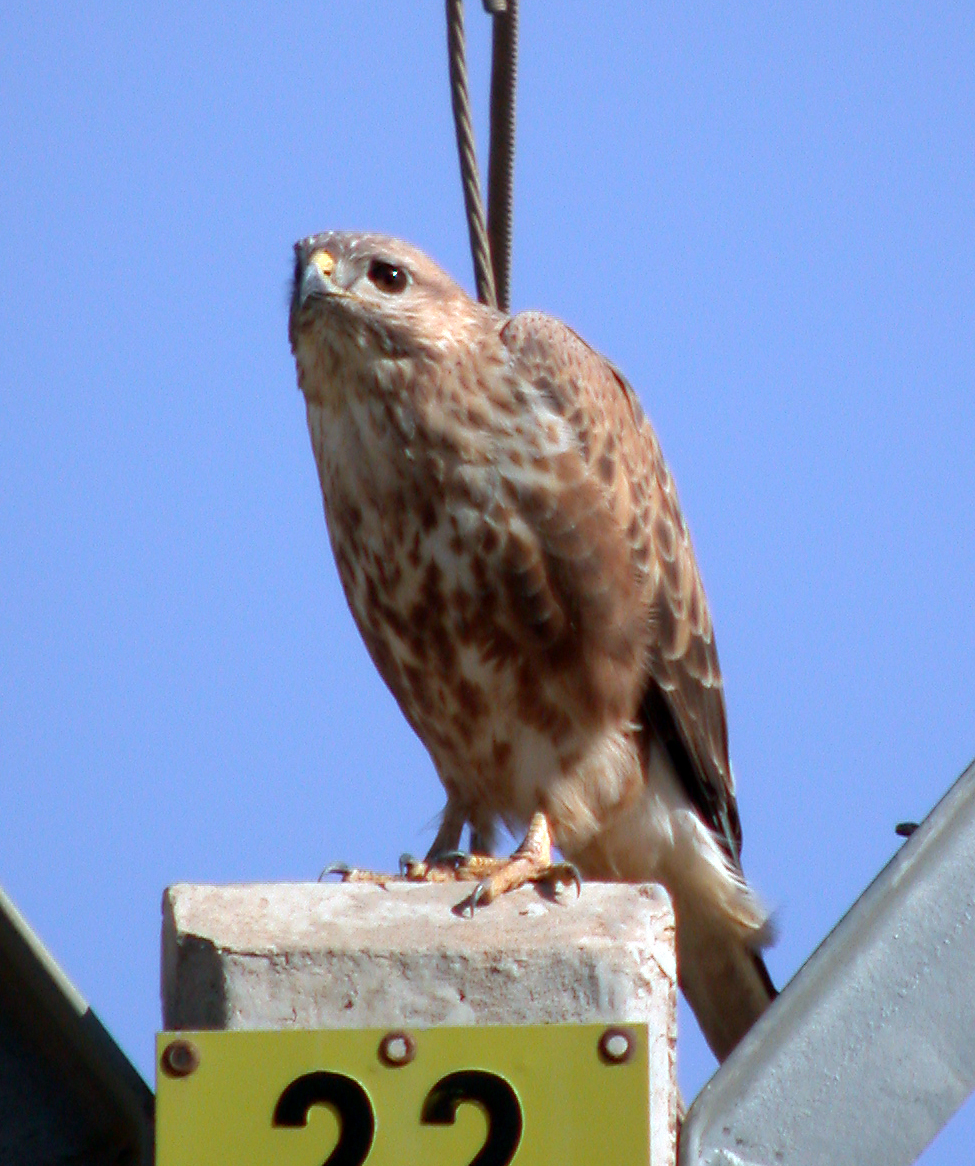
A long-legged buzzard of the smaller North African subspecies, B. r. cirtensis.

Two subspecies are currently recognised:

- Buteo rufinus rufinus: With the exceptional of Arabia and perhaps the southern Middle East, the nominate race comprises all Eurasian breeding long-legged buzzards, being distributed from The Balkans east to Mongolia and India; winters in several areas of South Asia and Africa. All prior descriptions primarily refer to the nominate subspecies
- Buteo rufinus cirtensis: Northern Africa from Mauritania east to Egypt and the Arabian Peninsula, with some evidence that they can reach far southern Israel and the subspecies additionally penetrated Europe in the Gibraltar area. It has been long suggested that this may be a distinct species but extreme variations of both races and minimal differences in behaviour, voice and morphology have prevented said species recognition. Unlike some populations of B. r. rufinus, this subspecies is entirely residential and is not known to migrate. This subspecies tends to be notably smaller than the nominate long-legged buzzard, however evidence indicates that B. r. cirtensis breeding in Arabia and perhaps southern Israel may be larger than the African birds of the races. Wing chord of this race measures 343 to 394 mm (13.5 to 15.5 in) in males and 380 to 425 mm (15.0 to 16.7 in) in females. Additionally, tail length measures 188 to 197 mm (7.4 to 7.8 in) in males and 196 to 201 mm (7.7 to 7.9 in) in females while tarsus length is 72 to 79 mm (2.8 to 3.1 in) in both sexes. One B. r. cirtensis in Israel weighed 865 g (1.907 lb). Furthermore B. r. cirtensis tends to be paler overall than nominate long-legged buzzards, with a somewhat more strongly contrasting rufous belly. It is said that this race lacks a dark morph despite some confusion on the issue.

The taxonomic position of cirtensis remains unsettled; some genetic data suggest that it is more closely related to Buteo buteo than it is to Buteo rufinus rufinus, and should be reclassified as Buteo buteo cirtensis. This reclassification has been accepted by the Ornithological Society of the Middle East, and the Collins Bird Guide, but not by the IOC World Bird List or the Avilist.

== Migration ==
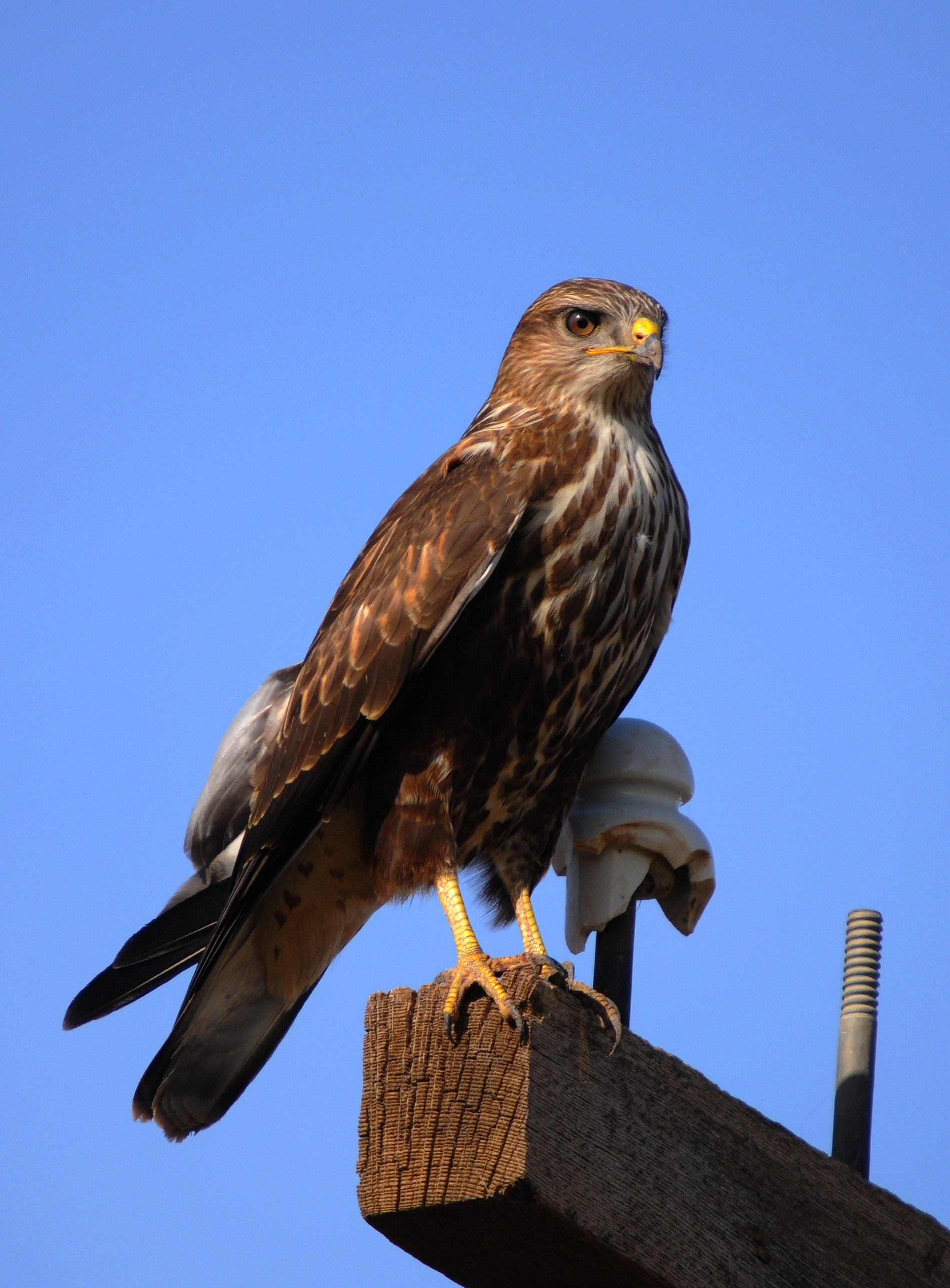
A long-legged buzzard perched on a utility pole.

While the North African race is largely sedentary some short-range dispersal, wandering occasionally to Iberia, while one moved to Senegal in October, rarely southward movements occur, such as to Burkina Faso and Lagos. The nominate race more or less residential in the southern part of the breeding range but almost wholly migratory in north and east of range. Autumn migration commences any time from late August to throughout September. Data from intermediate areas such as Lebanon indicates that autumn passage can extend occasionally into November. Unlike common buzzards, long-legged buzzards tend to migrate singly or in small flocks. Quite small numbers tend to be recorded at main migratory hawk-watches. For example, 1,816 at Suez from September to early November in 1981. In the south Red Sea coast at Bab-el-Mandeb the total number of long-legged buzzards is up to around 130 each autumn. The species normally reaches the Indian subcontinent by about September or October and leaves by about March. Corresponding arrival and departure dates as in the Indian subcontinent were documented for wintering long-legged buzzards in Korea. A majority of the species winter in the eastern Mediterranean, i.e. Greece, Asia Minor through Middle East and Arabia to southern Tibet and northern India, as well as elsewhere in Asia. Central Asian areas may show a mixture of migratory populations, staging grounds and some wintering buzzards. Moderate numbers of long-legged buzzards tend to be documented in Africa, mostly in the Nile Valley in Sudan and the species seldom ranges south of the Sahara but migrants have been documented in both west Africa and east Africa as vagrants. Spring returns flights occur from late February on for about a month and a half, peaking in the 2nd half of March with even fewer typically seen at major migratory sites than in the fall. For example, only about 105 are recorded throughout an average spring in Eilat. Breeding usually already commenced by March-mid April to May, even for birds breeding in the northerly part of the range.

== Dietary biology ==
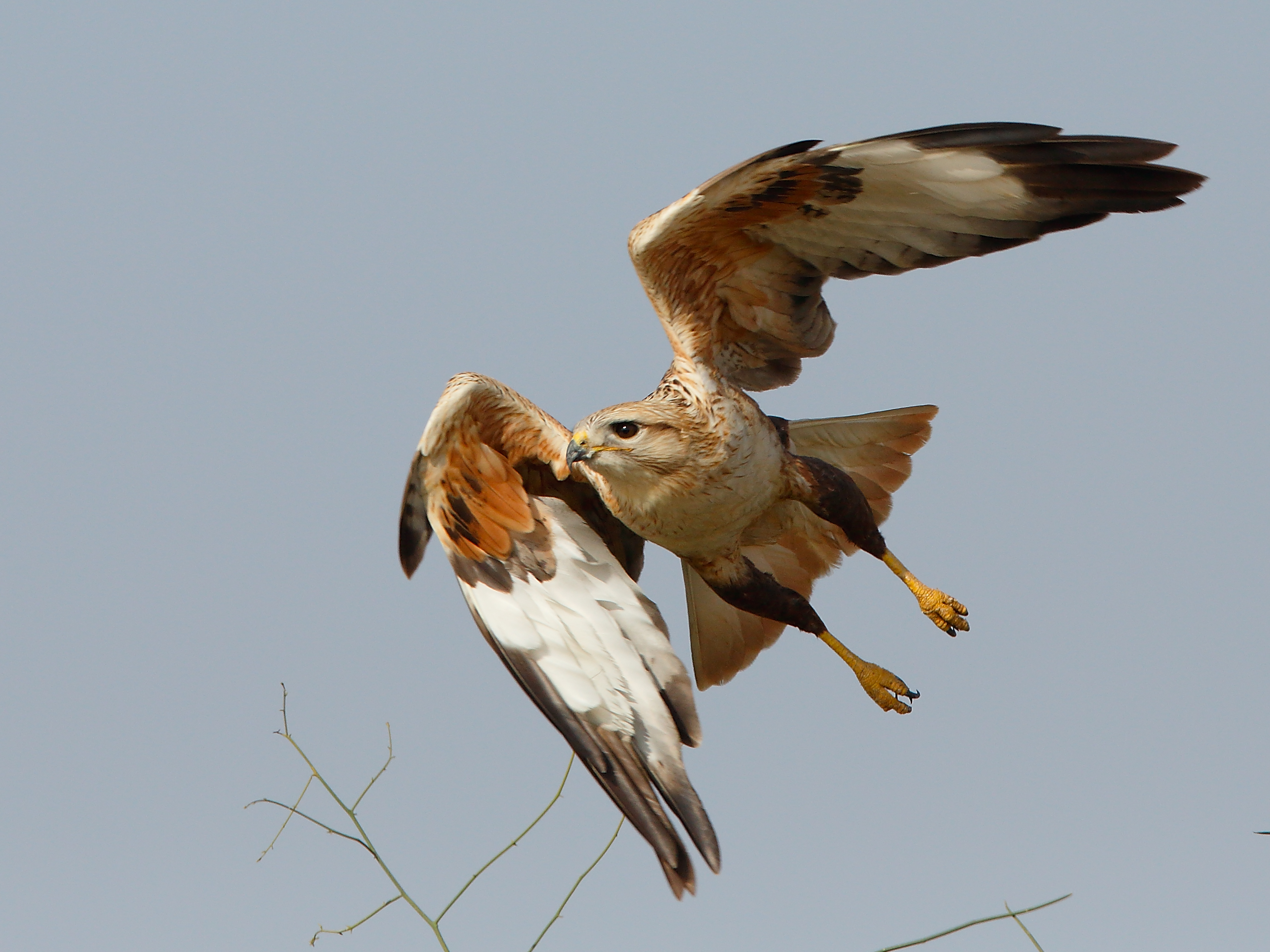
A long-legged buzzard taking flight.

Although frequently described as sluggish, the long-legged buzzard appears by most accounts to be a fairly active and powerful predator. This species often hunts by pounces on unwary prey from a variety of lookout perches. Long-legged buzzards, like many Buteo, regularly still-hunt, using tallish or high perch sites or mounds, spending long periods of time scanning the ground. Regular perch sites while hunting may include power poles, pylons, powerlines, boulders, rocky outcrops and dead and sometimes live trees. They also will watch for prey whilst standing on the ground, sometimes right by the entrance of a prey's burrow. No less often, they may hunt on the wing from hovering or active flight. During hunting on the wing they often hang in the air, at up to about 30 m (100 ft) above the ground, for sometimes several minutes, before dropping steepwise and making a short stoop. It is likely that the habitat being used and dictating availability of perches or sloping land from which to watch the ground dictate the variations in hunting modes seen in this species. Often the preferred hunting habitat is fairly open including upland steppe, arid semi-desert and cultivated fields. Occasionally they have been recorded in small towns as engaging in "stampeding" of feral pigeons resting on ledges, crevices and under the eaves of old buildings by suddenly flying up using the cover of the buildings and catching them as they rise. Long-legged buzzards are known to visit jungle or grass fires in order to capture displaced prey, often engaging in this along with other raptors. The long-legged buzzard has a fairly typical diet for a Buteo, having a generalist opportunistic diet overall, but with a preference for small mammal prey. Somewhat more so than many Buteo species, long-legged buzzards tends to take a great number of reptiles as prey, from fairly small to quite large sizes as well. More secondary prey types include birds, insects, other invertebrates and very rarely other types of vertebrates. The dietary biology of the long-legged buzzard is rather less well-documented than that of common buzzard, even in the European portion of their range, still nearly 200 prey species have been described for it. Staple prey, i.e. vertebrates, for long-legged buzzards taken generally fall in body weight between 20 g (0.71 oz) and 1,500 g (3.3 lb). Scavenging for carrion is not uncommon in long-legged buzzards, having been reported extensively on dog (Canis lupus familaris) carcasses in Romania, however carrion seems to be only regularly ingested during the non-breeding season.

In one of the westernmost dietary studies, in Ukraine, 450 mammalian prey remains found, with 565 total prey items (5.3% birds, 8.3% reptiles, 0.2% amphibians and 6.5% beetles). Main prey here were common vole (Microtus arvalis), averaging an estimated 25 g (0.88 oz) and constituting 48.4% of the diet by number and 12.59% of the biomass and the greater mole-rat (Spalax microphthalmus) and Podolsk mole-rat (Spalax zemni), both averaging an estimated 215 g (7.6 oz) and collectively comprising 22% of the diet by number and 49.2% of the biomass. Other important prey were speckled ground squirrels (Spermophilus suslicus) with the larger mammalian prey being very young European hare (Lepus europaeus) at 500 g (1.1 lb) and adult European hamsters (Cricetus cricetus) at 443 g (15.6 oz), on average. Different Ukrainian study found a predominance of greater mole-rats in the diet, with these constituting 44.5% of the diet by number, rodents altogether making up 77.5% of the foods. Meanwhile, the diet in this second Ukrainian study showed an unusual profusion of bird prey, making up 22.3%. The diet in the Hungarian Hortobágy Plains were found surprisingly among 94 prey items that 69.1% of the diet was beetles, with the European ground squirrel (Spermophilus citellus) most frequent mammal at 19.1%. Elsewhere in Hungary, European ground squirrels were dominant in the diet in Dobruja while outside in Slovakia's Eastern Slovak Flat, the diet almost entirely based upon common vole but only reportedly when the voles were at the peak of their population cycle. Further study on the Great Hungarian Plains seems to reinforce the importance as elsewhere in eastern Europe of common voles and European hamsters in the diet of long-legged buzzards. In southeastern Bulgaria, among 189 prey items, Microtus species made up 22.2% of the diet, European ground squirrels were at 18.6%, brown rat (Rattus norvegicus) at 10.6%, European water vole (Arvicola terrestris) at 8.5% and Balkan green lizard (Lacerta trilineata) at 4.76%. In Bulgaria, 68.8% of the diet was mammalian, 13.23% reptilian, 9% avian, 7.41% arthropods and other vertebrates the remaining balance, with prey varying in size from invertebrates weighing a fraction of a gram to mammals of up to 1.5 kg (3.3 lb) such as young European hare and non-native muskrats (Ondatra zibethicus). Long-legged buzzards in northeastern Greece were found to be highly reliant on the European ground squirrel which comprised 21.2% of 268 prey items there. Most other prey were largely unidentified but included Orthoptera (10.8%) Scolopendra species (10.8%), snake sp. (8.2%), Lacerta sp. (7.83%) and common voles (7.46%).

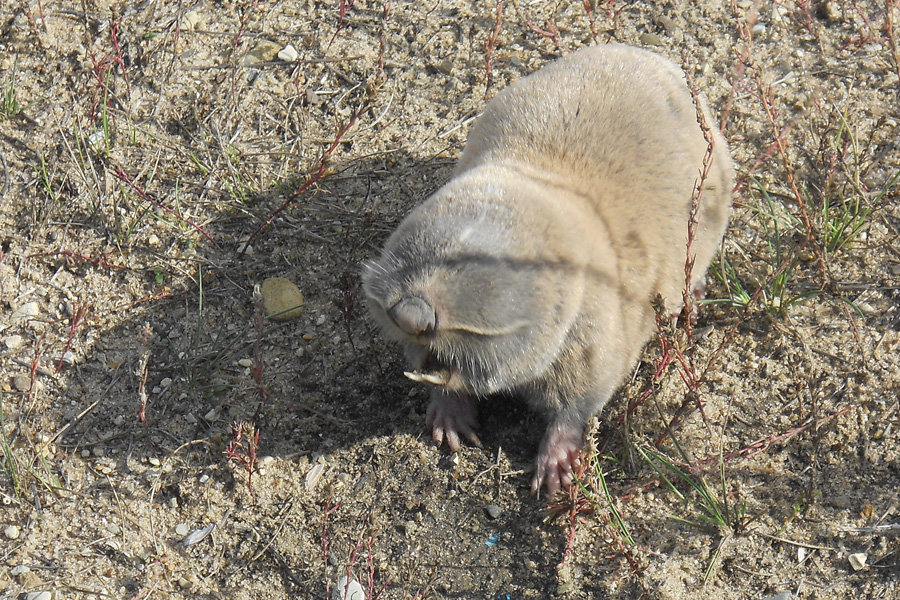
Terrestrial small mammals such as greater mole-rats are often the primary prey of long-legged buzzard.

The long-legged buzzard population in Georgia was found to live off of very small mammals. For instance, in Kvernaki Ridge, of 223 prey items, the main prey identified to species was social vole (Microtus socialis) (at 27.35%) and house mouse (Mus musculus) (at 7.17%), followed by assorted unidentified rodents (nearly 15% of diet) and Lacerta sp. (7.17%) and Caucasian agama (Paralaudakia caucasia) (4.93%). In the uplands of Ninotsminda, 244 prey items were recorded to feed mostly on unidentified small rodents, especially voles, as well as larger European water vole (7.78%) and identified common voles (5.74%). In both study areas of Georgia, mammals comprised just over 59% of the total remains, unidentified insects comprised 18.4% and 22.5% of prey numbers, birds 6.3% and 13.5% of the diet and reptiles 16.2% and 4.52% of the diets, respectively. It appears in Armenia that their diet was very reptile based, mostly small to medium-sized lizards but even the remains of a Greek tortoise (Testudo graeca) were reported. On the isle of Cyprus, 559 prey total prey items were found by combination of observation, prey remains and pellets. The main prey here by far were black rats (Rattus rattus) at 46.3% of the diet and starred agama (Stellagama stellio) at 30.4%. Overall in Cyprus, 49.1% of the diet was mammalian, reptiles more than 40%. Young rats, agamas and Schneider's skinks (Eumeces schneiderii) were well represented in the Cyprus diet, rendering an estimated rough two-thirds of the diet to consist of small prey weighing 100 g (3.5 oz) or less. However, a not inconsiderable amount of prey weighing in the range of 500 g (1.1 lb) were taken including young European hares, large whipsnake (Dolichophis caspius) (at 5% of the diet by number) and birds such as chukar (Alectoris chukar) and common wood pigeon (Columbus palumbus).

Accompanying food studies of the long-legged buzzards were conducted in the Israeli Judean Hills. Among 1239 total prey items from 32 nests here, the primary prey appeared to be Schneider's skinks at 16.3% and starred agamas at 14.6%, with an old study finding rock doves or feral pigeons (Columbus livia) the most significant at 19.6% of 561 prey items (pigeons were 10.7% amongst the 1239 prey items). Overall the Judean Hills long-legged buzzards preferred reptiles, at 47.2% of the foods, and birds, at 32.2%, rather strongly over mammals, 18.3%, which is not unexpected in the region's semi-desert environment. The predominant prey in Jordan was reportedly the fat sand rat (Psammomys obsesus) followed by again the starred agama and generally appeared not dissimilar from the diet of the species on Cyprus. On the Arabian Peninsula, long-legged buzzards were reported to feed mostly on the largish Uromastyx lizards, but also took hares, birds, and carrion. In northern Iran's Khar Turan National Park, 34 remains seemed to be predominantly represented by unidentified hares, occasionally supplemented by birds, tortoises and smaller mammals like Meriones and Gerbillus species. In southwestern Iran, 100 estimated prey items found by combination of prey remains, pellets and video recordings. The main prey were Caucasian squirrels (Sciurus anomalus) at 29.85% by number, 39.4% by biomass (with an estimated mean weight of 300 g (11 oz) and mature adult agamas such as brilliant ground agamas (Trapelus agilis), large-scaled agama (Laudakia nupta) (both estimated at 300 g (11 oz) when taken and small-scaled agama (Paralaudakia microlepis), these three comprising 30.3% of the diet collectively and 36.5% of the prey biomass. Several snakes like spotted whipsnakes (Hemorrhois ravergieri) were also taken frequently here.

While the diet is reasonably well studied in the European, eastern Mediterranean and Middle Eastern areas, farther east the diet is largely incidentally known, from secondary observations and rarely quantitatively analyzed (while the North African populations are almost entirely unknown in terms of dietary biology). In the East Kazakhstan Region, two long-legged buzzard nests were found to primarily contain the remains of contained the remains of Tamarisk gerbil (Meriones tamariscinus) and red-cheeked ground squirrels (Spermiphilus erythrogenys). A study in the Kalmykia region of Russia found that about 100 prey items of long-legged buzzards consisted of by diverse prey and less based in small mammals or lizards than other regions. The most frequent identified prey here were unidentified larks, at 18% of the diet by number and 4.7% by biomass, while very young juvenile European hare, at estimated mean of 400 g (14 oz) body weight, were second in number, at 9%, and primary in biomass at 21.8%. Other significant prey here were social voles, at 9% by number as well, and adult rooks (Corvus frugilegus), at a mean weight of 460 g (1.01 lb) comprising 15.7% of the biomass. In northeastern China, the diet was fairly well studied, albeit in a somewhat small study. Of 50 prey items, here great gerbils (Rhombomys opimus) led the diet at 48%, followed by Tartar sand boa (Eryx miliaris) (18%), cape hare (Lepus capensis) (6%), goitered gazelle (Gazella subgutturosa) (6%) (likely but not certainly taken to the nest as carrion) and Mongolian finch (Bucanetes mongolicus) (6%). Overall mammals made 60% of the diet, reptiles 22% and birds 18%. The diet in the Indian subcontinent is quite diverse, with prey often observed to be taken consisting of small mammals, being up to 85% of the diet, with primary prey often being Indian desert jird (Meriones hurrianae) in arid areas and voles and pikas in highland areas. Lizards are significant, especially Indian spiny-tailed lizard (Saara hardwickii) and agamas, as well as snakes and various other prey.

=== Interspecific relationships ===
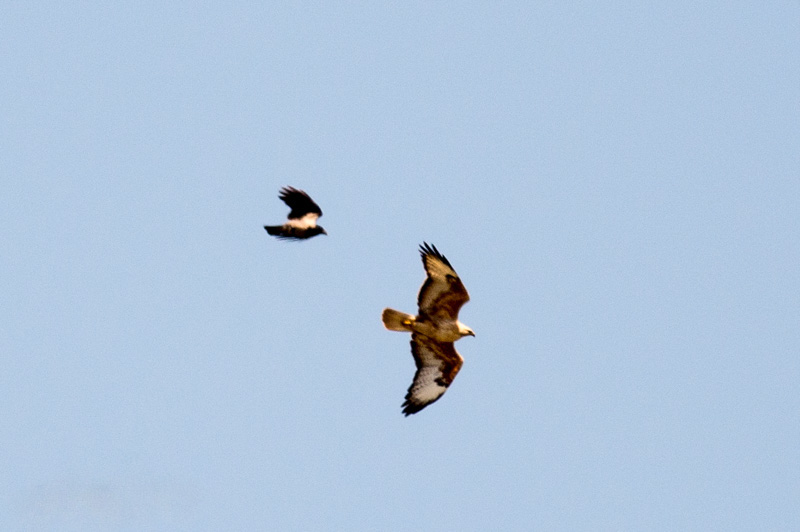
A crow flies into mob a long-legged buzzard.

The long-legged buzzard occurs over a broad range across Eurasia. They often co-exist in several areas with the steppe subspecies of the common buzzard. Little is known how the two co-exist, but the long-legged buzzard is known to be more of a bird of open and rocky habitat rather than wooded edge, nesting often on or about rocks rather than in trees. Both the common and long-legged buzzards are often highly opportunistic but the long-legged buzzard is liable to take a variety of small mammals such as mole-rats, hamsters, ground squirrels, rats and various reptiles such as lizards and to be generally less strongly reliant on voles as prey. It was documented in northeastern Greece that the two species often engaged in interspecific conflicts around the nests, with the common buzzard comprising the largest percent of aggressive interactions documented for long-legged buzzards, at 10 out of 47 such interactions. In their distribution, long-legged buzzards often share relatively open, sunny and partially arid habitats and prey extensively with a number of other raptors, from smaller, weaker harriers of about three species to larger more powerful eagles such as eastern imperial eagles (Aquila heliaca) and steppe eagle (Aquila nipalensis), as well as quite often saker falcons (Falco cherrug) It was documented that the long-legged buzzard was the most significant nest constructor for nesting saker falcons in Kazakhstan, with the falcons usually using old or alternate buzzard nests. Nesting habitat often coincides with and prey is somewhat similar to the Eurasian eagle-owl (Bubo bubo), as in Bulgaria where they can even nest in the same groves, but the much larger eagle-owl can seldom be said to compete directly given its nocturnality. Evidence in the Judean Foothills shows that the long-legged buzzard is competing with the short-toed snake eagle (Circateus gallicus) there. Although there were differences in the diet, the short-toed taking more snakes, the long-legged buzzard more lizards and birds, with partitioning in primary hunting times, the long-legged buzzard fared well in interactions being the swifter and often more aggressive raptor than the somewhat larger eagle.

The long-legged buzzard appears to occupy an intermediate position in the food guild of medium to large diurnal raptors in steppe, meadows, plateaus and coastal areas, in keeping with its body size (which is large for a buzzard but smaller than many species of eagle that it is obligated to share habitats with). There is little information on their position except for their place in the food chain. Their main predator appears to be Eurasian eagle-owls. Although no predation acts have been documented in Bulgaria, in many other mutual parts of the range, long-legged buzzards have turned up in the diet of the powerful eagle-owls. Other larger raptors birds are known to occasionally hunt down long-legged buzzards as well. These have been documented to include eastern imperial eagles, steppe eagles and Bonelli's eagles (Aquila fasciata). A few raptorial birds have also turned up at different times in the diet of long-legged buzzards as well and, compared to the common buzzard, the lesser studied long-legged buzzards may be more prone to interspecific killings from the number reported despite their being relatively few prey studies. Among the raptorial birds documented as apparent prey of long-legged buzzards are Eurasian sparrowhawks (Accipiter nisus), levant sparrowhawk (Accipiter brevipes), short-toed snake eagle, barn owl (Tyto alba), European scops owl (Otus scops), little owl (Athene noctua), long-eared owl (Asio otus ), short-eared owl (Asio flammeus), common kestrel (Falco tinnunculus) and red-footed falcon (Falco vespertinus). Mammalian carnivores are also known to be occasional prey for long-legged buzzards as well, including least weasels (Mustela nivalis ) and marbled polecat (Vormela peregusna) as well as, although these are more likely taken either while young or as carrion, red foxes (Vulpes vulpes) and European wildcats (Felis silvestris).

== Breeding ==
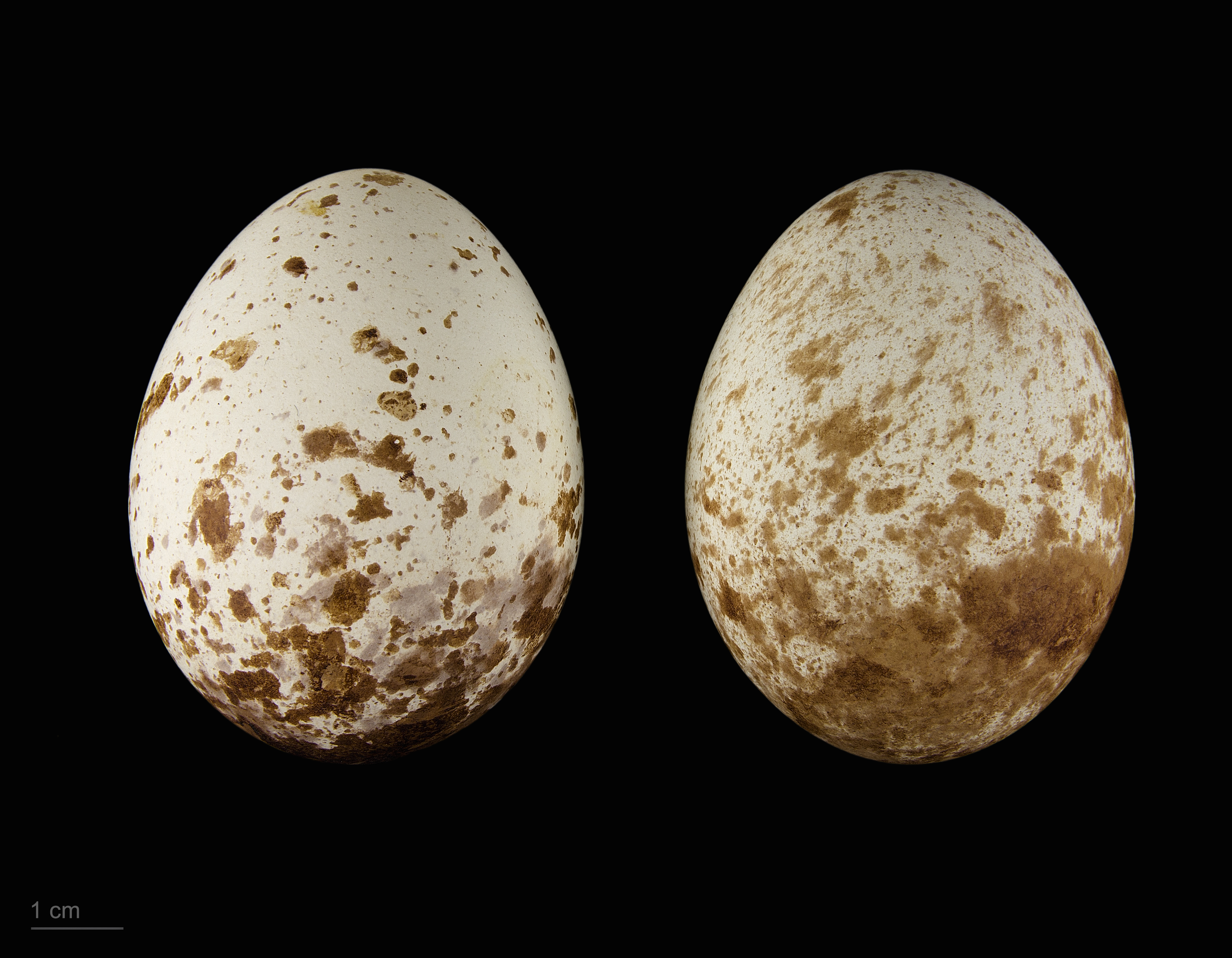
Buteo rufinus cirtensis - MHNT

The long-legged buzzard is, as is typical for Buteo and accipitrids, usually rather solitary outside of the pair bond. However, occasionally forms very loose breeding groups, at times several as close as 300 m (980 ft) or in the same crag. It is also slightly gregarious sometimes in passage in small groups, rarely traveling in large flocks. The long-legged buzzard's aerial display similar but less well documented than that of the common buzzard. They tend to engage in mutual high circling, with both sexes diving at each other. Additionally, an impressive sky dance is sometimes undertaken by the male in which he circles before plunging on part closed wings, swooping up again, after which he may engage in tilting or even looping the loop at the zenith, drops nearly vertically, repeating dance one or more times. Territories are fairly large for long-legged buzzards. In Ukraine, there was an estimated per pair occupancy of about 120 km^{2} (46 sq mi) while in Kazakhstan, in an area of 100 km^{2} (39 sq mi), there an estimated mean of 2.8 nesting pairs.

The breeding season of the long-legged buzzard can fall at variable times of the years. In Europe, it tends to breed from March to July. Similarly phenology of breeding is reported in Armenia and even in Iraq. In the United Arab Emirates, a nest with eggs which must have been laid in December was reported, with pair occupancy lasting to at least March. In Morocco, nuptial displays begin in January and February, peaking in March, with egg laying usually from March to April in the northern part of the country and from February to April in southern part. Elsewhere in North Africa, breeding seems to fall somewhat earlier from February to March, with possibly fledging completed by the month of May. The nesting period in Pakistan is about March to July, but records of eggs as late as June may refer to second or replacement clutches being laid. The nest is a large pile of sticks and branches, typically lined with green leaves, twigs, straw and wool. Nests are fairly large structures, averaging around 71 to 99 cm (28 to 39 in) in diameter, as in Bulgaria and Kazakhstan, respectively, but could easily exceed 1 m (3.3 ft) across in some cases. The average depth was 20 and 49 cm (7.9 and 19.3 in), ranging in Bulgaria and Kazakhstan from 15 to 100 cm (5.9 to 39.4 in) in depth.

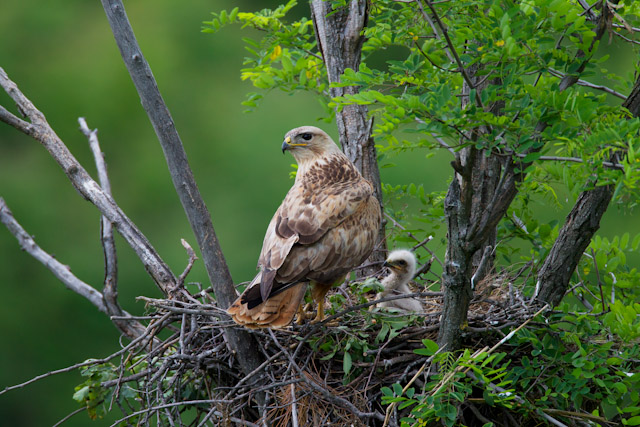
An apparent adult male tends to the chicks in a long-legged buzzard nest.

Often this species nests are located on a cliff ledge, crag or low rocks, often in fairly shaded relative to the often sunny environs. In Kazakhstan, more than 75% of 53 nests were on such ledges or in granite niches, with a further 11% on power poles, 8% in trees and 4% on high hills less frequently nest ground, in a tree or steep slope or old large bird nest. In Cyprus, of 22 nests, only 1 was in a tree, while the rest were a variety of cliffs from sea cliffs to mountainous areas of around 1,100 m (3,600 ft) altitude. All known nests in northwestern China as well as in southwestern Iran were located on cliffs. In Bulgaria, in the absence of natural rocks, the long-legged buzzards largely adapted to nesting alongside manmade quarries rather than use trees. Nesting locations were exceptional then in Ukraine where most (85.7%) were built in oak trees, with one additionally placed in a pear tree. Data from the Volga region of Russia also suggests that tree nesting is common for the species there, especially in Malus apple trees. Additionally, the few known nests from Pakistan have appeared to be located in trees such as Abies firs or junipers. Some nests along the perimeter of old buildings have been documented as well. At times the long-legged buzzard will use the old nest of another species, apparently largely ravens such as common ravens (Corvus corax) or brown-necked raven (Corvus ruficollis). Nests are frequently reused in subsequent years and added to over time.

The long-legged buzzard may lay a variably sized clutch. Typically 2 to 4 eggs are laid but from 1 to 6 egg clutches have been documented. The average clutch size in Ukraine was 2.7, in a sample of 8. The same clutch size mean was reported in Cyprus as well. The average clutch size in North Africa was reported (in a sample of 57) as 2.54. The clutch size in northwestern Iran averaged 3. In northwestern China, the mean clutch size was 3.3. The eggs are slightly rough, oval and largely whitish with a yellowish tint and a few wart like projections, with indistinct grey-brown to reddish brown markings, which tend to fade at the pointer tip of the oval. The average egg sizes in Ukraine, Armenia and northwestern China were 59.5 mm × 46.9 mm (2.34 in × 1.85 in), 60.3 mm × 47.2 mm (2.37 in × 1.86 in) and 56 mm × 43 mm (2.2 in × 1.7 in), respectively. Egg heights ranged from 53 to 63 mm (2.1 to 2.5 in) and diameter ranged from 42 to 49.5 mm (1.65 to 1.95 in), while in Armenia eggs weighed 72.9 g (2.57 oz) on average and in China they weighed 68.2 g (2.41 oz). Incubation appears to last for about 28 to 30 days.

Upon hatching, the young are expectedly semi-altricial. The brood size averages about 2.3. The chicks initially have fine white down at first and then develop a second down coat with white to creamy white. The chicks are brooded considerably, especially by their mother for about 30 days, after which she may resume hunting. Fledgling of the chicks may occur at between 40 and 46 days of age for the young buzzards. The dependence period after they leave the nest can be relatively prolonged for a temperate-zone raptor, reaching perhaps a month in total. Breeding success rates are relatively quite poorly known in long-legged buzzards, with many sources failing to find extensive data on this topic. Data from Cyprus shows the nesting success varying greatly, perhaps based on food supplies, with an annual mean success rate varying from 46% to 93%. In northwestern China, the mean number of fledglings per nest was 0.7 while the mean fledged from successful nests was 1.4. The maximum estimated mean productivity per pair in Israel was about 0.96.

== Status ==
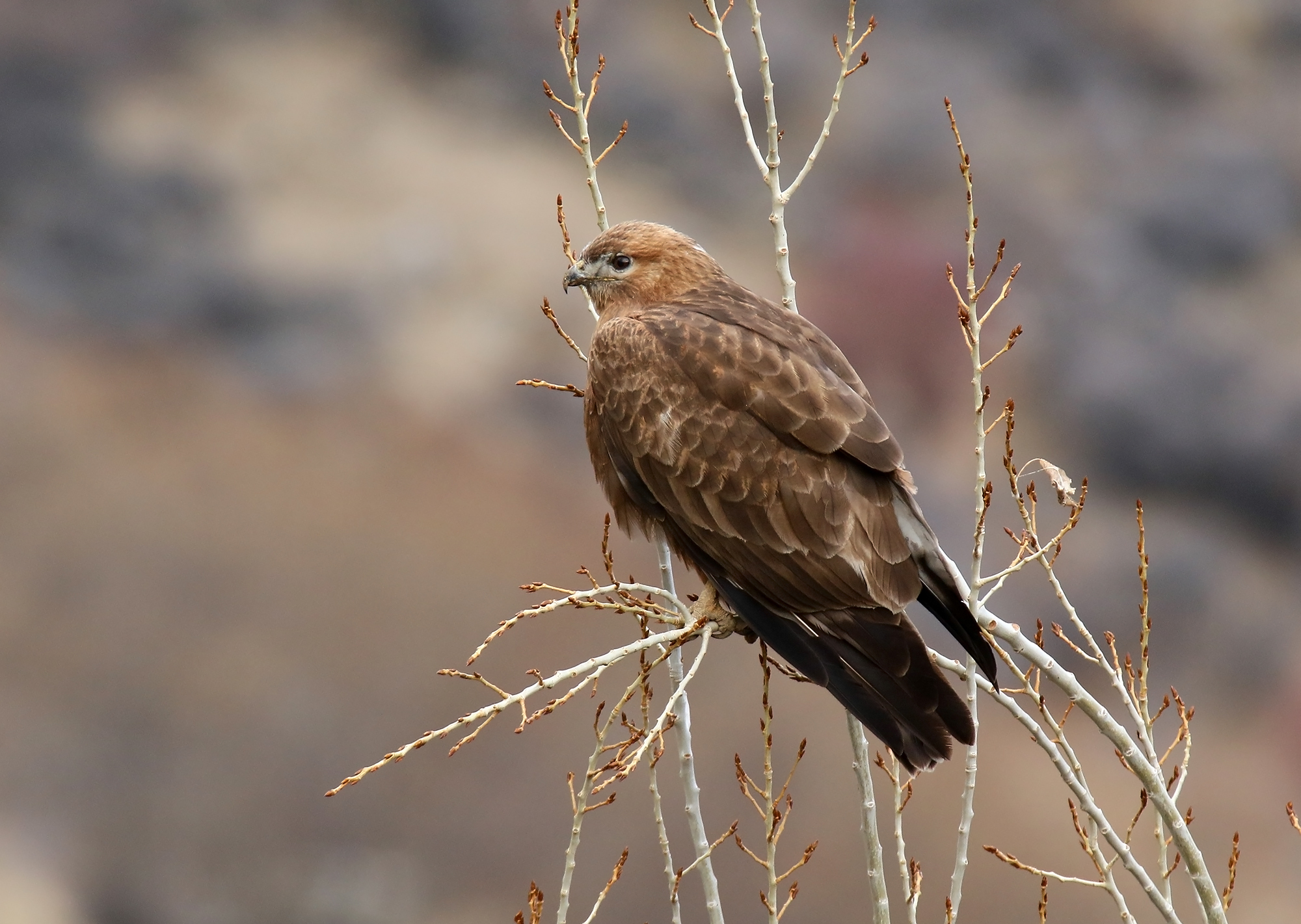
A perched long-legged buzzard.

Some declines have been reported in western Russia and generally the long-legged buzzard may be somewhat less numerous than they once were in the more western parts of the range. On the other hand, since the 1990s, there have been recent increases reported in Europe, mainly Bulgaria, where expanding population and post-breeding dispersals have enlarged their range in Hungarian steppes. In the 1990s, the estimated population in the Western Palearctic was between 5000 and 15,000 pairs while by 2015 the estimated population where was 11,800-19,200 pairs breeding pairs. The following estimates show from the smaller numbers of the 1990s to the generally higher estimated numbers by 2015. There are an estimated 800-1500 pairs nesting in western Russia, 200-750 pairs occurring in Bulgaria and about 60-300 pairs in Greece and 50 pairs in Ukraine, with fewer in Albania and a few other countries. Europe contains less than a quarter of the global population and the declines from historic numbers were still over 30%, so the long-legged buzzard is considered locally a Vulnerable species in Europe. Furthermore, about 500 pairs are estimated to nest in Israel, as recorded after slight population depletions due largely to pesticide use in the 1950s. The Turkish population is ample at 1000-10,000 pairs, probably 3000-6000; with about 1000-2500 in Azerbaijan. Additionally, numbers are considered unchanged in Armenia. There are less well known populations and trends in North Africa, with perhaps 400 pairs in Tunisia, 1000 or more pairs in Morocco. A small number nest in the Arabian Peninsula. Arabia has thought to experience a 5% decline in long-legged buzzard populations, perhaps due to overly extensive conversion of habitat to farmland and stone quarries. Saudi Arabia holds about 600 pairs, Oman and Yemen both about 100 pairs and the United Arab Emirates about 5 pairs. Fewer figures still are available from Asia, where the species is considered uncommon to rare in Pakistan, slightly more common in Kashmir and variously rare to uncommon in northwestern China and Turkmenia. Good habitat and strong circumstantial evidence of strong continuous breeding pairs in Central Asia has led to a projected fairly ample but poorly documented population in this region.
