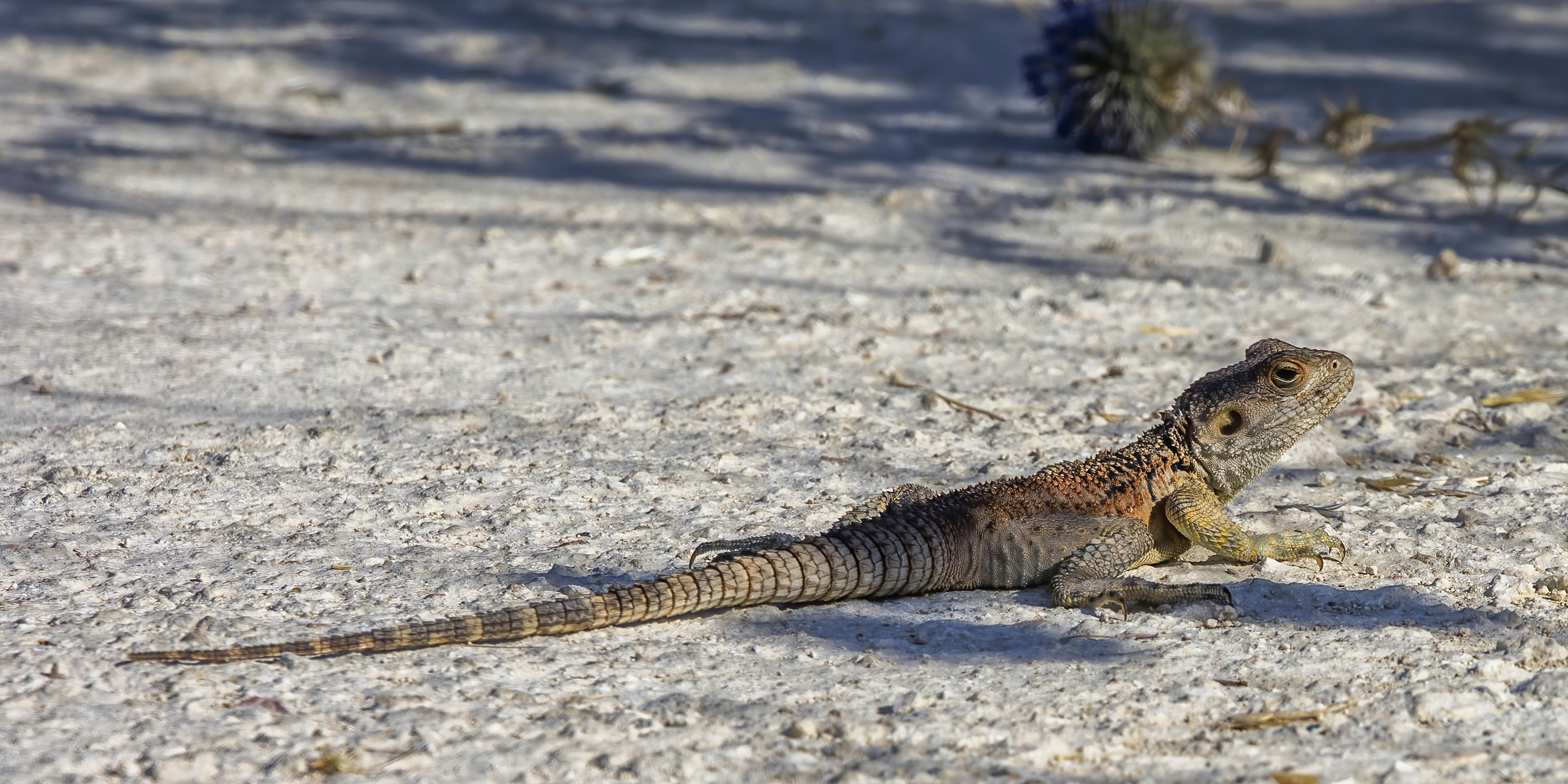

Conservation status
- Least Concern (IUCN 3.1)

Scientific classification
- Kingdom: Animalia
- Phylum: Chordata
- Class: Reptilia
- Order: Squamata
- Suborder: Iguania
- Family: Agamidae
- Genus: Laudakia
- Species: L. cypriaca

Binomial name
- Laudakia cypriaca (Daan, 1967)

Synonyms
- Agama stellio cypriaca Daan, 1967; Laudakia stellio cypriaca (Daan, 1967); Stellagama stellio cypriaca (Daan, 1967)

= Laudakia cypriaca =

Cyprus rock agama

Species of lizard

Laudakia cypriaca, also known as Cyprus rock agama, is a species of agamid lizard. It is endemic to Cyprus.

== Taxonomy ==
The Cyprus rock agama was originally described as a subspecies of Agama stellio (now Laudakia stellio). However, a 2022 revision of Laudakia stellio raised the former Laudakia stellio cypriaca to the full species rank, along with Laudakia vulgaris.

The Cyprus rock agama is sometimes placed in the genus Stellagama, but this genus is generally not recognized as being distinct from Laudakia.

== Distribution and habitat ==
The agama is endemic to Cyprus, where it occurs throughout the island at elevations of up to 1,930 m. It inhabits rocky areas with a range of arid, semi-arid, and Mediterranean habitats. It adapts well to human-modified areas such as towns, gardens, and agricultural areas, and is known to nest in walls, warehouses, and the edges of fields. It also lives in phrygana shrubland, but this is not thought to be a preferred habitat and Cyprus rock agamas living in these areas have probably been expelled from more ideal habitats by other agamas.

== Ecology ==
The Cyprus rock agama is diurnal and is generally found on the ground, although it can also be seen on carob, palm and olive trees, as well as pines. Average substrate temperature for this species is 34°C, but related species of agamas have been observed being active on surfaces when temperatures are as high as 60°C. Breeding in the species has not been studied but other agamas lay clutches of 3 to 12 eggs that hatch two to four months after laying. The species is mainly insectivorous and supplements its diet with small vertebrates and fruit.

== Status ==
The Cyprus rock agama is listed as being of least concern on the IUCN Red List due to it large range, stable population, and adaptability to human settlements. It is found throughout Cyprus and is presumably present in some protected areas. It is very common in human-modified habitats, but is hunted by cats, which may threaten some populations near humans. Laudakia stellio, which was formerly considered to be conspecific with the Cyprus rock agama, is sold as a pet in Europe. It is not known whether Cyprus rock agamas are part of this trade.

One study found that in areas with a large tourist presence, agamas fled from humans at an average distance of 2.7 m, as compared to 4.5 m for agamas living in area with few tourists. This suggests that the lizards become habituated to humans and use them as a "shield" to deter predators in the former regions, and may become more vulnerable to predators in the off-season when there are few tourists.
