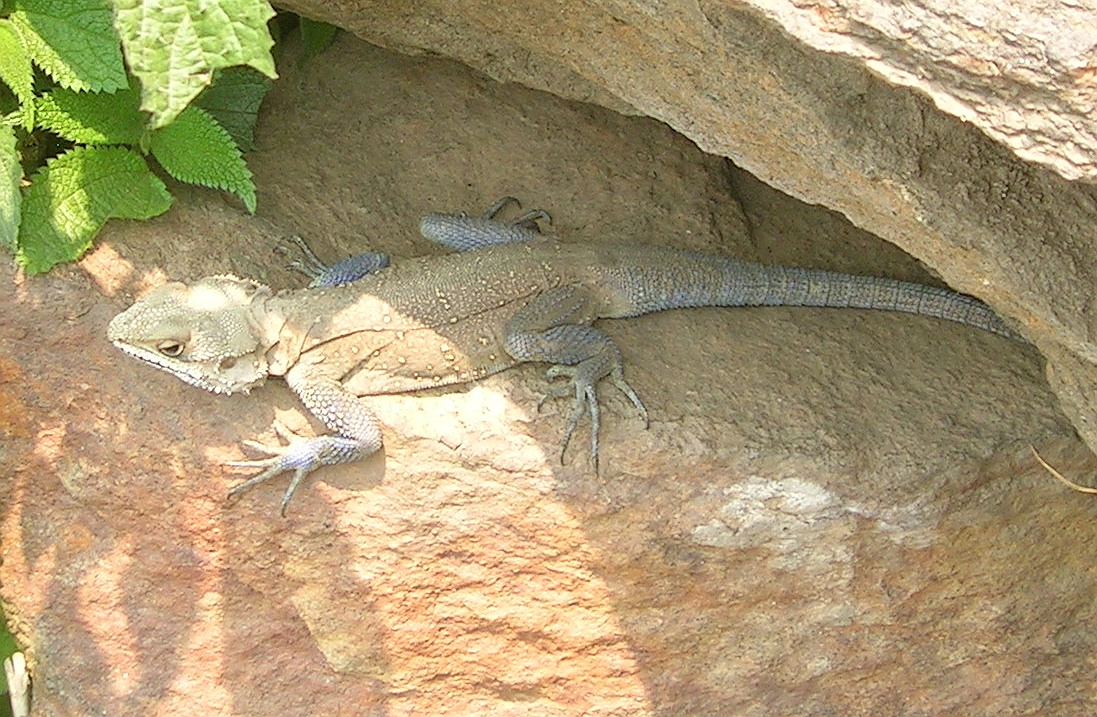
- Kashmir rock agama (Laudakia tuberculata)

Scientific classification
- Kingdom: Animalia
- Phylum: Chordata
- Class: Reptilia
- Order: Squamata
- Suborder: Iguania
- Family: Agamidae
- Subfamily: Agaminae
- Genus: Laudakia; Gray, 1845

Type species
- Laudakia tuberculata Gray, 1827

= Laudakia =

Genus of lizards

Laudakia is a genus of lizards, commonly known as Asian rock agamas, in the family Agamidae. The genus is found mostly in Asia, with some species in Southern Europe.

== Taxonomy ==
Some species of Laudakia, sensu lato, are now recognized in the new genus Paralaudakia found in Eurasia. For African agamas see the genera Agama and Acanthocercus.

== Species and subspecies ==
Listed alphabetically.

- Laudakia agrorensis (Stoliczka, 1872) – Agror agama
- Laudakia cypriaca (Daan, 1967) – Cyprus rock agama
- Laudakia dayana (Stoliczka, 1871) – Haridwar agama
- Laudakia melanura Blyth, 1854 – black agama
- Laudakia nupta (De Filippi, 1843) – large-scaled (rock) agama
  - Laudakia nupta nupta (De Filippi, 1843)
  - Laudakia nupta fusca (Blanford, 1876)
- Laudakia nuristanica (S. Anderson & Leviton, 1969) – Leviton's rock agama
- Laudakia pakistanica (Baig, 1989) – Pakistani agama
  - Laudakia pakistanica pakistanica (Baig, 1989)
  - Laudakia pakistanica auffenbergi Baig & Böhme, 1996
  - Laudakia pakistanica khani Baig & Böhme, 1996
- Laudakia papenfussi Zhao, 1998 – Papenfuss's rock agama
- Laudakia sacra (M.A. Smith, 1935) – Anan's rock agama
- Laudakia stellio (Linnaeus, 1758) – starred agama, roughtail rock agama
  - Laudakia stellio daani (Beutler & Frör, 1980)
  - Laudakia stellio stellio (Linnaeus, 1758)
- Laudakia tuberculata (Gray, 1827) – tuberculated agama, Kashmir rock agama
- Laudakia vulgaris (Sonnini & Latreille, 1801) – Egyptian rock agama
  - Laudakia vulgaris vulgaris (Sonnini & Latreille, 1801)
  - Laudakia vulgaris brachydactyla (Haas, 1951)
  - Laudakia vulgaris picea (Parker, 1935)
- Laudakia wui Zhao, 1998 – Wui's rock agama

=== Moved to genus Acanthocercus ===
- Acanthocercus adramitanus (J. Anderson, 1896) – Anderson's rock agama
- Acanthocercus atricollis (A. Smith, 1849) – black-necked tree agama

=== Moved to genus Paralaudakia ===
- Paralaudakia badakhshana (S. Anderson & Leviton, 1969) – Badakhshana rock agama
- Paralaudakia bochariensis (Nikolsky, 1897)
- Paralaudakia caucasia (Eichwald, 1831) – Caucasian agama
- Paralaudakia erythrogastra (Nikolsky, 1896) – redbelly rock agama
- Paralaudakia himalayana (Steindachner, 1867) – Himalayan agama
- Paralaudakia lehmanni (Nikolsky, 1896) – Turkestan agama
- Paralaudakia microlepis (Blanford, 1874) – small-scaled agama
- Paralaudakia stoliczkana (Blanford, 1875) – Mongolian rock agama

Nota bene: A binomial authority or trinomial authority in parentheses indicates that the species or subspecies was originally described in a different genus.
