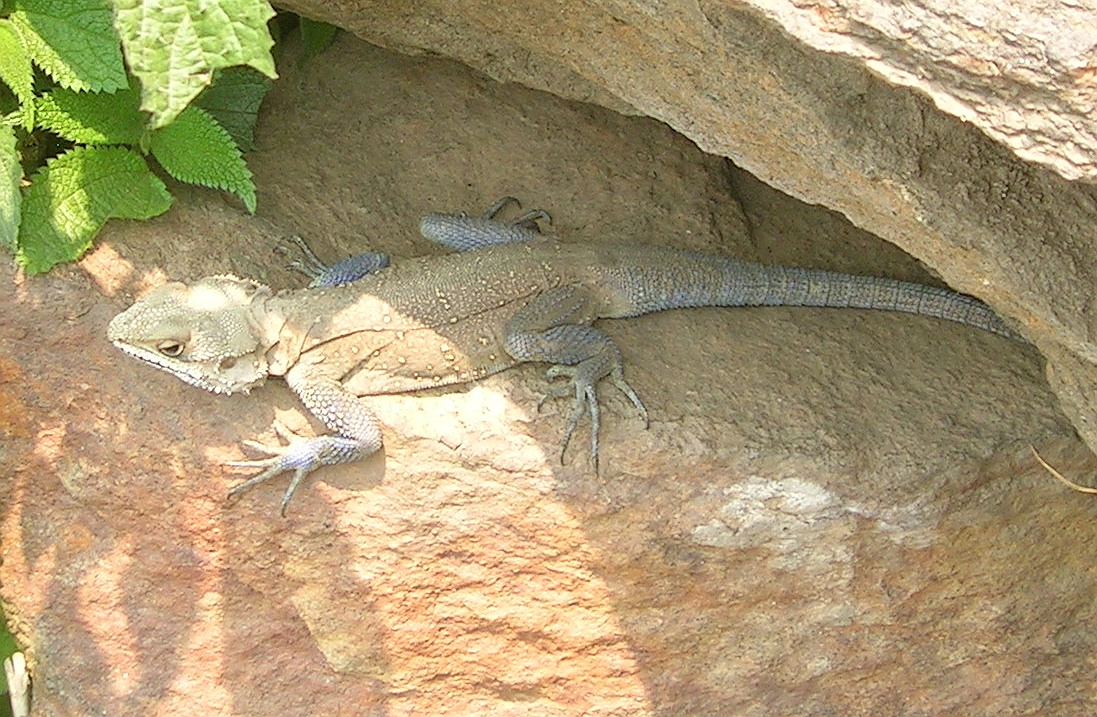

Conservation status
- Least Concern (IUCN 3.1)

Scientific classification
- Kingdom: Animalia
- Phylum: Chordata
- Class: Reptilia
- Order: Squamata
- Suborder: Iguania
- Family: Agamidae
- Genus: Laudakia
- Species: L. tuberculata

Binomial name
- Laudakia tuberculata (Gray, 1827)

Synonyms
- Agama tuberculata – basionym Stellio tuberculatus Stellio indicus Blyth, 1853

= Laudakia tuberculata =

Species of lizard

Laudakia tuberculata (Kashmir rock agama or tuberculated agama) is a species of agamid lizard found in northern Pakistan, northern India (W Himalaya, Kashmir, Punjab), Nepal, eastern Afghanistan (needs confirmation), and western China (Tibetan Plateau).

== Description ==
"Head much depressed; snout longer than the diameter of the orbit; nostril lateral, below the canthus rostralis, slightly tubular. Upper-head scales smooth or feebly keeled: occipital not enlarged; small, closely set spinose scales on the sides of the head near the ear and the neck; ear entirely exposed, larger than the eye-opening. Throat strongly plicate; no gular pouch. Body depressed, with a more or less distinct fold on each side of the back; scales on the neck and sides minute, almost granular, keeled, uniform, or intermixed with scattered enlarged scales; those on the vertebral region enlarged, equal, rhomboidal, imbricate, strongly keeled; a very slight indication of a nuchal denticulation; ventral scales smooth, nearly as large as the enlarged dorsals. Limbs strong, with compressed digits; the scales on the upper surface of the limbs much enlarged and very strongly keeled; third and fourth fingers equal, or fourth very slightly longer; fourth toe slightly longer than third, fifth extending beyond first. Tail rounded, much depressed at the base, covered with moderate-sized strongly keeled scales arranged in rings; its length equals 2.5 to 3 times the distance from gular fold to vent.

Males with a large patch of thickened preanal scales and a patch of similar scales on the middle of the belly. Olive-brown above, spotted or speckled with blackish, sometimes with small yellowish spots; the breeding male's throat blue, with light spots; sometimes a light vertebral band."

== Habitat ==
Laudakia tuberculata inhabits rocky mountain areas at elevations of 790–3,660 m (2,590–12,010 ft) above sea level.

== Gallery ==
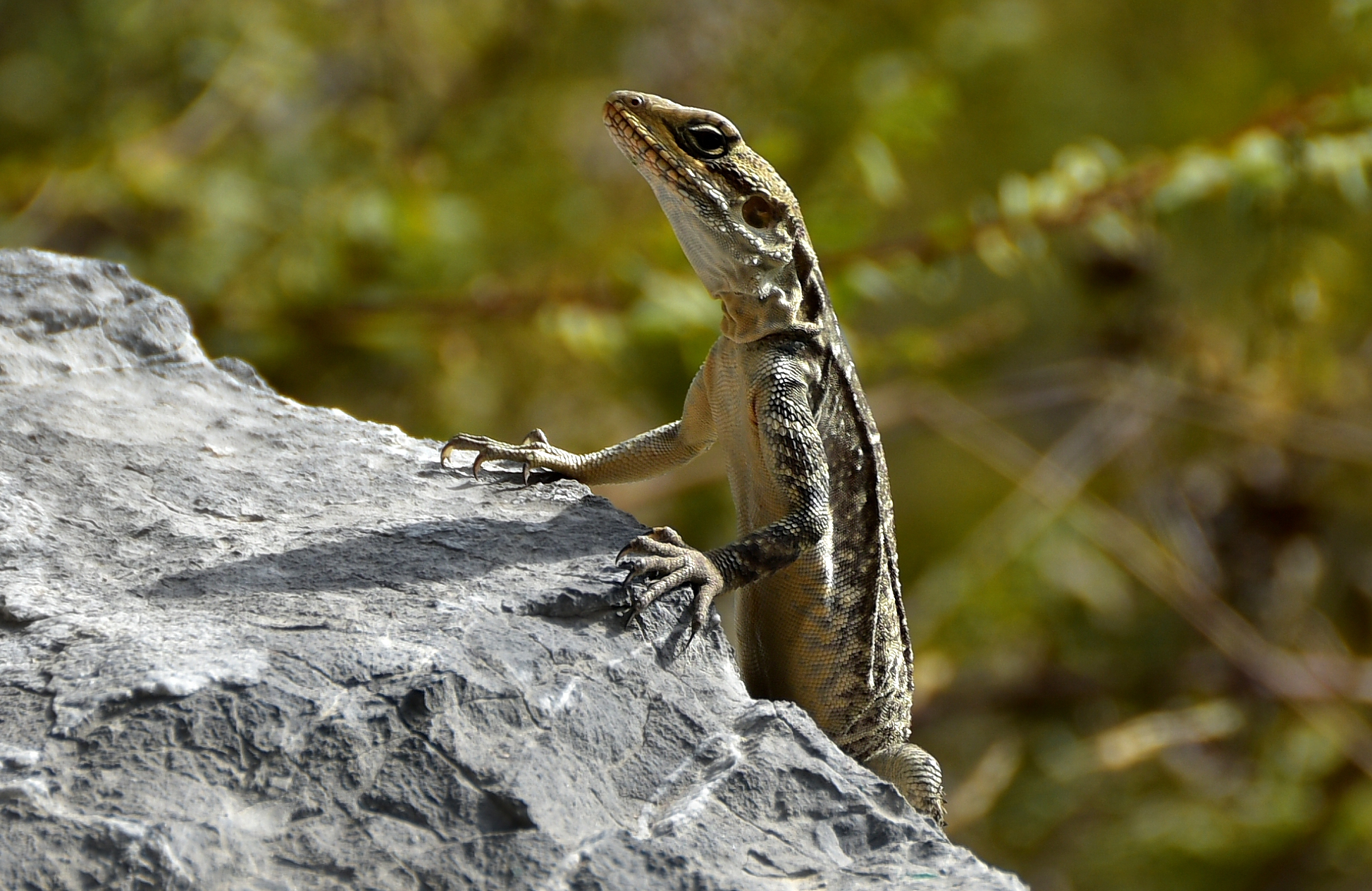
Kashmir rock agama
