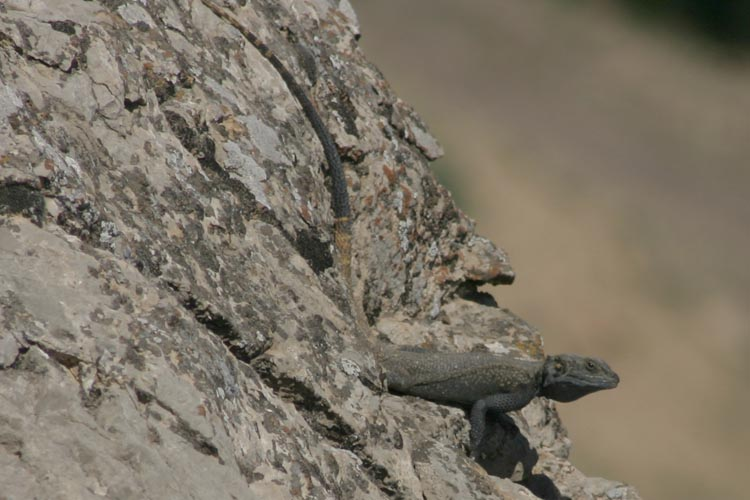

Conservation status
- Least Concern (IUCN 3.1)

Scientific classification
- Kingdom: Animalia
- Phylum: Chordata
- Class: Reptilia
- Order: Squamata
- Suborder: Iguania
- Family: Agamidae
- Genus: Laudakia
- Species: L. nupta

Binomial name
- Laudakia nupta (De Filippi, 1843)

Synonyms
- Laudakia nupta nupta: Agama nupta De Filipi, 1843; Stellio nuptus Blanford, 1876; Stellio carinatus Duméril, 1851 (fide Smith, 1935); Agama flavicauda Werner, 1897 (fide Wermuth, 1967); Agama caucasica Schmidt, 1939; Agama nupta nupta Minton, 1966; Laudakia nupta fusca: Laudakia nupta fusca (Blanford, 1876); Stellio nuptus var. fuscus Blanford, 1876; Agama nupta var. fusca Boulenger, 1885; Laudakia fusca Cheatsazan et al., 2008

= Laudakia nupta =

Species of reptile

Laudakia nupta is a species of lizard from Iraq, Iran, Afghanistan, and Pakistan. It was described in 1843. There are two subspecies, Laudakia nupta nupta and Laudakia nupta fusca.

== Taxonomy ==
L. nupta was described by Filippo De Filippi in 1843. Its taxonomy has been moved many times, having previously been classified under the genera Agama and Stellio. The current scientific name comes from the past participle of the Latin verb nūbo, meaning to cover or veil. The meaning shifted over time, coming to mean a bride that covers herself for the groom. The bride's crown is a reference to the lizard's crown-like crest.

Laudakia nupta nupta is commonly known as large-scaled agama or large-scaled rock agama, and Laudakia nupta fusca is commonly known as yellow-headed rock agama.

== Description ==
L. nupta is a large sized lizard with a heavy head and nostrils on the canthus rostralis. The body is moderately depressed, and there are vertebral enlarged scales covering most of the lizard's back. It has a long tail with segments of three whorls. L. nupta has oviparous reproduction.

The subspecies L. nupta nupta is yellowish or reddish brown, and the vertebral enlarged scales are strongly keeled.

The subspecies L. nupta fusca has no nuchal fold, and the vertebral enlarged scales are strongly mucronate.

== Diet ==
Plants are the main source of food for L. nupta. L. nupta fusca is omnivorous and are known to consume Daphne oleoides, beetles, and ants.

== Habitat and distribution ==
L. nupta is typically found in western Asia. The subspecies L. nupta nupta can be found in eastern Iraq, Iran, Afghanistan, and Pakistan. It resides in large limestone rocks and outcrops with deep crevices, and in man-made structures like mud-brick homes and old buildings. The subspecies L. nupta fusca can be found in southern Pakistan and southern Iran.
