= Laudakia dayana =

Conservation status
- Data Deficient (IUCN 3.1)

Scientific classification
- Kingdom: Animalia
- Phylum: Chordata
- Class: Reptilia
- Order: Squamata
- Suborder: Iguania
- Family: Agamidae
- Genus: Laudakia
- Species: L. dayana

Binomial name
- Laudakia dayana (Stoliczka, 1871)

Synonyms
- Stellio dayanus Stoliczka, 1871; Agama dayana — Boulenger, 1885; Laudakia dayana — Baig & Böhme, 1997

Species of lizard

Laudakia dayana, commonly known as the Haridwar agama, is a species of lizard in the family Agamidae. The species is native to extreme northern India.

== Geographic range ==
L. dayana is found in the Indian state of Uttarakhand, which includes Haridwar, and in the union territories of Ladakh, Jammu and Kashmir.

== Etymology ==
The specific name, dayana, is in honor of English ichthyologist Francis Day.

== Habitat ==
The preferred natural habitat of L. dayana is rocky areas, at altitudes of about 3,000 m (9,800 ft).

== Reproduction ==
L. dayana is oviparous.
