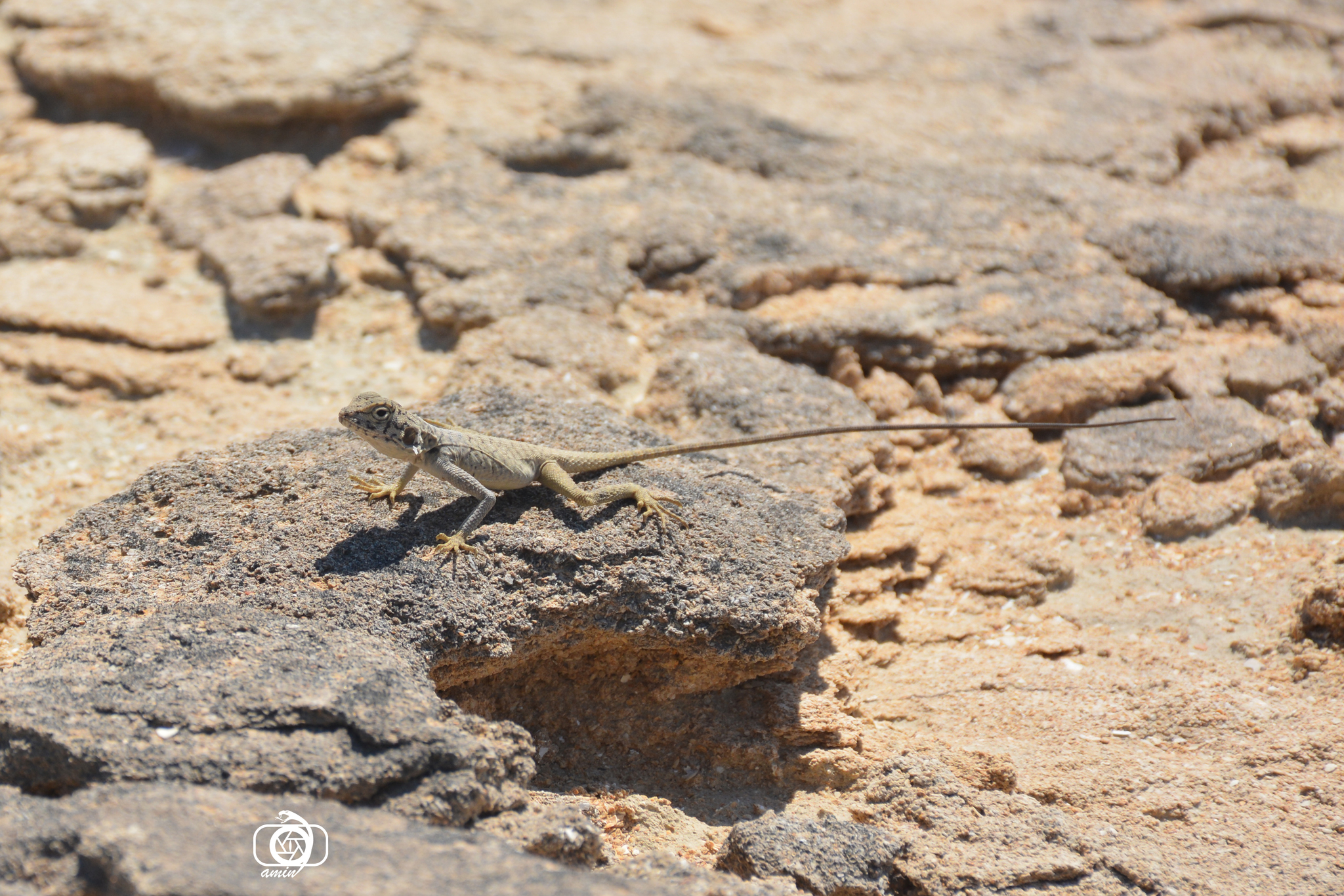

Conservation status
- Least Concern (IUCN 3.1)

Scientific classification
- Kingdom: Animalia
- Phylum: Chordata
- Class: Reptilia
- Order: Squamata
- Suborder: Iguania
- Family: Agamidae
- Genus: Laudakia
- Species: L. melanura

Binomial name
- Laudakia melanura Blyth, 1854

= Laudakia melanura =

Black agama

Species of lizard

Laudakia melanura, also known as the black agama or black rock agama, is a species of agamid lizard. It is found in Iran, Afghanistan, Pakistan, and northern India.

There are three subspecies:

- Laudakia melanura melanura (Blyth, 1854) – southeastern Iran, southeastern Afghanistan, and Pakistan (Salt Range in northern Punjab (type locality), northwestern Frontier Province, western Sindh, western Balochistan)
- Laudakia melanura nasiri Baig, 1999 – endemic to southern Pakistan (Toba Kakar Range, Balochistan)
- Laudakia melanura lirata (Blanford, 1874) – Pakistan, Iran
