= Laudakia pakistanica =

Conservation status
- Least Concern (IUCN 3.1)

Scientific classification
- Kingdom: Animalia
- Phylum: Chordata
- Class: Reptilia
- Order: Squamata
- Suborder: Iguania
- Family: Agamidae
- Genus: Laudakia
- Species: L. pakistanica

Binomial name
- Laudakia pakistanica (Baig, 1989)

Synonyms
- Agama pakistanica Baig, 1989

Species of lizard

Laudakia pakistanica, the Pakistani agama, a species of agamid lizard found in northern Pakistan and northern India, in the disputed territory claimed by both states.

== Distribution ==
Three subspecies are known:

- khani: Pakistan, Terra typica: Hadar (Chilas), Federal Administered Northern Area, Pakistan, 32° 25' N, 74° E, elevation 945 m.
- auffenbergi: Pakistan; Terra typica: Besham, Distr. Swat, Northwest Frontier Province, Pakistan, 35° 55' N, 72° 55' E, 700 m elevation.
- pakistanica: Pakistan; Terra typica: Jaglotgah, Pakistan.
