= Laudakia papenfussi =

Conservation status
- Least Concern (IUCN 3.1)

Scientific classification
- Kingdom: Animalia
- Phylum: Chordata
- Class: Reptilia
- Order: Squamata
- Suborder: Iguania
- Family: Agamidae
- Genus: Laudakia
- Species: L. papenfussi

Binomial name
- Laudakia papenfussi Zhao, 1998

Species of lizard

Laudakia papenfussi, also known commonly as Papenfuss's rock agama, is a species of lizard in the family Agamidae. The species is endemic to Tibet (China).

== Etymology ==
The specific name, papenfussi, is in honor of American herpetologist Theodore Johnstone Papenfuss.

== Habitat ==
The preferred natural habitat of Laudakia papenfussi is rocky areas with crevices and caves, at elevations of 2,700–3,300 m (8,900–10,800 ft).

== Reproduction ==
Laudakia papenfussi is oviparous.
