= Laudakia agrorensis =

Agror agama

Conservation status
- Least Concern (IUCN 3.1)

Scientific classification
- Kingdom: Animalia
- Phylum: Chordata
- Class: Reptilia
- Order: Squamata
- Suborder: Iguania
- Family: Agamidae
- Genus: Laudakia
- Species: L. agrorensis

Binomial name
- Laudakia agrorensis (Stoliczka, 1872)

Synonyms
- Stellio agrorensis Stoliczka, 1872; Agama agrorensis (Stoliczka, 1872)

Species of lizard

Laudakia agrorensis, the Agror agama, is a species of agamid lizard. It is found in eastern Afghanistan, northwestern India (Punjab, Himachal Pradesh, Jammu, Kashmir), and northern Pakistan. It is associated with rocky outcrops in low mountain areas, 700–1,300 m (2,300–4,300 ft) above sea level.
