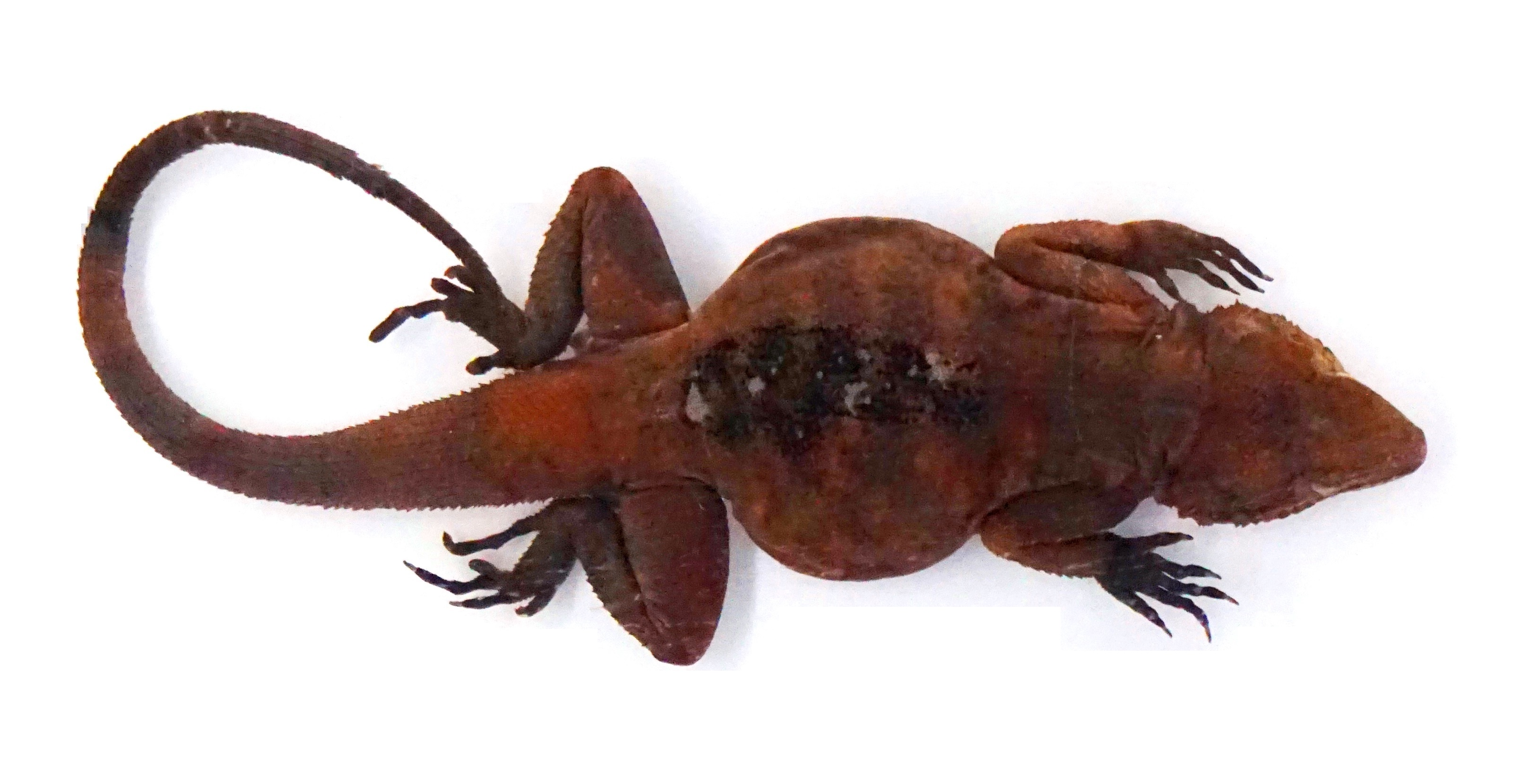

Conservation status
- Least Concern (IUCN 3.1)

Scientific classification
- Kingdom: Animalia
- Phylum: Chordata
- Class: Reptilia
- Order: Squamata
- Suborder: Iguania
- Family: Agamidae
- Genus: Laudakia
- Species: L. sacra

Binomial name
- Laudakia sacra (M.A. Smith, 1935)

Synonyms
- Agama himalayana sacra M.A. Smith, 1935; Stellio sacra — Ananjeva et al., 1990; Laudakia sacra — Macey et al., 2000

= Laudakia sacra =

Anan's rock agama

Species of lizard

Laudakia sacra, also known commonly as Anan's rock agama, is a species of lizard in the family Agamidae. The species is endemic to Tibet.

== Etymology ==
The common name, Anan's rock agama, refers to Russian herpetologist Natalia Borisovna Ananjeva (born 1946).

== Habitat ==
The preferred natural habitats of L. sacra are rocky areas and freshwater wetlands, at altitudes of 3,300–4,400 m (10,800–14,400 ft).

== Description ==
L. sacra may attain a snout-to-vent length (SVL) of 15 cm (5.9 in), plus a tail 24 cm (9.4 in) long.

== Reproduction ==
L. sacra is oviparous.
