= Laudakia wui =

Wui's rock agama

Conservation status
- Least Concern (IUCN 3.1)

Scientific classification
- Kingdom: Animalia
- Phylum: Chordata
- Class: Reptilia
- Order: Squamata
- Suborder: Iguania
- Family: Agamidae
- Genus: Laudakia
- Species: L. wui

Binomial name
- Laudakia wui Zhao, 1998

Species of lizard

Laudakia wui, also known as Wu's rock agama, is a species of agamid lizard. It is found in Tibet.
