= Laudakia nuristanica =

Leviton's rock agama

Conservation status
- Data Deficient (IUCN 3.1)

Scientific classification
- Kingdom: Animalia
- Phylum: Chordata
- Class: Reptilia
- Order: Squamata
- Suborder: Iguania
- Family: Agamidae
- Genus: Laudakia
- Species: L. nuristanica

Binomial name
- Laudakia nuristanica (Anderson & Leviton, 1969)

Synonyms
- Agama nuristanica Anderson & Leviton, 1969; Stellio nuristanicus (Anderson & Leviton, 1969)

Species of lizard

Laudakia nuristanica, also known as Leviton's rock agama, is a species of agamid lizard. It is found in eastern Afghanistan and northwestern Pakistan.
