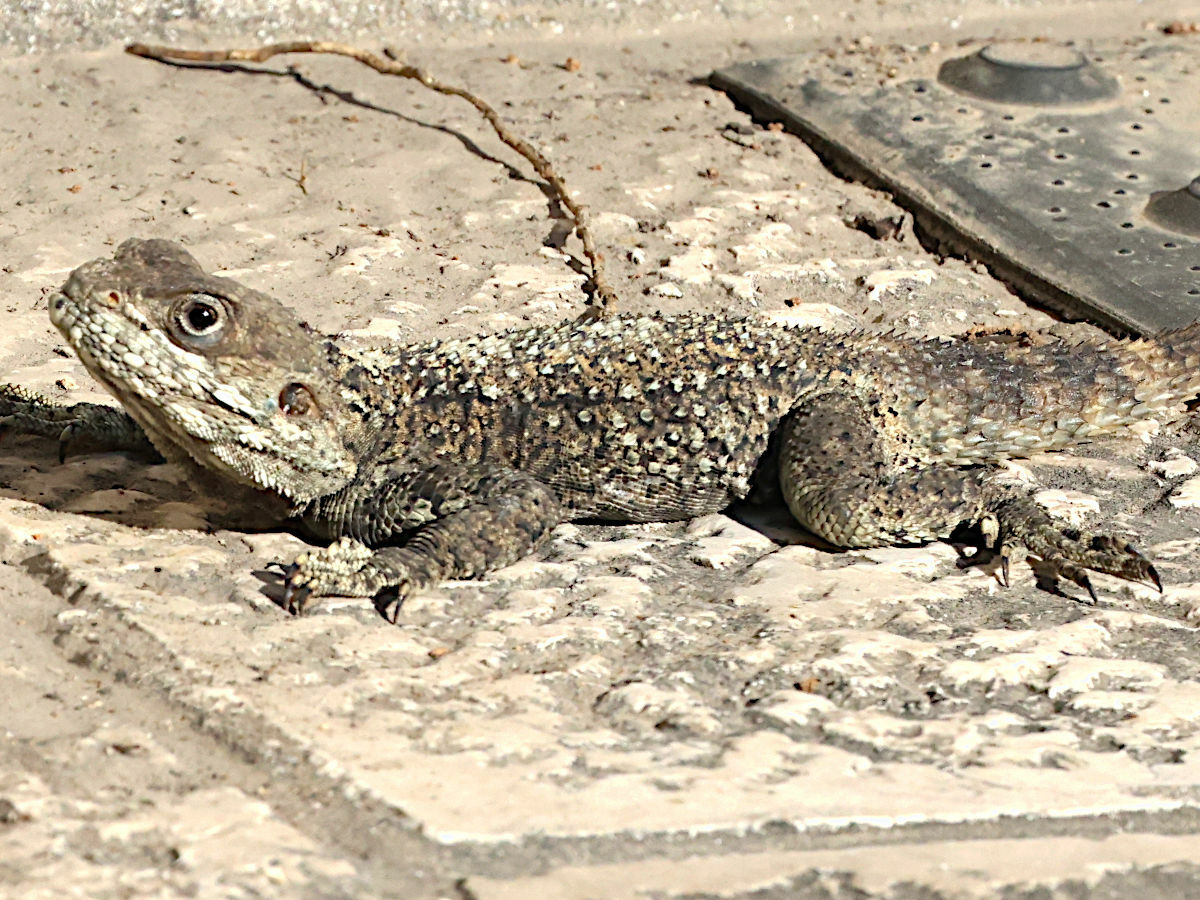

Scientific classification
- Kingdom: Animalia
- Phylum: Chordata
- Class: Reptilia
- Order: Squamata
- Suborder: Iguania
- Family: Agamidae
- Genus: Laudakia
- Species: L. vulgaris

Binomial name
- Laudakia vulgaris (Sonnini & Latreille, 1801)

= Laudakia vulgaris =

Egyptian rock agama

Species of lizard

Laudakia vulgaris, also known as the Egyptian rock agama, is a species of agamid lizard. It is found in Egypt, Jordan, Israel, Syria, southern Lebanon, and northern Saudi Arabia.

== Subspecies ==
The following 3 subspecies, including the nominotypical subspecies, are recognized as being valid.

- Laudakia vulgaris vulgaris (Sonnini & Latreille, 1801)
- Laudakia vulgaris brachydactyla (Haas, 1951): northern Saudi Arabia, southern Israel, Sinai, Jordan
- Laudakia vulgaris picea (Parker, 1935): southwest Syria, southern Lebanon, northern Israel, northwest Jordan
