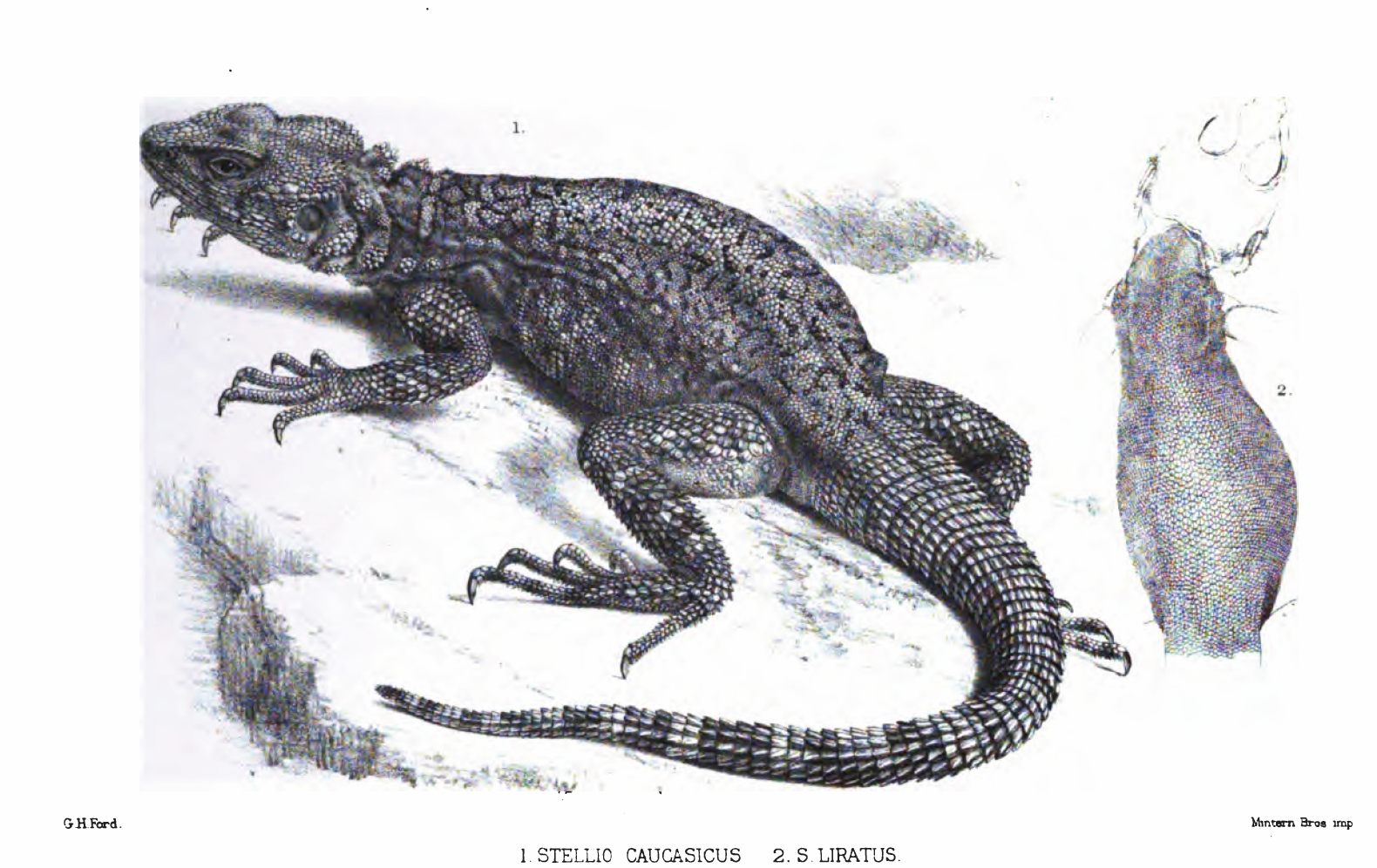

Conservation status
- Least Concern (IUCN 3.1)

Scientific classification
- Kingdom: Animalia
- Phylum: Chordata
- Class: Reptilia
- Order: Squamata
- Suborder: Iguania
- Family: Agamidae
- Genus: Paralaudakia
- Species: P. caucasia

Binomial name
- Paralaudakia caucasia (Eichwald, 1831)

Synonyms
- Stellio caucasicus Laudakia caucasia

= Caucasian agama =

Caucasian Agama

Species of lizard

The Caucasian agama (Paralaudakia caucasia) is a species of agamid lizard found in the Caucasus, E/S Georgia, Armenia, Azerbaijan, Turkmenistan, Tajikistan, Dagestan (Russia), E Turkey, Iraq, N Iran, Afghanistan, NW Pakistan, and parts of Kashmir.

== Description ==
Head much depressed; nostril lateral, below the canthus rostralis, slightly tubular. Upper head-scales smooth; occipital not enlarged; small conical spinose scales on the side of the head near the ear, and on the neck; ear larger than the eye-opening. Throat strongly plicate; no gular pouch. Body much depressed, with a very indistinct lateral fold; nuchal and latero-dorsal scales very small, granular; vertebral region with enlarged flat, feebly keeled, rather irregular scales; flanks with enlarged, strongly keeled or spinose scales; no nuchal denticulation; ventral scales smooth, distinctly smaller than the enlarged dorsals. 150 to 160 scales round the middle of the body. Limbs strong, with compressed digits; the scales on the upper surface of limbs much enlarged, strongly keeled, generally spinose; fourth finger slightly longer than third; fourth toe a little longer than third, fifth extending beyond first. Tail rounded, depressed at the base, covered with rather large spinose scales arranged in rings, two rings forming a distinct segment; the length of the tail doos not equal quite twice the distance from gular fold to vent. Male with a large patch of callose preanal scales and an enormous patch of similar scales on the belly. Olivaceous above, with round yellowish black-edged spots, the black frequently forming a network; vertebral region yellowish, limbs with more or less distinct yellowish cross bars; lower surface yellowish in the female, blackish in the breeding male.

From snout to vent 5 inches.
