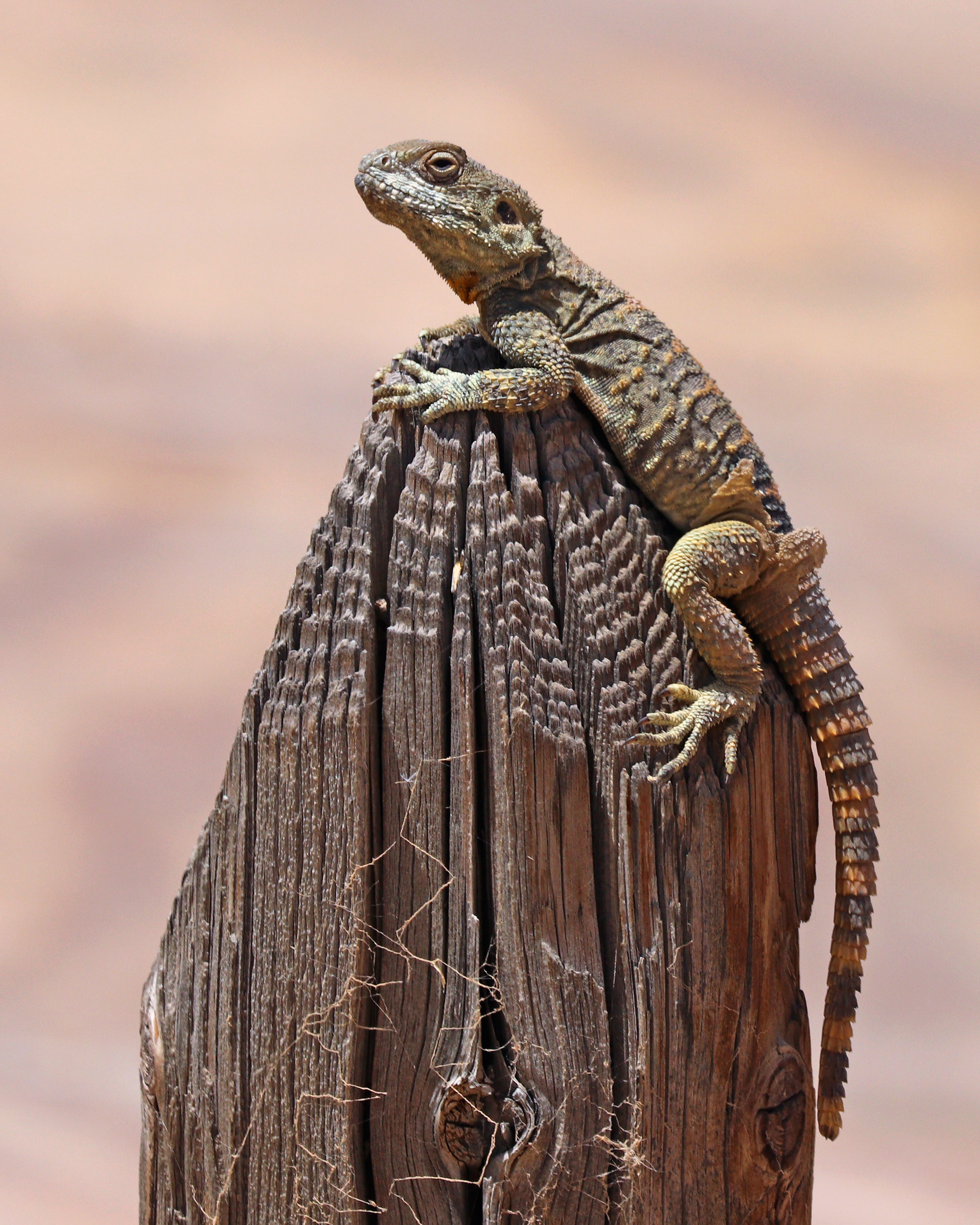
- Dana Biosphere Reserve, Jordan

Conservation status
- Least Concern (IUCN 3.1)

Scientific classification
- Kingdom: Animalia
- Phylum: Chordata
- Class: Reptilia
- Order: Squamata
- Suborder: Iguania
- Family: Agamidae
- Genus: Laudakia
- Species: L. stellio

Binomial name
- Laudakia stellio (Linnaeus, 1758)

Synonyms
- Lacerta stellio Linnaeus, 1758; Agama stellio (Linnaeus, 1758); Stellio stellio (Linnaeus, 1758); Placoderma stellio (Linnaeus, 1758); Stellagama stellio (Linnaeus, 1758)

= Laudakia stellio =

Species of lizard

Laudakia stellio is a species of agamid lizard. also known as the starred agama or the roughtail rock agama.

== Common names ==
Common names for L. stellio include dikenli keler, hardim, hardun, kourkoutas (Cypriot Greek), kourkoutavlos, painted dragon, roughtail rock agama, short-toed rock agama, sling-tailed agama, star lizard, starred agama, and stellion.

== Geographic range ==
Laudakia stellio can be found in Greece and Turkey, the other species in this species complex are recorded elsewhere.

== Description ==
Laudakia stellio may attain a total length (including tail) of 35 cm (14 in) or slightly longer.

== Behaviour and habitat ==
Like many agamids, L. stellio can change its color to express its mood. It basks on stone walls, rocks, and trees. It is usually found in rocky habitats, and is quite shy, being very ready to dive into cracks to hide from potential predators.

== Etymology ==
The common name "stellion" comes from Latin stellio, stēlio (stelliōn-, stēliōn-), from stella, star. It may have referred to any spotted lizard.

== Mythology ==
Stellio is mentioned in Ovids Metamorphoses Book 5 line 461. A naughty boy mocks the goddess Ceres for drinking a drink containing honey and barley with too much greed, as she is quite thirsty. Angrily the goddess throws the drink in the face of the boy, and there by changes him into a Stellio or a starred agama. It is an etiological myth explaining how the starred agama got its spotted skin.

== Uses ==
For the indigenous people of Europe, and perhaps the Middle East, traditionally the excrement of the stellio was a popular medicine for the eyes, also used as a cosmetic, known as cordylea, crocodilea or stercus lacerti (i.e. 'lizard shit'), the faeces being imported to European pharmacies from the Levant – a rarer and more potent form was acquired from monitor lizards in olden days (stercus magni lacerti). The dung was used to improve one's eyesight, as well as take away any itches and cure cataracts (webbe).

== Subspecies ==
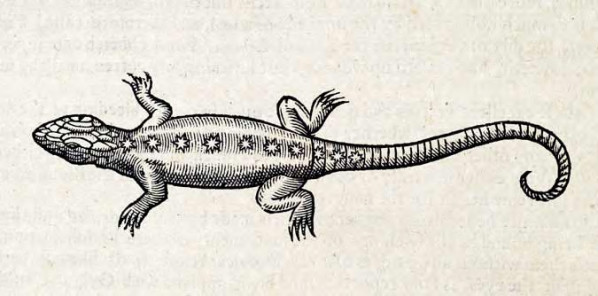
Stellion

The following 2 subspecies, including the nominotypical subspecies, are recognized as being valid.

- Laudakia stellio daani (Beutler & Frör, 1980)
- Laudakia stellio stellio (Linnaeus, 1758)

Nota bene: A trinomial authority in parentheses indicates that the subspecies was originally described in a genus other than Laudakia.
