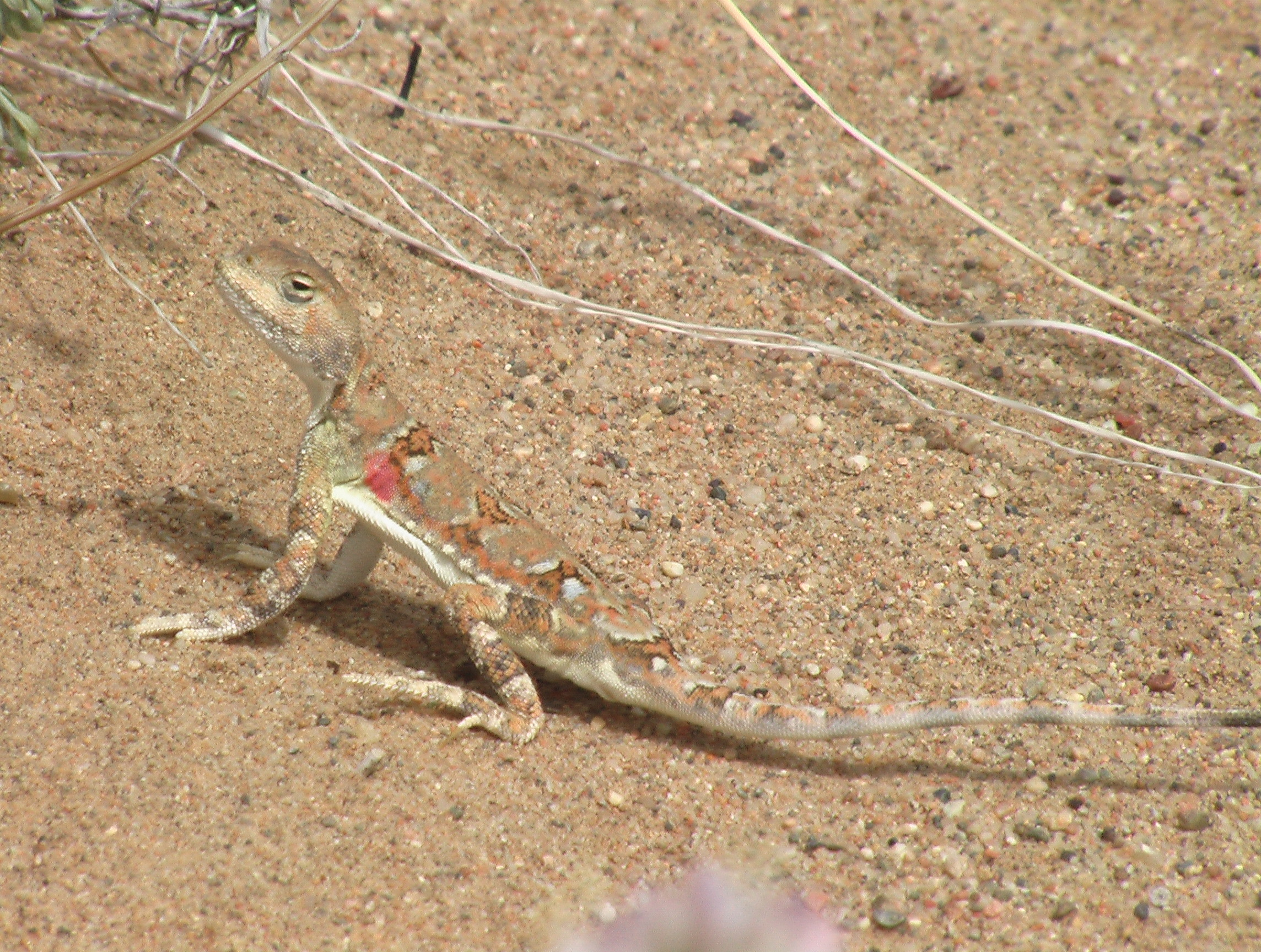

Conservation status
- Least Concern (IUCN 3.1)

Scientific classification
- Kingdom: Animalia
- Phylum: Chordata
- Class: Reptilia
- Order: Squamata
- Suborder: Iguania
- Family: Agamidae
- Genus: Phrynocephalus
- Species: P. versicolor

Binomial name
- Phrynocephalus versicolor Strauch, 1876
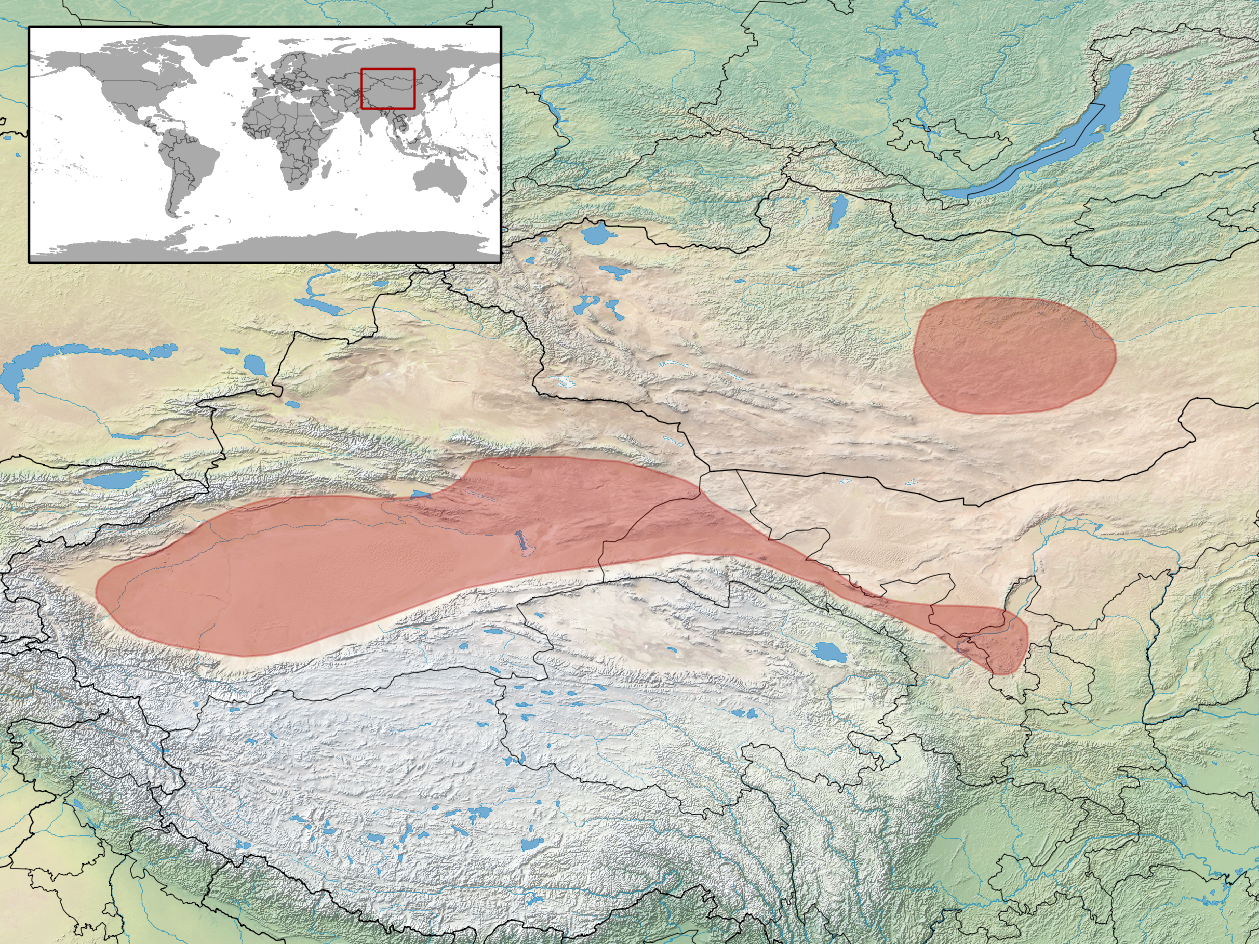
- Range of Phrynocephalus versicolor

= Phrynocephalus versicolor =

Species of lizard

Phrynocephalus versicolor, the Tuvan toad-headed agama, is a species of agamid lizard found in desert areas of China and Mongolia. It was first described by the Russian herpetologist Alexander Strauch, director of the Zoological Museum at the Imperial Academy of Sciences at St. Petersburg.

== Subspecies ==
Three subspecies, including the nominate one, are recognized:

- Phrynocephalus versicolor doriai Bedriaga 1909
- Phrynocephalus versicolor siebenrocki Bedriaga 1909
- Phrynocephalus versicolor versicolor Strauch 1876

== Description ==
Phrynocephalus versicolor grows to a length of about 13 cm (5 in) including the tail, which is longer than the combined head and body. The head is large and rounded and the blunt snout has an oblique profile which makes the nostrils easily visible from above. There is no transverse fold of skin across the shoulders. There are large scales which are smooth and unribbed along the spine. Other dorsal scales are thickened with their rear margin slightly raised, which gives the lizard a rough appearance. Scales on the ventral surface are extended into short spines. The tail is long and tapering, flattened at the base and cylindrical further from the body. It is thickened at the base in the male. The colour is variable. The dorsal surface of the body is olive or leaden-grey with two to five transverse bars of brownish-black, the most intense colour being just behind the shoulders and there is often an orange patch in the armpit. The legs are also banded with darker colour and the underparts are white. The tail has up to nine dark bars, some of them extending to the underside, and the tip is black underneath.

== Distribution and habitat ==
Phrynocephalus versicolor occurs in Mongolia and in the provinces of Xinjiang, Gansu, Ningxia, and Nei Mongol in China. It is found on stony plains and slopes, in canyons and on sand dunes with sagebrush and other sparse scrubby vegetation. Much of its habitat is more than 3,200 m (10,500 ft) above sea level and the temperature can vary from −30 °C (−22 °F) in the winter to 40 °C (104 °F) in the summer. There is very little precipitation, and the small amount of rainfall is concentrated in mid-summer.

== Biology ==
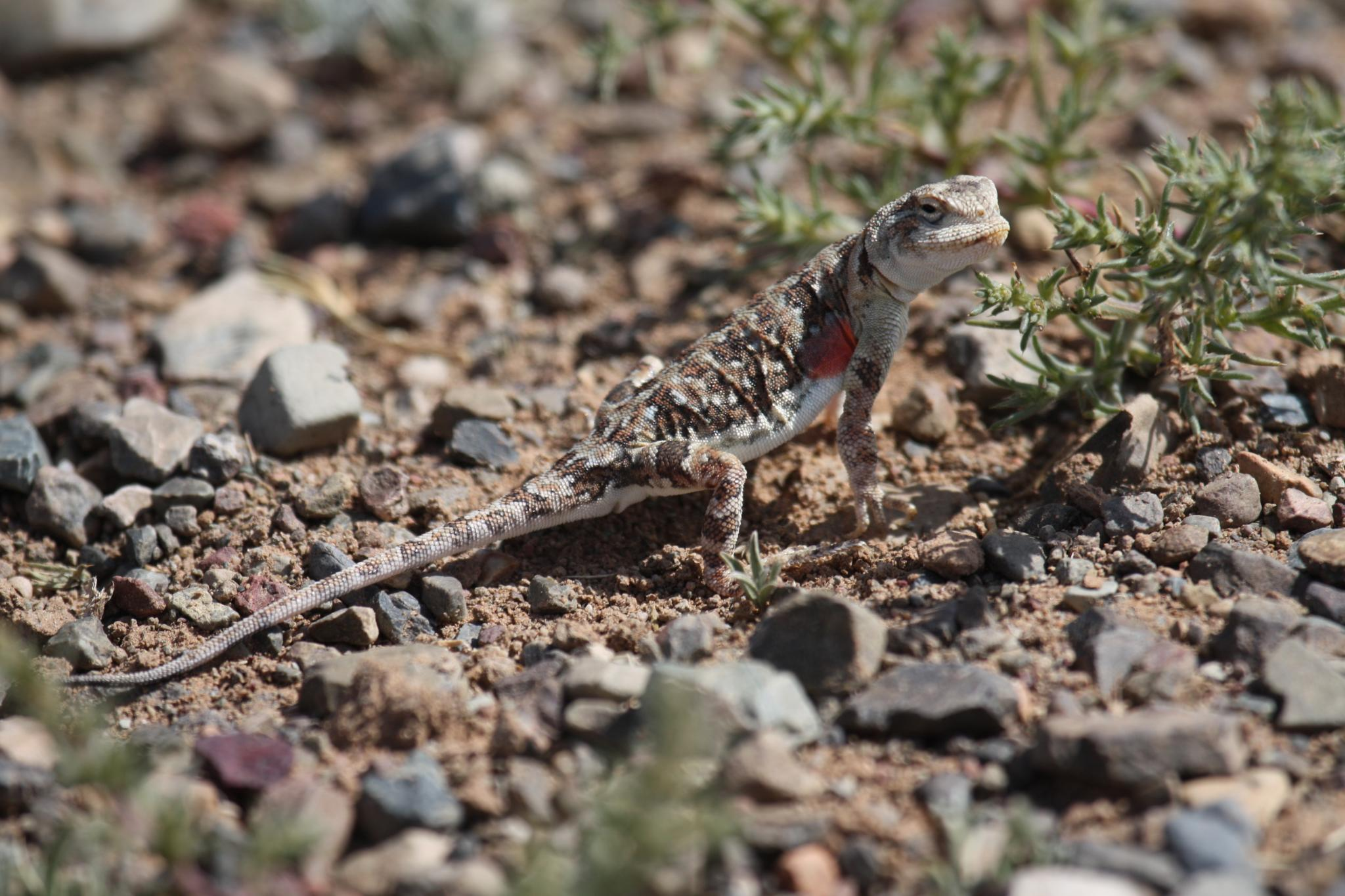
Well-camouflaged and alert

Phrynocephalus versicolor hibernates during the winter and is active between March and the end of September. During summer it remains in its burrow during the cold nights and midday heat. The burrow is unbranched, has a single entrance and ends in a chamber some 10 to 13 cm (4 to 5 in) beneath the surface of the ground. This lizard feeds on small invertebrates such as ants, flies, grasshoppers and ground beetles. When rain falls, it stands with its hind legs straightened, its front legs bent and its head lowered, so that water landing on its back trickles towards its mouth.

A female becomes sexually mature when about 9 cm (3.5 in) long. In the rainy season she digs a hole in damp ground some 5 cm (2 in) deep in which she lays a clutch of up to five white or pink-tinged eggs. Incubation takes about thirty days and the young are about 5 cm (2 in) long when they hatch. They exhibit great diversity in colour and adopt a stance similar to that of adults when rain is falling.

== Status ==
Phrynocephalus versicolor has a wide range and is common in its arid habitats. The population is stable and no particular threats have been identified so the International Union for Conservation of Nature has assessed its status as being of "least concern".
