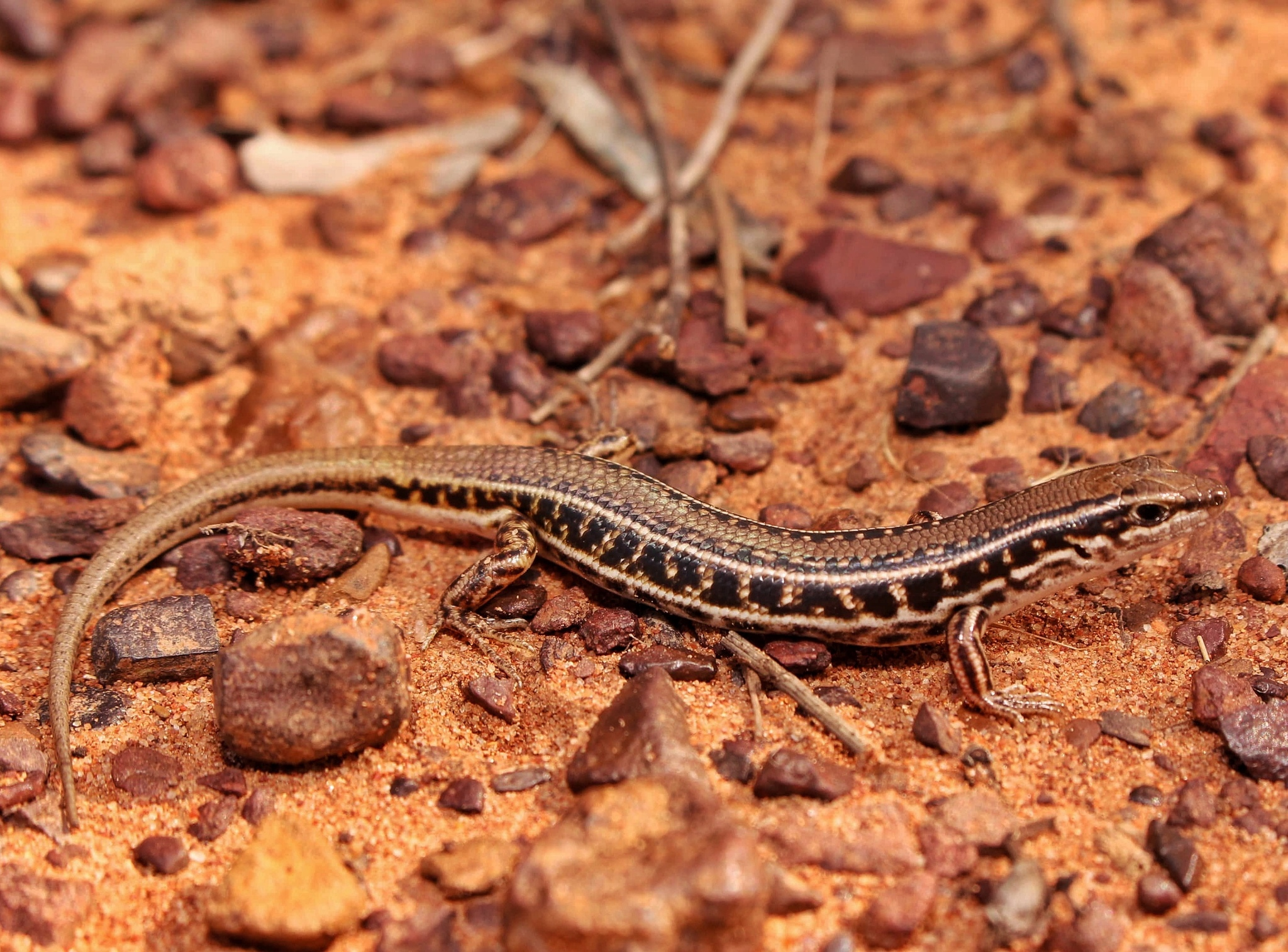

Conservation status
- Least Concern (IUCN 3.1)

Scientific classification
- Kingdom: Animalia
- Phylum: Chordata
- Class: Reptilia
- Order: Squamata
- Family: Scincidae
- Genus: Ctenotus
- Species: C. allotropis

Binomial name
- Ctenotus allotropis Storr, 1981
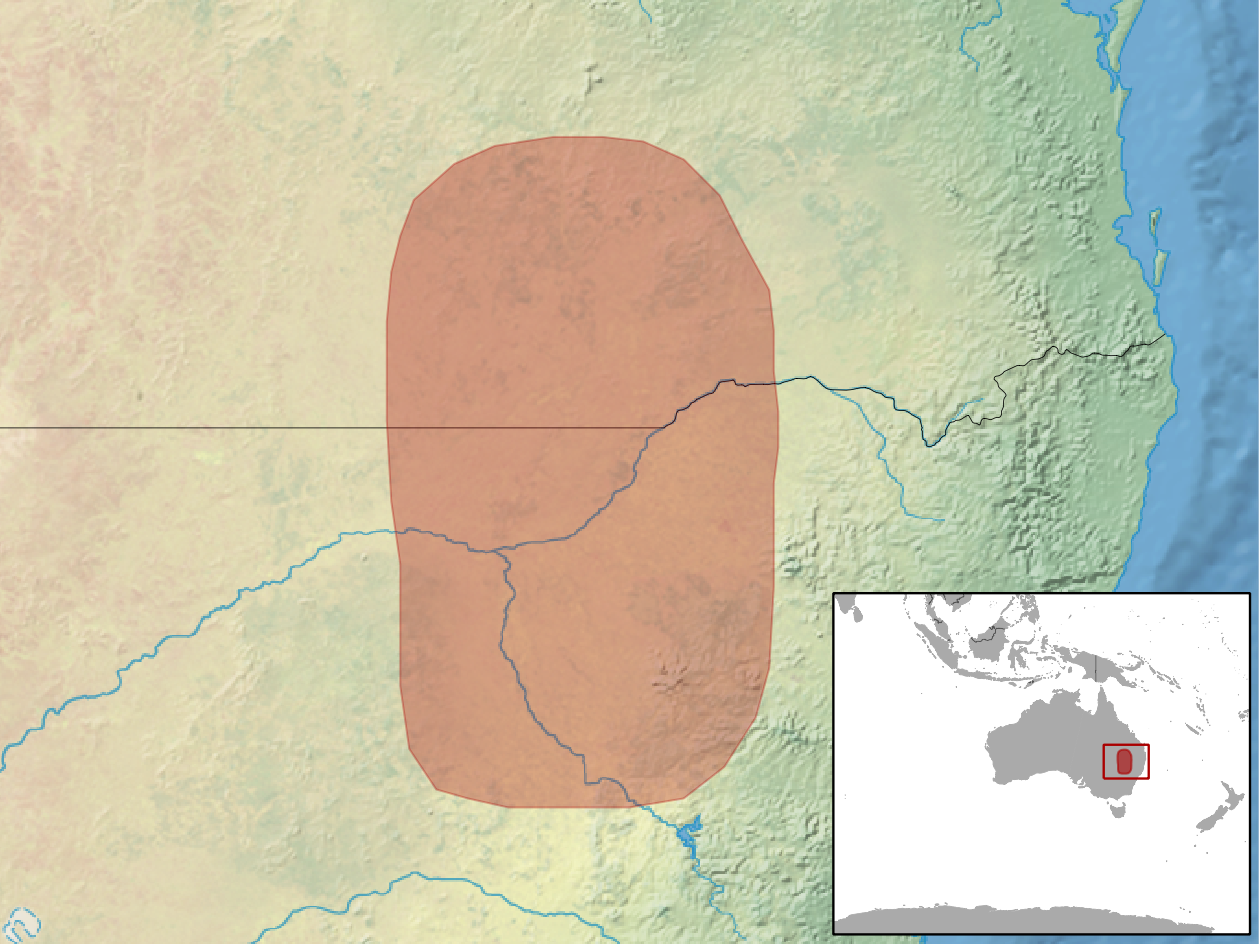

= Ctenotus allotropis =

Species of lizard

Ctenotus allotropis, the brown-blazed wedgesnout ctenotus, is a species of skink found in New South Wales and Queensland in Australia.

== Description ==
C. allotropis has many similarities to the eastern barred wedgesnout ctenotus C. strauchii. They are a moderate-sized, active, diurnal lizards with long, slender, pentadactyle limbs. They are characterised by the common Ctenotus features being: conspicuous anterior ear lobules, a colour pattern which usually consists of dorsal and lateral longitudinal stripes, smooth or faintly keeled scales, the absence of supranasal scales, and a scaly movable lower eyelid. They can vary from a reddish brown to chocolate brown and they commonly lack a vertebral stripe. C. allotropis has a narrow white dorso-lateral stripe that starts above the eye and continues to the base of its tail. C. allotropis have 24–32 mid-body scale rows, they have 4 supraoculars and between 7 and 8 supralabials. They have small ear lobules, there is lamellae present under the fourth toe.

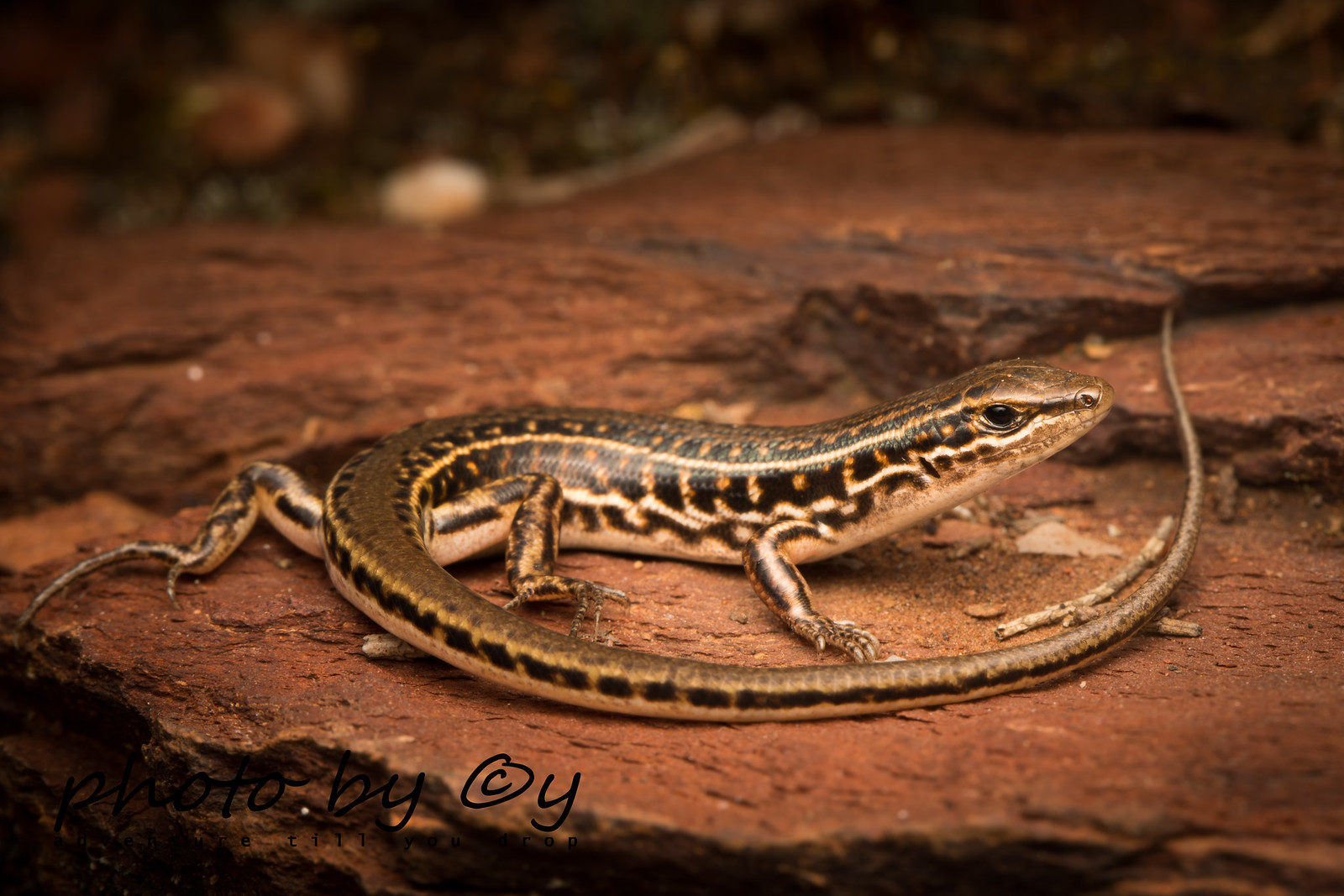
Courtesy of Peter Soltys https://www.flickr.com/photos/143833901@N04/29641691013/in/photolist-MK3ukg-Makq3a

== Habitat, diet and reproduction ==
C. allotropis is an oviparous species which primarily lives in desert regions such as the Yathong Nature Reserve and tropical woodlands of central North Western Australia. It forages among leaf and other litter, especially around the bases of trees. It is a terrestrial species therefore is generally active at very high temperatures. C. allotropis are opportunistic feeders, their diet primarily being a variety of insects and other arthropods.

== Threats ==
- Fragmentation, resulting from clearing or degradation of habitat, may reduce the size of populations and increase the extent to which they are isolated. Small, isolated populations have a greater risk of extinction due to genetic effects and chance events (e.g., drought and fire).
- Degradation of the habitat, a result of inappropriate grazing or fire regimes, may result in changes to the physical and biological nature of the habitat (e.g., changes in the structure and floristics of vegetation, diversity and abundance of invertebrates). These changes may render habitat unsuitable or increase the risk posed by other threatening processes (e.g., predation).
- Fire may cause the direct loss of individuals.
- Predation by foxes or cats, particularly where populations have already declined.
- Catastrophic events such as drought or extensive wildfire.
- Anthropogenic climate change is a long term threat as it may alter habitat characteristics (e.g., change in physical structure or productivity) such that its capacity to support viable populations is reduced.
- Insufficient understanding of species distribution and abundance

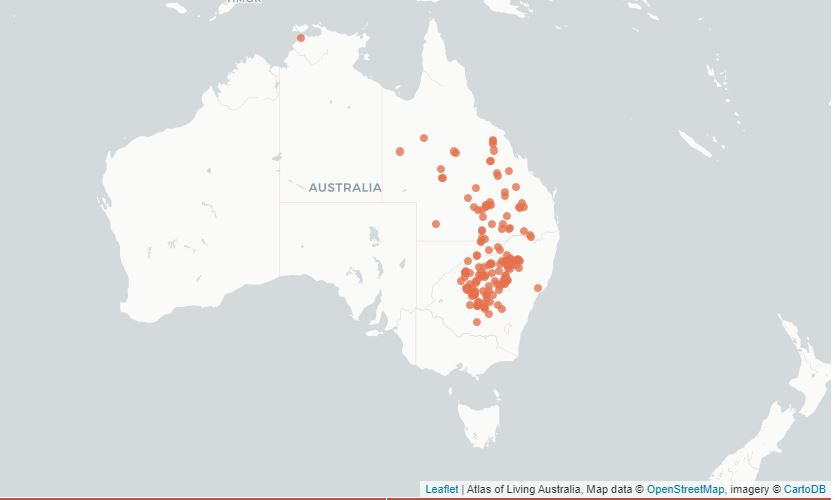
The recorded locations in Australia of the brown blazed wedgesnout ctenotus
