= Phrynocephalus przewalskii =

Conservation status
- Least Concern (IUCN 3.1)

Scientific classification
- Kingdom: Animalia
- Phylum: Chordata
- Class: Reptilia
- Order: Squamata
- Suborder: Iguania
- Family: Agamidae
- Genus: Phrynocephalus
- Species: P. przewalskii

Binomial name
- Phrynocephalus przewalskii Strauch, 1876
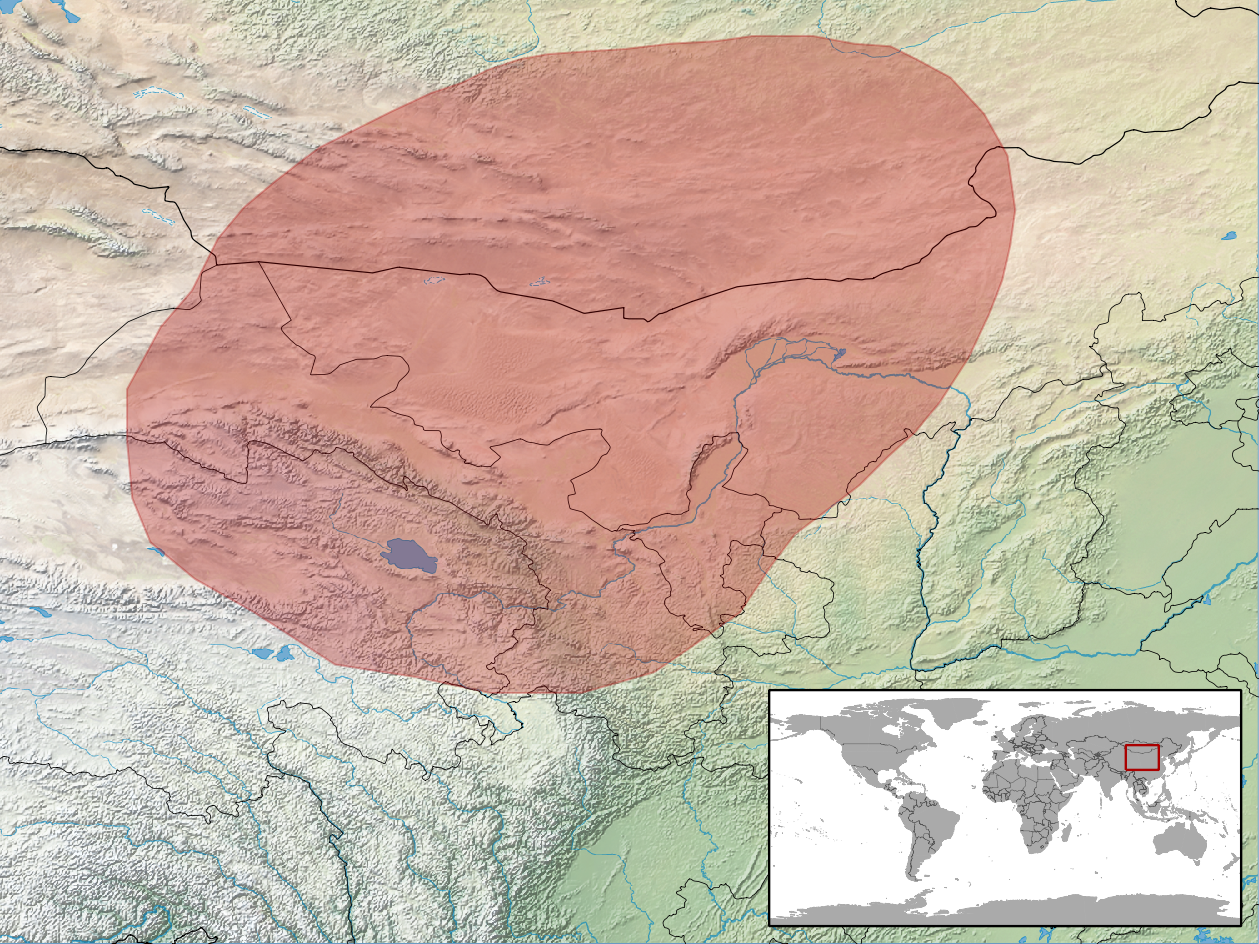

Species of lizard

Przewalski's toadhead agama (Phrynocephalus przewalskii), also known as Tsarewsky's toadhead agama, or Steindachner's toadhead agama, is a species of agamid lizard found in China and Mongolia. This species was named after Nikolay Przhevalsky, a Russian Imperial geographer and explorer of Central and East Asia.

== Description ==
P. przewalkskii is one of the 44 recognized species within the genus Phrynocephalus. Adults may attain a snout-to-vent length (SVL) of about 61 mm (2.4 in) and weigh 7.2g on average. It sports a sand or gray colored body with a white underside. Sparse black specks or small spots are present on their head and body. Some individuals have denser spotting on the tops of their heads as well as a black stripe down the middle of their back. This pattern is more pronounced in adult males of the species.

== Distribution and habitat ==
It is most common in desert habitats of northwestern China, but specimens have also been spotted in Mongolia. It appears to prefer habitats with low moisture and high vegetation cover.

== Behavior ==
Przewalski's toadhead agamas are diurnal. They are insectivores and females lay 1–7 eggs per clutch.
