= Phrynocephalus putjatai =

Conservation status
- Least Concern (IUCN 3.1)

Scientific classification
- Kingdom: Animalia
- Phylum: Chordata
- Class: Reptilia
- Order: Squamata
- Suborder: Iguania
- Family: Agamidae
- Genus: Phrynocephalus
- Species: P. putjatai

Binomial name
- Phrynocephalus putjatai Bedriaga, 1909

Species of lizard

Phrynocephalus putjatai is a species of agamid lizard found in China.
