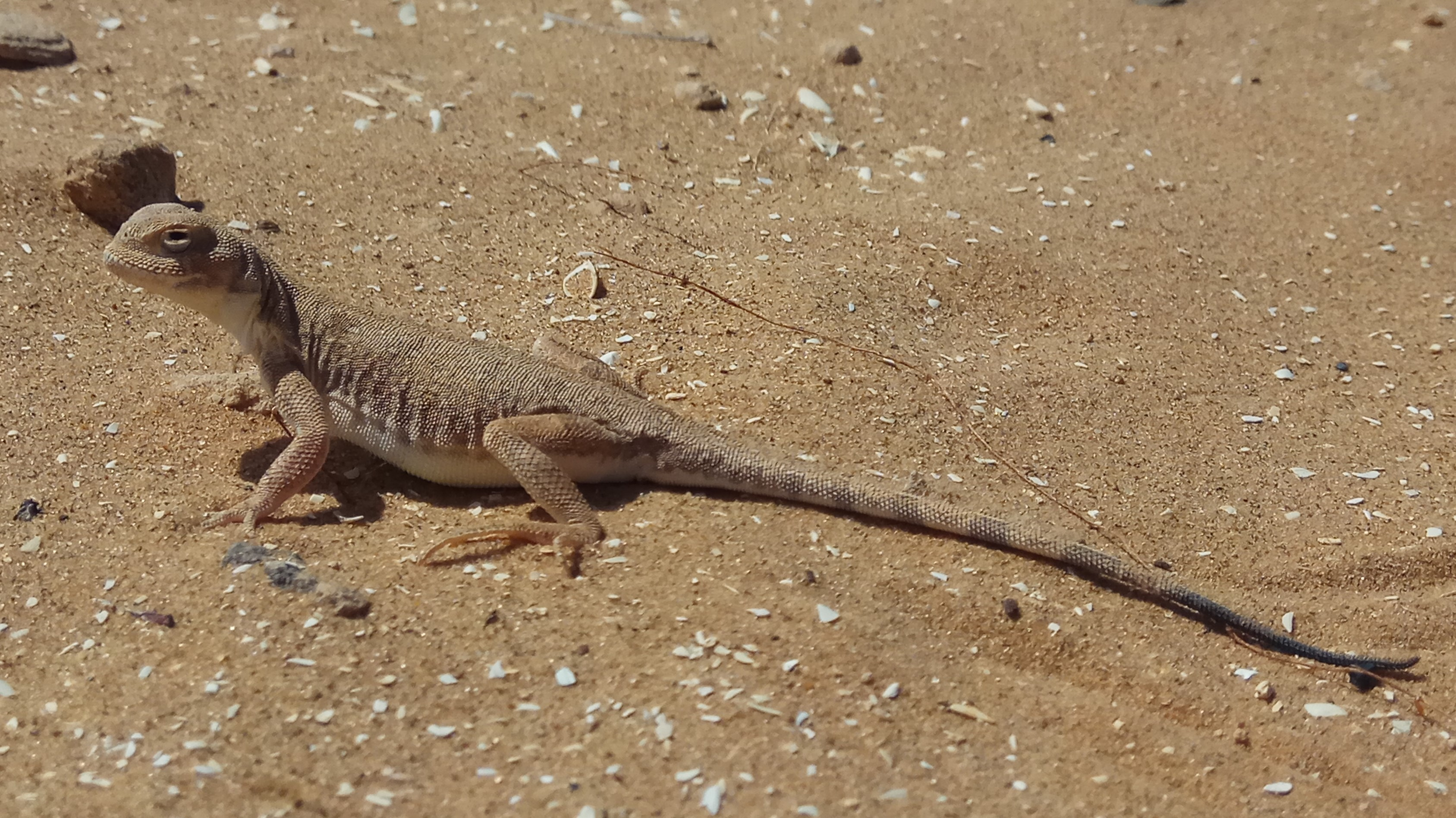
- Central Asian toadhead agama in Kalmykia desert

Conservation status
- Least Concern (IUCN 3.1)

Scientific classification
- Kingdom: Animalia
- Phylum: Chordata
- Class: Reptilia
- Order: Squamata
- Suborder: Iguania
- Family: Agamidae
- Genus: Phrynocephalus
- Species: P. guttatus

Binomial name
- Phrynocephalus guttatus (Gmelin, 1789)

Synonyms
- Lacerta guttata Gmelin, 1789; Agama guttata — Daudin, 1802; Phrynocephalus guttatus — Kaup, 1827

= Phrynocephalus guttatus =

Species of lizard

Phrynocephalus guttatus, also known commonly as the spotted toadhead agama, the Saissan toad-headed agama, the Central Asian toadhead agama, and Salensky's toadhead agama, is a species of lizard in the family Agamidae. The species is native to southeastern Europe and western Asia. There are five recognized subspecies.

== Geographic range ==
Phrynocephalus guttatus is found in Kazakhstan, southern Russia, Turkmenistan, and Uzbekistan.

== Habitat ==
The preferred natural habitat of Phrynocephalus guttatus is desert, at altitudes from 16 m (52 ft) below sea level to 1,000 m (3,300 ft).

== Reproduction ==
Phrynocephalus guttatus is oviparous.

== Subspecies ==
Five subspecies are recognized as being valid, including the nominotypical subspecies.

- Phrynocephalus guttatus alpherakii Bedriaga, 1906
- Phrynocephalus guttatus guttatus (Gmelin, 1789)
- Phrynocephalus guttatus melanurus Eichwald, 1831 – Saissan toad-headed agama
- Phrynocephalus guttatus moltschanowi Nikolsky, 1913
- Phrynocephalus guttatus salsatus Gorelov, Dunayev & Kotenko, 1995

Nota bene: A trinomial authority in parentheses indicates that the subspecies was originally described in a genus other than Phrynocephalus.

== Etymology ==
The subspecific name, moltschanowi, is in honor of Russian ornithologist L.A. Molchanov who collected natural history specimens in the Crimea from 1903 to 1933.
