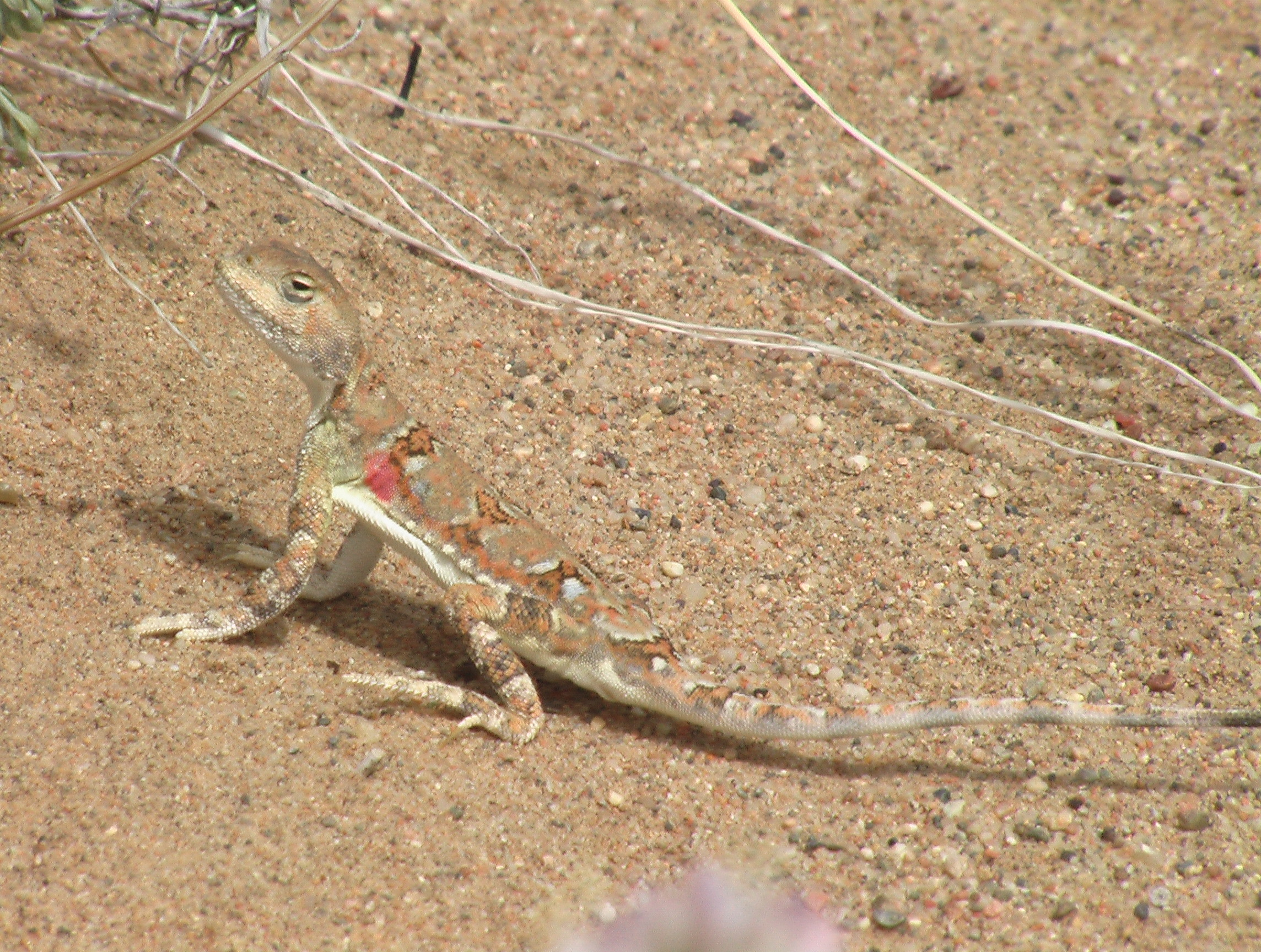
- Phrynocephalus versicolor in Bayankhongor Province, Mongolia

Scientific classification
- Kingdom: Animalia
- Phylum: Chordata
- Class: Reptilia
- Order: Squamata
- Suborder: Iguania
- Family: Agamidae
- Subfamily: Agaminae
- Genus: Phrynocephalus; Kaup, 1825

Species
- 36 species, see text.

= Phrynocephalus =

Genus of lizards

Phrynocephalus is a genus which includes 36 species of small and medium-sized agamid lizards, commonly called toadhead agamas or toad-headed agamas, that inhabit open arid and semiarid environments of Asia and Eastern Europe. The systematics of this genus are very complicated with many controversial points of view about the unclear phylogeny of this group. All representatives of this genus have adopted the so-called "sit and wait" hunting strategy, and they actively use visual orientation when watching for food. In general, the ecological niche and role of Phrynocephalus species in lizard communities of arid environments of Asia are poorly studied but seem to be similar to those of Phrynosoma, Cophosaurus, Holbrookia, Uta, and Sceloporus in the New World, as well as Moloch in Australia.

== Species ==
The following 36 species are recognized as being valid.

- Phrynocephalus ananjevae Melnikov et al., 2013 – Natalie's toadhead agama
- Phrynocephalus arabicus J. Anderson, 1894 – Arabian toadhead agama
- Phrynocephalus axillaris Blanford, 1875 – Yarkand toadhead agama
- Phrynocephalus clarkorum S.C. Anderson & Leviton, 1967 – Afghan toadhead agama
- Phrynocephalus erythrurus Zugmayer, 1909 – Sagus Kul lizard
- Phrynocephalus euptilopus Alcock & Finn, 1897 – Alcock's toadhead agama
- Phrynocephalus forsythii J. Anderson, 1872 – Forsyth's toadhead agama
- Phrynocephalus frontalis Strauch, 1876 – Shansi toadhead agama
- Phrynocephalus golubewii Shenbrot & Semyonov, 1990
- Phrynocephalus guttatus (Gmelin, 1789) – spotted toadhead agama
- Phrynocephalus helioscopus (Pallas, 1771) – sunwatcher toadhead agama
- Phrynocephalus hispidus Bedriaga, 1909 – Dzhungar variegated toadhead agama
- Phrynocephalus horvathi Méhely, 1909 – Horvath's toadhead agama
- Phrynocephalus interscapularis Lichtenstein & Martens, 1856 – Lichtenstein's toadhead agama
- Phrynocephalus kangsuensis Liang & Shi, 2024
- Phrynocephalus kulagini Bedriaga, 1909 – Kulagin's variegated toadhead agama
- Phrynocephalus lutensis Kamali & S.C. Anderson, 2015 – Lut Desert toadhead agama
- Phrynocephalus luteoguttatus Boulenger, 1887 – yellow-speckled toadhead agama
- Phrynocephalus maculatus J. Anderson, 1872 – blacktail toadhead agama
- Phrynocephalus meridionalis (Dunayev, Solovyeva, & Poyarkov, 2012) – sunwatcher toadhead agama; Fergana toad-headed agama
- Phrynocephalus mystaceus (Pallas, 1776) – secret toadhead agama

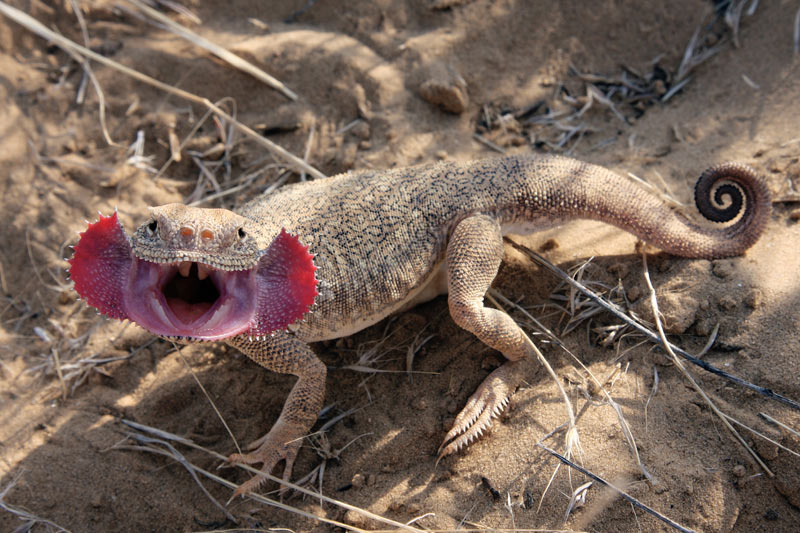
Phrynocephalus mystaceus in Astrakhan Oblast, Russia.

- Phrynocephalus ornatus Boulenger, 1887
- Phrynocephalus persicus De Filippi, 1863 – Persian toadhead agama
- Phrynocephalus przewalskii Strauch, 1876 – Przewalski's toadhead agama
- Phrynocephalus putjatai Bedriaga, 1909
- Phrynocephalus raddei Boettger, 1888
- Phrynocephalus reticulatus Eichwald, 1831 – reticulated toadhead agama
- Phrynocephalus roborowskii Bedriaga, 1906 – Roborowski's toadhead agama
- Phrynocephalus rossikowi Nikolsky, 1898 – Uzbekistan toadhead agama
- Phrynocephalus saidalievi (Sattorov, 1981) – Fergana toad-headed agama
- Phrynocephalus sakoi Melnikov et al., 2015
- Phrynocephalus scutellatus (Olivier, 1807) – gray toadhead agama
- Phrynocephalus strauchi Nikolsky, 1899 – Strauch's toadhead agama
- Phrynocephalus theobaldi Blyth, 1963 – Theobald's toadhead agama, toad-headed lizard, or snow lizard
- Phrynocephalus versicolor Strauch, 1876 – Tuvan toadhead agama
- Phrynocephalus vindumi Golubev, 1998
- Phrynocephalus vlangalii Strauch, 1876 – Ching Hai toadhead agama

Nota bene: A binomial authority in parentheses indicates that the species was originally described in a genus other than Phrynocephalus.
