= Phrynocephalus axillaris =

Conservation status
- Least Concern (IUCN 3.1)

Scientific classification
- Kingdom: Animalia
- Phylum: Chordata
- Class: Reptilia
- Order: Squamata
- Suborder: Iguania
- Family: Agamidae
- Genus: Phrynocephalus
- Species: P. axillaris

Binomial name
- Phrynocephalus axillaris Blanford, 1875
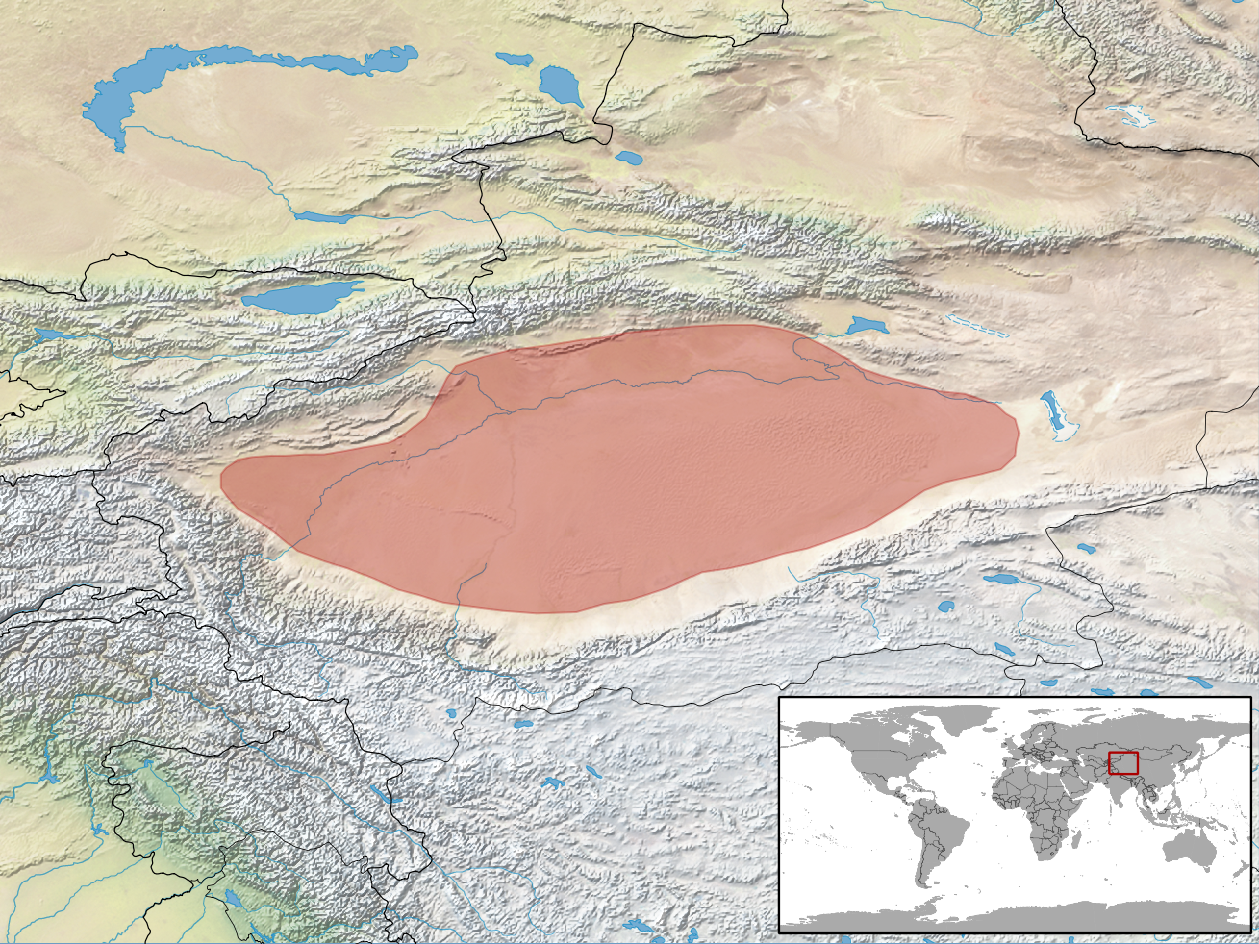

Synonyms
- Phrynocephalus koslovi Bedriaga, 1906; Phrynocephalus ludovici Mocquard, 1910; Phrynocephalus nasatus Golubev & Dunayev, 1995

Species of lizard

Phrynocephalus axillaris, also known commonly as the Yarkand toadhead agama and the Yarkand toad-headed agama, is a species of lizard in the subfamily Agaminae of the family Agamidae. The species is native to China, Mongolia, Tibet, and Turkestan.

== Habitat ==
The preferred natural habitat of Phrynosoma axillaris is desert, at altitudes of 100–3,200 m (330–10,500 ft).

== Reproduction ==
Phrynocephalus axillaris is oviparous. Clutch size is two to five eggs.

== Etymology ==
The specific name of a junior synonymy, ludovici (meaning "of Louis" in Latin), is in honor of French zoologist Léon Louis Vaillant.
