= Spotted ctenotus =

There are two species of skink named spotted ctenotus. Spotted ctenotus may refer to:

- Ctenotus olympicus, found in Australia
- Ctenotus uber, found in Western Australia
