= Phrynocephalus kulagini =

Scientific classification
- Domain: Eukaryota
- Kingdom: Animalia
- Phylum: Chordata
- Class: Reptilia
- Order: Squamata
- Suborder: Iguania
- Family: Agamidae
- Genus: Phrynocephalus
- Species: P. kulagini

Binomial name
- Phrynocephalus kulagini Bedriaga, 1909

Species of lizard

Phrynocephalus kulagini, Kulagin's variegated toadhead agama, is a species of agamid lizard found in Mongolia and Russia.
