= Phrynocephalus frontalis =

Conservation status
- Least Concern (IUCN 3.1)

Scientific classification
- Kingdom: Animalia
- Phylum: Chordata
- Class: Reptilia
- Order: Squamata
- Suborder: Iguania
- Family: Agamidae
- Genus: Phrynocephalus
- Species: P. frontalis

Binomial name
- Phrynocephalus frontalis Strauch, 1876

Species of lizard

Phrynocephalus frontalis, the Shansi toadhead agama, is a species of agamid lizard endemic to China.
