= Phrynocephalus roborowskii =

Scientific classification
- Domain: Eukaryota
- Kingdom: Animalia
- Phylum: Chordata
- Class: Reptilia
- Order: Squamata
- Suborder: Iguania
- Family: Agamidae
- Genus: Phrynocephalus
- Species: P. roborowskii

Binomial name
- Phrynocephalus roborowskii Bedriaga, 1906

Species of lizard

Phrynocephalus roborowskii, Roborowski's toadhead agama, is a species of agamid lizard found in China.
