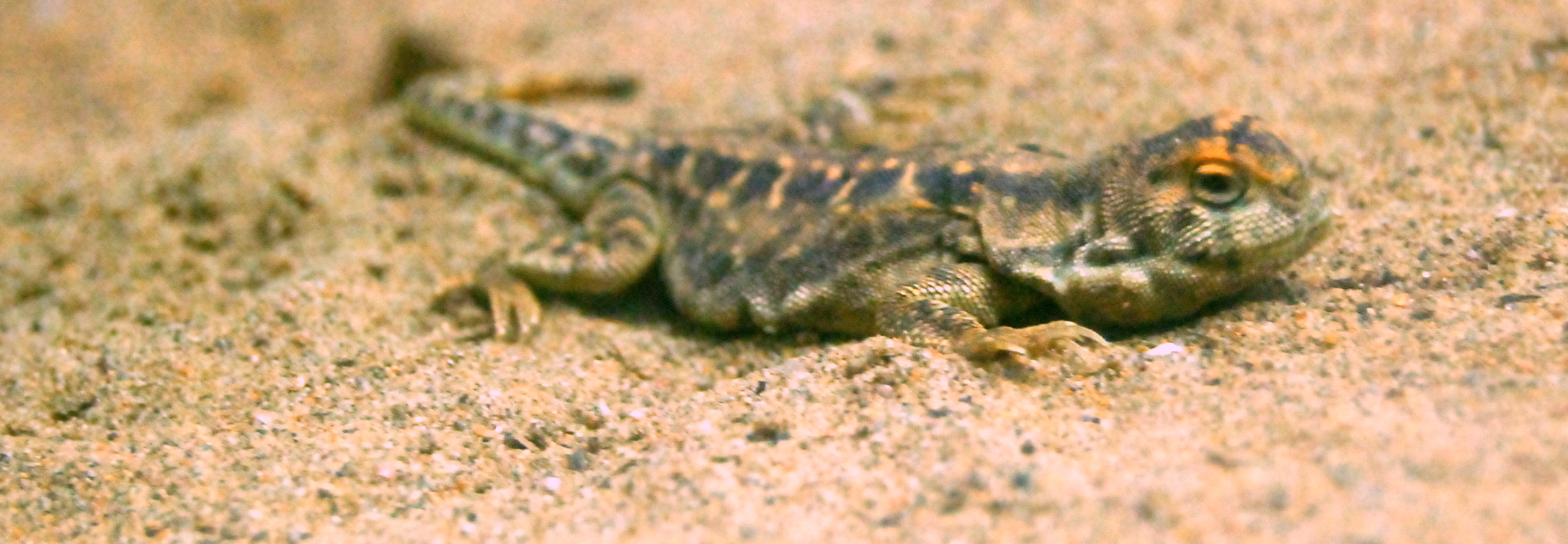

Conservation status
- Least Concern (IUCN 3.1)

Scientific classification
- Kingdom: Animalia
- Phylum: Chordata
- Order: Squamata
- Suborder: Iguania
- Family: Agamidae
- Genus: Phrynocephalus
- Species: P. vlangalii

Binomial name
- Phrynocephalus vlangalii Strauch, 1876

= Phrynocephalus vlangalii =

Species of reptile

Phrynocephalus vlangalii, also known as the Qinghai toad-headed agama, the Ching Hai toadhead agama, the Pylzow's toadhead agama, or gecko toadhead agama, is a species of viviparous agamid lizard endemic to the Tibetan Plateau in China. This lizard lives in burrows at high elevations of 2,000 to 4,600 meters. It is also known for its aggression, especially between females during mating season since females usually only have one mate. P. vlangalii curls its tail and shows a patch on its underbelly as defense displays against conspecifics. This lizard also has a variety of gut microbiota that help perform metabolic and biological functions depending on the altitude at which the lizard lives.

== Description ==
As a small lizard, P. vlangalii can grow up to 80 mm from snout to vent. Sexual dimorphism is present in this species and most evident among adults. Adult males tend to have larger heads and tail lengths while adult females have larger bodies and abdomen lengths. Males and females are also distinguishable by their tail-tip badges: males have black tail-tips and females have orange tail-tips. Both males and females display their tail-tip badges and underbelly patches as a method of defending their territory against rival lizards. There is a positive correlation between a lizard's body size and temperature, air pressure, and active season length, demonstrated by differences in the body size of P. vlangalii among different elevations in the Tibetan plateau. This is because as the elevation increases, air temperature and pressure decrease. To avoid hypoxia, or lack of oxygen to the body, these lizards have smaller bodies to help maintain a constant body temperature.

== Habitat and Distribution ==
P. vlangalii creates burrows about 70 cm into sand to act as refuge against predators. Burrows greater than 74 cm are deep enough to protect against low temperatures. Because P. vlangalii is found on a plateau, it is adapted to an arid and semi-arid environment with sparse vegetation located 2000–4600 meters high. P. vlangalii's preference for desert habitats makes it a good indicator species for desertification of grassland areas. This lizard is endemic to the Qinghai-Tibetan Plateau in China. The Tibetan plateau is known for its high altitude, cold temperatures, and dry atmosphere, which explains the lizard's burrow digging behavior. P. vlangalii's range can also stretch north to the southern Arjin mountains and the Gansu province in China. Its southern range reaches the northern Tanggula mountains and the southern part of the Yellow River.

=== Habitat Loss ===
P. vlangalii is one of the most common lizard species in its native range but its habitat is experiencing some loss for a variety of reasons. In central and southwestern Mongolia, as well as other parts of Asia, P. vlangalii is losing parts of its habitat to both human interference and climate change. These losses in habitats, particularly around the periphery of a range, can lead to changes in the behavior or other phenotypic characteristics of the species.

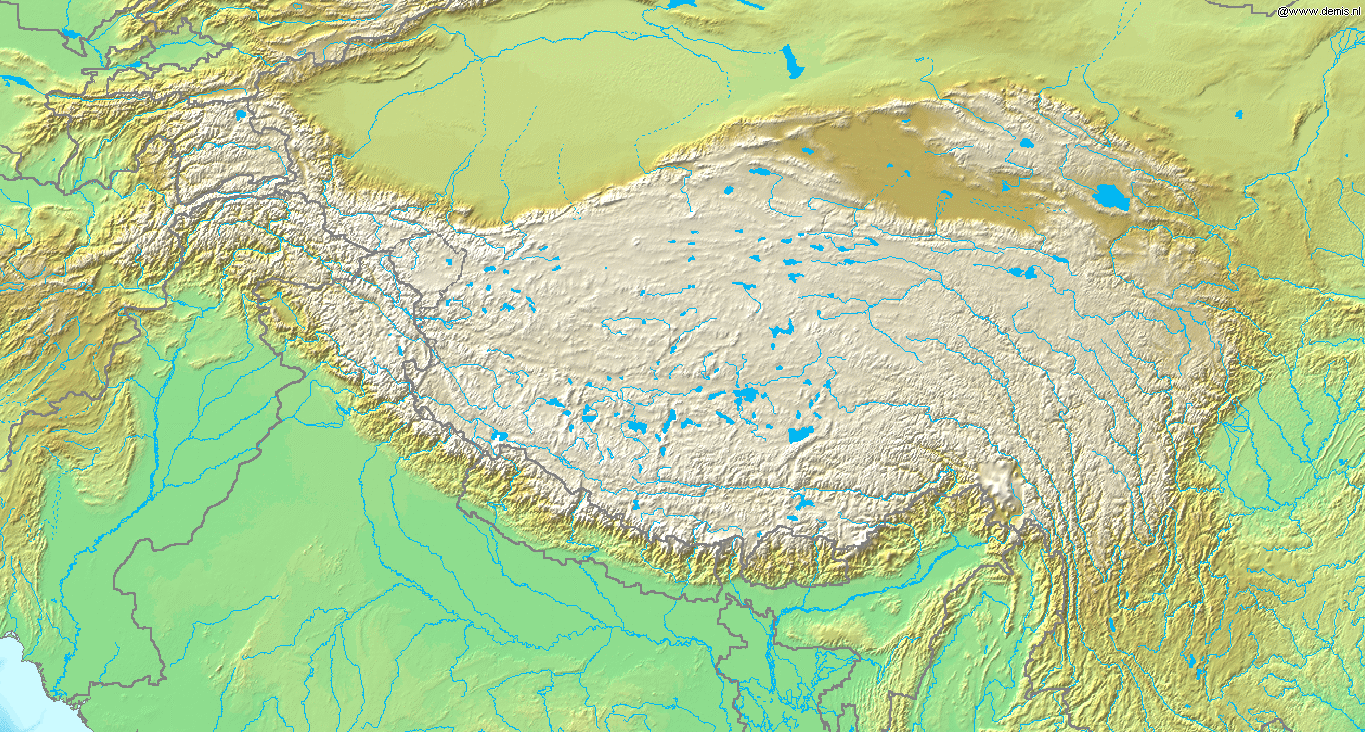
P. vlangalii is endemic to the Tibetan Plateau

=== Home range of the organism ===
P. vlangalii lives in high densities where each lizard has its own burrow, but its overall home ranges overlap with those of others. These lizards guard these home ranges as they are used as a refuge from predators. These lizards do not migrate.

== Population structure, speciation, and phylogeny ==
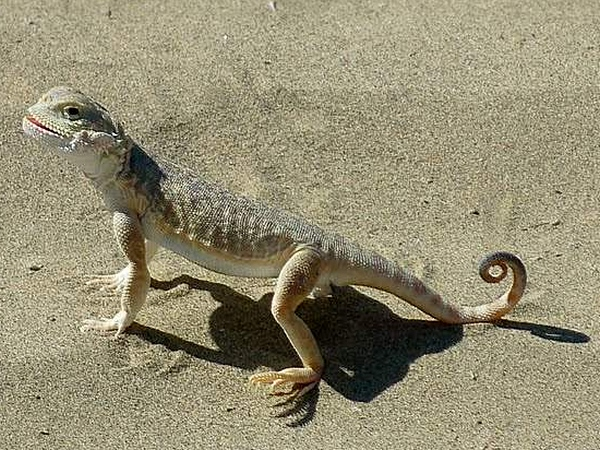
A closely related Phrynocephalus guttatus coiling its tail

The eastern range of viviparous lizards is home to Phrynocephalus guinanensis, Phrynocephalus putjatia, and Phrynocephalus vlangalii. These species are closely related but are subject to controversies regarding how they should be classified. According to Hu et al., there is more morphological differentiation between these three species than there is genetic differentiation, likely due to adaptation to each species' habitat. Habitat differentiation and contact between the species likely occurred due to the uplift or rising of the Qinghai-Tibetan plateau millions of years ago, when many areas became arid and dry. There is also additional evidence of possible historical hybridization events between these three species, such as shared haplotypes and high gene flow levels.

In 1909, Bedriaga et al. listed Phrynocephalus vlangalii parva, Phrynocephalus vlangalii nanschanica, and Phrynocephalus vlangalii pylzowi as subspecies of Phrynocephalus vlangii, or the Qinghai toad-headed agama. More recently, Phrynocephalus hongyuanensis was debated surrounding it being considered a potential subspecies but was ultimately placed in the main clade. There are two subspecies considered under Phrynocephalus vlangalii: Phrynocephalus vlangalii hongyuanensis and Phrynocephalus vlangalii vlangalii.

== Territoriality ==
Male territories tend to overlap more with females than with other males. Females not only avoid each other, but they also show each other aggression. They are more likely to overlap with males than with other females. Males and females are aggressive but females are notably more aggressive with each other. Lizards separately burrow, based on gender.

Since these lizards live in burrows, the entrance to their burrow acts as the center of their territory and is actively defended. Males and females each have their own burrow, so they equally defend their own territory by using their tails to signal to rivals to not invade their space. They do this by coiling and lifting their tail, showing the tail-tip badge that is black among males and orange among females, as well as pushing-up on their legs to lift their belly from the ground in order to also display the patch of color located there.

Males were observed to coil their tails faster than females and the display of lashing one's tail was only found among males. This display was the quickest when a male faced another male. Besides tail displays, females also chase away their rivals. Tail coiling is most pronounced (tight and high) when an adult faces another adult, rather than when facing a juvenile. Juveniles tend to mainly use the display of waving their tail as a signal of defense rather than coiling or lashing. A positive correlation between tail length and territory size has also been observed.

Males employ resident and floater tactics. Residents are usually found in the same small areas to defend their territory against rivals by displaying their tails and patches and chasing conspecifics. Floaters do not occupy areas, do not defend territory, and are thought to display in a different manner than residents to signal that they are of a different social status than residents.

== Reproduction and Life cycle ==
Courtship occurs in May and females give birth to their young from mid-July to late August. Most lizards grow faster in warmer environmental conditions because they are ectothermic animals. However, these lizards grow faster at higher elevations. As the elevation in which the lizards live increases, fewer, yet larger offspring are born. Therefore, these lizards may be growing faster at higher elevations because they are hatching at larger sizes and with more resources. Brood size ranges from 2-6 offspring. However, number of offspring and the mean mass of the offspring is positively correlated with female snout-vent-length.

A common garden experiment conducted by Lu et al. demonstrated that difference in growth rate between low-elevation P. vlangalii and high elevation P. vlangalii may be due to developmental plasticity rather than genetics. The lizards that were born and grew up at the highest elevations on the Tibetan plateau tended to grow faster and reach larger sizes as adults compared to those in relatively lower elevations. When both types of lizards were brought into a lab, the young lizards had similar growth rates, suggesting the difference in growth rate and adult size in the field is due to the lizards adapting to survive in their different habitats. Higher abundance of prey at higher elevation is likely associated for these differences, since smaller lizards born at high altitudes have higher growth rates than lizards born larger at a lower elevation if there is abundant food supply.

== Mating ==
There is limited intersexual aggression between males and females. Female-female aggression is often observed to defend territory, resources and maximizing reproductive success.

=== Female/Female interactions ===
These lizards participate in female-female aggression when there is competition for mates since the males would be useful for reproduction. Since there are more females than males among this species, female-female intrasexual aggression serves to defend territory and resources (males have been observed to help females defend their territory and defend against other males hoping to forcefully mate with females, but females themselves will display to other females to protect their burrows). Forced mating by floater males can be dangerous for females, since females have died from mating multiple times. Resident females, or females that tend to stay in one location, are faster to display their coiled tail and belly patch to a rival when there is a neighbor male nearby. They signal faster with a male present as well, but only during mating season. Female-female aggression is also present outside of mating season.

=== Female/Male interactions ===
These lizards are viviparous, meaning females give birth to live young. Females tend to have one mate since multiple matings, especially forced matings, can be deadly. Female lizards may also guard their mates. Since females are very aggressive towards other females and do not overlap their territories with those of other females, it is difficult for males to defend potential multiple mates. Because these lizards do not migrate, they tend to associate in groups that are more kin-related.

== Social behavior ==
P. vlangalii heavily rely on burrow for protection from predation and harsh weather. Burrows are important for the survival of these lizards both during the summer (when they are most active and there are many predators) and winter (against the harsh cold). Adult lizards occupy separate burrows, and young juveniles around one year old mostly live in abandoned burrows and occasionally stay in the burrows of their parents. However, these instances are not common or numerous enough to be significant. Male adults' territories tend to overlap more with adult females than with other males, especially males that have a better, healthier body condition. Similarly, adult females' territories overlap more with males than with other females.

Each lizard tends to stay in their one burrow rather than move around in search for new ones. Some will dwell in two or three burrows.

== Microbiome ==
Among three populations of P. vlangalii that lived at different altitudes, the most abundant intestinal microbiota were bacteroidetes, firmicutes, and proteobacteria. As elevation increased, verrucomicrobia, the fourth most abundant microbiota found, decreased and bacteroides increased. Each microbiota in the lizard's gut is important for biological functions such as nutrient metabolism. The variation in gut microbiome of P. vlangalii allows them to conserve energy by reducing digestive energy expenditure at higher elevations. The types and amount of each micro biota found are affected by the geography and climate the lizard lives in. The lizards used in this study live at altitudes of 2,900 m, 3,338 m, and 4,250 m.
