= Phrynocephalus golubewii =

Conservation status
- Critically Endangered (IUCN 3.1)

Scientific classification
- Kingdom: Animalia
- Phylum: Chordata
- Class: Reptilia
- Order: Squamata
- Suborder: Iguania
- Family: Agamidae
- Genus: Phrynocephalus
- Species: P. golubewii

Binomial name
- Phrynocephalus golubewii Shenbrot & Semyonov, 1990
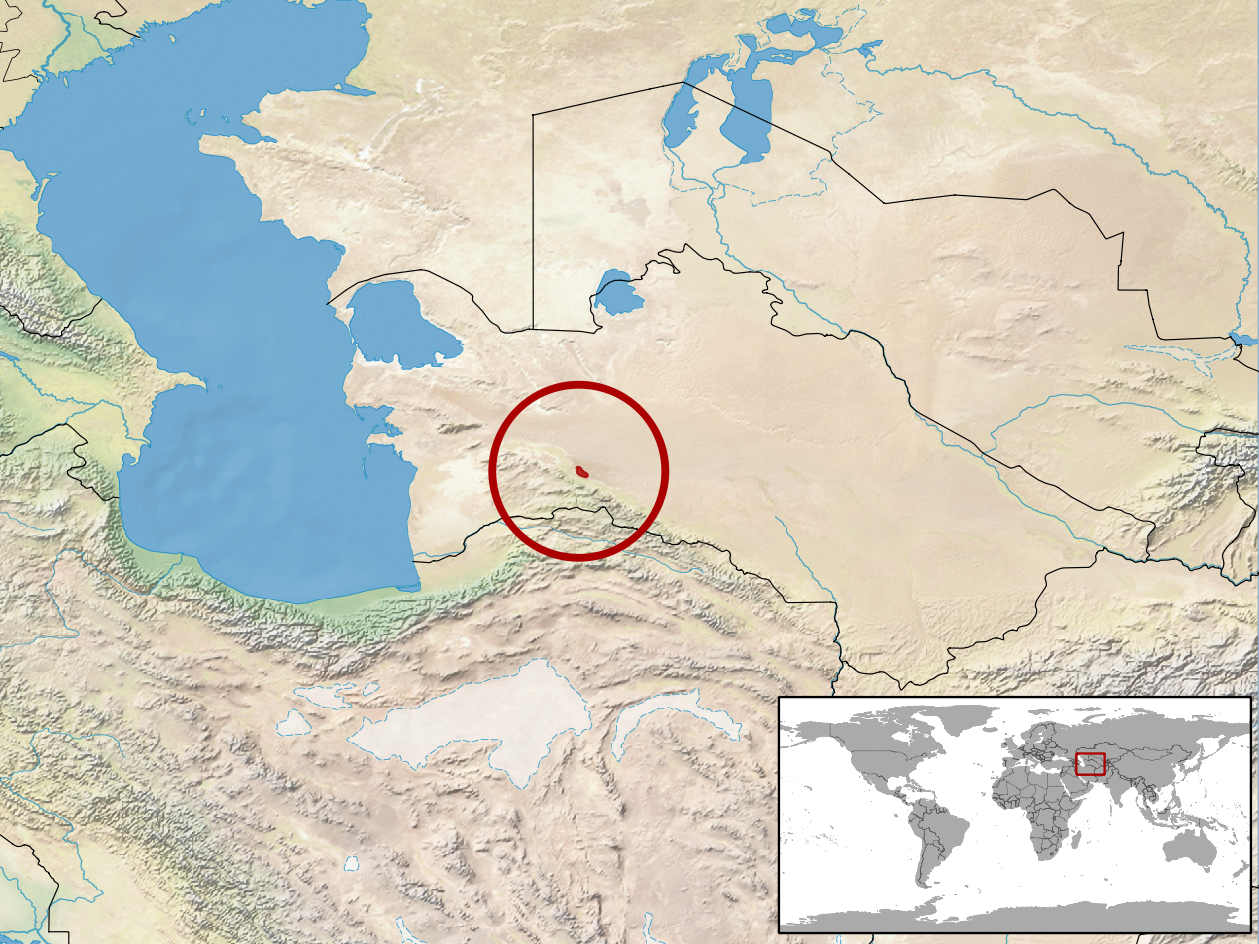

Species of lizard

Phrynocephalus golubewii is a species of lizard in the family Agamidae. The species is endemic to Turkmenistan.

== Etymology ==
The specific name, golubewii, is in honor of Russian herpetologist Michael Leonidovich Golubev.

== Geographic range ==
P. golubewii is found in southwestern Turkmenistan.

== Habitat ==
The preferred natural habitat of P. golubewii is desert salt flat, at altitudes below 100 m (330 ft).

== Reproduction ==
P. golubewii is oviparous.
