= Ctenotus olympicus =

Conservation status
- Least Concern (IUCN 3.1)

Scientific classification
- Kingdom: Animalia
- Phylum: Chordata
- Class: Reptilia
- Order: Squamata
- Suborder: Scinciformata
- Infraorder: Scincomorpha
- Family: Sphenomorphidae
- Genus: Ctenotus
- Species: C. olympicus

Binomial name
- Ctenotus olympicus Hutchinson & Donnellan, 1999
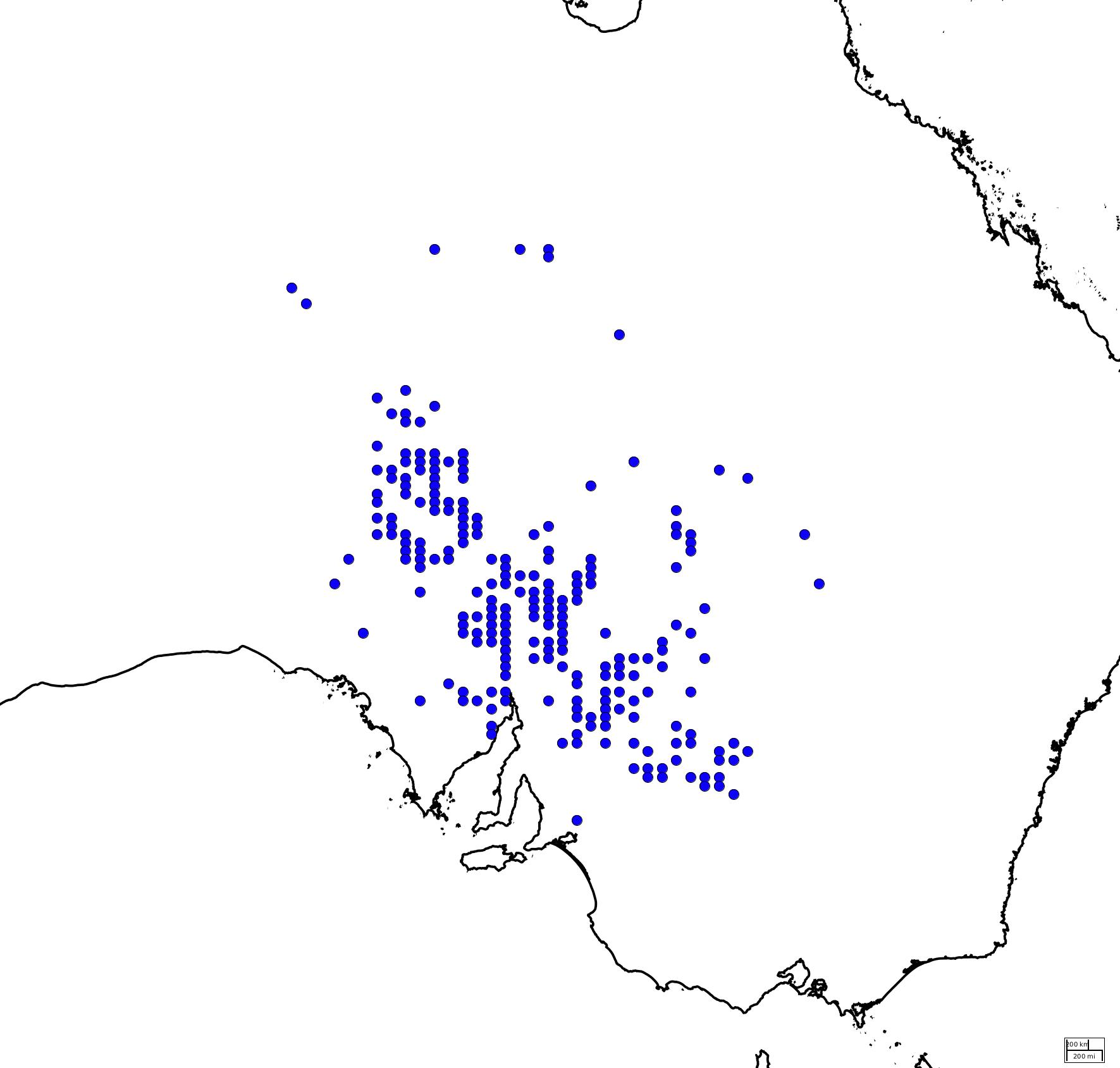
- Distribution of Ctenotus olympicus in Australia.

Species of lizard

Ctenotus olympicus, the olympic ctenotus, spotted ctenotus or saltbush ctenotus, is a species of skink endemic to the arid shrublands of central and southern Australia.

== Taxonomy and evolutionary relationships ==
Hutchinson and Donnell first described C. olympicus in 1999, recognising its genetic differentiation to the similar C. leonhardii and C. orientalis. It is named after Olympic Dam, the locality of its finding. Although this nomenclature also pays tribute to the common trend of Greek mythology influencing Ctenotus species names, hence 'olympicus'.

Speciation of C. olympicus is attributed to a branching off away from the Ctenotus strauchii lineage, in conjunction with the concurrent speciation of C. orientalis and C. leonhardii.

== Description ==
The olympic ctenotus is a small terrestrial lizard of the Scincidae family, native to arid areas of inland Australia. Olympic ctenotus individuals can display a range of colourations, from beige to medium brown, and this is often complimented by a metallic lustre. A dark vertebral stripe is almost always apparent from the nape to the hips. A pale dorsolateral stripe is usually apparent, extending continuously from the forelimbs and becoming a more broken line along the body. The upper flank of the lizard is generally of a darker hue, with 3-4 rows of white spots highly noticeable. Individuals always display a white undersurface, and limbs are reddish brown with dark streaks. There are usually 29 midbody scales, although this can range between 28 and 32. These characteristics are displayed in the first figure.

Ctenotus olympicus individuals generally grow to lengths of between 60 and 72mm, and this small size benefits a tendency to shelter underneath rocks and logs, or within small burrows.

== Distribution and habitat ==
The olympic ctenotus is predominantly distributed across central and northern South Australia, stretching into the Northern Territory, and adjacent areas of western New South Wales and Queensland. It has also been recorded sporadically in the eastern interior of Western Australia. This distribution encompasses notable land forms and features such as the Lake Eyre and Lake Torrens basins, northern reaches of the Flinders Ranges, and the Olary Plains of South Australia.

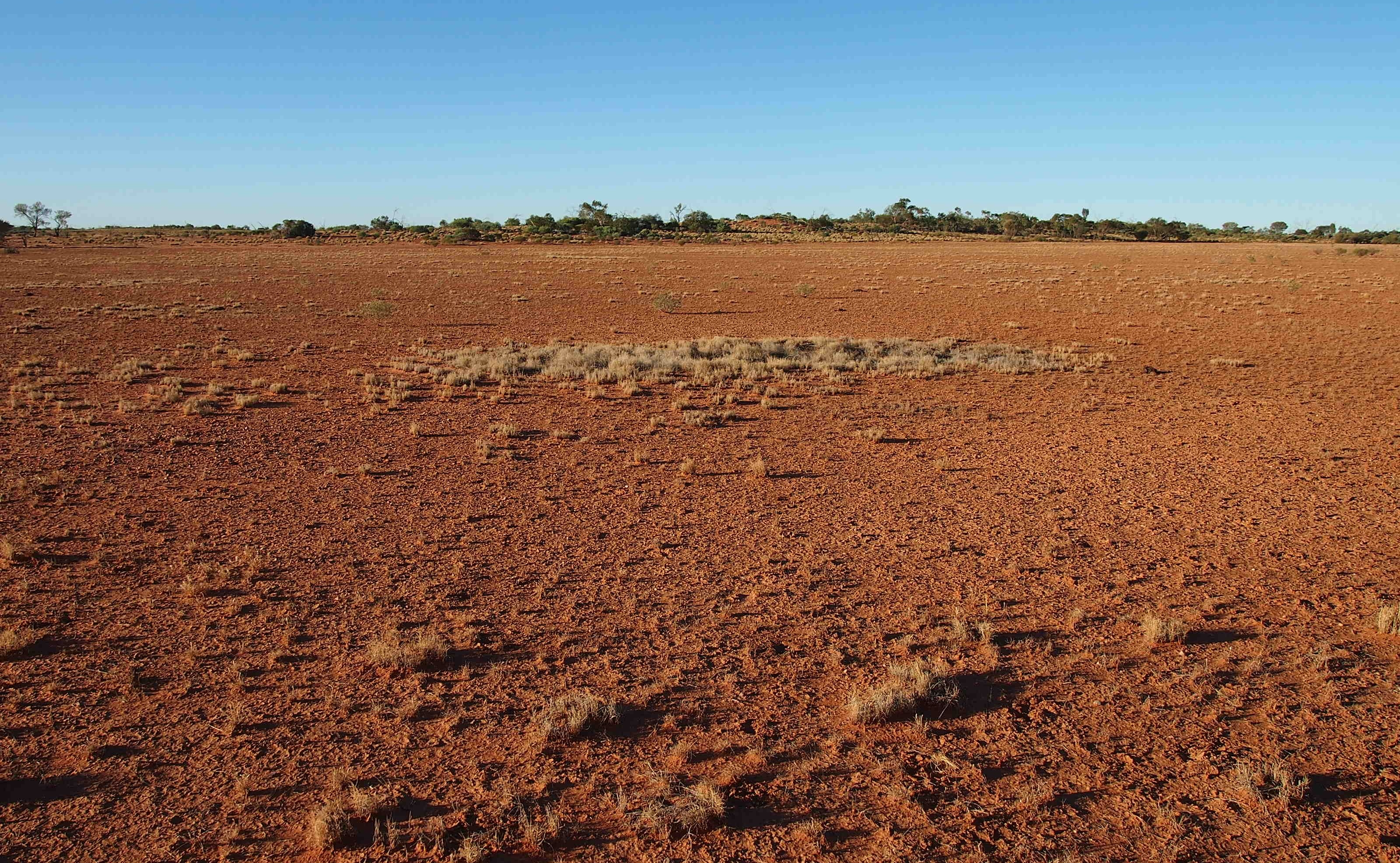
A typical gibber plain

The habitat of C. olympicus is restricted to arid regions, although within these confines it has been known to reside in gibber deserts, chenopod shrublands, and arid scrubs. It thrives on heavy, stony soils and is commonly found around rock outcrops and other stony habitats. On plains, it will typically burrow under rocks or bushes and logs, while on gibber rises it shelters in holes and natural spaces beneath rocks. The ground cover in C. olympicus habitat is consistently dominated by chenopods, such as saltbush, and it may coexist with other Ctenotus species in many of these areas.

== Ecology ==
The olympic ctenotus shares a multitude of lifestyle characteristics and behaviours with C. orientalis and other small skinks endemic to arid southern central Australia.

=== Diet ===
Although limited data is available, it has been established that C. olympicus is a generalist insectivore, feeding primarily on a range of insects and spiders. There is a possibility that they may resort to vegetation consumption in extreme situations. It is this relatively unspecialised diet which ensures the persistence of individuals through periods of limited resource availability and enables them to take advantage of favourable conditions when they occur.

=== Reproduction ===
Like most lizards, C. olympicus reproduces oviparously (i.e. lays eggs), and breeds throughout the summer season. Anywhere between 2 and 7 eggs may be laid, depending on factors such as resource availability and other environmental conditions. Read proposes "low reproductive effort may be an attempt to increase survival during dry seasons when recruitment success is likely to be poor or may simply reflect insufficient resources to allow much reproductive effort. Survival of adults is typically high in Ctenotus, except in years of high reproductive effort".

=== Behaviour ===
Ctenotus activity has not been known to decrease on hot days, and coupled with summer breeding, this shows a tendency to thrive in hot weather. Olympic ctenotus individuals are often found sheltering under rocks or within burrows because the arid conditions across their home range make it straightforward to maintain a high body temperature during the day. Notably, males have been found to have a higher mortality rate than females, and this indicates energy expense which may potentially be caused by home range maintenance activities, potentially demonstrating that a degree of territoriality is common.

Read also states that "Owing to their abundance, trapability and occupancy of a wide variety of habitats, Ctenotus are increasingly being used as indicators of environmental quality in the Australian arid zone.", this provides an important motive to continually monitor C. olympicus and other Ctenotus species on an ongoing basis .

== Threats and predators ==
A study by Waudby and Petit in 2015 has shown that C. olympicus responds negatively to an increase in grazing. This may be the result of direct impacts such trampling of burrows and shelters, or indirect impacts such as habitat modification through long periods of unrestricted browsing. While olympic ctenotus individuals prefer hot conditions, reductions in resource availability due to the ongoing impacts of climate change may slow the rate of reproduction in the species.

The dominant predators of C. olympicus are snakes and feral cats, although various avifauna may also prey on the species. While they are not a preferred food source for feral cats, they can become a key dietary supplement when rabbit populations decline, particularly in regions where Ctenotus are abundant. It is possible that reptiles such as C. olympicus may even be preferred over other small mammals in areas where an alternative for rabbits is required, assumably due to their abundance in many of these regions.
