= Phrynocephalus lutensis =

Scientific classification
- Domain: Eukaryota
- Kingdom: Animalia
- Phylum: Chordata
- Class: Reptilia
- Order: Squamata
- Suborder: Iguania
- Family: Agamidae
- Genus: Phrynocephalus
- Species: P. lutensis

Binomial name
- Phrynocephalus lutensis Kamali & Anderson, 2015

Species of lizard

Phrynocephalus lutensis, the Lut Desert toad-headed agama, is a species of agamid lizard found in Iran.
