= Phrynocephalus strauchi =

Conservation status
- Vulnerable (IUCN 3.1)

Scientific classification
- Kingdom: Animalia
- Phylum: Chordata
- Class: Reptilia
- Order: Squamata
- Suborder: Iguania
- Family: Agamidae
- Genus: Phrynocephalus
- Species: P. strauchi

Binomial name
- Phrynocephalus strauchi Nikolsky, 1899
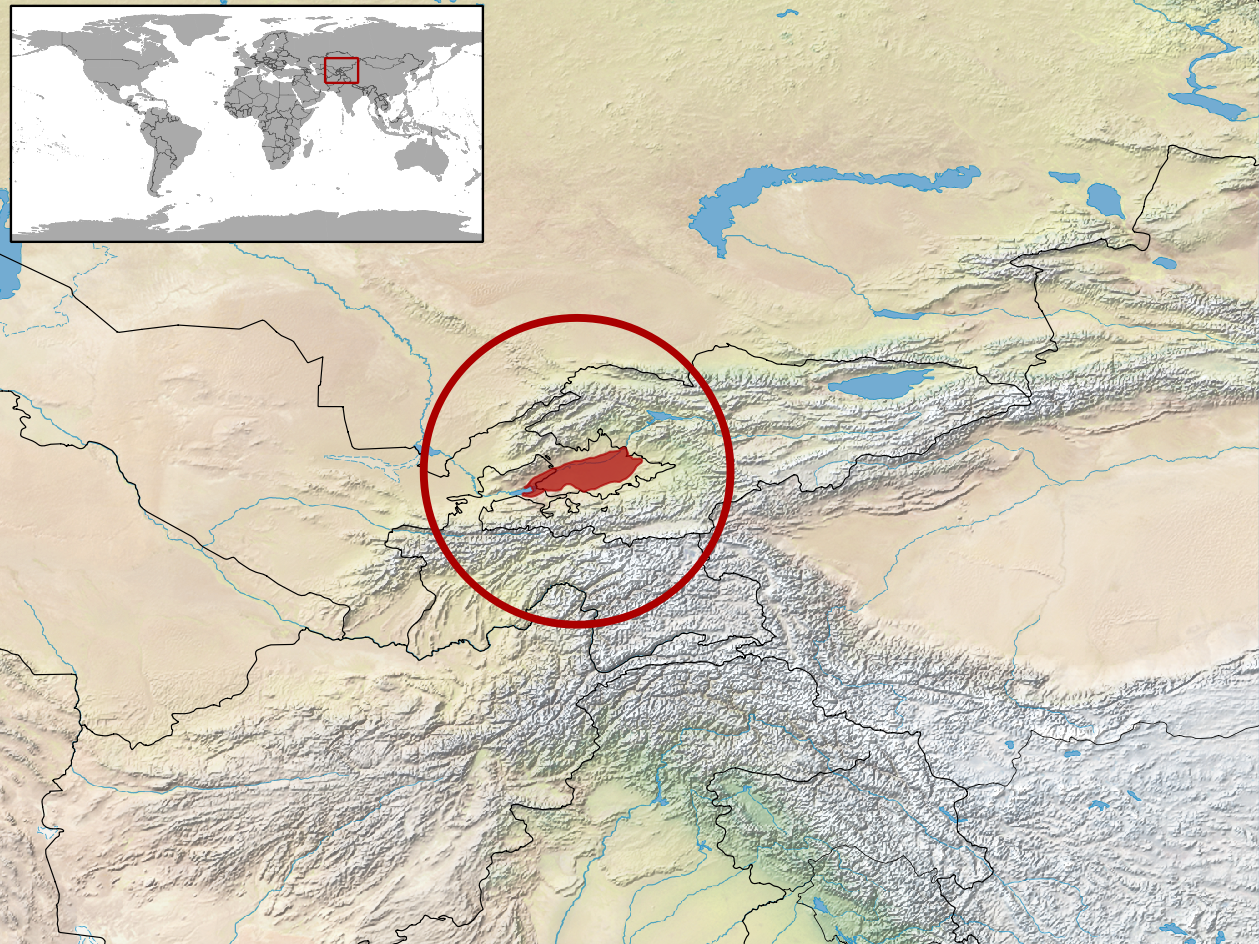

Species of lizard

Phrynocephalus strauchi, Strauch's toad agama, is a species of agamid lizard found in Tajikistan, Kyrgyzstan, and Uzbekistan.
