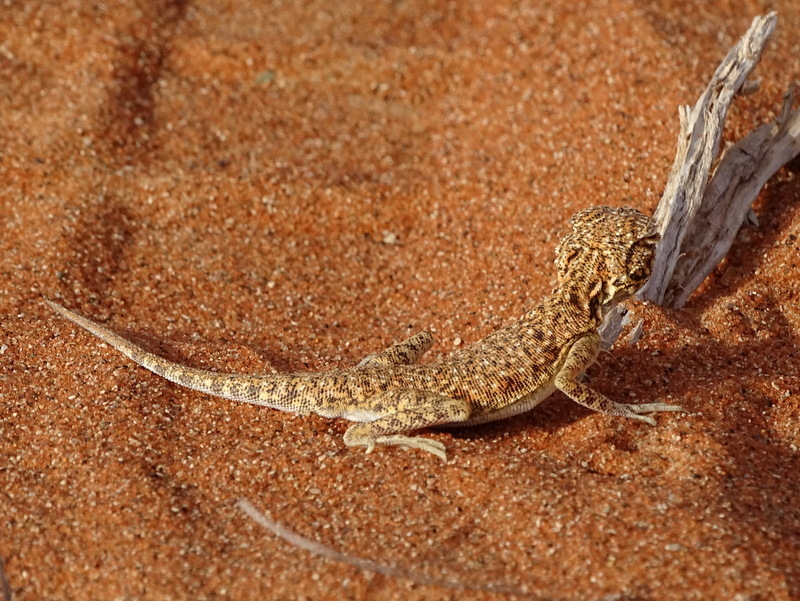

Conservation status
- Least Concern (IUCN 3.1)

Scientific classification
- Kingdom: Animalia
- Phylum: Chordata
- Class: Reptilia
- Order: Squamata
- Suborder: Iguania
- Family: Agamidae
- Genus: Phrynocephalus
- Species: P. arabicus

Binomial name
- Phrynocephalus arabicus Anderson, 1894
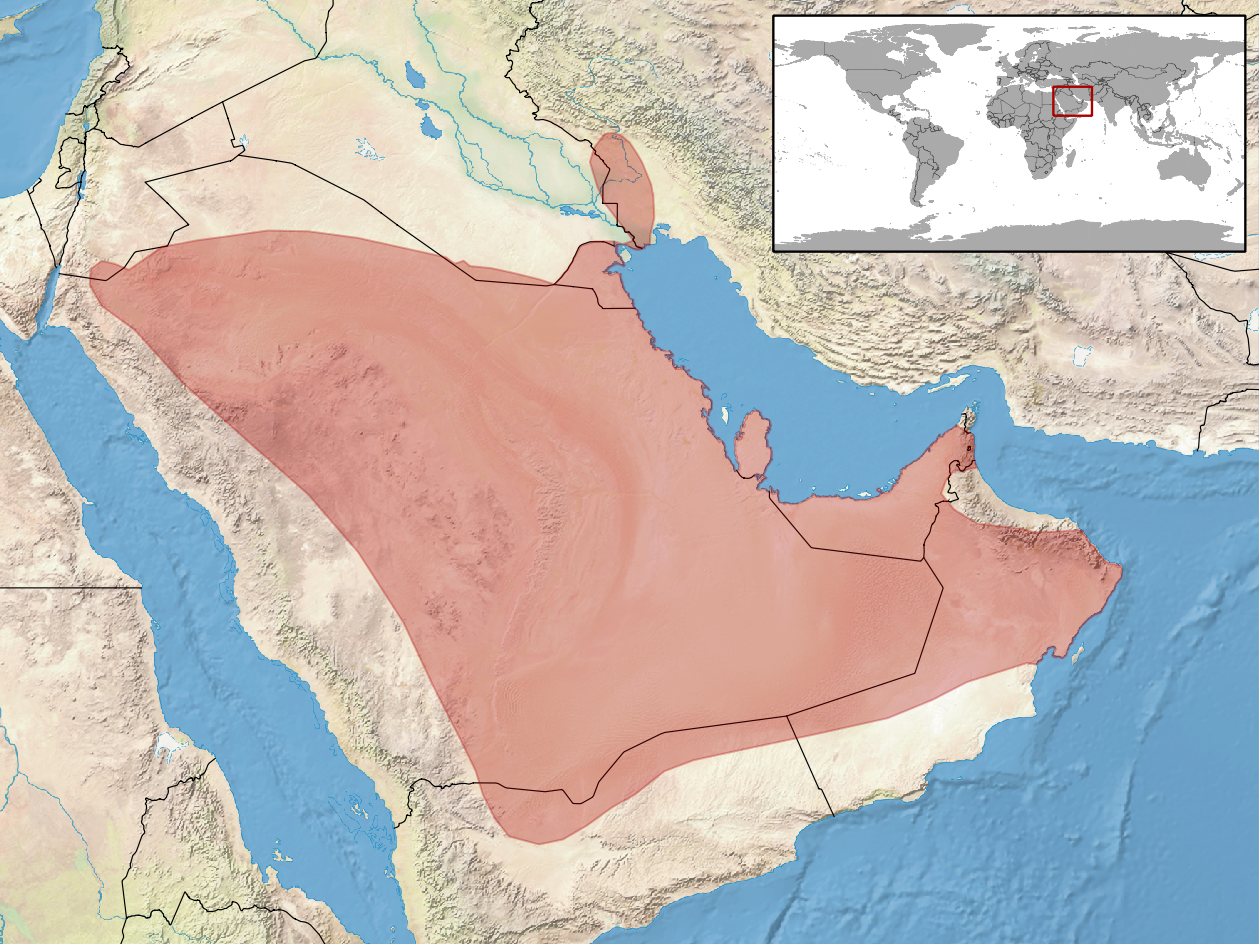

= Phrynocephalus arabicus =

Species of lizard

Arabian toad-headed agama (Phrynocephalus arabicus) is a species of agamid lizard found in Saudi Arabia, Qatar, United Arab Emirates, Oman, Iran, and Jordan.

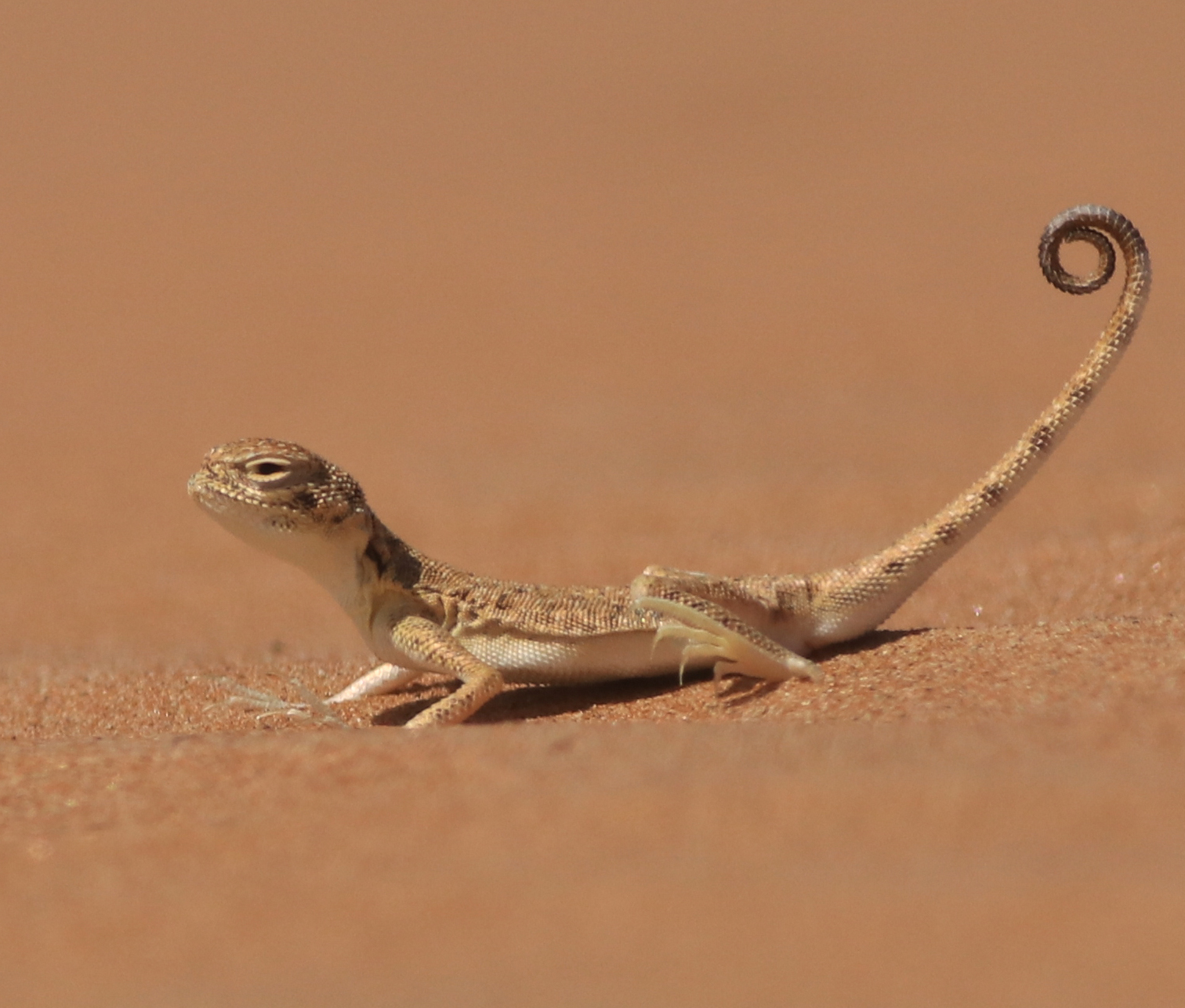
Arabian Toad-headed Agama from United Arab Emirates

== Description ==
It is one of 34 recognized species within the genus Phrynocephalus. In 2014, Melkinov split P. arabicus into 4 distinct species: arabicus sensu stricto, nejdensis, macropeltis, and ahvazicus. To date only P. ahvazicus has been formally recognized as a separate species.

P. arabicus sensu stricto is recognizable by its unique tail coloration. It has a white coloration on the underside of the tail with a black tip. When the animal is alerted the whole last quarter of the tail becomes black. P. arabicus also has a relatively long tail and a pointed snout. Adults may attain a snout-to-vent length (SVL) of 51 mm (2 in) and weigh 4.08g on average.

== Behavior ==
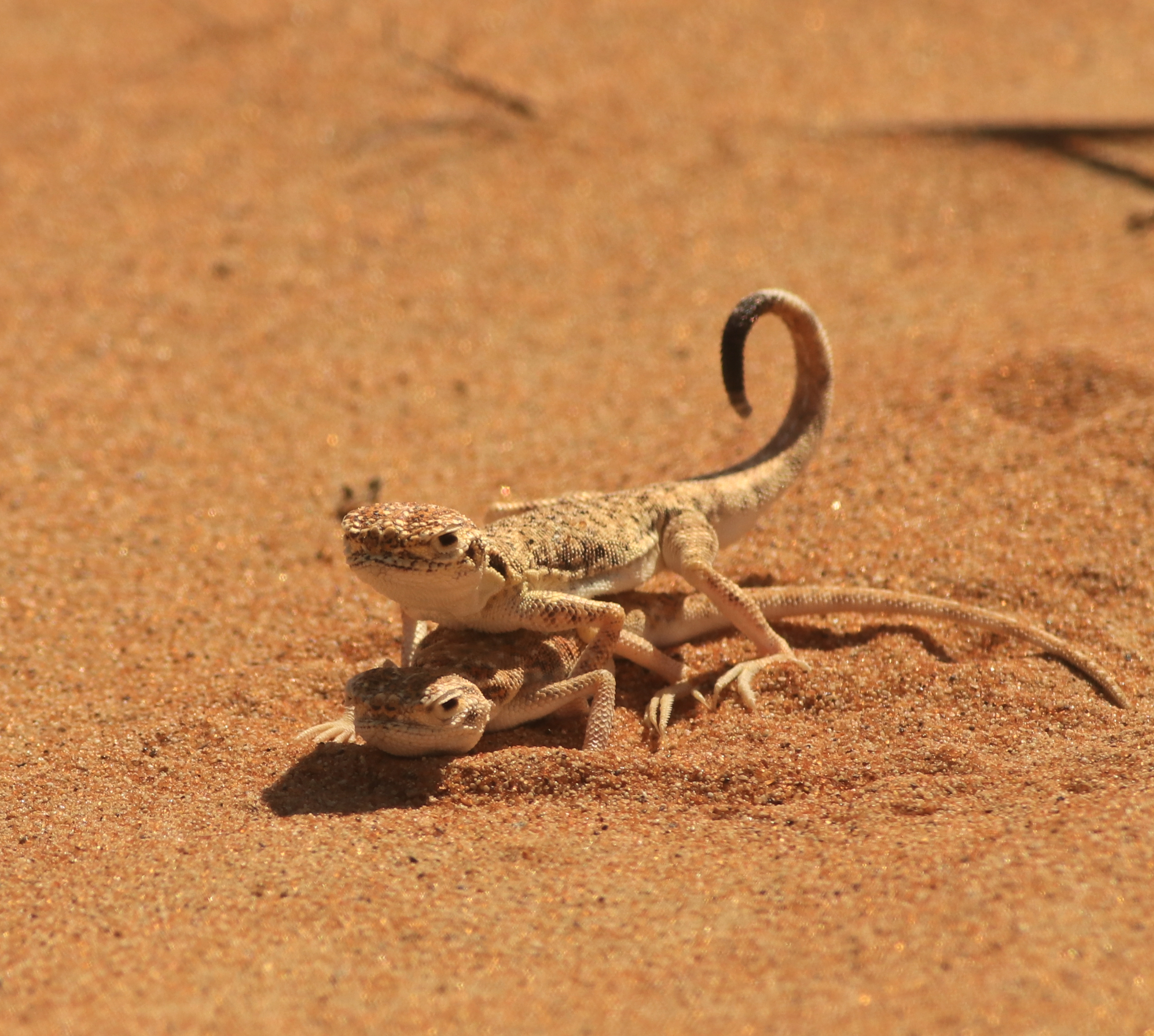
Arabian Toad-headed Agama breeding

This species is diurnal. They are insectivores and females only lay 1–2 eggs per clutch.
