= Phrynocephalus erythrurus =

Conservation status
- Least Concern (IUCN 3.1)

Scientific classification
- Kingdom: Animalia
- Phylum: Chordata
- Class: Reptilia
- Order: Squamata
- Suborder: Iguania
- Family: Agamidae
- Genus: Phrynocephalus
- Species: P. erythrurus

Binomial name
- Phrynocephalus erythrurus Zugmayer, 1909

Species of lizard

Sagus Kul lizard (Phrynocephalus erythrurus) is a species of agamid lizard endemic to China. This species is adapted to extremely high altitudes and can be found at elevation of 4500-5300m.
