= Phrynocephalus saidalievi =

Conservation status
- Vulnerable (IUCN 3.1)

Scientific classification
- Kingdom: Animalia
- Phylum: Chordata
- Class: Reptilia
- Order: Squamata
- Suborder: Iguania
- Family: Agamidae
- Genus: Phrynocephalus
- Species: P. saidalievi

Binomial name
- Phrynocephalus saidalievi (Sattorov, 1981)

Species of lizard

Phrynocephalus saidalievi, the Fergana toad-headed agama, is a species of agamid lizard found in Uzbekistan, Tajikistan, and Kyrgyzstan.
