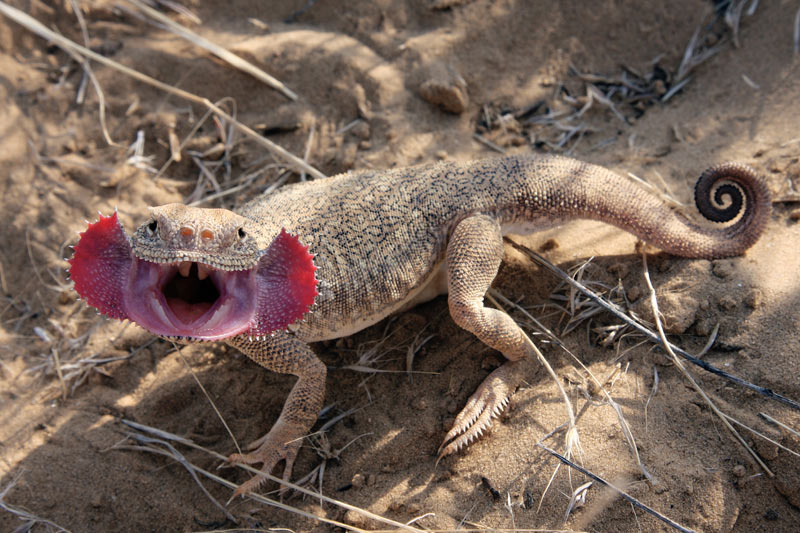

Conservation status
- Least Concern (IUCN 3.1)

Scientific classification
- Kingdom: Animalia
- Phylum: Chordata
- Class: Reptilia
- Order: Squamata
- Suborder: Iguania
- Family: Agamidae
- Genus: Phrynocephalus
- Species: P. mystaceus

Binomial name
- Phrynocephalus mystaceus (Pallas, 1776)

Synonyms
- Lacerta mystacea Pallas, 1776

= Phrynocephalus mystaceus =

Species of lizard

Phrynocephalus mystaceus, also known as the secret toadhead agama and toad-headed agama, is a species of agamid lizard. It is found in southern Russia, Kazakhstan, and northwestern China (Xinjiang) and southward to northern Iran, Afghanistan, Turkmenistan, Tajikistan, Kyrgyzstan, and Uzbekistan.The most exciting feature of the toad-headed agamas is their defense mechanism. When threatened, they flatten their bodies and open their mouths wide, such that their bright-colored flaps open. This, along with continuous hissing, scares whatever predator they encounter.

== Subspecies ==
Two subspecies are recognized:

- Phrynocephalus mystaceus mystaceus (Pallas, 1776)
- Phrynocephalus mystaceus khorasanus Solovyeva, Dunayev, Nazarov, Radjabizadeh & Poyarkov, 2018

== Habitat ==
Phrynocephalus mystaceus is generally associated with unvegetated tops of large, high sand dunes and occurs at elevations of −45–1,000 m (−148–3,281 ft) above sea level.
