= Phrynocephalus ananjevae =

Scientific classification
- Kingdom: Animalia
- Phylum: Chordata
- Class: Reptilia
- Order: Squamata
- Suborder: Iguania
- Family: Agamidae
- Genus: Phrynocephalus
- Species: P. ananjevae

Binomial name
- Phrynocephalus ananjevae Melnikov, Melnikova, Nazarov, & Rajabizadeh, 2013
- Known localities of P. ananjevae in Iran

Species of lizard

Natalie's toad-headed agama (Phrynocephalus ananjevae) is a species of agamid lizard endemic to the Zagros Mountains in Iran. The specific epithet honours Natalia Ananjeva of the Zoological Institute in St. Petersburg, Russia for her contribution to herpetological research of the family Agamidae and Phrynocephalus in particular.

== Description ==
P. ananjevae is one of the 34 recognized species within the genus Phrynocephalus. It is a medium-sized Phrynocephalus with enlarged scales on the dorsal side of the body forming a prominent crest on the neck. The nostrils are set further apart and face forward. It has a tail shorter or equal to the body and a row of enlarged scales along the spine. Males may have slightly longer tails.
