= Phrynocephalus ornatus =

Scientific classification
- Domain: Eukaryota
- Kingdom: Animalia
- Phylum: Chordata
- Class: Reptilia
- Order: Squamata
- Suborder: Iguania
- Family: Agamidae
- Genus: Phrynocephalus
- Species: P. ornatus

Binomial name
- Phrynocephalus ornatus Boulenger, 1887
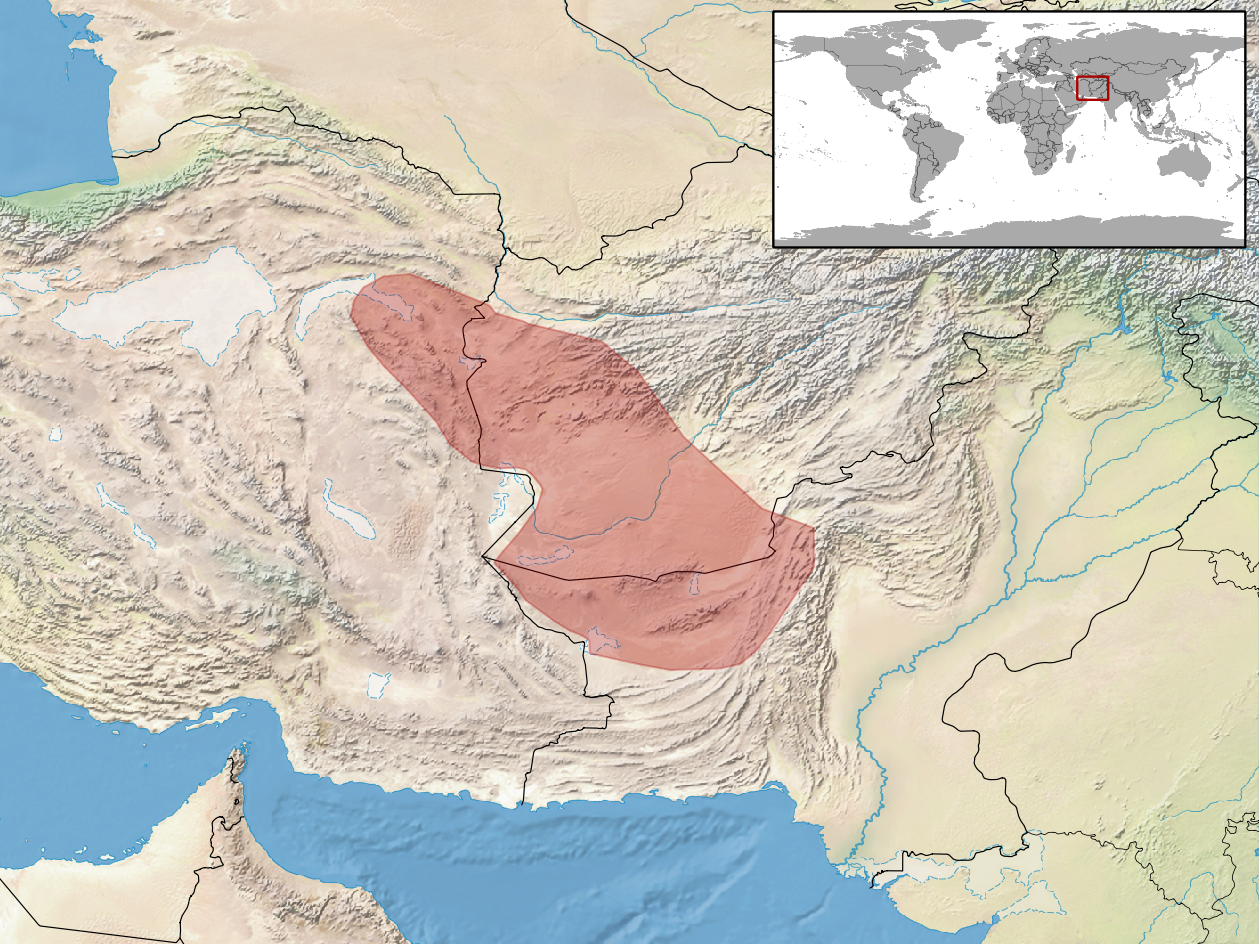

Species of lizard

Phrynocephalus ornatus is a species of agamid lizard found in Iran, Pakistan, and Afghanistan,

Diagnosis: Dorsal scales enlarge very gradually from flanks to mid-dorsal line, homogeneous; nasal shields in contact; no spinose scales on neck or back of head; both sides of fourth and outer aspect of third toes strongly fringed; three scales separate nasals from upper labials; two or three suborbital scales, none larger than adjacent scales; no dark-margmed dorsolateral stripe between fore and hind limbs. Tail 119-132 percent of snout-vent length (Anderson 1999: 93).

.
