= Phrynocephalus rossikowi =

Conservation status
- Endangered (IUCN 3.1)

Scientific classification
- Kingdom: Animalia
- Phylum: Chordata
- Class: Reptilia
- Order: Squamata
- Suborder: Iguania
- Family: Agamidae
- Genus: Phrynocephalus
- Species: P. rossikowi

Binomial name
- Phrynocephalus rossikowi Nikolsky, 1898

Species of lizard

Phrynocephalus rossikowi, the Uzbekistan toadhead agama, is a species of agamid lizard found in Turkmenistan and Uzbekistan.
