= Phrynocephalus euptilopus =

Conservation status
- Least Concern (IUCN 3.1)

Scientific classification
- Kingdom: Animalia
- Phylum: Chordata
- Class: Reptilia
- Order: Squamata
- Suborder: Iguania
- Family: Agamidae
- Genus: Phrynocephalus
- Species: P. euptilopus

Binomial name
- Phrynocephalus euptilopus Alcock & Finn, 1897

Species of lizard

Alcock's toad-headed agama (Phrynocephalus euptilopus), is a species of agamid lizard found in Pakistan and Afghanistan. The species was originally established based on just 6 specimens from Darband, Western Baluchistan. Only preserved specimens are currently on file with the last occurrence in July 1993.
