= Phrynocephalus vindumi =

Scientific classification
- Kingdom: Animalia
- Phylum: Chordata
- Class: Reptilia
- Order: Squamata
- Suborder: Iguania
- Family: Agamidae
- Genus: Phrynocephalus
- Species: P. vindumi

Binomial name
- Phrynocephalus vindumi Golubev, 1998

Species of lizard

Phrynocephalus vindumi is a species of agamid lizard found in Iran and Afghanistan.
