= Phrynocephalus clarkorum =

Conservation status
- Least Concern (IUCN 3.1)

Scientific classification
- Kingdom: Animalia
- Phylum: Chordata
- Class: Reptilia
- Order: Squamata
- Suborder: Iguania
- Family: Agamidae
- Genus: Phrynocephalus
- Species: P. clarkorum

Binomial name
- Phrynocephalus clarkorum Anderson & Leviton, 1967

Species of lizard

Phrynocephalus clarkorum, also known commonly as the Afghan toad-headed agama and Clark's toad-headed agama, is a species of lizard in the family Agamidae. The species is native to parts of Central and South Asia.

== Etymology ==
This species was named after British herpetologists Richard J. Clark and his wife Erica D. Clark (the specific name clarkorum is plural) for their contributions to herpetology. They worked together and co-wrote the paper "Report on a Collection of Amphibians and Reptiles from Turkey" (1973).

== Geographic range ==
P. clarkorum is found in Afghanistan and Pakistan.

== Habitat ==
The preferred natural habitats of P. clarkorum are desert and shrubland.

== Behavior ==
P. clarkorum is terrestrial and diurnal.

== Reproduction ==
P. clarkorum is oviparous. Breeding takes place in sprigtime, from March to May. Clutch size is 2–6 eggs.
