= Phrynocephalus luteoguttatus =

Conservation status
- Least Concern (IUCN 3.1)

Scientific classification
- Kingdom: Animalia
- Phylum: Chordata
- Class: Reptilia
- Order: Squamata
- Suborder: Iguania
- Family: Agamidae
- Genus: Phrynocephalus
- Species: P. luteoguttatus

Binomial name
- Phrynocephalus luteoguttatus Boulenger, 1887
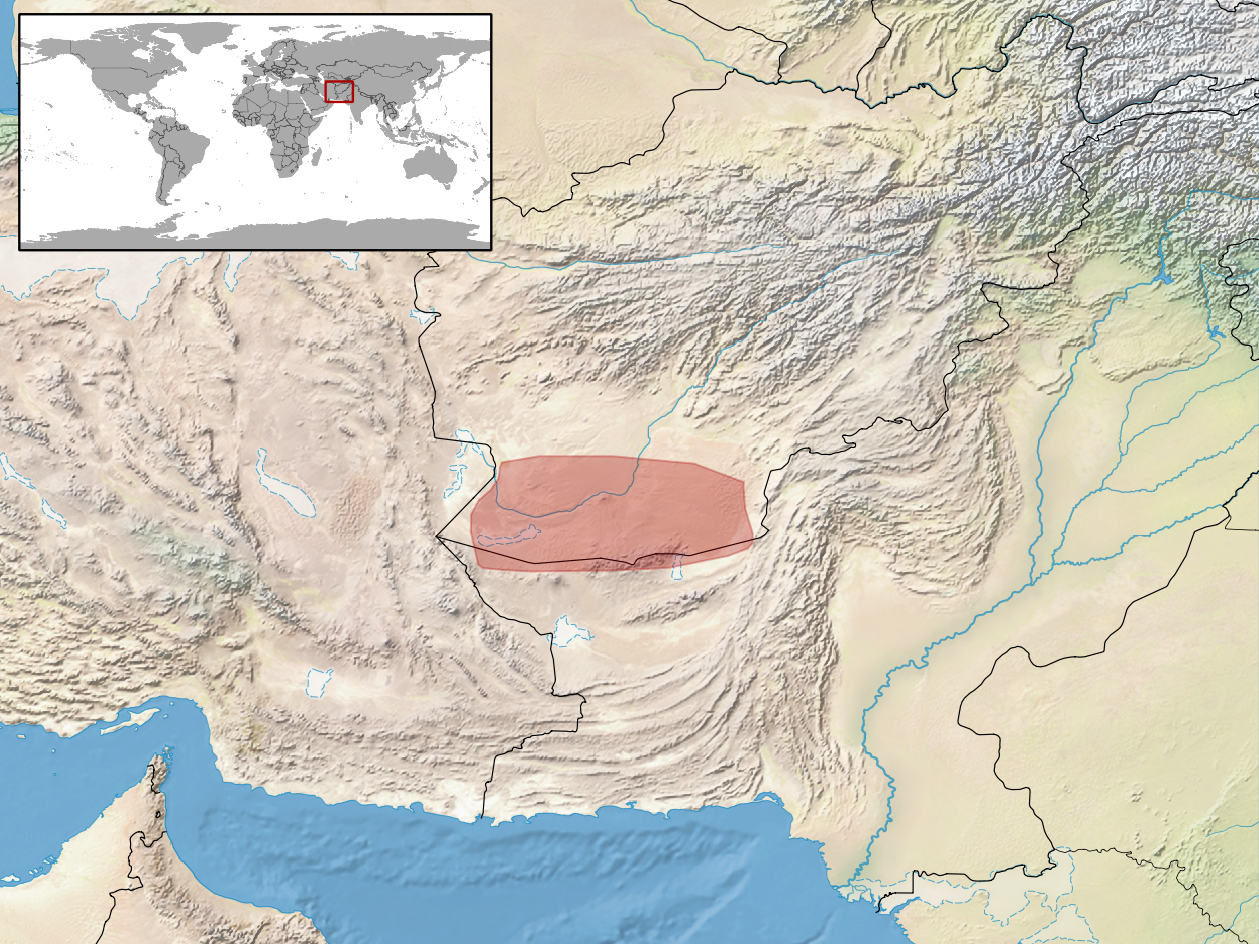

Species of lizard

Phrynocephalus luteoguttatus, the yellow-speckled toad-headed agama, is a species of agamid lizard found in Iran, Afghanistan, Pakistan (Baluchistan) and possibly in India.

The type locality is between Nushki and Helmand (border between Afghanistan and Baluchistan).
