= Phrynocephalus meridionalis =

Scientific classification
- Kingdom: Animalia
- Phylum: Chordata
- Class: Reptilia
- Order: Squamata
- Suborder: Iguania
- Family: Agamidae
- Genus: Phrynocephalus
- Species: P. meridionalis

Binomial name
- Phrynocephalus meridionalis (Dunayev, Solovyeva, & Poyarkov, 2012)

Species of lizard

Phrynocephalus meridionalis, the sunwatcher toadhead agama or Fergana toad-headed agama, is a species of agamid lizard found in Uzbekistan.
