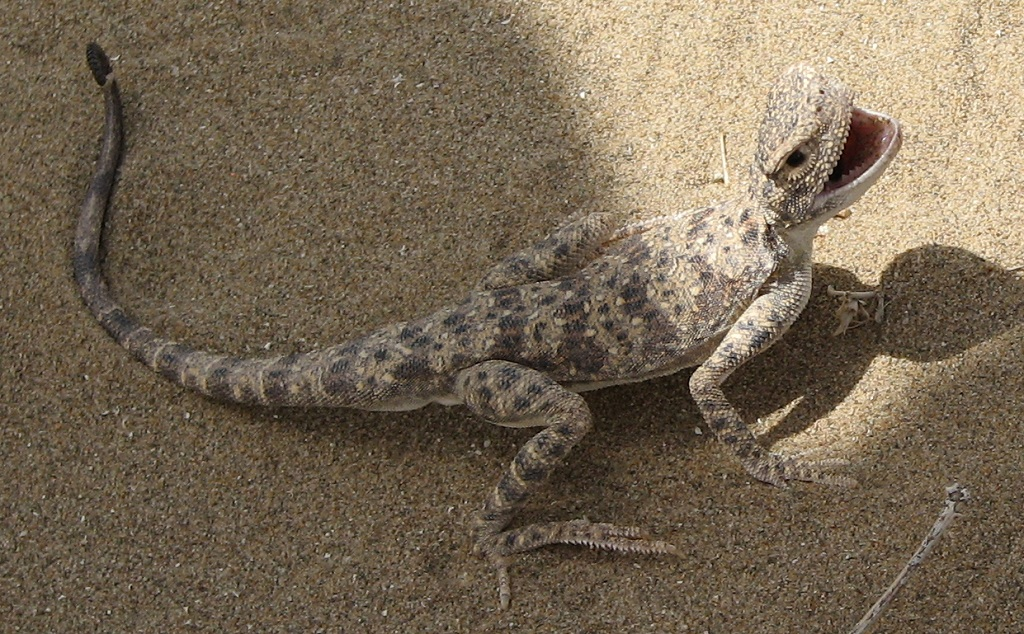

Conservation status
- Least Concern (IUCN 3.1)

Scientific classification
- Kingdom: Animalia
- Phylum: Chordata
- Class: Reptilia
- Order: Squamata
- Suborder: Iguania
- Family: Agamidae
- Genus: Phrynocephalus
- Species: P. scutellatus

Binomial name
- Phrynocephalus scutellatus (Olivier, 1807)

= Phrynocephalus scutellatus =

Species of lizard

Phrynocephalus scutellatus, the gray toadhead agama or gray toad head agama, is a species of agamid lizard. It is found in Iran, Afghanistan, and southwestern Pakistan.
