= Phrynocephalus raddei =

Conservation status
- Least Concern (IUCN 3.1)

Scientific classification
- Kingdom: Animalia
- Phylum: Chordata
- Class: Reptilia
- Order: Squamata
- Suborder: Iguania
- Family: Agamidae
- Genus: Phrynocephalus
- Species: P. raddei

Binomial name
- Phrynocephalus raddei Boettger, 1888

Species of lizard

Phrynocephalus raddei is a species of agamid lizard found in Turkmenistan, Uzbekistan, Tajikistan, Iran, and Afghanistan.
