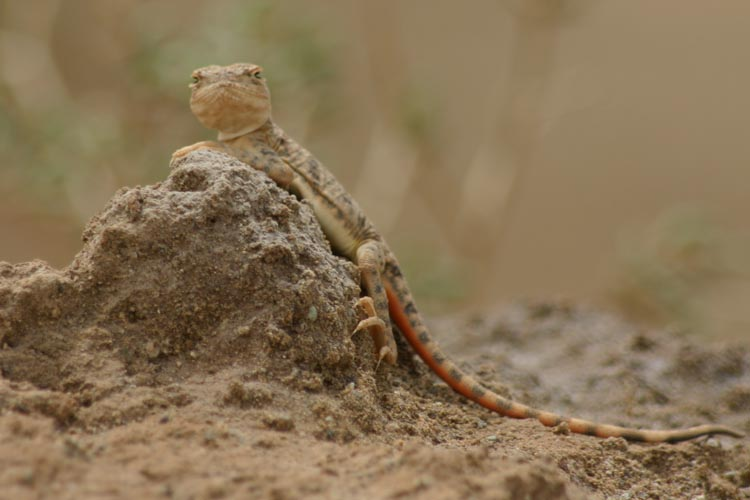

Conservation status
- Least Concern (IUCN 3.1)

Scientific classification
- Domain: Eukaryota
- Kingdom: Animalia
- Phylum: Chordata
- Class: Reptilia
- Order: Squamata
- Suborder: Iguania
- Family: Agamidae
- Genus: Phrynocephalus
- Species: P. maculatus

Binomial name
- Phrynocephalus maculatus Anderson, 1872

= Phrynocephalus maculatus =

Species of lizard

Phrynocephalus maculatus, the blacktail toadhead agama or spotted toad-headed agama, is a species of agamid lizard in Iran, Turkmenistan, Syria, Jordan, Iraq, Afghanistan, Pakistan, Saudi Arabia, Oman, United Arab Emirates, and Kuwait.
