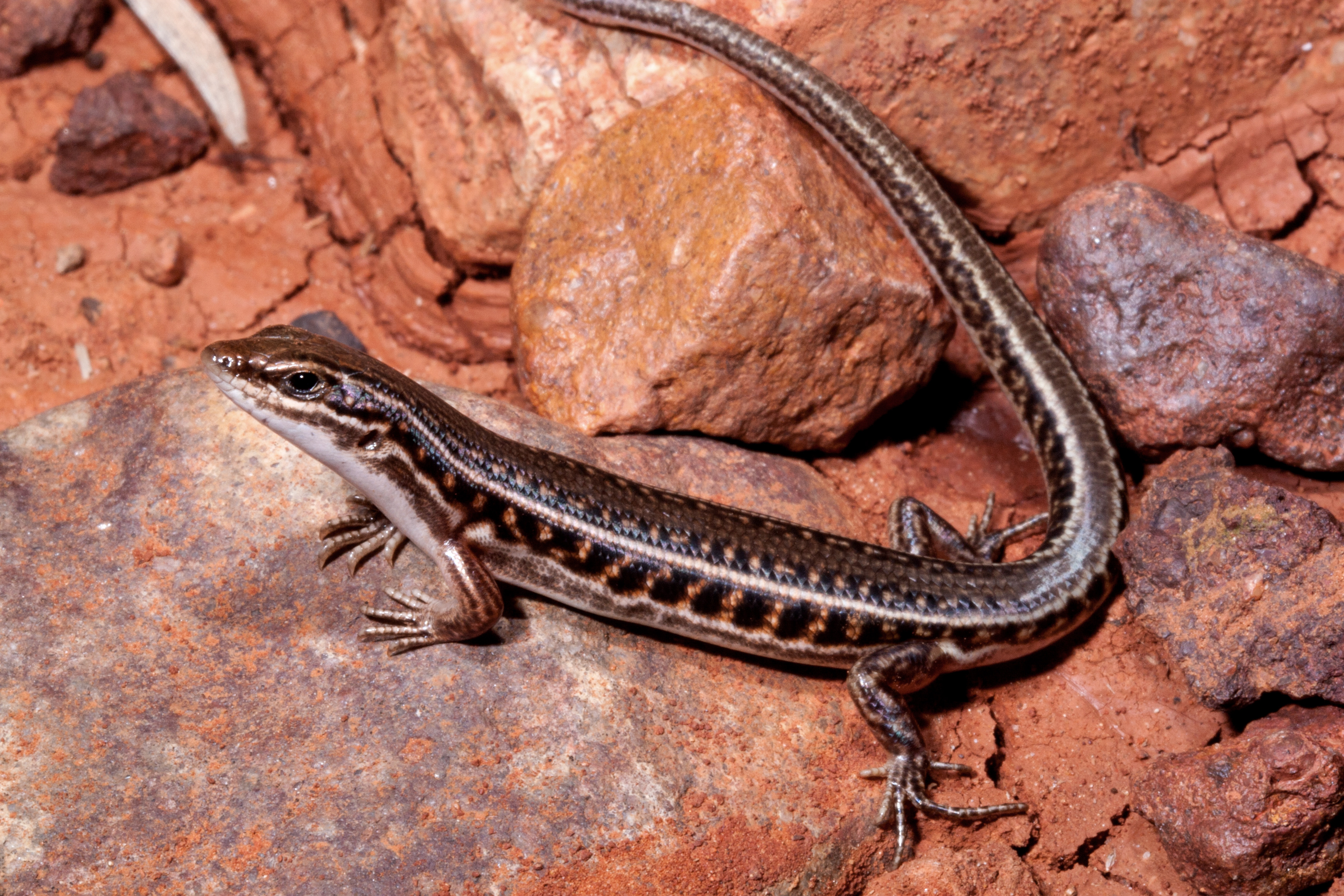

Conservation status
- Least Concern (IUCN 3.1)

Scientific classification
- Kingdom: Animalia
- Phylum: Chordata
- Class: Reptilia
- Order: Squamata
- Family: Scincidae
- Genus: Ctenotus
- Species: C. strauchii

Binomial name
- Ctenotus strauchii (Boulenger, 1887)

Synonyms
- Lygosoma strauchii Boulenger, 1887; Lygosoma (Sphenomorphus) strauchi — M.A. Smith, 1937; Ctenotus strauchii — Cogger, 1983

= Ctenotus strauchii =

Species of lizard

Ctenotus strauchii, also known commonly as the eastern barred wedge-snout ctenotus or Strauch's ctenotus, is a small species of lizard in the family Scincidae. The species is endemic to Australia and is found throughout semi-arid and arid regions in most of Australia's mainland states except Western Australia, although one record does exist for Western Australia in 1975.

== Etymology ==
The specific name, strauchii, is in honour of Russian herpetologist Alexander Strauch.

== Description ==
C. strauchii is a small skink, that has an average snout-to-vent length (SVL) of 5.5 cm (2.2 in), and varies in colour from chocolate brown to reddish-brown. A series of pale spots are enclosed by a black laterodorsal stripe, which is edged by a white dorsolateral stripe. This stripe is bordered above by a line of small black blotches. The upper flanks are black with a series of between 1 and 3 pale mostly vertical dots. A narrow white stripe may run from below the eye right through the mid body, where it passes through the groin and continues as a lower lateral stripe until it breaks up into spots of flecks of white along the side of the tail.

== Reproduction ==
C. strauchii is oviparous, which means it lays eggs. This contrasts with other skink species which are live bearers (viviparous). Egg clutch size is unknown.

== Conservation status ==
The conservation status of Ctenotus strauchii is listed as Least Concern (IUCN 3.1) risk. It does not qualify for a more at-risk category. Widespread and abundant taxa are included in this category.

== Threats ==
Although listed as common C. strauchii is not immune to environmental threats such as:

- Climate change
- Habitat destruction
- Habitat degradation
- Feral predators such as foxes, dogs and cats
- Disease
- Cane toads

== Habitat and ecology ==
C. strauchii inhabits areas with hard stony soils with minimal vegetation cover in woodland and scrubland areas, within the semi-arid and dry regions of Eastern Australia. It is found amongst debris such as fallen timber, leaf litter and other debris within mallee, savannah woodland and grassland areas C. strauchii was given its scientific name by George Albert Boulenger a Belgian-British zoologist who described and gave scientific names to over 2,000 new animal species, chiefly fish, reptiles, and amphibians. Skinks of the genus Ctenotus are often called comb-eared skinks, a reference to the scales aligned near the ear. They are active, diurnal lizards found in a variety of habitats.

== Geographic range ==
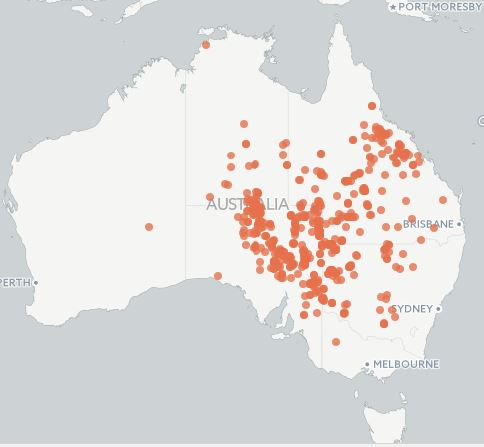
Records of Ctenotus strauchii (Australian living Atlas of Living Australia)

Ctenotus strauchii has been recorded in New South Wales, Victoria, South Australia, Queensland and Northern Territory
