= Alexander Strauch =

Russian naturalist (1832–1893)

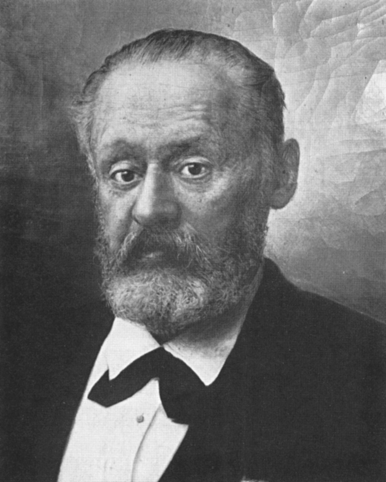
Alexander Strauch.

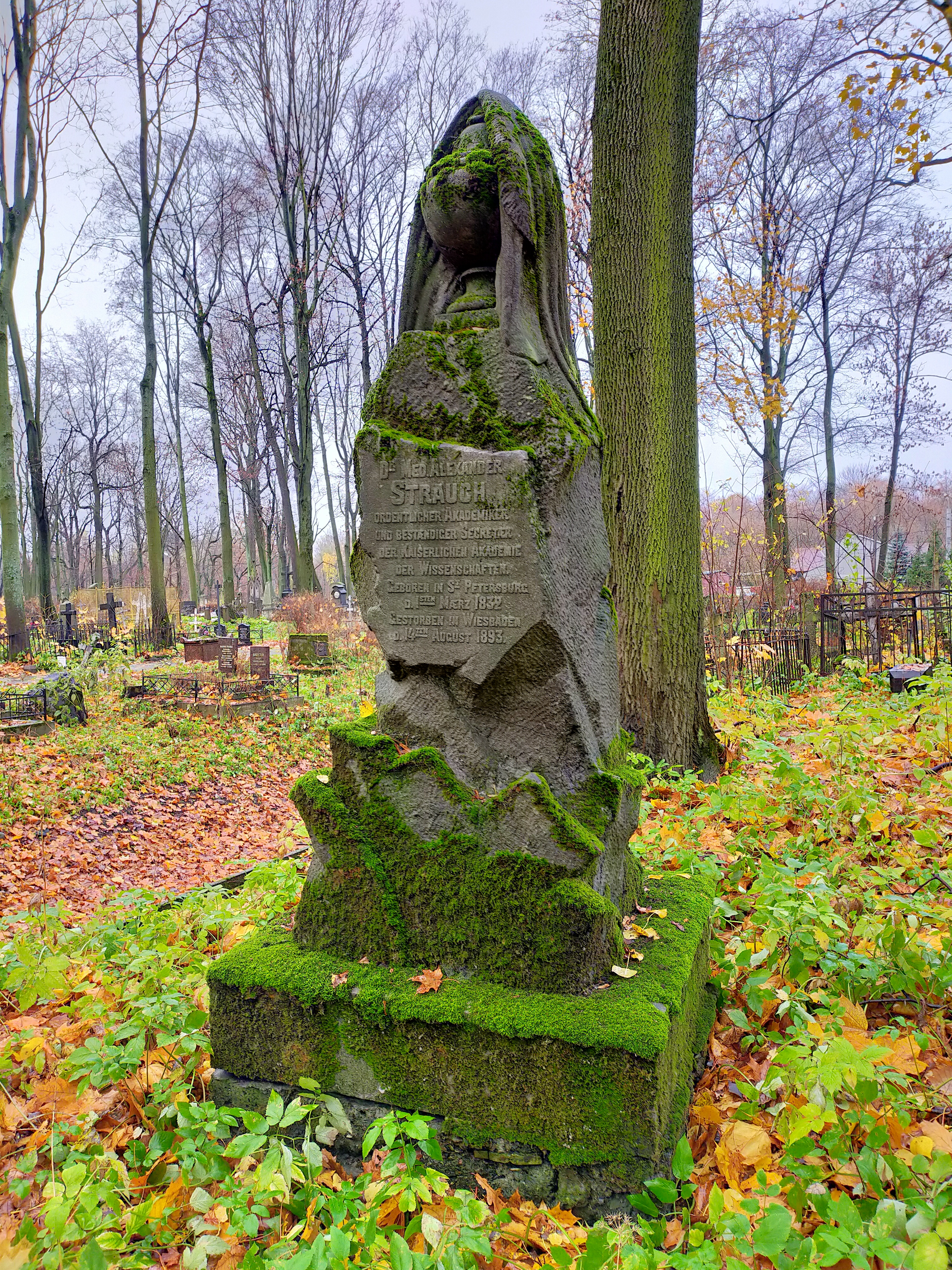
Alexander Strauch monument, Volkovo Lutheran Cemetery, St.Petersburg.

Alexander Strauch (Russian: Александр Александрович Штраух, romanized: Aleksandr Aleksandrovich Straukh; 1 March 1832, in Saint Petersburg – 14 August 1893, in Wiesbaden, Germany) was a Russian naturalist of German descent, most notably a herpetologist.

In 1861, he started working as a curator of the Zoological Museum at the Imperial Academy of Sciences in St. Petersburg. From 1879 to 1890, he was director of the museum. He is credited with establishing St. Petersburg as a major world center in the field of herpetology.

== Taxa named after Strauch ==
Taxa with the specific epithet of strauchi or strauchii commemorate his name, five examples being:

- Blanus strauchi (Bedriaga, 1884)
- Ctenotus strauchii (Boulenger, 1887)
- Eremias strauchi Kessler, 1878
- Gloydius strauchi (Bedriaga, 1912)
- Phrynocephalus strauchi Nikolsky, 1899.

Nota bene: A Taxon author in parentheses indicates that the species was originally described in a different genus.

His zoologist author abbreviation is Strauch.

== Selected works ==
- Die Vertheilung der Schildkröten über den Erdball : ein zoogeographischer Versuch, 1865 – The distribution of turtles across the globe, etc.
- Synopsis der Viperiden : nebst Bemerkungen über die geographische Verbreitung dieser Giftschlangen-Familie, 1869 – Synopsis of Viperidae.
- Revision der Salamandriden-Gattungen nebst Beschreibung einiger neuen oder weniger bekannten Arten dieser Familie, 1870 – Revision of Salamandridae genera along with descriptions of some new or lesser known species within the family.

== Sources ==
- "Штраух, Александр Александрович" . Brockhaus and Efron Encyclopedic Dictionary (in Russian). 1906.
