= Jacques von Bedriaga =

Russian herpetologist (1854–1906)

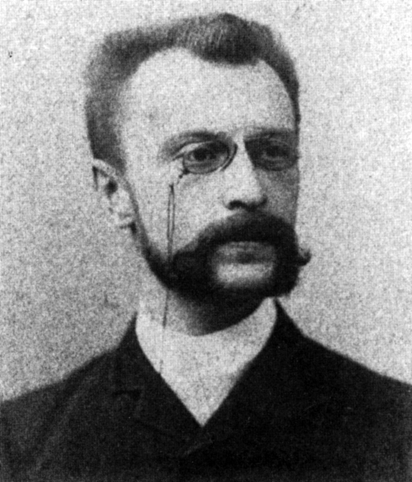
Bedriaga in 1891

Jacques Vladimir von Bedriaga, sometimes Bedryagha (Russian: Яков Владимирович Бедряга, romanized: Yakov Vladimirovich Bedryaga; 1854–1906), was a Russian herpetologist who was a native of Kriniz, a village near Voronezh.

In scientific papers, Bedriaga would sometimes alter his name to agree with the language of the country in which he was publishing. As a result, the following variations are encountered: Jacob Vladimirovich Bedriaga, Johann von Bedriaga, and Jean de Bedriaga.

== Biography ==
He studied sciences at Moscow University under the direction of Anatoli Bogdanov (1834–1896), and afterwards moved to Germany, where he studied at the University of Jena with Ernst Haeckel (1834–1919) and Carl Gegenbaur (1826–1903). In 1875, he obtained his doctorate with a thesis on the urogenital organs of reptiles.

After graduation, Bedriaga continued his research on reptiles with Gegenbaur, and made frequent scientific trips to regions around the Mediterranean. In 1880 he published an important work on Greek herpetology called Die Amphibien und Reptilien Griechenlands. Also, he made occasional visits back to Russia, where he studied collections reported from expeditions to Central Asia, including those of Nikolai Przewalski (1839–1888). In 1881 he moved to Nice for reasons of health, and later lived in Florence, where he died in 1906.

== Eponyms ==
Bedriaga has a handful of herpetological species named after him, including Bedriaga's rock lizard (Archeolacerta bedriagae), Bedriaga's fringe-fingered lizard (Acanthodactylus bedriagai), Bedriaga's skink (Chalcides bedriagai), Bedriaga's wonder gecko (Teratoscincus bedriagai), and the Levant water frog (Pelophylax bedriagae).

== Gallery ==
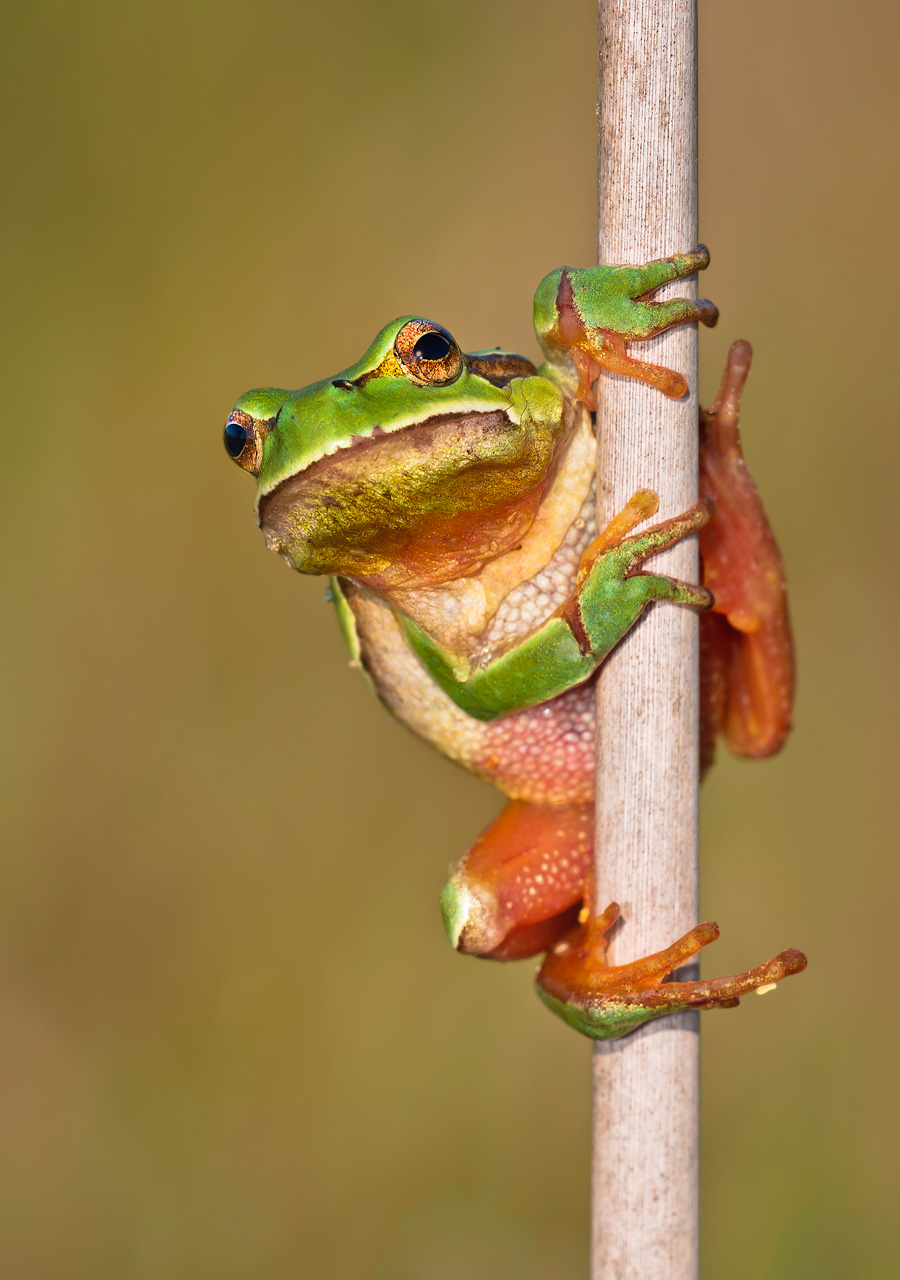
Hyla arborea var. molleri Bedriaga, 1890

== Selected publications ==
- Ueber die Entstehung der Farben bei den Eidechsen (About the emergence of color in lizards), 1874.
- Die Amphibien und Reptilien Griechenlands (The amphibians and reptiles of Greece), 1880.
- Beiträge zur Kenntnis der Amphibien und Reptilien der Fauna von Corsika (Contributions to the knowledge of the amphibians and reptiles of the fauna of Corsica), 1883.
- Beiträge zur Kenntnis der Lacertiden-Familie. (Lacerta, Algiroides, Tropidosaura, Zerzumia und Bettaia) (Contributions to the knowledge of the family Lacertidae), 1886.
- Wissenschaftliche Resultate der von N. M. Przewalski nach Central-Asien unternommenen Reisen (Scientific results of the N.M. Przewalski expedition undertaken in Central Asia), 1898.

== Sources ==
- "Бедряга, Яков Владимирович" . Brockhaus and Efron Encyclopedic Dictionary (in Russian). 1906.
