= Asaccus tangestanensis =

Scientific classification
- Kingdom: Animalia
- Phylum: Chordata
- Class: Reptilia
- Order: Squamata
- Suborder: Gekkota
- Family: Phyllodactylidae
- Genus: Asaccus
- Species: A. tangestanensis

Binomial name
- Asaccus tangestanensis Torki, Ahmadzadeh, Ilgaz, Avci, & Kumlutaş, 2011

Species of lizard

Asaccus tangestanensis is a species of leaf-toed gecko endemic to Iran. This gecko is found in the southern Zagros Mountains in Bushehr Province. It is found in cliffs and caves. The holotype was collected in 2008 and the species is named for Tangestan, the type locality.

It is a medium-sized gecko, though large for an Asaccus species at 49–57 mm (1.9–2.2 in) in length. It has a thin body with elongated limbs and a tail longer than the body. It is distinguished from other species of Asaccus by a combination of the following characteristics:

- Scansor not extending beyond claws,
- Tubercles present on the arms,
- Large, trihedral, keeled tubercles on most of the dorsal part of the body, and
- Thin, long limbs.

It was found co-occurring with several other species of reptiles including Hemidactylus persicus, Laudakia nupta, Trapelus agilis, Tropiocolotes persicus, Coluber sp., Macrovipera lebetina, Echis carinatu, Pristurus rupestris, Cyrtopodion sp., Trapelus agilis, and Heremites auratus.
