= Baluch ground agama =

There are two species of agama named Baluch ground agama:

- Trapelus ruderatus
- Trapelus persicus
