= Olivier's agama =

There are two species of agama named Olivier's agama:

- Trapelus ruderatus
- Trapelus persicus
