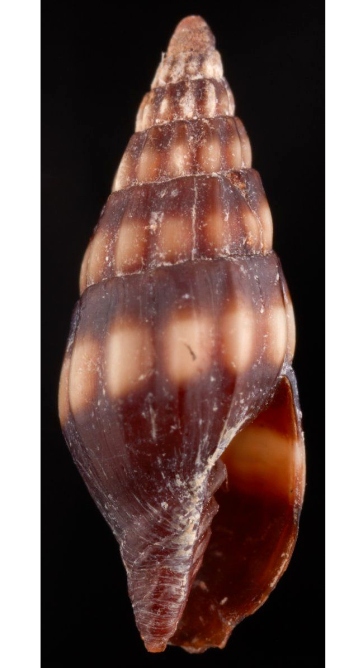
- Shell of Ebenomitra leucaspis (specimen at MNHN, Paris)

Scientific classification
- Kingdom: Animalia
- Phylum: Mollusca
- Class: Gastropoda
- Subclass: Caenogastropoda
- Order: Neogastropoda
- Superfamily: Turbinelloidea
- Family: Costellariidae
- Genus: Ebenomitra
- Species: E. leucaspis

Binomial name
- Ebenomitra leucaspis (Herrmann & Stossier, 2011)

Synonyms
- Vexillum (Pusia) leucaspis Herrmann & Stossier, 2011; Vexillum leucaspis Herrmann & Stossier, 2011 superseded combination

= Ebenomitra leucaspis =

Species of gastropod

Ebenomitra leucaspis is a species of sea snail, a marine gastropod mollusk, belonging to the family Costellariidae, the ribbed miters. It was originally placed in the genus Vexillium, but shifted to Ebenomitra in 2025.

Its name is Latin for "wearing white shields" in reference to the white rectangles found on its shell.

== Description ==
Ebenomitra leucaspis has a dark brown shell of a fusiform shape, with whorl ribs covered in a white rectangle. Columellar folds have a whitish-brown colouration, usually consisting of around 4 folds. The protoconch is 1.5 whorls in size, and the teleoconch is 5 whorls. Each whorl consists of around 12 axial ribs. It is most similar in appearance to Ebenomitra strictecostata, although it only has half the axial ribs. The length of the shell attains 6.7 mm.

== Distribution ==
This marine species occurs off Senegal, specifically in the shallow waters off Dakar. The holotype was found in the sand of Les Almadies.
