= V. tricolor =

V. tricolor may refer to:

- Vanda tricolor, an orchid species found in Laos and from Java to Bali
- Vanellus tricolor, the banded lapwing, a wader species found over most of Australia and Tasmania
- Vexillum tricolor, a small sea snail species
- Viola tricolor, a plant species native to Europe

== See also ==
- Tricolor (disambiguation)
