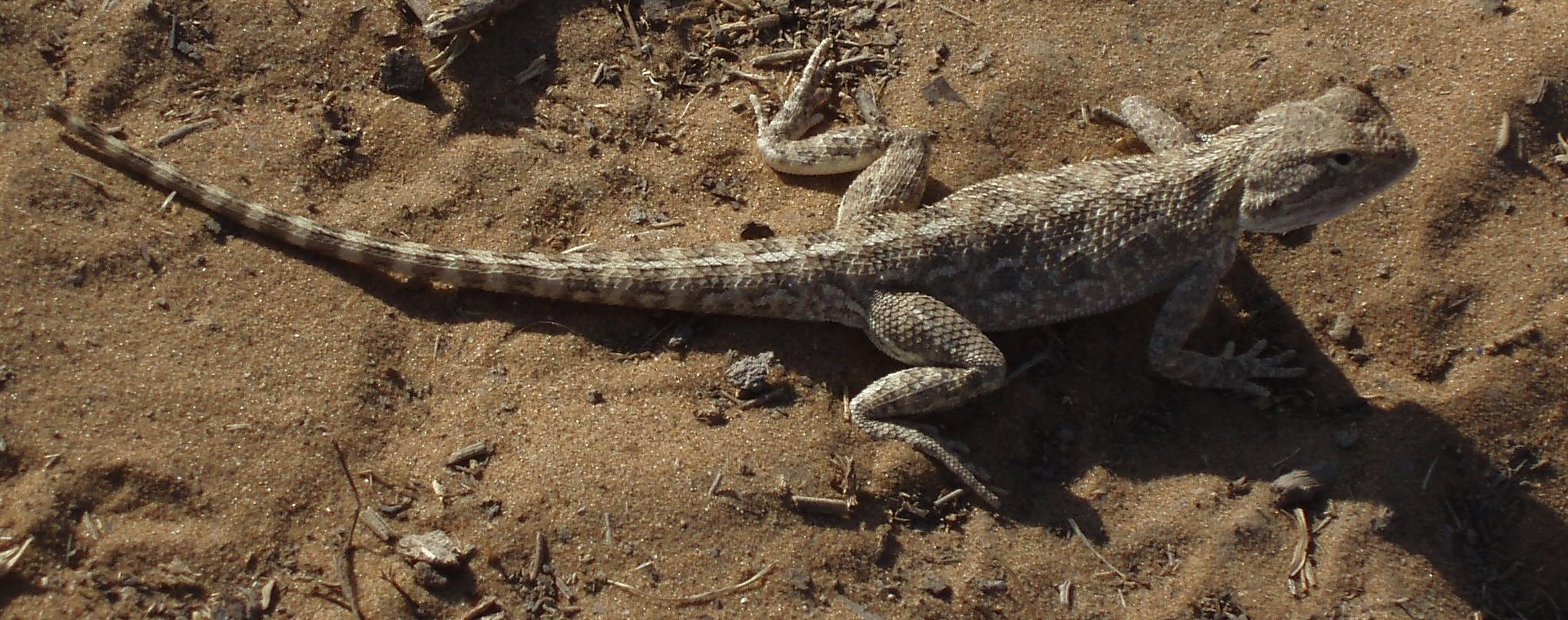
- Trapelus sanguinolentus

Scientific classification
- Kingdom: Animalia
- Phylum: Chordata
- Class: Reptilia
- Order: Squamata
- Suborder: Iguania
- Family: Agamidae
- Subfamily: Agaminae
- Genus: Trapelus; Cuvier, 1817

Species
- 13, see text.

= Trapelus =

Genus of lizards

Trapelus is a genus of Middle Eastern agamid lizards, which contains 13 species.

== Species ==
Listed alphabetically, the species are:

- Trapelus agilis (Olivier, 1807) – brilliant ground agama
- Trapelus agnetae (F. Werner, 1929)
- Trapelus boehmei Wagner, Melville, Wilms & Schmitz, 2011
- Trapelus flavimaculatus Rüppell, 1835 – yellow-spotted agama
- Trapelus megalonyx Günther, 1864 – Afghan ground agama
- Trapelus mutabilis (Merrem, 1820) – Egyptian agama, desert agama
- Trapelus persicus (Blanford, 1881) – Olivier's agama, Baluch ground agama
- Trapelus rubrigularis (Blanford, 1875) – red-throated agama
- Trapelus ruderatus (Olivier, 1804) – Olivier's agama, Baluch ground agama
- Trapelus sanguinolentus (Pallas, 1814) – steppe agama
- Trapelus savignii (A.M.C. Dumeril & Bibron, 1837) – Savigny's agama
- Trapelus schmitzi Wagner & Böhme, 2006 – Schmitz's agama
- Trapelus tournevillei (Lataste, 1880) – Erg agama, Sahara agama

Nota bene: A binomial authority in parentheses indicates that the species was originally described in a genus other than Trapelus.
