= M. carnea =

M. carnea may refer to:

- Mammillaria carnea, a cactus with attractive flowers
- Marginella carnea, a margin shell
- Mitra carnea, a sea snail
- Myelois carnea, a snout moth
- Myriogramme carnea, a red algae
