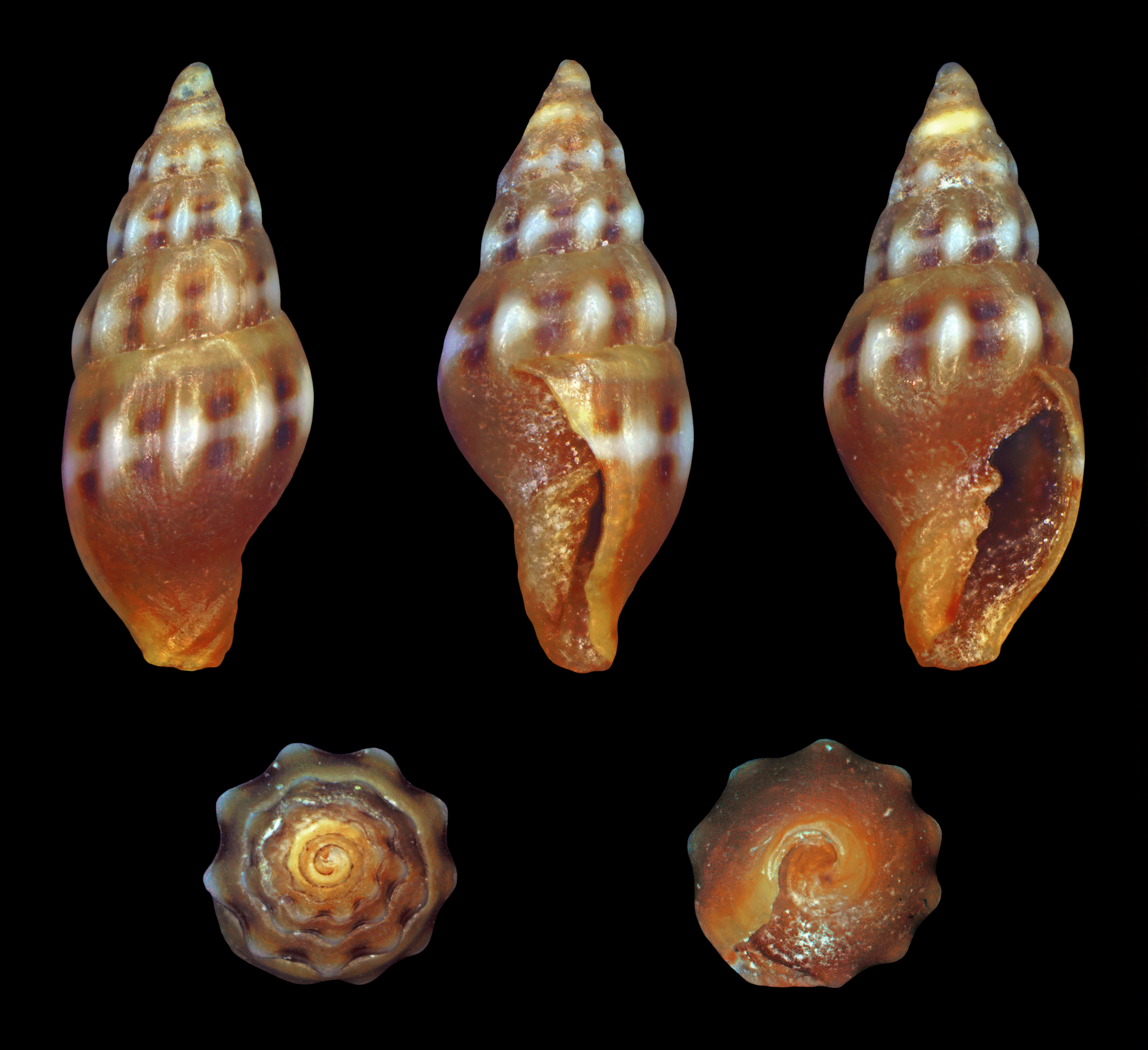
- Shell of Ebenomitra tricolor

Scientific classification
- Kingdom: Animalia
- Phylum: Mollusca
- Class: Gastropoda
- Subclass: Caenogastropoda
- Order: Neogastropoda
- Superfamily: Turbinelloidea
- Family: Costellariidae
- Genus: Ebenomitra; Monterosato, 1917

Type species
- Mitra ebenus Lamarck, 1811

Species
- See text

Synonyms
- Mitra (Ebenomitra) Monterosato, 1917 superseded rank; Pusia (Ebenomitra) Monterosato, 1917 superseded rank; Pusiola Monterosato, 1912 (invalid: junior homonym of Pusiola Wallengren, 1863 [Lepidoptera]; Pusiolina is a replacement name); Pusiolina Cossmann, 1921; Vexillum (Pusiolina) Cossmann, 1921 junior subjective synonym

= Ebenomitra =

Genus of gastropods

Ebenomitra is a genus of sea snails, marine gastropod mollusks in the family Costellariidae.

== Species ==
- Ebenomitra angeloamatii (Amati, 2024)
- † Ebenomitra brebioni (Landau, Ceulemans & Van Dingenen, 2019)
- Ebenomitra ebenus (Lamarck, 1811)
- † Ebenomitra ellenae Landau & Harzhauser, 2024
- † Ebenomitra frumentum (Bellardi, 1887)
- Ebenomitra granum (Forbes, 1844)
- † Ebenomitra januszkiewiczi (Friedberg, 1928)
- Ebenomitra leucaspis (Herrmann & Stossier, 2011)
- † Ebenomitra leucozona (Andrzejowski, 1830)
- † Ebenomitra pseudoplicatula (Landau, Ceulemans & Van Dingenen, 2019)
- † Ebenomitra pseudopyramidella (O. Boettger, 1906)
- † Ebenomitra renauleauensis (Landau, Ceulemans & Van Dingenen, 2019)
- Ebenomitra savignyi (Payraudeau, 1826)
- † Ebenomitra similata (Millet, 1865)
- Ebenomitra strictecostata (Maltzan, 1884)
- † Ebenomitra sublaevis (Landau, Ceulemans & Van Dingenen, 2019)
- Ebenomitra tricolor (Gmelin, 1791)
