= Lycée Thibaut de Champagne =

Senior high school in France

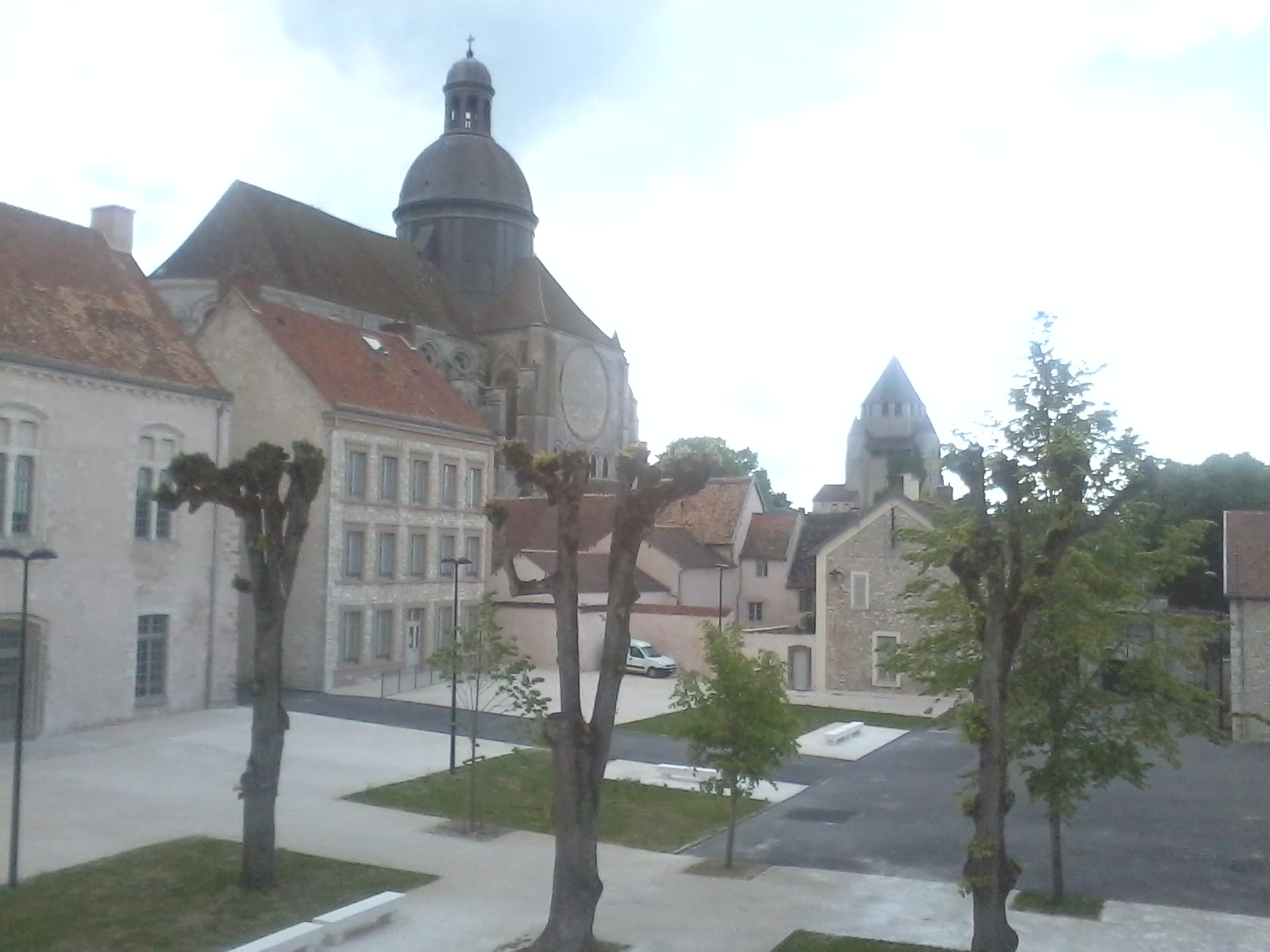
View from the administrative building

Lycée Thibaut de Champagne is a senior high school in Provins, Seine-et-Marne, France, in the Paris metropolitan area. It is under the authority of the Académie de Créteil.

In February 2026, a case of tuberculosis was identified at the school, and the government immediately set up a screening centre there.
