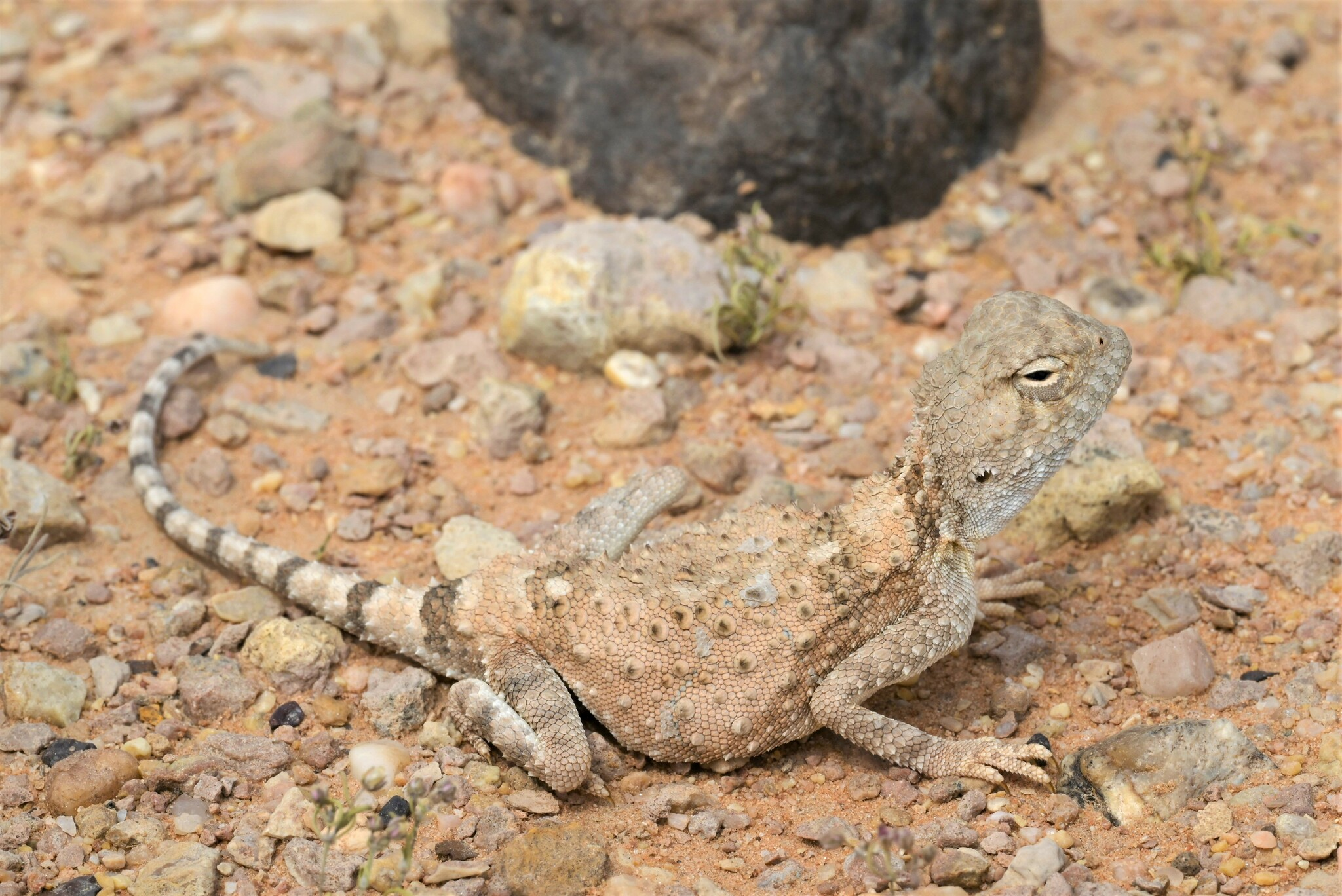

Conservation status
- Least Concern (IUCN 3.1)

Scientific classification
- Kingdom: Animalia
- Phylum: Chordata
- Class: Reptilia
- Order: Squamata
- Suborder: Iguania
- Family: Agamidae
- Genus: Trapelus
- Species: T. agnetae

Binomial name
- Trapelus agnetae (Werner, 1929)

= Trapelus agnetae =

Species of lizard

Trapelus agnetae is a species of agama found in Israel and Jordan.
