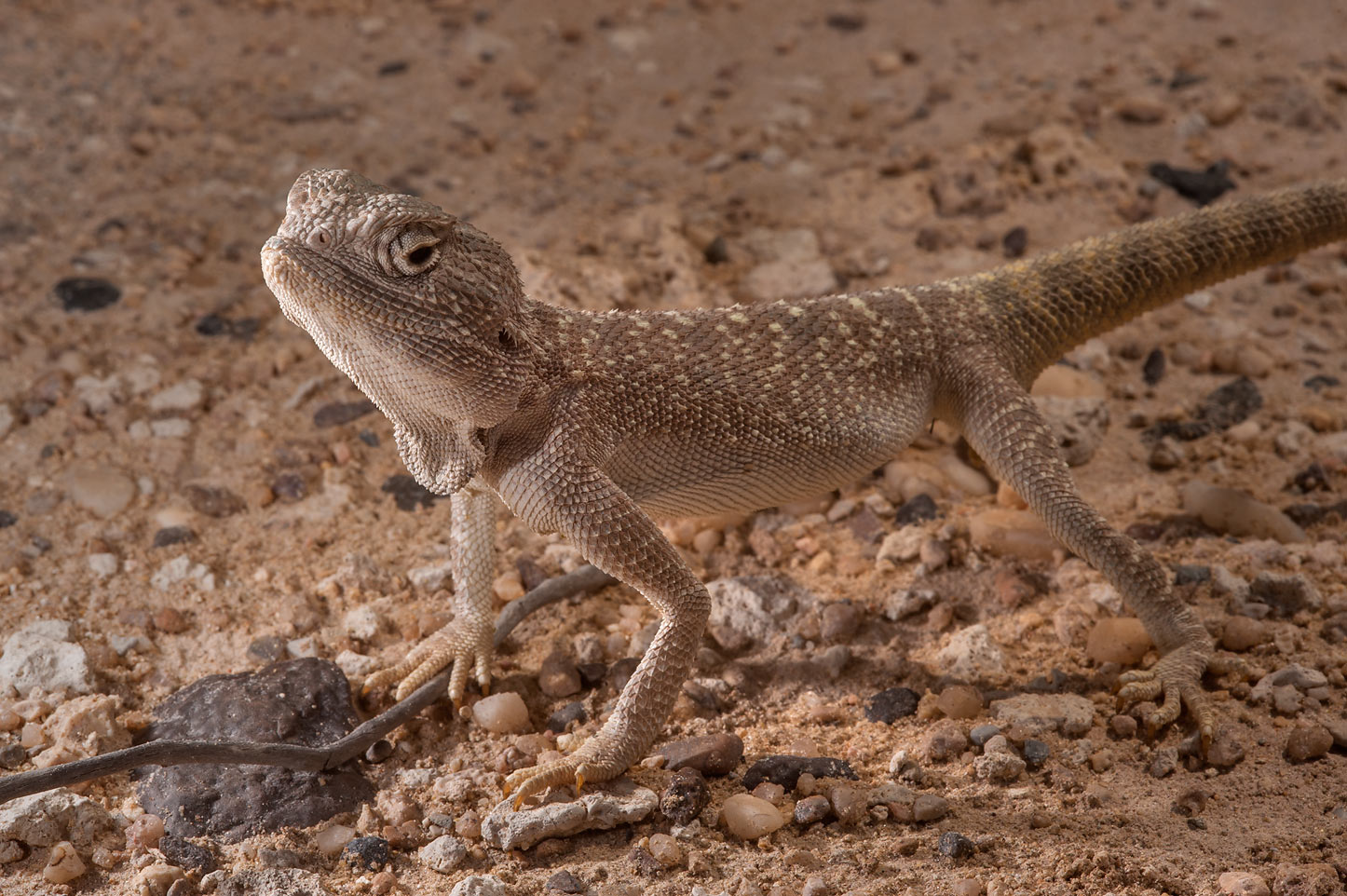

Conservation status
- Least Concern (IUCN 3.1)

Scientific classification
- Kingdom: Animalia
- Phylum: Chordata
- Class: Reptilia
- Order: Squamata
- Suborder: Iguania
- Family: Agamidae
- Genus: Trapelus
- Species: T. flavimaculatus

Binomial name
- Trapelus flavimaculatus Rüppell, 1835

Synonyms
- Trapelus flavimaculatus Rüppell, 1835; Agama flavimaculata — Anderson, 1896; Agama jayakari Anderson, 1896; Trapelus flavimaculatus — Joger, 1987

= Yellow-spotted agama =

Species of lizard

The yellow-spotted agama (Trapelus flavimaculatus) is a common species of lizard in the family Agamidae. The species is endemic to the Middle East.

== Geographic range ==
T. flavimaculatus is found in arid regions of the Arabian Peninsula in Oman, Qatar, Saudi Arabia, United Arab Emirates, and Yemen.

== Habitat ==
The yellow-spotted agama inhabits sandy or gravelly areas of desert and shrubland, at altitudes from sea level to 1,200 m (3,900 ft).

== Diet ==
T. flavimaculatus feeds mostly on insects.

== Behaviour ==
The yellow-spotted agama is diurnal, and climbs on bushes to bask.

== Reproduction ==
T. flavimaculatus is oviparous. Clutch size is four to six eggs.

== Description ==
Males of T. flavimaculatus are generally known by the remarkable blue colour on the ventral surface of the neck.

== Gallery ==
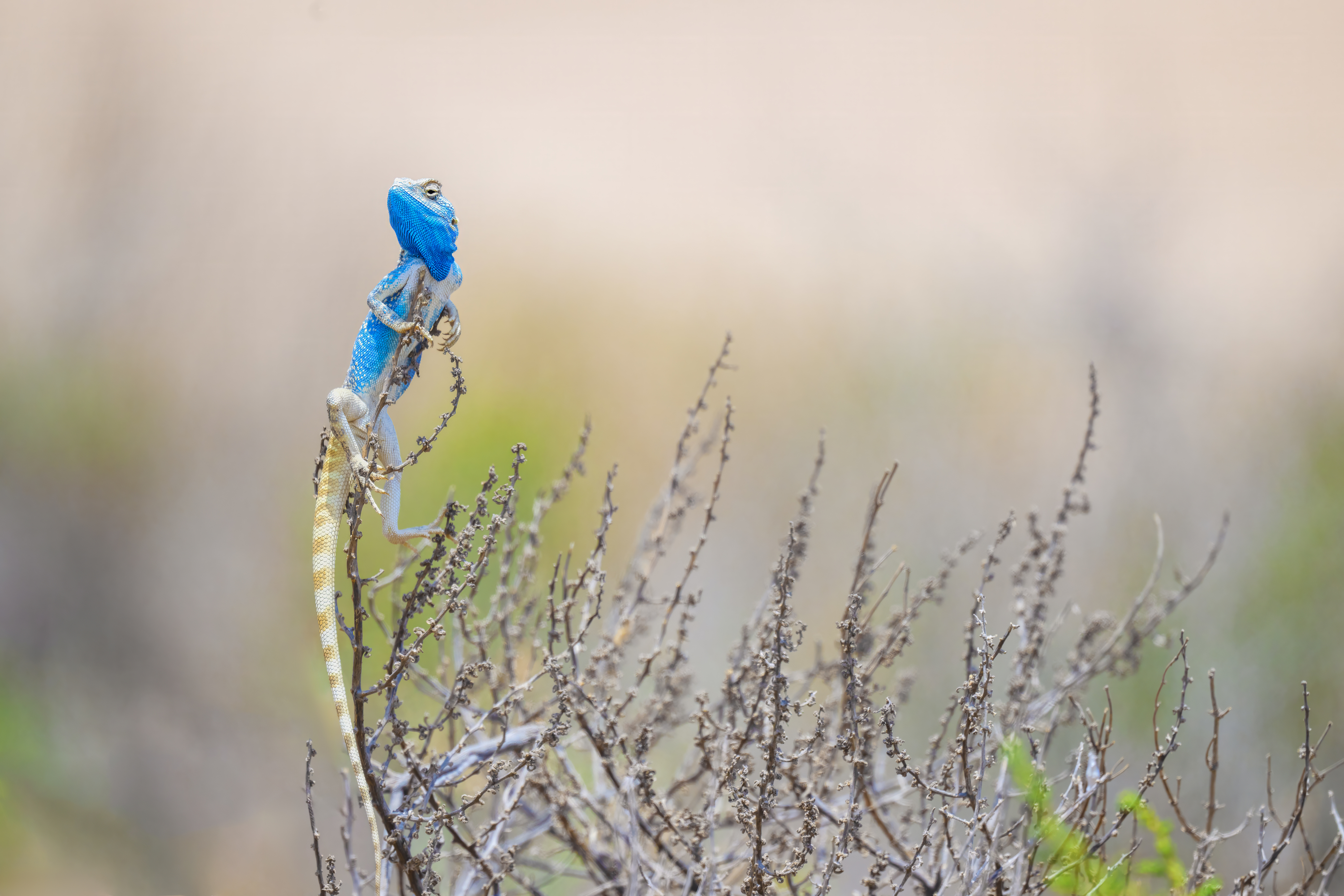
Yellow-spotted Agama in Kuwait

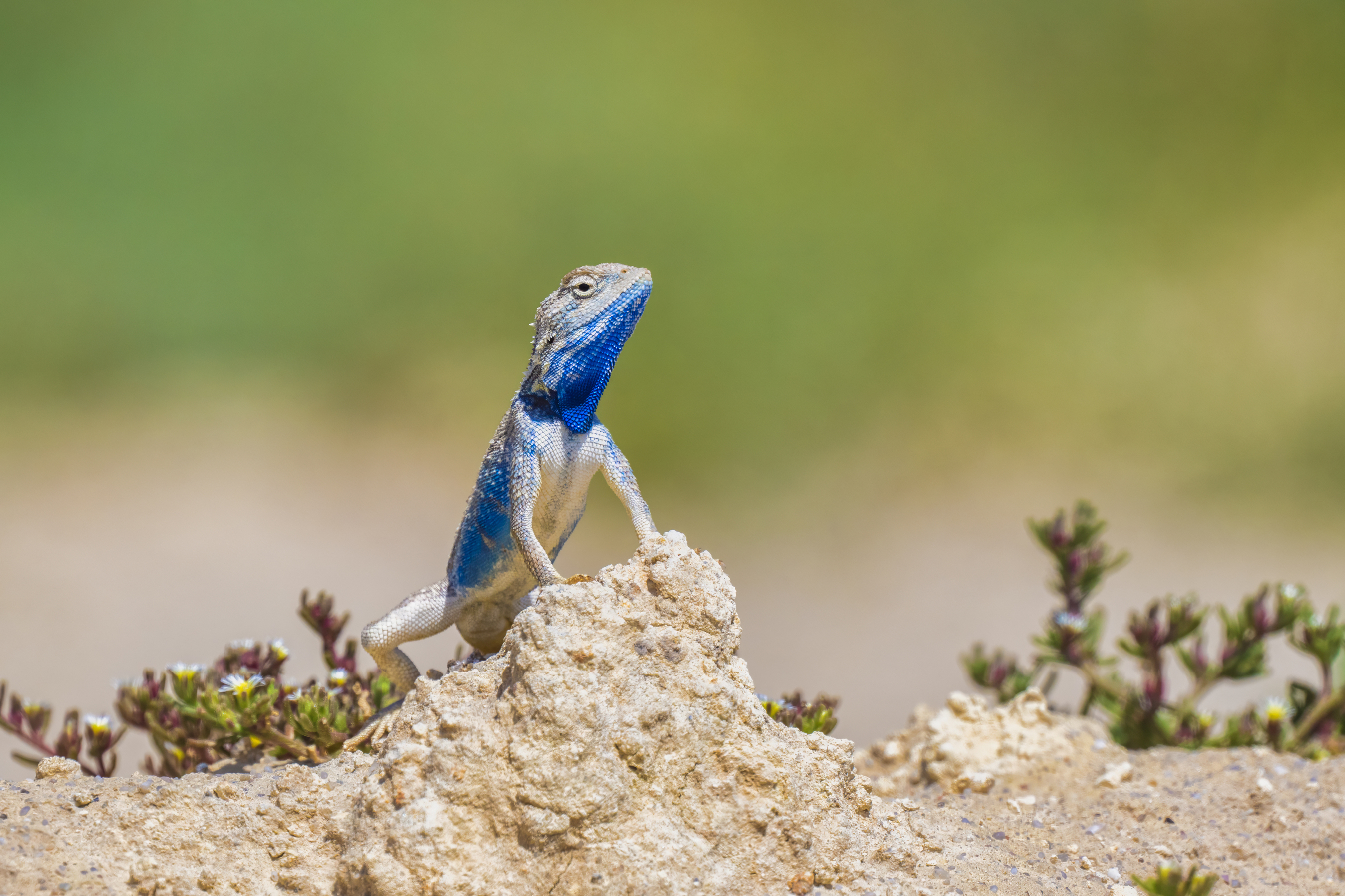
Yellow-spotted Agama in Kuwait
