= Trapelus megalonyx =

Conservation status
- Least Concern (IUCN 3.1)

Scientific classification
- Domain: Eukaryota
- Kingdom: Animalia
- Phylum: Chordata
- Class: Reptilia
- Order: Squamata
- Suborder: Iguania
- Family: Agamidae
- Genus: Trapelus
- Species: T. megalonyx

Binomial name
- Trapelus megalonyx Günther, 1864

Species of lizard

Trapelus megalonyx, the Afghan ground agama, is a species of agama found in Pakistan, Afghanistan, Iran, and India.
