= Erg agama =

Conservation status
- Least Concern (IUCN 3.1)

Scientific classification
- Kingdom: Animalia
- Phylum: Chordata
- Class: Reptilia
- Order: Squamata
- Suborder: Iguania
- Family: Agamidae
- Genus: Trapelus
- Species: T. tournevillei

Binomial name
- Trapelus tournevillei (Lataste, 1880)
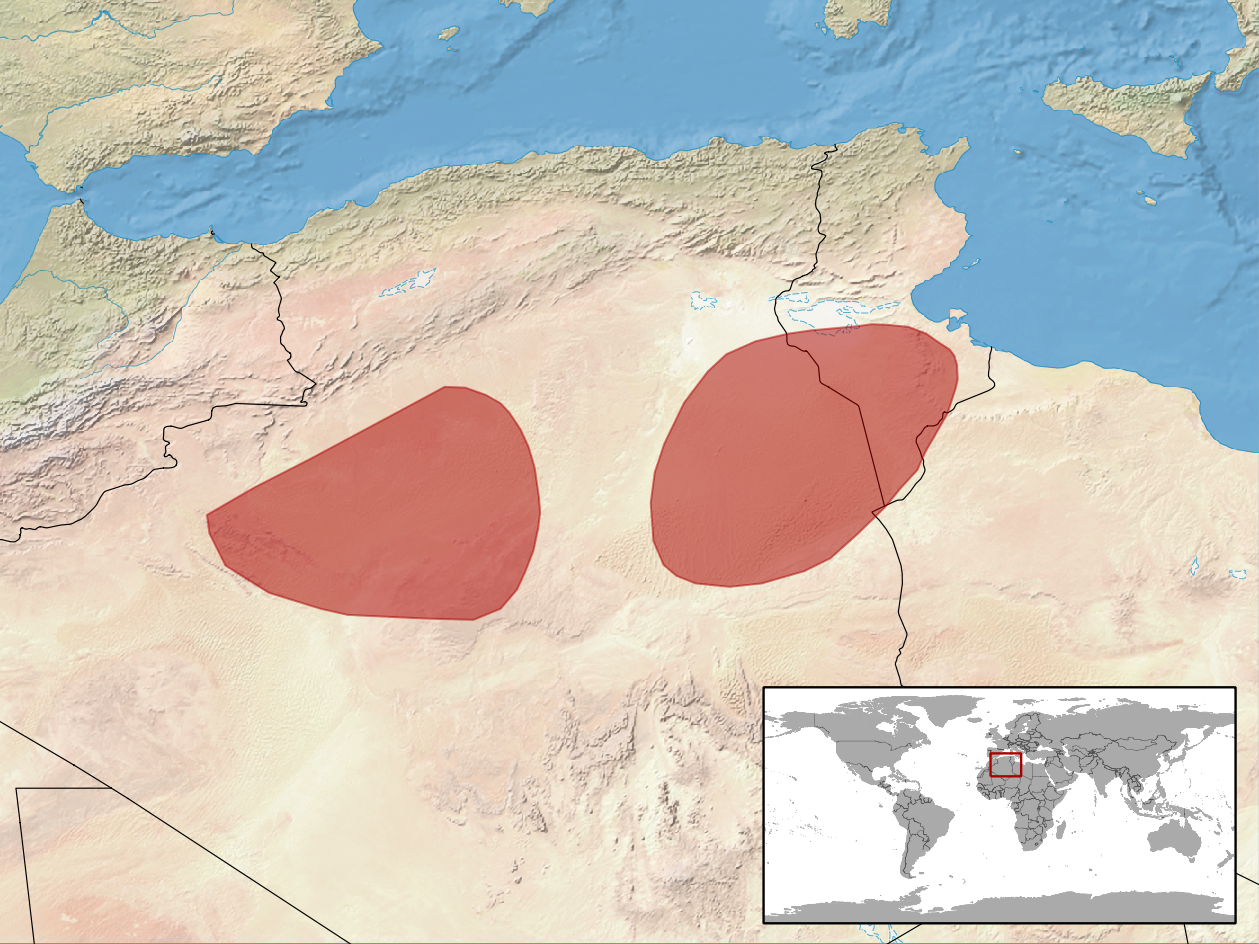

Synonyms
- Agama tournevillei Lataste, 1880; Trapelus tournevillei — Schleich, Kästle & Kabisch, 1996

Species of lizard

The erg agama (Trapelus tournevillei), also commonly known as the Sahara agama, is a species of lizard in the family Agamidae. The species is endemic to North Africa.

== Etymology ==
The specific name, tournevillei, is in honor of French herpetologist Albert Tourneville.

== Geographic range ==
T. tournevillei is found in Algeria and Tunisia.

== Habitat ==
The natural habitat of T. tournevillei is hot deserts.

== Reproduction ==
T. tournevillei is oviparous.

== Conservation status ==
T. tournevillei is threatened by habitat loss.
