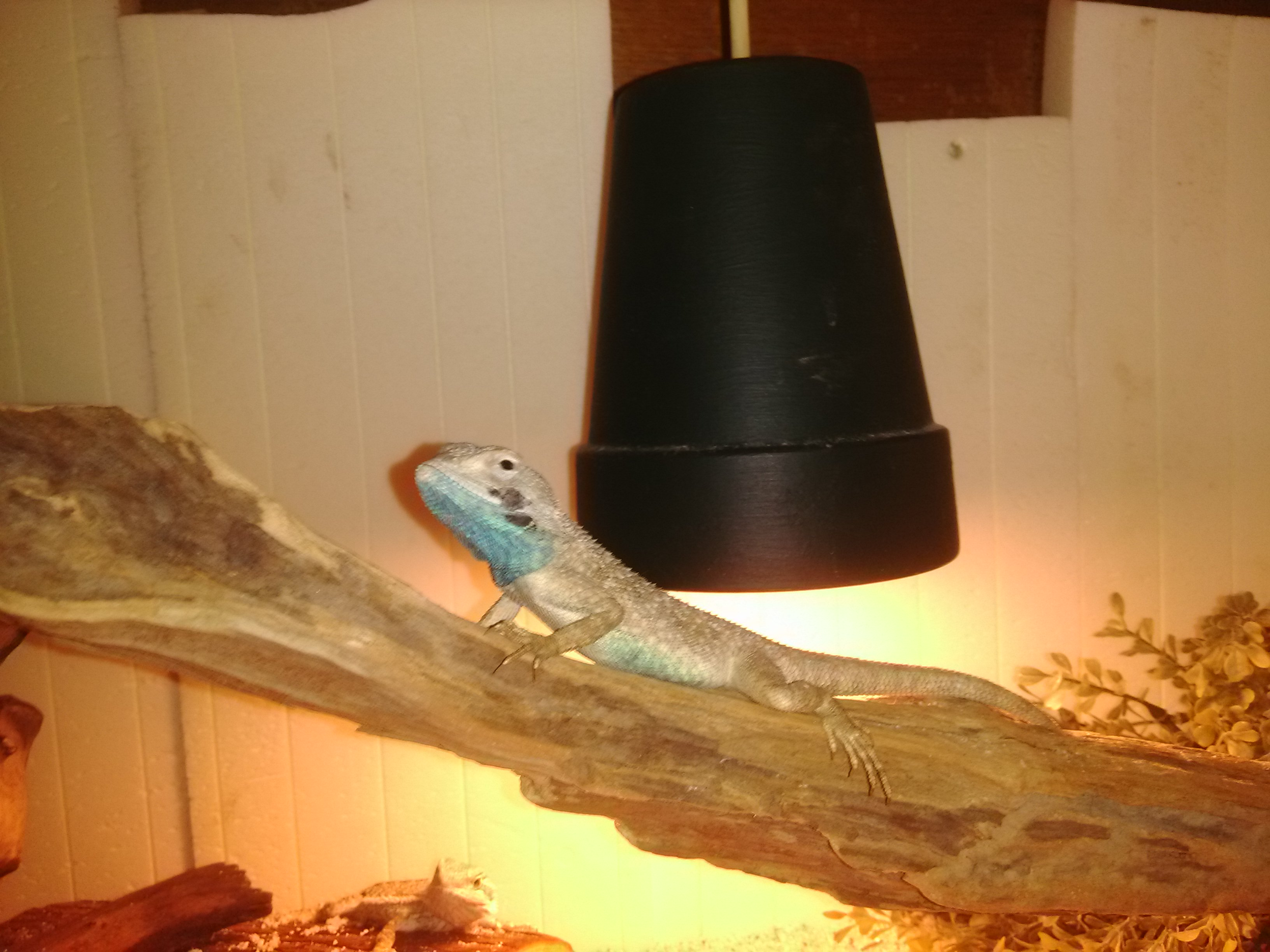

Conservation status
- Data Deficient (IUCN 3.1)

Scientific classification
- Kingdom: Animalia
- Phylum: Chordata
- Class: Reptilia
- Order: Squamata
- Suborder: Iguania
- Family: Agamidae
- Genus: Trapelus
- Species: T. schmitzi

Binomial name
- Trapelus schmitzi Wagner & Böhme, 2006

= Trapelus schmitzi =

Species of lizard

Trapelus schmitzi, also known as Schmitz' agama, is a species of agama. It is found in Chad and Algeria. It is named after Andreas Schmitz, German herpetologist.
