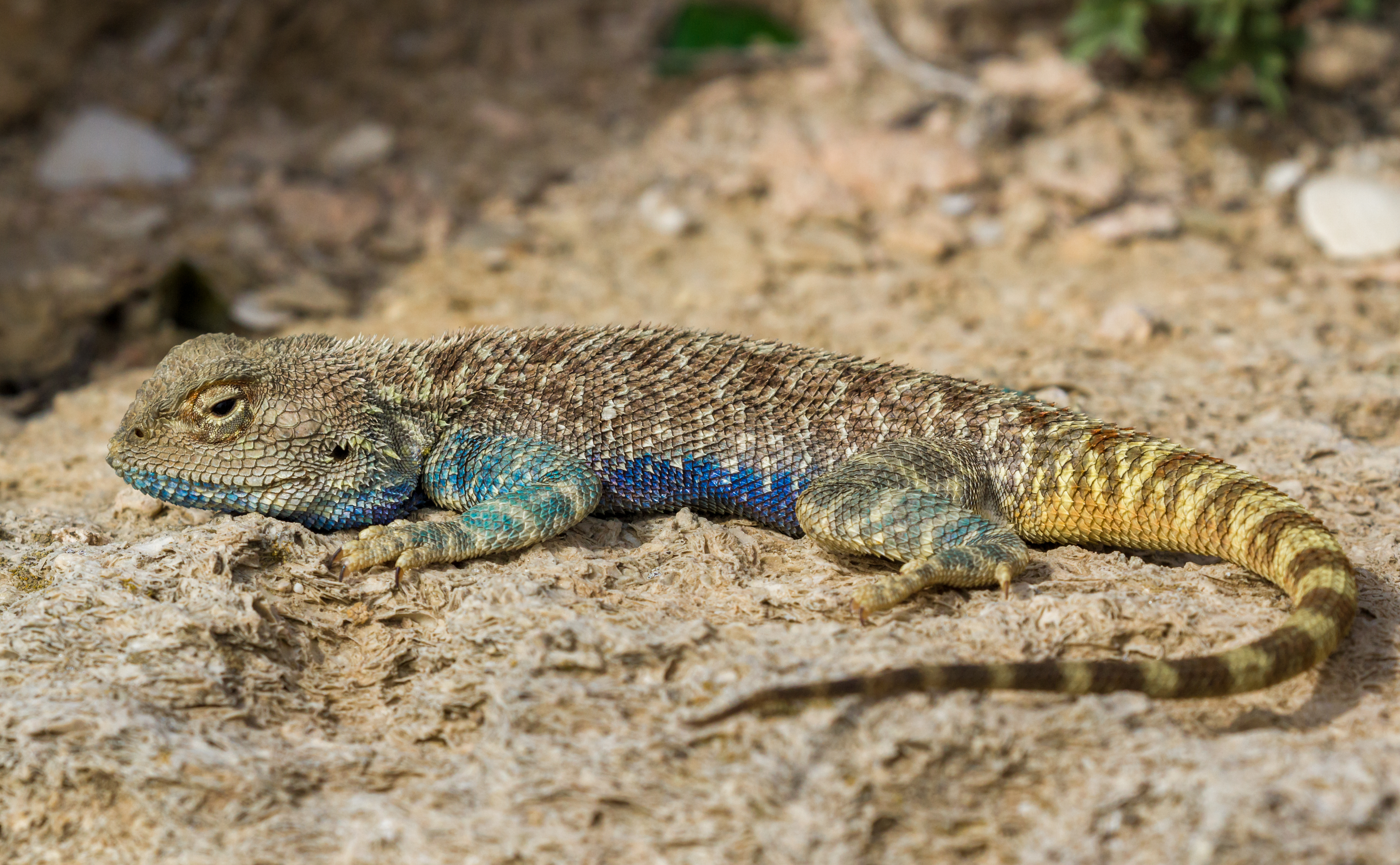

Conservation status
- Least Concern (IUCN 3.1)

Scientific classification
- Kingdom: Animalia
- Phylum: Chordata
- Class: Reptilia
- Order: Squamata
- Suborder: Iguania
- Family: Agamidae
- Genus: Trapelus
- Species: T. sanguinolentus

Binomial name
- Trapelus sanguinolentus (Pallas, 1814)

= Trapelus sanguinolentus =

Species of lizard

Trapelus sanguinolentus, the steppe agama, is a species of agama found in Russia, Kazakhstan, Kyrgyzstan, Tajikistan, Iran, Afghanistan, and China.
