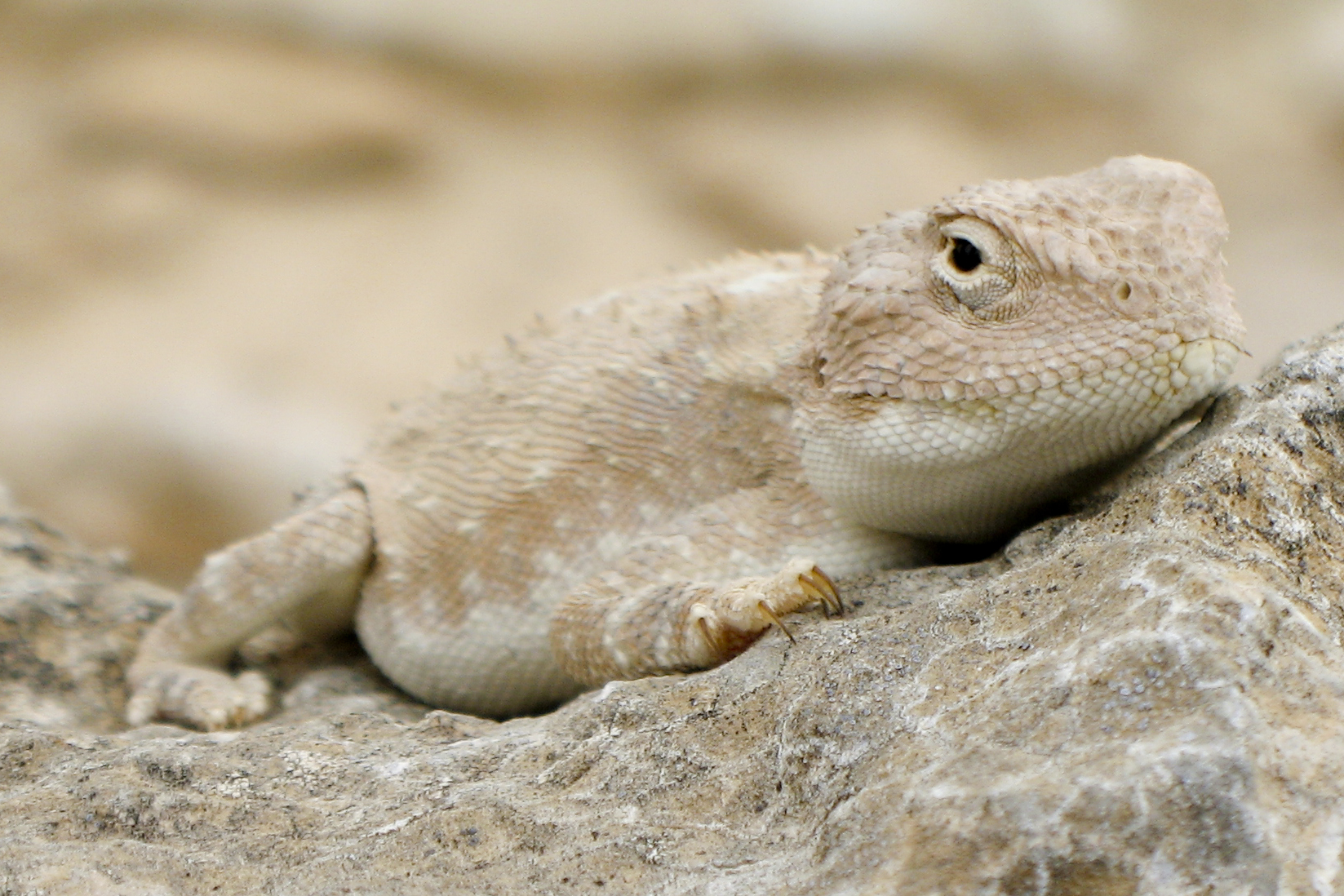

Conservation status
- Least Concern (IUCN 3.1)

Scientific classification
- Kingdom: Animalia
- Phylum: Chordata
- Class: Reptilia
- Order: Squamata
- Suborder: Iguania
- Family: Agamidae
- Genus: Trapelus
- Species: T. mutabilis

Binomial name
- Trapelus mutabilis (Merrem, 1820)

= Trapelus mutabilis =

Species of lizard

Trapelus mutabilis, the desert agama, is a species of agama found in Morocco, Mauritania, Western Sahara, Algeria, Tunisia, Libya, Egypt, Mali, Iraq, Chad, Sudan, and Saudi Arabia.
