= Marie Jules César Savigny =

French zoologist

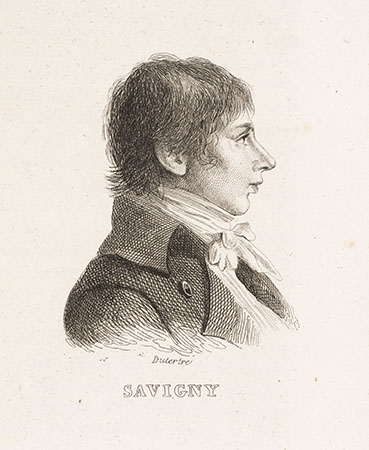
- Born: 5 April 1777; Provins
- Died: 5 October 1851 (aged 74); Gally, Saint-Cyr-l'École
- Scientific career
- Fields: Zoology
- Workplaces: Muséum national d'histoire naturelle
- Author abbrev. (zoology): Savigny

Marie Jules César Lelorgne de Savigny (French: [maʁi ʒyl sezaʁ ləlɔʁɲ də saviɲi]; 5 April 1777 – 5 October 1851) was a French zoologist and naturalist who served on Emperor Napoleon's Egypt expedition in 1798. He published descriptions of numerous taxa and was among the first to propose that the mouth-parts of insects are derived from the jointed legs of segmented arthropods.

== Life and work ==
Savigny was born in Provins, France to Jean-Jacques Lelorgne de Savigny, and Françoise Josèphe de Barbaud. He was educated at the Collège des Oratoriens in classical languages with aspirations to become a priest, and also learned a bit of botany and microscope usage. He then studied with a local apothecary when he passed an exam to study in Paris at the École de Santé (school of health) in 1793. He also attended lectures at the Muséum d'Histoire Naturelle, where he was noticed by Lamarck. Georges Cuvier suggested that he join an expedition. In 1798 he travelled to Egypt under the sponsorship of Emperor Napoleon as part of the French scientific expedition to that country, and returned in 1802. He then contributed to the publication of the findings of the expedition from 1809 (Description de l'Égypte; published more fully in 1822). He wrote about the fauna in the Mediterranean Sea and the Red Sea.

=== Education and travel to Egypt ===
At age 16, Savigny traveled from his home of Provins, in the department of Seine et Marne, to Paris to finish his studies. Being very interested in botany, he attended lectures at the Muséum national d'histoire naturelle with Jean-Baptiste Lamarck and Georges Cuvier. Cuvier suggested to Napoleon that the 21-year-old Savigny should follow him as zoologist to Egypt. Savigny became responsible for studying invertebrates, while Étienne Geoffroy Saint-Hilaire took care of the vertebrates. After returning to Paris, in 1802, Savigny started to work on the large collections from Egypt, producing a number of manuscripts and plates. In 1805 he published Histoire naturelle et mythologique de l'ibis (Natural and mythological history of the ibis).

As a botanist he described the genus Bruguiera (Savigny in Lam. 1798) and numerous plants including algae.

=== Later years ===
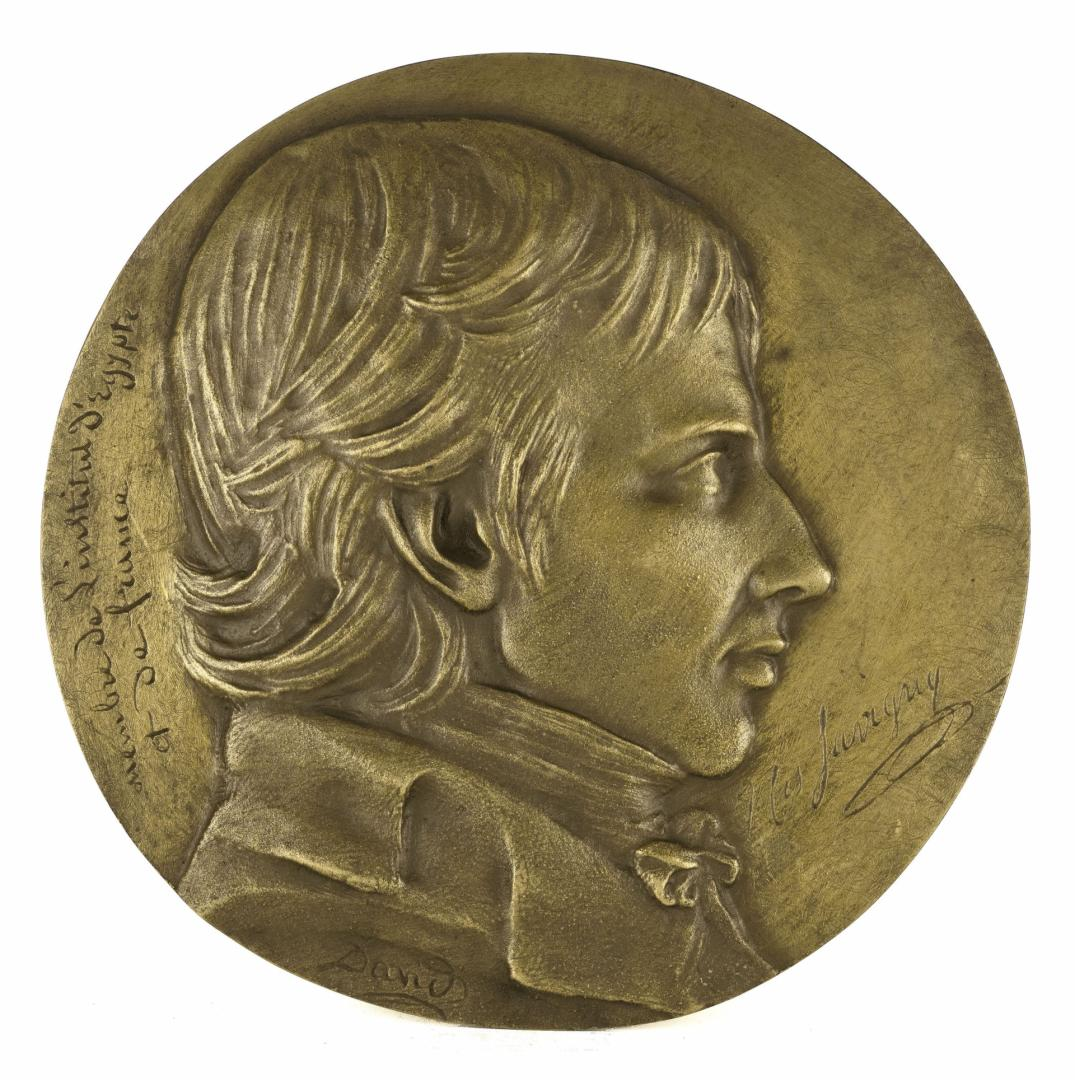
Commemorative medallion by David d'Angers

By 1817, Savigny's eyesight had deteriorated, and he suffered from a nervous affliction and had to stop working for a number of years. Between 1816 and 1820 he published the important Mémoires sur les animaux sans vertèbres ("Dissertations on the invertebrate animals"). He had examined flowers and their parts as a botanist and applied the same approach to the details of insects. He compared the mouthparts of lepidoptera, those of crustaceans, arthropods (like the horseshoe crab) and came up with the theory (Theorie de la bouche) that there were homologies among them. He suggested in 1816 that there was a common plan. This idea was influenced others including Geoffroy Saint-Hilaire. After he returned to work in 1822, his eyesight continued to worsen, and by 1824 he became more-or-less blind, with terrible "optical hallucinations". Victor Audouin offered to complete Savigny's work, but Savigny refused to part with the original artwork. Savigny was elected member of the Academy of Science on 30 July 1821. From 1824 until his death, he lived a reclusive life in Versailles.

== Eponymy ==
Taxa named in honor of Savigny include:

=== Genera ===
- Savignya (family Brassicaceae) DC.
- Savignyella DC.
- Savignia Blackwall, 1833

=== Species ===
- Acanthodactylus savignyi Audouin, 1809
- Anachis savignyi Moazzo, 1939
- Ciona savignyi Herdman, 1882
- Diadema savignyi (Audouin, 1809)
- Embia savignyi Westwood, 1837
- Goniopora savignyi (Dana, 1846)
- Hyla savignyi Audouin, 1827
- Leptochelia savignyi (Krøyer, 1842)
- Loimia savignyi M'Intosh, 1885
- Microcosmus savignyi Monniot, 1962
- Ophiactis savignyi J. Müller & Troschel
- Planaxis savignyi Deshayes, 1844
- Pusia savignyi (Payraudeau, 1826)
- Sepia savignyi H. de Blainville, 1827
- Siderastrea savignyana H. Milne Edwards & Haime, 1850
- Dynamenella savignii H. Milne Edwards, 1840
- Thais savignyi (Deshayes, 1844)
- Trapelus savignii A.M.C. Duméril & Bibron, 1837
- Trididemnum savignii (Herdman, 1886)

=== Synonyms and rejected names ===
- Savignya Desor, 1855
- Vexillum savignyi (Payraudeau, 1826)
