= Savignya =

Scientific classification
- Kingdom: Plantae
- Clade: Tracheophytes
- Clade: Angiosperms
- Clade: Eudicots
- Clade: Rosids
- Order: Brassicales
- Family: Brassicaceae
- Genus: Savignya
- Species: S. parviflora

Binomial name
- Savignya parviflora (Delile) Webb

Synonyms
- Farsetia parviflora (Delile) Spreng.; Lunaria parviflora Delile; Savignya aegyptiaca DC.; Savignya parviflora subsp. aegyptiaca Maire

Species of flowering plant

Savignya is a monotypic genus of flowering plants belonging to the family Brassicaceae. It only contains one known species, Savignya parviflora (Delile) Webb

It has three accepted subspecies;

- Savignya parviflora subsp. globosa Jafri - Libya
- Savignya parviflora subsp. longistyla (Boiss. & Reut.) Maire – Morocco to Libya
- Savignya parviflora subsp. parviflora - Algeria to southwestern Pakistan

Its native range is Northern Africa (within Algeria, Egypt, Libya, Morocco and Tunisia) to Pakistan and the Arabian Peninsula (Afghanistan, the Gulf States, Iran, Iraq, Kuwait, Oman, Palestine, Saudi Arabia and the Sinai Peninsula).

The genus name of Savignya is in honour of Marie Jules César Savigny (1777–1851), a French zoologist. The Latin specific epithet of parviflora means "with small flowers". The genus was first described and published in Mém. Mus. Hist. Nat. Vol.7 on page 231 in 1821. The species was first published in Fragm. Fl. Aethiop.-Aegypt. on page 14 in 1854.
