= Ebenomitra angeloamatii =

Scientific classification
- Kingdom: Animalia
- Phylum: Mollusca
- Class: Gastropoda
- Subclass: Caenogastropoda
- Order: Neogastropoda
- Superfamily: Turbinelloidea
- Family: Costellariidae
- Genus: Ebenomitra
- Species: E. angeloamatii

Binomial name
- Ebenomitra angeloamatii (Amati, 2024)

Synonyms
- Pusia (Ebenomitra) angeloamatii Amati, 2024; Pusia angeloamatii Amati, 2024 ·superseded combination

Species of gastropod

Ebenomitra angeloamatii is a species of sea snail, a marine gastropod mollusk, in the family Costellariidae, the ribbed miters.

== Description ==
The length of the shell attains 6.9 mm, its diameter 3 mm.

== Distribution ==
This species occurs off Kaş in the Turkish part of the Mediterranean Sea.
