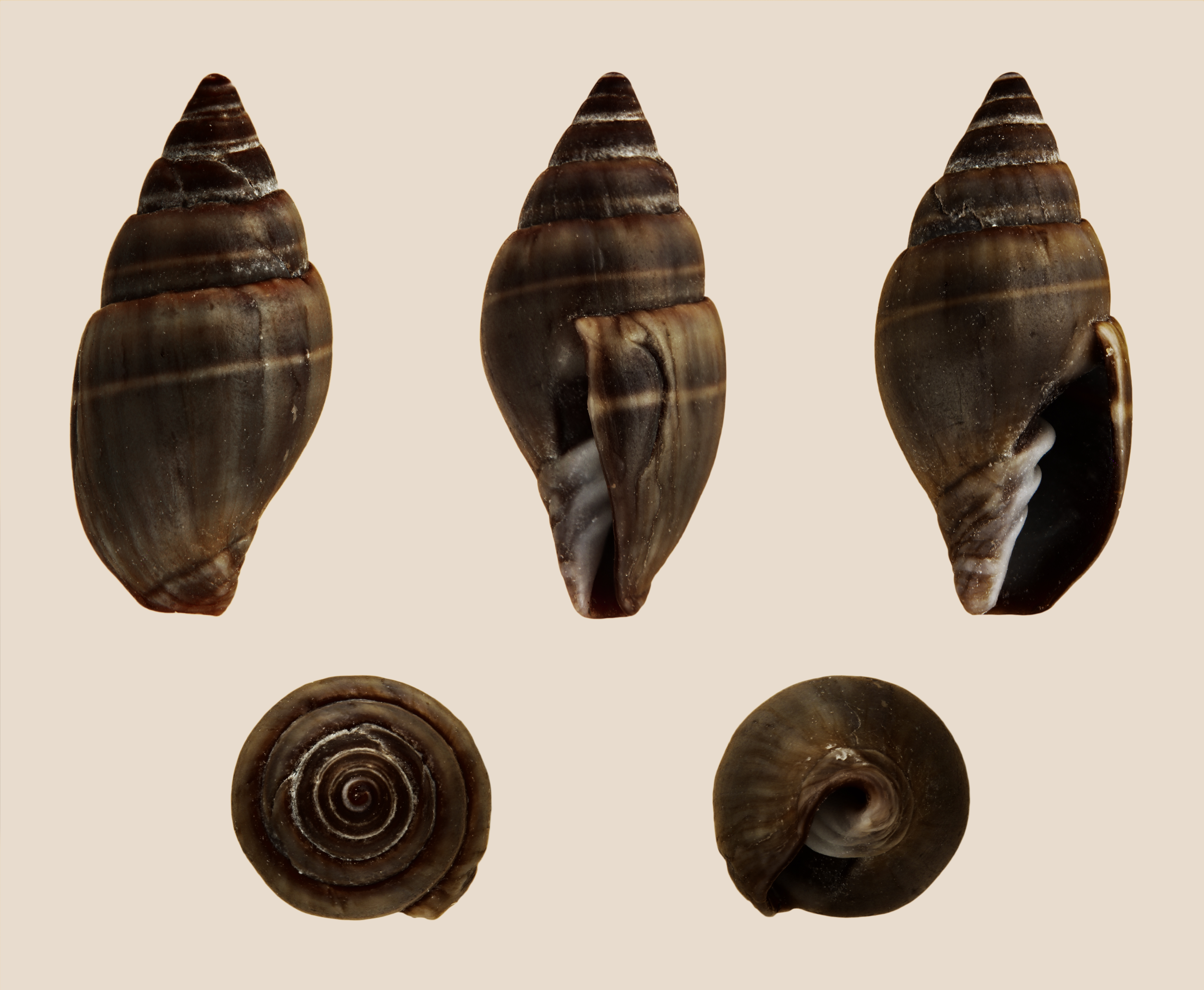
- Shell of Ebenomitra ebenus

Scientific classification
- Kingdom: Animalia
- Phylum: Mollusca
- Class: Gastropoda
- Subclass: Caenogastropoda
- Order: Neogastropoda
- Superfamily: Turbinelloidea
- Family: Costellariidae
- Genus: Ebenomitra
- Species: E. ebenus

Binomial name
- Ebenomitra ebenus (Lamarck, 1811)

Synonyms
- Mitra (Uromitra) ebenus Lamarck, 1811 superseded combination; Mitra biplicata Risso, 1826; Mitra bourguignati Locard, 1891; Mitra caffra Scacchi, 1836; Mitra carna Nardo, 1847; Mitra congesta Locard, 1886; Mitra cordierii Maravigna, 1853; Mitra cornicula (Linnaeus, 1758) sensu Risso, 1826 misapplication; Mitra costulata Risso, 1826; Mitra defrancii Payraudeau, 1826; Mitra ebenina Locard, 1886; Mitra ebenus Lamarck, 1811; Mitra ebenus haifensis Nordsieck, 1982; Mitra ebenus var. costata Weinkauff, 1868; Mitra ebenus var. inflata Bucquoy, Dautzenberg & Dollfus, 1883 junior subjective synonym; Mitra ebenus var. laevigata Weinkauff, 1868; Mitra ebenus var. plicatula (Brocchi, 1814) junior subjective synonym; Mitra gracilis Locard, 1890; Mitra littoralis Risso, 1826; Mitra plicatuliformis Locard, 1891; Mitra plumbea Lamarck, 1811; Mitra servaini Locard, 1890; Mitra subpyramidella Locard, 1891; Mitra tunetana Pallary, 1903; Pusia (Ebenomitra) ebenus (Lamarck, 1811); Pusia ebenus (Lamarck, 1811) superseded combination; Turricula (Uromitra) ebenus (Lamarck, 1811); Turricula (Uromitra) ebenus var. nigra Pallary, 1900; Uromitra blanci Pallary, 1912; Uromitra ebenus (Lamarck, 1811); Uromitra ebenus var. totanigra Pallary, 1912; Vexillum (Pusia) ebenus (Lamarck, 1811); Vexillum ebenus (Lamarck, 1811); Vexillum gervilli B.C.M. Payraudeau, 1827

= Ebenomitra ebenus =

Species of gastropod

Ebenomitra ebenus, common names brown mitre, ivory mitre, is a species of sea snail, a marine gastropod mollusk, in the family Costellariidae, the ribbed miters.

== Description ==
The shell size varies between 20 mm and 36 mm.

(Original description in French) This is a small, smooth shell with an oval and pointed shape, featuring only two or three transverse and oblique ridges at its base. It is ebony black, but just below each suture, there is a transverse white line that is clearly visible only in younger specimens. The upper edge of each whorl flattens slightly to form a small spiral shelf. Additionally, there are four folds on the columella, the lowest of which is very small.

== Distribution ==
This species is distributed in West European waters and in the Mediterranean Sea.
