= Provins =

- Subprefecture and commune
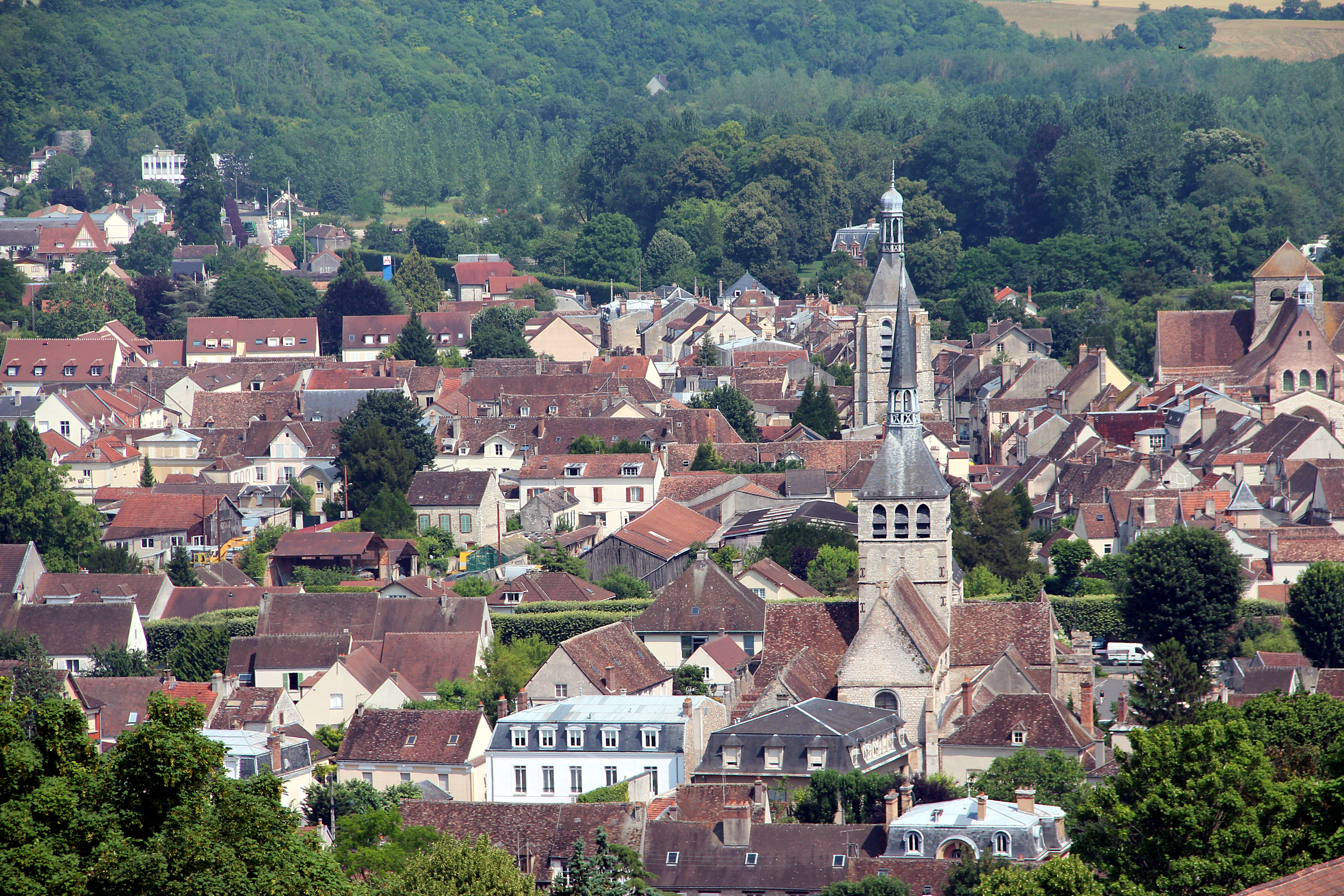
- The historic center of the lower town seen from the Caesar tower.

- Coat of arms
- Location of Provins
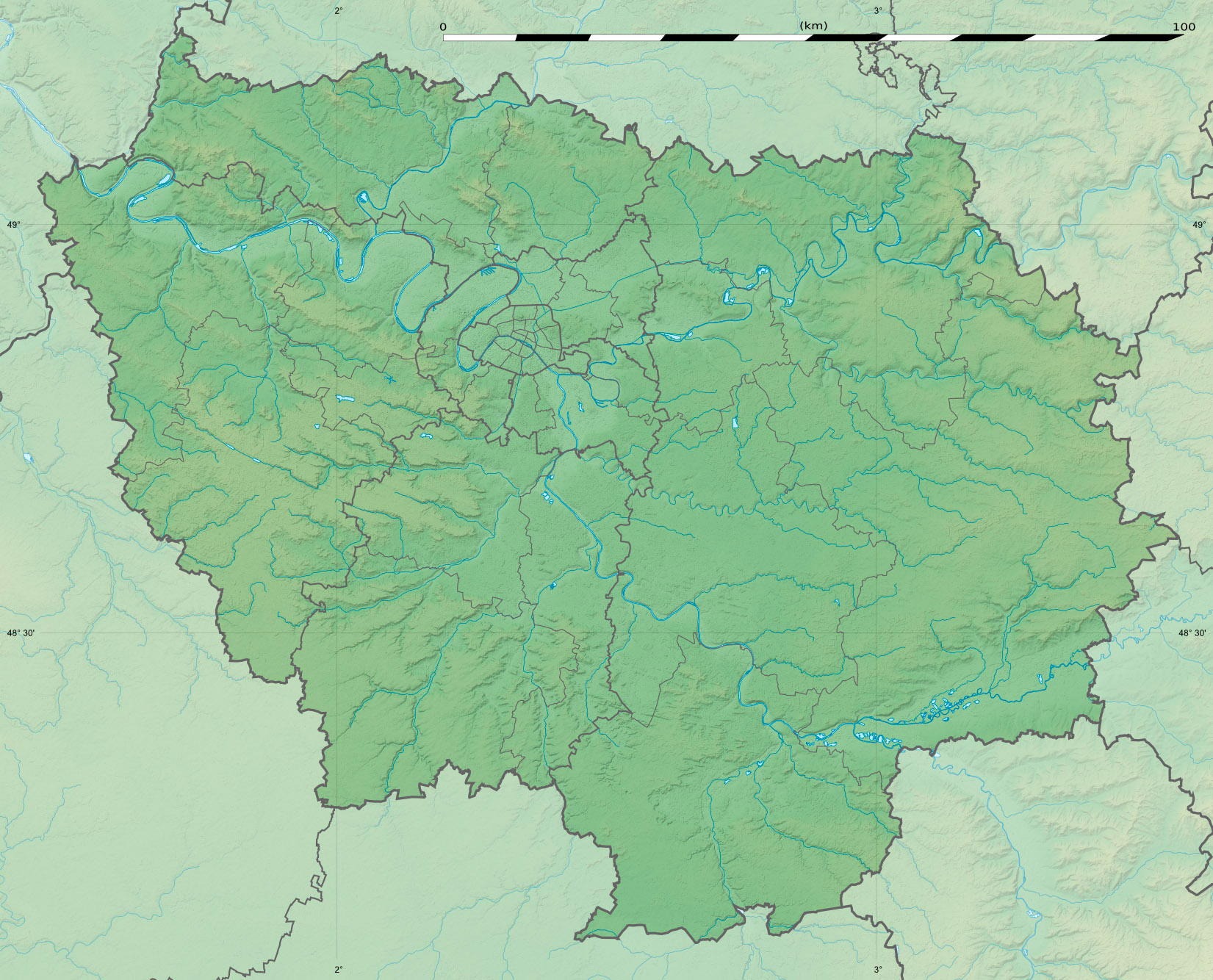
- Location within France Location within Île-de-France (region)
- Coordinates: 48°33′37″N 3°17′56″E
- Country: France
- Region: Île-de-France
- Department: Seine-et-Marne
- Arrondissement: Provins
- Canton: Provins
- Intercommunality: Provinois

Government
  - Mayor (2020–2026): Olivier Lavenka
- Area^{1}: 14.72 km^{2} (5.68 sq mi)
- Elevation: 91 m (299 ft)
- Highest elevation: 168 m (551 ft)
- Lowest elevation: 86 m (282 ft)
- Population (2023): 11,632
  - Density: 790.2/km^{2} (2,047/sq mi)
- Time zone: UTC+01:00 (CET)
  - Summer (DST): UTC+02:00 (CEST)
- INSEE/Postal code: 77379 /77160
- Website: www.mairie-provins.fr; www.provins.net/en/

UNESCO World Heritage Site
- Official name: Provins, Town of Medieval Fairs
- Criteria: Cultural: (ii)(iv)
- Reference: 873rev
- Inscription: 2001 (25th Session)
- Area: 108 ha (0.42 sq mi)
- Buffer zone: 1,365 ha (5.27 sq mi)
- ^{1} French Land Register data, which excludes lakes, ponds, glaciers > 1 km^{2} (0.386 sq mi or 247 acres) and river estuaries.

Provins (French pronunciation: [pʁɔvɛ̃]) is a commune in the Seine-et-Marne department in the Île-de-France region in north-central France. Known for its well-preserved medieval architecture and importance throughout the Middle Ages as an economic center and a host of annual trading fairs, Provins became a UNESCO World Heritage Site in 2001.

== Administration ==
With 11,632 inhabitants (2023), Provins is not the largest town in the arrondissement of Provins, but it is the seat (sous-préfecture). Provins is also the seat of the canton of Provins.

== History ==
There are signs of human occupation in the area as early as the Paleolithic era.

=== Roman era ===
Provins was at the crossroads of two major regional corridors in Roman Gaul: one from Soissons to Troyes, and one towards Sens in the south.

=== Medieval era ===
As proof of its growing importance, by the 9th century, Provins was minting its own coin, the denier provinois, and Charlemagne had sent his missi dominici to the town. Under the protection of the Counts of Champagne, Provins hosted one of the largest Champagne fairs, an agricultural and trade fair crucial to the medieval economy. In the upper town the fair would be held twice a year, in May and November, whereas in the lower town there was a yearly market in September. During that time, Provins also became a banking center, with the denier widely accepted throughout Europe. The fairs continued from 1120 until 1320.

The Empress Galla Placidia is said to have presented Ancona, Italy with the relics of Judas Cyriacus. However, the saint's head was at Provins, where Henry I of Champagne, who had brought there from Jerusalem, built Saint-Quiriace Collegiate Church to display it. Construction work on the church in the 12th century was never completed due to financial difficulties during the reign of Philippe le Bel. A dome was added in the 17th century, and the old families of Provins who lived in the upper town were called "Children of the Dome." Since the addition of the dome, however, no further restoration efforts have been made towards the church.

The Church of Saint-Ayoul [fr] was built to house relics discovered in 996 that were attributed to the saint. Initially, a crypt was built in the Saint-Médard chapel to secure the relics. By the mid-11th century, the chapel was unable to accommodate the crowds of pilgrims who came to pray there, and so Count Thibaut I of Champagne replaced it with a parish church and a priory of Benedictine monks. Due to long-term conflict between the parish and the priory, in 1527 the building was divided in two with a wall; the nave and aisles were given to the parish, while the priory retained the apse.

King Philip IV visited Provins several times in the late 13th century, devastating it with harsh taxes that ended its period of prosperity and caused residents to flee. The town was besieged numerous times and changed hands frequently in the 14th through 16th centuries. This political and economic instability reduced the importance of Provins.

In one of the most famous events in Provins’ history, the recently crowned King Charles VII attended Mass at Saint-Quiriace along with his royal court and Saint Joan of Arc on August 3, 1429.

=== Modern era ===
Being largely unaffected by the Industrial Revolution, Provins remained a small market town through the 19th century. The Germans occupied the town in 1870 during the Franco-Prussian War and were only barely fought off in 1914 during the First World War.

== Population ==
Historical population
Year	Pop.	±% p.a.
1968	11,432	—
1975	12,341	+1.10%
1982	12,065	−0.32%
1990	11,608	−0.48%
1999	11,667	+0.06%
2007	12,267	+0.63%
2012	12,161	−0.17%
2017	11,844	−0.53%
2023	11,632	−0.30%
Source: INSEE

== Sights ==
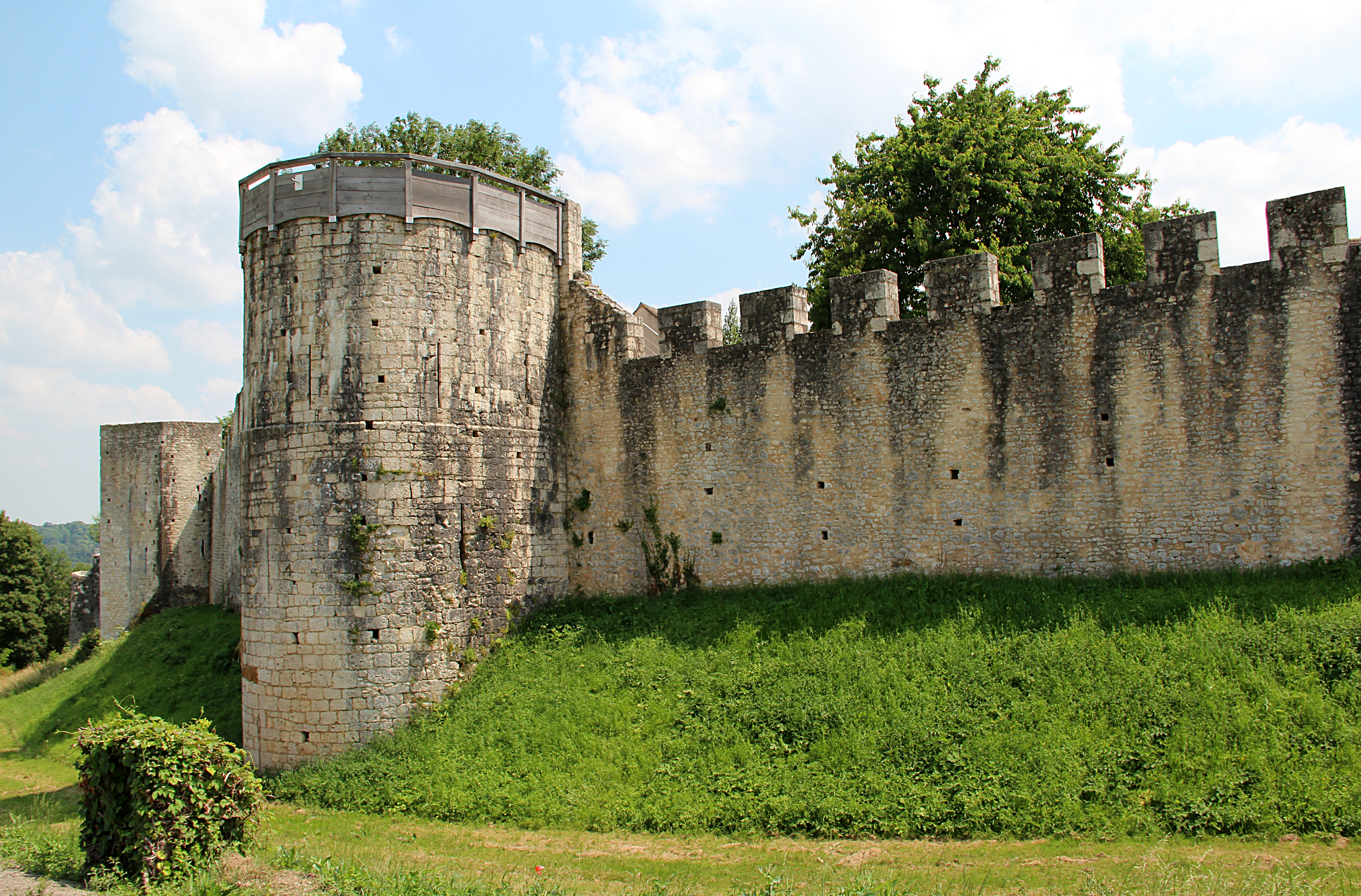
City walls and towers

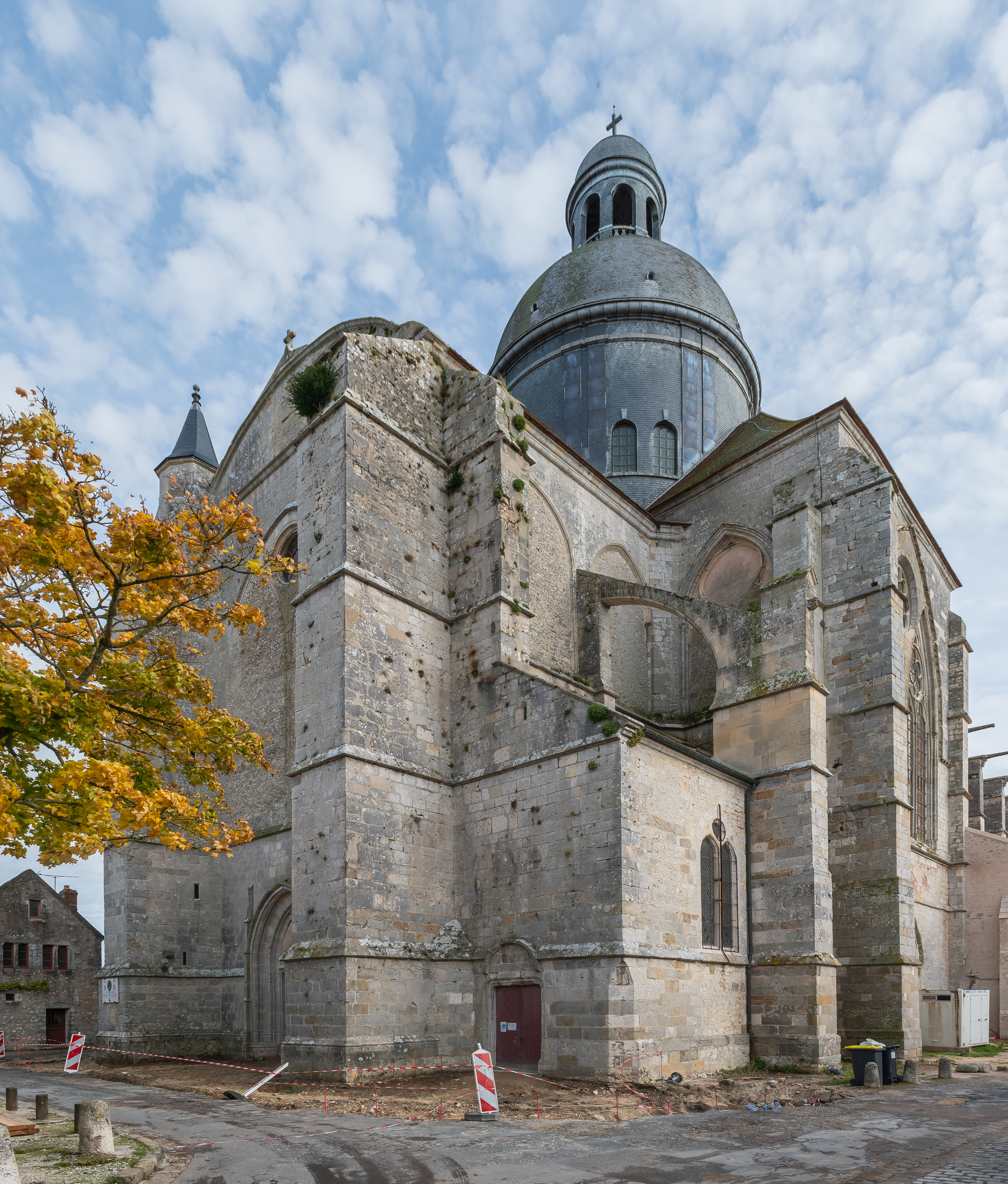
The Saint Quiriace Collegiate Church

Provins is known for its well-preserved original fortifications from the 12th century, such as the Tour César (the Caesar Tower) and city walls. Many residential and commercial buildings in the upper town are likewise from the 12th century; these buildings hosted merchants' residences, stores, and counting houses. Of the four main fair towns in the County of Champagne (Troyes, Lagny-sur-Marne, and Bar-sur-Aube), Provins is the only one that has retained much of its medieval character.

The head of Judas Cyriacus remains at Saint-Quiriace Collegiate Church. This church had also preserved the Islamic lampas chasuble that St Edmund had with him at the time of his death, but this garment has since been relocated to the Musée de Provins (Museum of Provins). Located in the Romanesque House [fr], which dates to Roman times but has a 12th-century façade, the museum also displays golden monstrances and a 15th-century Trinity icon from Saint-Quiriace, as well as other historical Provinois artifacts and exhibits.

Renovations and archaeological excavations at Saint-Ayoul Church have uncovered frescoes and painted plasterwork. The church also features sculptures on its portal carved by Georges Jeanclos from 1985 to 1988; stained-glass windows created by the visual artist Udo Zembok; and a medieval garden in which monks grew yews, sedum, and service-trees.

The police station (2010) is a piece of contemporary architecture designed by Parisian architects Philippe Ameller and Jacques Dubois.

Two sets of caves underlie parts of the town. The first set was probably used to store food and extract fuller's earth in the Middle Ages. The second, deeper set contains Bronze Age and Iron Age graffiti.

== Economy ==
Provins is an important center of rose cultivation, specifically the Provins rose (Rosa gallica). The Provinois produce various foodstuffs from roses; their main specialties are rose petal jam, Provinois rose honey, and rose candy. Provins also used to be a large producer of wine; many Provinois still make wine using medieval methods, and some vineyards remain in use.

== Education ==
- Public preschools (maternelles): Coudoux, Raymond Louis, Terrier Rouge, Ville Haute and Voulzie.
- Public primary schools: Coudoux, Désiré Laurent, Marais, Terrier Rouge, Ville Haute and Voulzie.
- Public junior high schools (collèges): Jules Verne, Lelorgne de Savigny, and Marie Curie.
- Public senior high schools (lycées): Thibaut de Champagne and Les Pannevelles.
- There is a private preschool through high school, Institution Sainte-Croix.

== Notable people ==
Provins is the birthplace of:

- Marie Jules César Savigny (1777–1851), zoologist
- Edmond Nocard (1850-1903), veterinarian and microbiologist
- Maurice Hayot (1862–1945), violinist
- Jean-Pierre Vernant (1914–2007), historian
- Dominique A (born 1968), songwriter and singer
- David Moncoutié (born 1975), retired road racing cyclist

Provins is the hometown of:

- Christian Jacob (born 1959), farmer and politician

== Twin towns ==
Provins is twinned with:

- Bendorf, Germany
- Pingyao, China

== See also ==
- Communes of the Seine-et-Marne department
