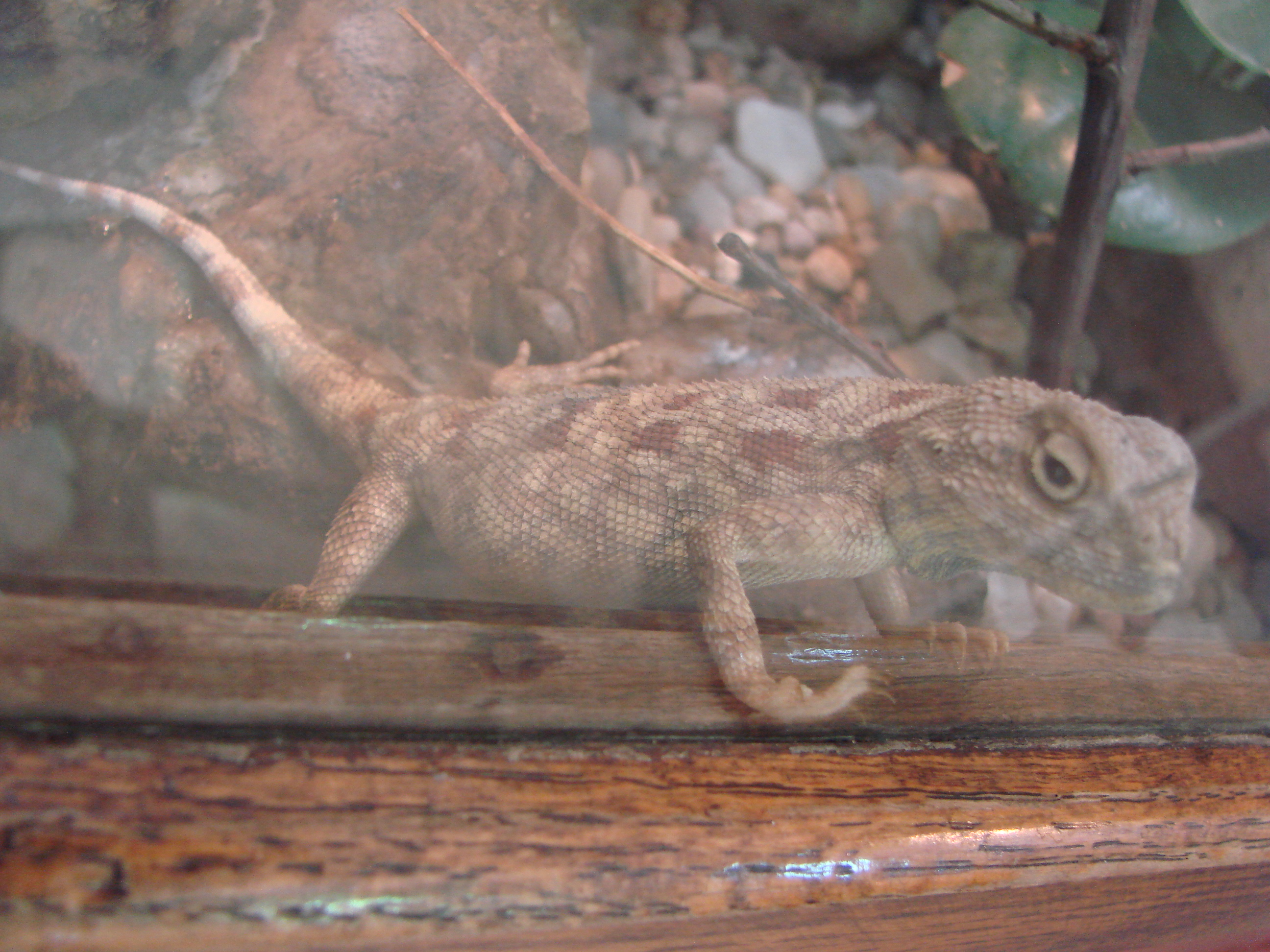

Conservation status
- Vulnerable (IUCN 3.1)

Scientific classification
- Kingdom: Animalia
- Phylum: Chordata
- Class: Reptilia
- Order: Squamata
- Suborder: Iguania
- Family: Agamidae
- Genus: Trapelus
- Species: T. savignii

Binomial name
- Trapelus savignii (A.M.C. Duméril & Bibron, 1837)
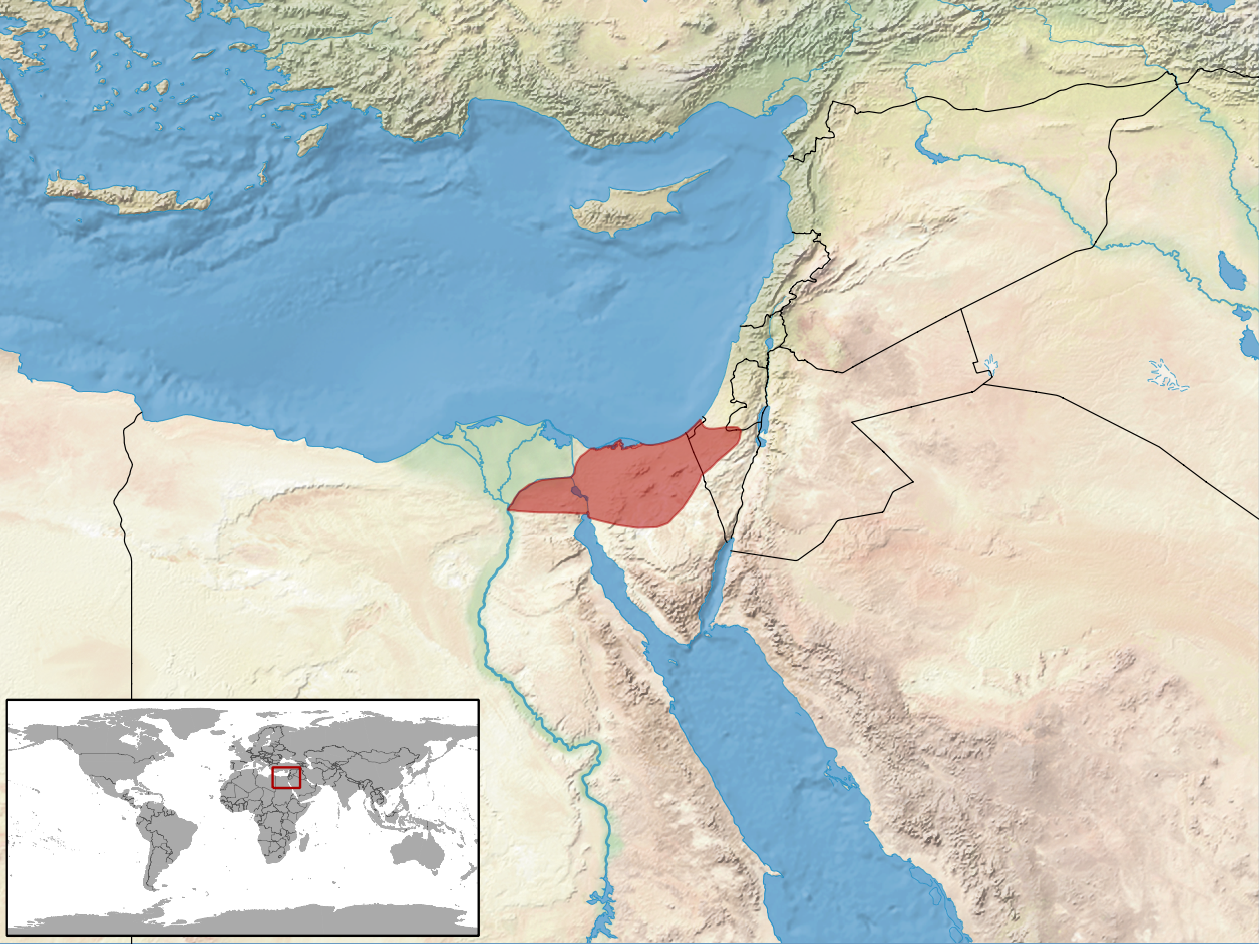

Synonyms.
- Agama savignii Duméril & Bibron 1837; Phrynopsis savignyi (Duméril & Bibron 1837); Trapelus savignyi (Duméril & Bibron 1837); Agama savignyi Duméril & Bibron 1837; Agama agilis Audouin, 1829

= Savigny's agama =

Species of lizard

Savigny's agama (Trapelus savignii) is a species of lizard belonging to the family Agamidae, the agamas. This lizard is found in southwestern Asia.

== Taxonomy ==
Savigny's agama was first formally described as Agama savignii in 1837 by the French zoologists André Marie Constant Duméril and Gabriel Bibron with its type locality given as Egypt. This was later restricted to El Arish in the northern Sinai Peninsula of Egypt when a neotype was designated in 2009 by Philipp Wagner and Pierre-André Crochet. This lizard belongs to the Agamidae, a family of lizards found in southern Eurasia and Africa.

== Etymology ==
Savigny's agama has the specific name, savignii, and the common name, Savigny's agama, both of which honuor the French zoologist Marie Jules César Savigny.

== Description ==
Savigny's agama has a maxium snout to vent of 12.3 cm (4.8 in). Typically these lizards are a uniform sandy grey colour marked with five brown transverse bands, these are broken up by a yellowish stripe and whitish lines on the body, and a barred tail. There are also two transverse bands between the eyes. Breeding Adult males develop a characteristic coloration, with bright to violet blue coloration developing on the throat and flanks, the flanks being marked with white spots. Gravid females have brick red dorsal bands.

== Distribution and habitat ==
Savigny's agama is almost endemic to Egypt, it is found from the northern part of the Eastern Desert across most of northern Sinai, to the western Negev Desert in Israel and the Gaza Strip. This species is found in sand and gravel deserts, including habitats on the margins of desret areas such as small, stabilised valleys between dunes. It prefers to be within vegetation cover, including grasslands, vegetated sand dunes and alluvial soils in large wadis.

== Biology ==
Savigny's agama is known to be oviparous.

== Conservation status ==
Savigny's agama has been assessed by the International Union for Conservation of Nature as Near Threatened because this species is thought to have become effectively extinct in a substantial minority of its range over the 20 years leading up to the assessment.
