= Trapelus boehmei =

Conservation status
- Least Concern (IUCN 3.1)

Scientific classification
- Kingdom: Animalia
- Phylum: Chordata
- Class: Reptilia
- Order: Squamata
- Suborder: Iguania
- Family: Agamidae
- Genus: Trapelus
- Species: T. boehmei

Binomial name
- Trapelus boehmei Wagner, Melville, Wilms, & Schmitz, 2011

Species of lizard

Trapelus boehmei is a species of agama. It is found in at least Mauritania, Morocco, Algeria, and Niger, possibly also in Western Sahara, Mali, and Tunisia. It is named after Wolfgang Böhme, German herpetologist.
