= Trapelus rubrigularis =

Scientific classification
- Domain: Eukaryota
- Kingdom: Animalia
- Phylum: Chordata
- Class: Reptilia
- Order: Squamata
- Suborder: Iguania
- Family: Agamidae
- Genus: Trapelus
- Species: T. rubrigularis

Binomial name
- Trapelus rubrigularis Blanford, 1875

Species of lizard

Trapelus rubrigularis, the red-throated agama, is a species of agama found in Pakistan.
