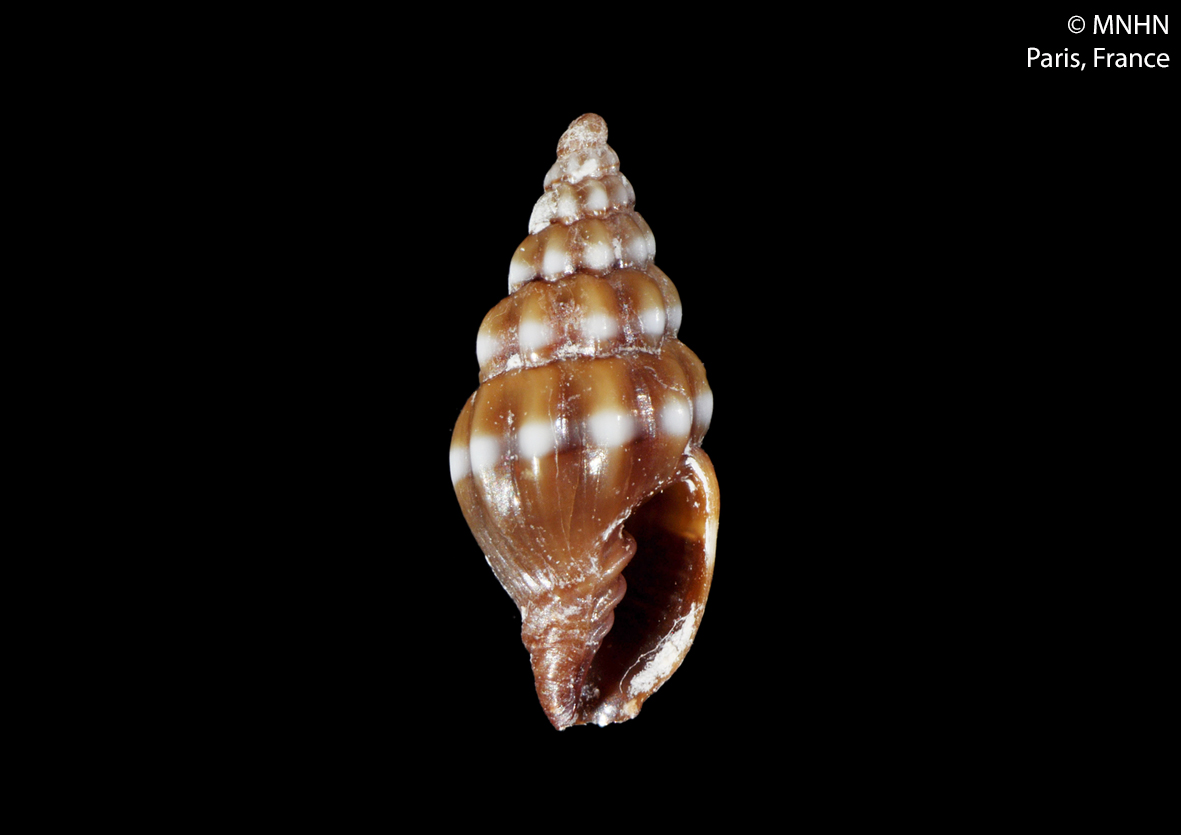
- Shell of Ebenomitra savignyi (specimen at MNHN, Paris)

Scientific classification
- Kingdom: Animalia
- Phylum: Mollusca
- Class: Gastropoda
- Subclass: Caenogastropoda
- Order: Neogastropoda
- Superfamily: Turbinelloidea
- Family: Costellariidae
- Genus: Ebenomitra
- Species: E. savignyi

Binomial name
- Ebenomitra savignyi (Payraudeau, 1826)

Synonyms
- Mitra (Pusia) savignyi Payraudeau, 1826 · unaccepted > superseded combination; Mitra savignyi Payraudeau, 1826 (original combination); Pusia (Ebenomitra) savignyi (Payraudeau, 1826); Pusia savignyi (Payraudeau, 1826) superseded combination; Turricula (Uromitra) savignyi (Payraudeau, 1826); Uromitra savignyi (Payraudeau, 1826) superseded combination; Vexillum savignyi (Payraudeau, 1826)

= Ebenomitra savignyi =

Species of gastropod

Ebenomitra savignyi is a species of ribbed miters, a genus of marine sea snails.

== Description ==
(Original description in Latin) The shell is very small, smooth, and glossy, of a tawny or horn-like color. It is marked by thick, nodose longitudinal ribs. It has five or six whorls, which are banded with white. The columella bears three folds, and the shell measures approximately four lines in length (roughly about 8–9 mm long).

== Distribution ==
This marine species occurs off Sicily, Italy and off the coast of Algeria.
