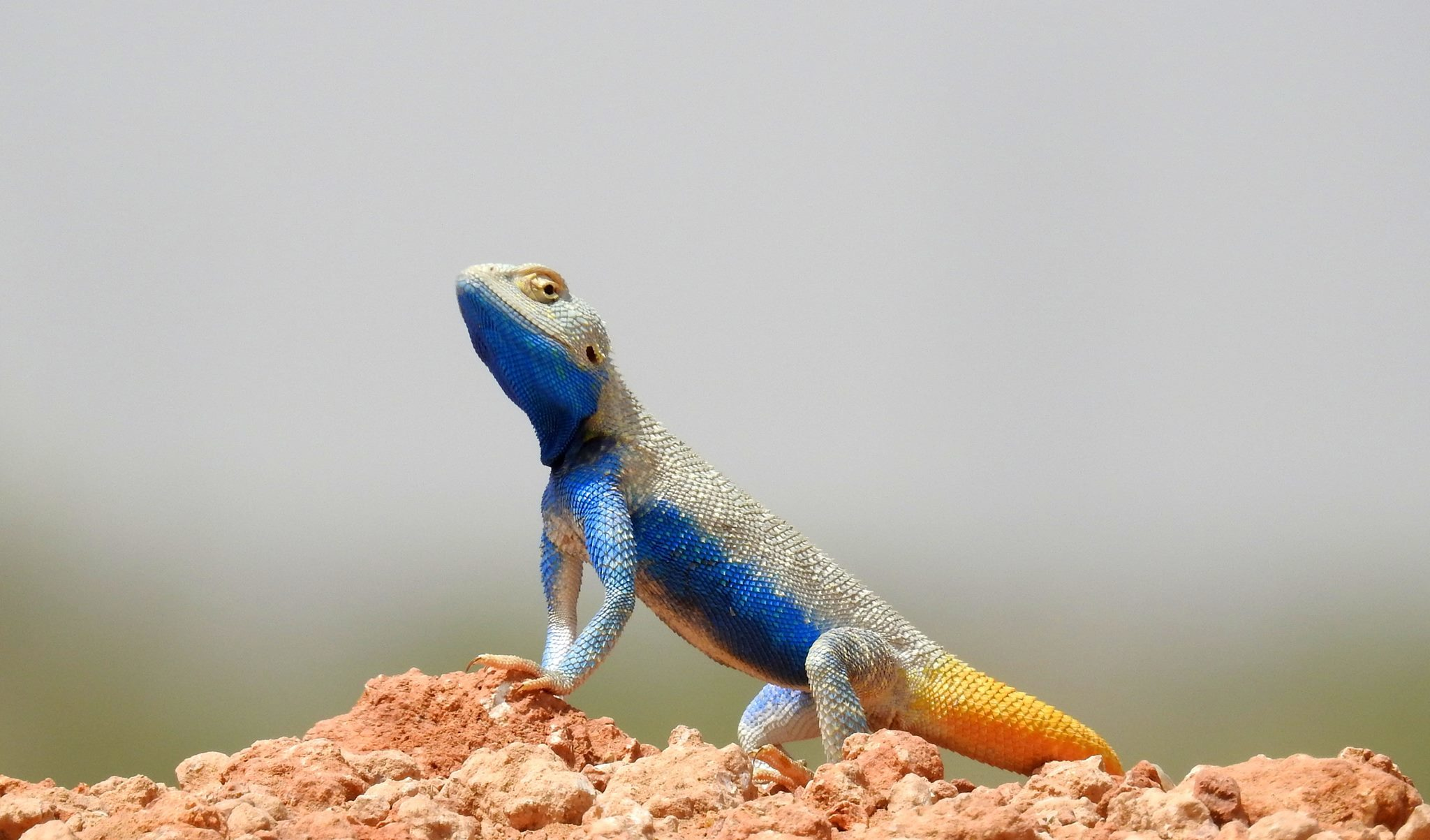

Scientific classification
- Kingdom: Animalia
- Phylum: Chordata
- Class: Reptilia
- Order: Squamata
- Suborder: Iguania
- Family: Agamidae
- Genus: Trapelus
- Species: T. agilis

Binomial name
- Trapelus agilis (Olivier, 1807)

Synonyms
- Agama agilis

= Brilliant ground agama =

Species of lizard

The brilliant ground agama (Trapelus agilis) is a species of agama found in Central, West and South Asia, in Iran, Pakistan, India, Russia, Turkmenistan, Tajikistan, Uzbekistan, Kazakhstan, China, possibly Iraq, and Afghanistan (T. a. isolepis).

- Race khuzistanensis: Type locality: Iran, Khuzistan Province, 5 km northwest of Haft-Gel on the road to Shushtar.
- Race pakistanensis - southeastern Pakistan and adjacent northwestern India: Type locality: Gaj-River, Kirthar Range, southeastern Pakistan.
