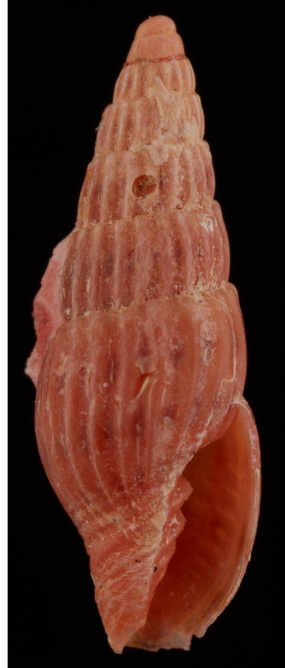
- Shell of Ebenomitra strictecostata (specimen at MNHN, Paris)

Scientific classification
- Kingdom: Animalia
- Phylum: Mollusca
- Class: Gastropoda
- Subclass: Caenogastropoda
- Order: Neogastropoda
- Family: Costellariidae
- Genus: Ebenomitra
- Species: E. strictecostata

Binomial name
- Ebenomitra strictecostata (von Maltzan, 1884)

Synonyms
- Mitra (Costellaria) strictecostata Maltzan, 1884 (basionym); Mitra glabrilirata G. B. Sowerby III, 1914 junior subjective synonym; Pusia strictecostatum (Maltzan, 1884); Vexillum (Pusia) strictecostatum (Maltzan, 1884); Vexillum strictecostatum (Maltzan, 1884) superseded combination

= Ebenomitra strictecostata =

Species of gastropod

Ebenomitra strictecostata is a species of small sea snail, marine gastropod mollusk in the family Costellariidae, the ribbed miters.

== Description ==
The length of the shell attains 11 mm, its diameter 4 mm.

(Described in Latin as Mitra glabrilirata) The shell is small, elongate-fusiform, narrow, and glossy brown. It consists of seven whorls; the protoconch ones are smooth and rounded, while the subsequent ones are somewhat straight and longitudinally ribbed. These numerous ribs are smooth, and the suture is distinctly impressed. The body whorl, where the ribs partially fade away, makes up half of the shell's total length. Furthermore, the aperture is rather short, and the outer lip is thin. The columella is brown and features four folds, with the anterior folds being very small and the posterior ones prominent.

== Distribution ==
This marine species occurs off Senegal.
