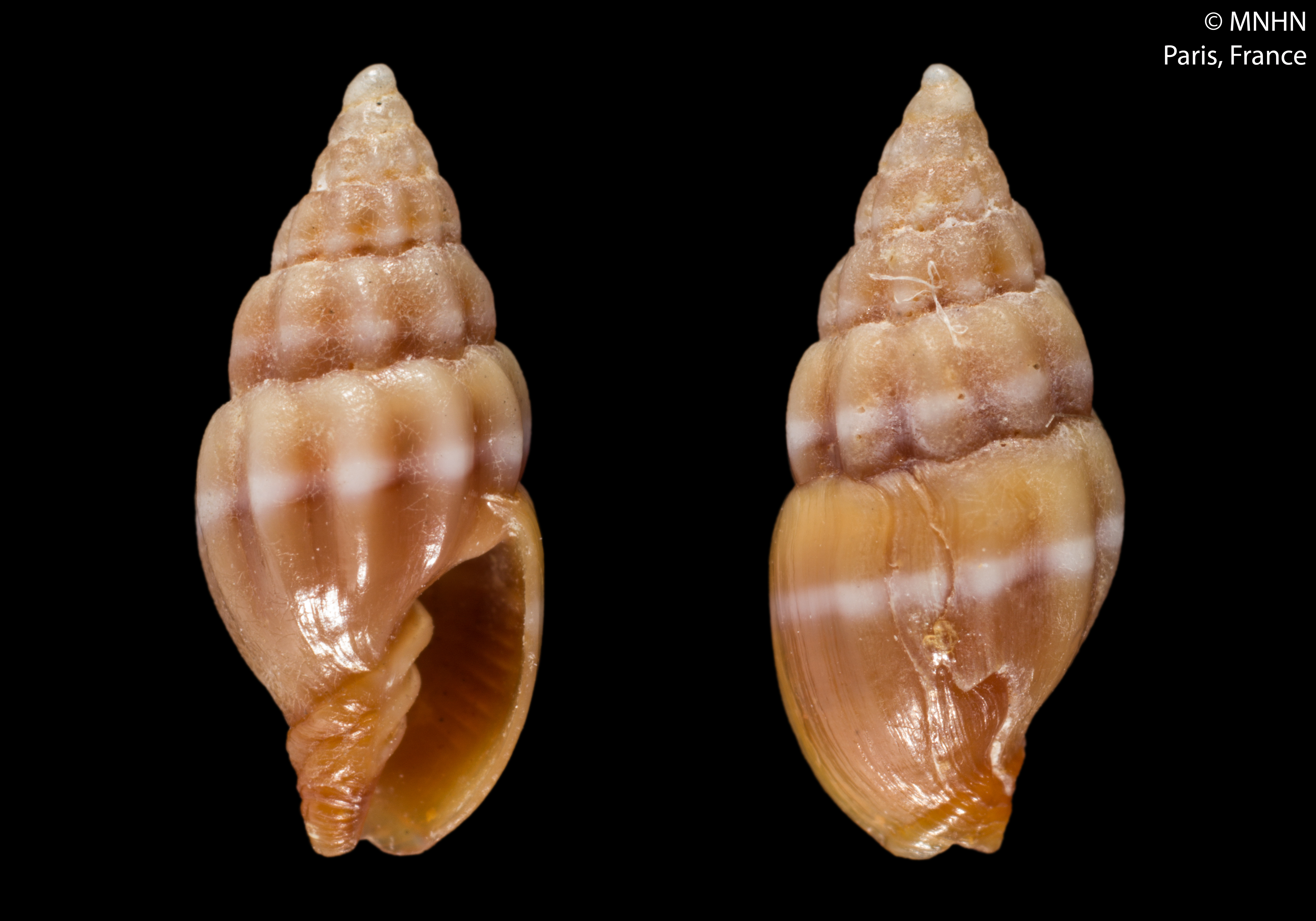
- Shell of Ebenomitra tricolor (syntype at MNHN, Paris)

Scientific classification
- Kingdom: Animalia
- Phylum: Mollusca
- Class: Gastropoda
- Subclass: Caenogastropoda
- Order: Neogastropoda
- Superfamily: Turbinelloidea
- Family: Costellariidae
- Genus: Ebenomitra
- Species: E. tricolor

Binomial name
- Ebenomitra tricolor (Gmelin, 1791)

Synonyms
- Mitra (Pusia) tricolor (Gmelin, 1791) superseded combination; Mitra exilis Locard, 1890 ( junior homonym (invalid; not Reeve, 1845 and others)); Mitra gracilis Costa O.G., 1844; Mitra punctulata Risso, 1826; Mitra pusilla Bivona Ant., 1832; Pusia (Ebenomitra) tricolor (Gmelin, 1791); Pusia tricolor (Gmelin, 1791) · unaccepted > superseded combination; Turricula (Uromitra) tricolor (Gmelin, 1791) · unaccepted; Uromitra tricolor (Gmelin, 1791) superseded combination; Vexillum tricolor (Gmelin, 1791); Voluta tricolor Gmelin, 1791

= Ebenomitra tricolor =

Species of gastropod

Ebenomitra tricolor is a species of sea snail, a marine gastropod mollusk, in the family Costellariidae, the ribbed miters.

== Description ==
The length of the shell attains 8 mm.

(Described in French as Mitra exilis) The shell has a rather elongated fusiform shape, more developed above than below. Its longitudinal folds are fairly pronounced, though somewhat short. The spire is high and pointed, with seven to eight fairly convex whorls, and the suture is quite deep. The body whorl is large, slightly swollen in the middle, and well tapered toward the base. The columella bears three folds, and the coloration is the same. The shell measures 8 to 9 mm in height and about 2¾ mm in diameter.

== Distribution ==
This species occurs in the Mediterranean Sea off France.
