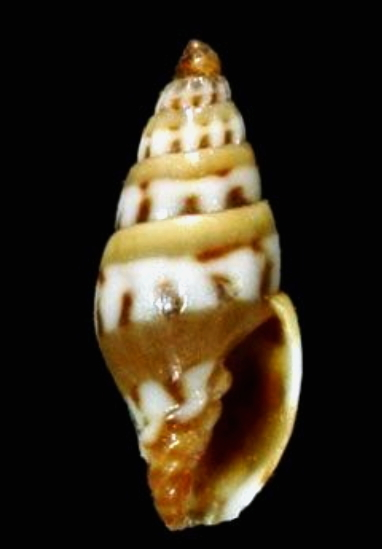
- Shell of Ebenomitra granum (specimen at the Natural History Museum Rotterdam)

Scientific classification
- Kingdom: Animalia
- Phylum: Mollusca
- Class: Gastropoda
- Subclass: Caenogastropoda
- Order: Neogastropoda
- Superfamily: Turbinelloidea
- Family: Costellariidae
- Genus: Ebenomitra
- Species: E. granum

Binomial name
- Ebenomitra granum (Forbes, 1844)

Synonyms
- Mitra carnea Costa, 1844; Mitra granum Forbes, 1844; Mitra littoralis Forbes, 1844; Mitra picta Danilo & Sandri, 1856 (junior homonym; non Mitra picta Reeve, 1844; Mitra sandrii Brusina, 1866 is a replacement name; Mitra sandrii Brusina, 1865; Pusia (Ebenomitra) granum (Forbes, 1844); Pusia granum (Forbes, 1844) superseded combination; Vexillum granum (Forbes, 1844); Vexillum littorale (Forbes, 1844)

= Ebenomitra granum =

Species of gastropod

Ebenomitra granum is a species of sea snail, a marine gastropod mollusk, in the family Costellariidae, the ribbed miters.

== Description ==
The length of the shell attains 6.6 mm.

(Original description in Latin) The shell is linear, smooth, and black, featuring a white band that is interrupted by black spots. It consists of seven whorls and has a ribbed apex. Furthermore, the inner lip has three very strong folds.

== Distribution ==
This species occurs mostly in the Aegean Sea and the Sea of Marmara. It is also found off the coasts of Greece (such as Crete), Turkey (southern coast), and Italy (including Sicily, Sardinia, and the Gulf of Taranto).
