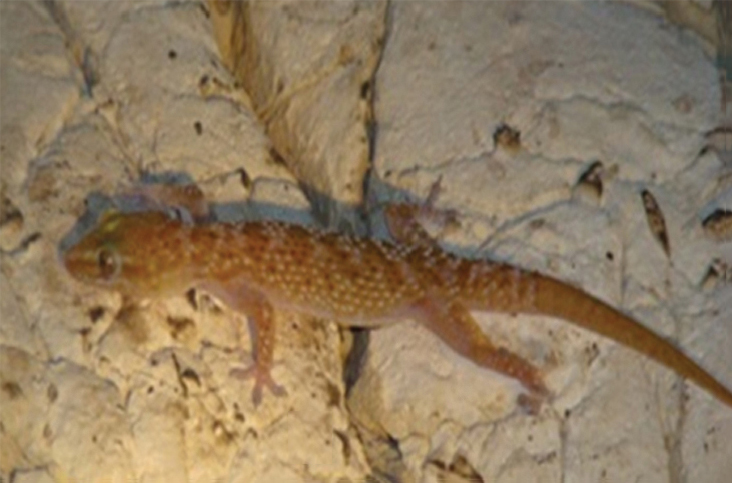

Conservation status
- Least Concern (IUCN 3.1)

Scientific classification
- Kingdom: Animalia
- Phylum: Chordata
- Class: Reptilia
- Order: Squamata
- Suborder: Gekkota
- Family: Gekkonidae
- Genus: Hemidactylus
- Species: H. persicus

Binomial name
- Hemidactylus persicus Anderson, 1872

= Hemidactylus persicus =

Persian leaf-toed gecko

Species of lizard

Hemidactylus persicus, also known as the Persian leaf-toed gecko or Persian gecko, is a species of gecko found in West Asia.

== Description ==
It has a snout rather acuminate, as long as the distance between the eye and the upper border of the ear-opening, 1.3 the diameter of the orbit; forehead concave; interorbital space very narrow; upper eyelid strongly fringed; ear-opening large, obliquely crescentic, the concavity being directed forwards and upwards, its diameter equalling three fourths that of the eye. Body and limbs moderate. Digits free, moderately dilated, inner well developed; infradigital lamellae obliquely curved; 10 lamellae under the thumb, 10 under the third finger, 9 under the inner toe, and 12 under the third toe. Snout covered with large convex granular scales, largest between the eye and the nostril; hinder part of head with minute granules, and scattered ones of a larger size. Rostral four times as broad as deep (having fused with the anterior labial on each side); nostril above the rostral, between the latter and three nasals; 10 or 11 upper and 9 lower labials; mental large, triangular, twice as long as the adjacent labial, its point between two large chin-shields which are in contact behind it; a small chin-shield on each side of the large pair. Upper surface of body covered -with small irregular flat grannies and moderately large, trihedral, strongly keeled tubercles arranged in 14 or 16 rather irregular longitudinal series; the largest tubercles measure about one fourth the diameter of the eye. Abdominal scales small, smooth, rounded, imbricate. Male with a shore angular series of 8 preanal pores. Tail cylindrical, tapering, covered above with small, irregular, imbricate smooth scales and scattered pointed tubercles forming four or six longitudinal series, beneath with a series of transversely dilated plates. Pale yellowish brown, with six faint brownish transverse narrow dorsal bands, the tubercles in these areas being almost black; a dark brown streak from the nostrils through the eye above the ear, with a whitish line above it; lips whitish.

== Distribution ==
S Iran (Shiraz), Iraq, Saudi Arabia, N Oman, Bahrain Pakistan (Sind, Waziristan), N India

Type locality: restricted to Shiraz, Persia (by Smith 1935)
