= Trapelus persicus =

Scientific classification
- Domain: Eukaryota
- Kingdom: Animalia
- Phylum: Chordata
- Class: Reptilia
- Order: Squamata
- Suborder: Iguania
- Family: Agamidae
- Genus: Trapelus
- Species: T. persicus

Binomial name
- Trapelus persicus (Blanford, 1881)

Species of lizard

Trapelus persicus, Olivier's agama or Baluch ground agama, is a species of agama found in Syria, Lebanon, Jordan, Saudi Arabia, Iraq, and Iran.
