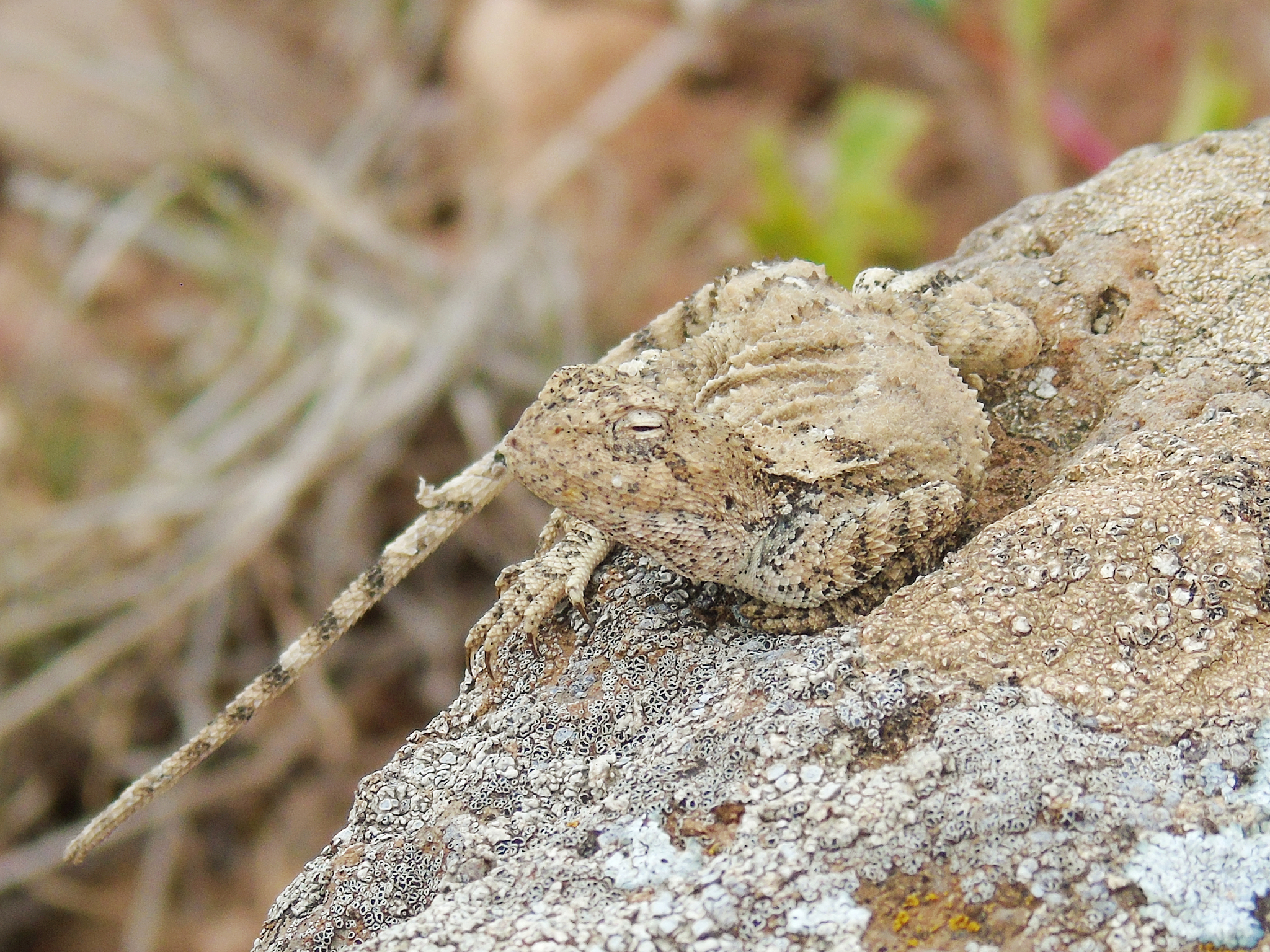

Conservation status
- Least Concern (IUCN 3.1)

Scientific classification
- Kingdom: Animalia
- Phylum: Chordata
- Class: Reptilia
- Order: Squamata
- Suborder: Iguania
- Family: Agamidae
- Genus: Trapelus
- Species: T. ruderatus

Binomial name
- Trapelus ruderatus (Olivier, 1804)

= Trapelus ruderatus =

Species of lizard

Trapelus ruderatus, Olivier's agama or Baluch ground agama, is a species of agama found in Azerbaijan, Syria, Lebanon, Jordan, Saudi Arabia, Iraq, Iran, and Pakistan.
