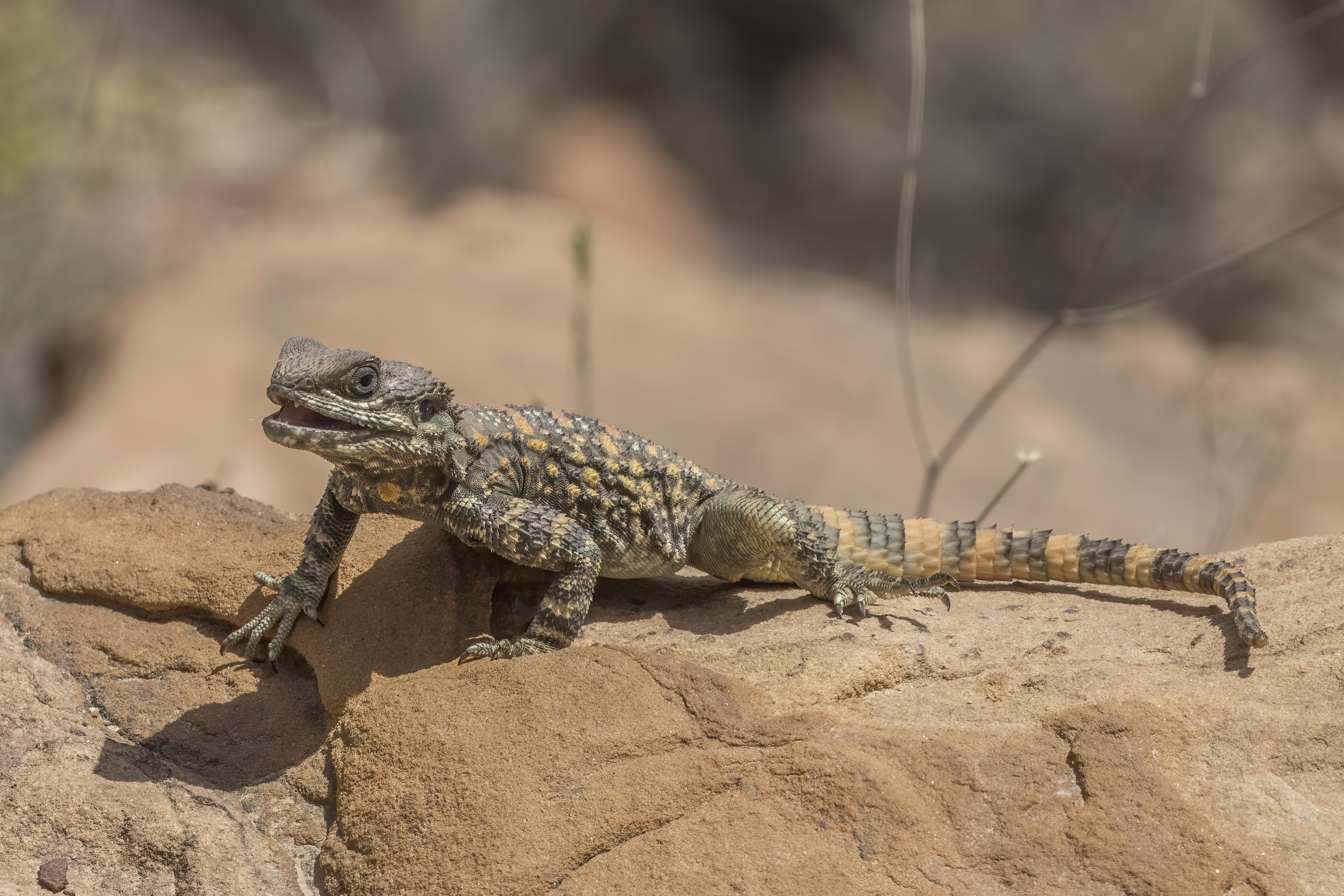
- Roughtail rock agama (Laudakia vulgaris brachydactyla) in Jordan

Scientific classification
- Kingdom: Animalia
- Phylum: Chordata
- Class: Reptilia
- Order: Squamata
- Suborder: Iguania
- Family: Agamidae
- Subfamily: Agaminae; Gray, 1827

Genera
- many, see text

= Agaminae =

Subfamily of lizards

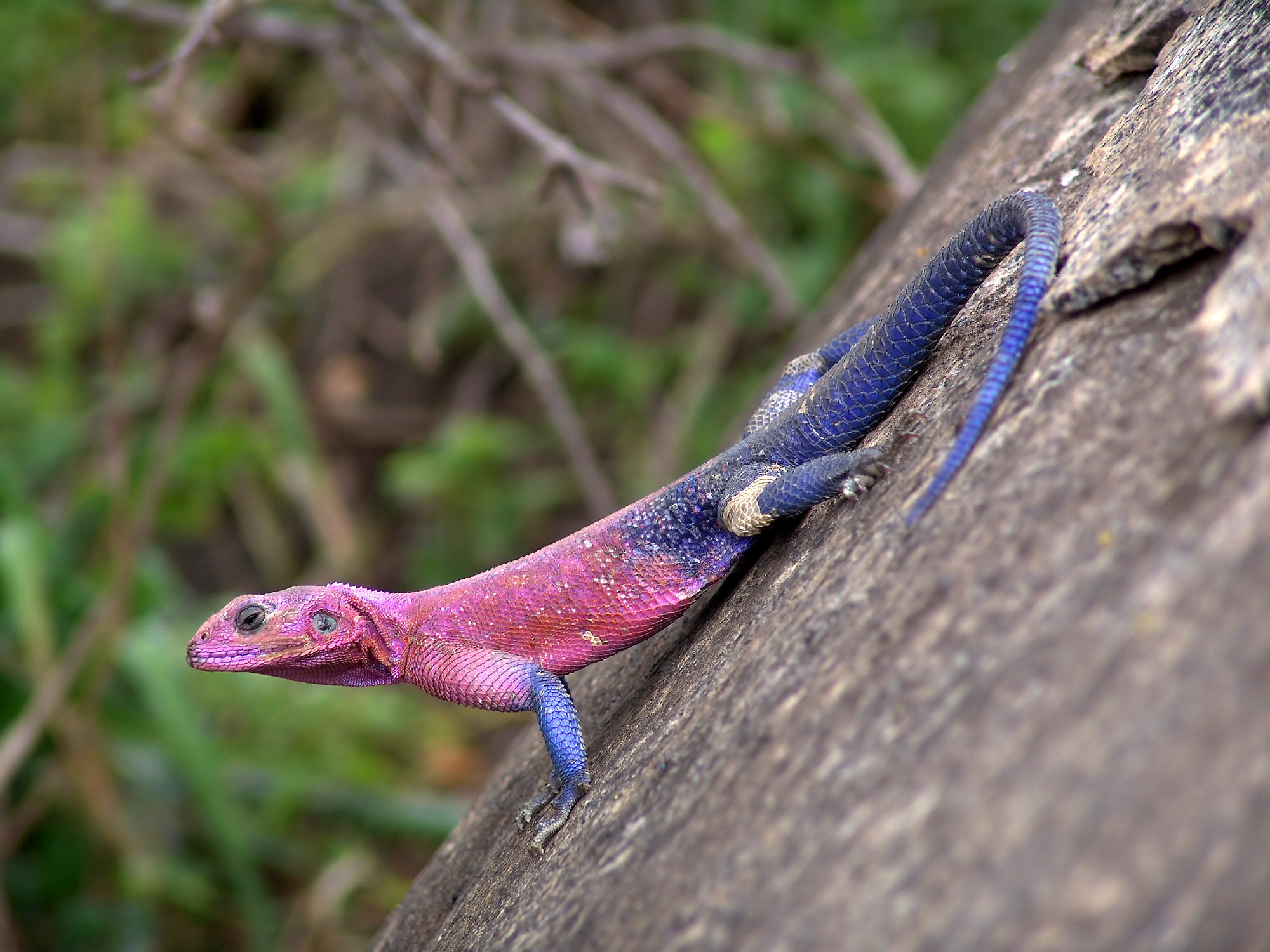
Mwanza flat-headed rock agama (Agama mwanzae)

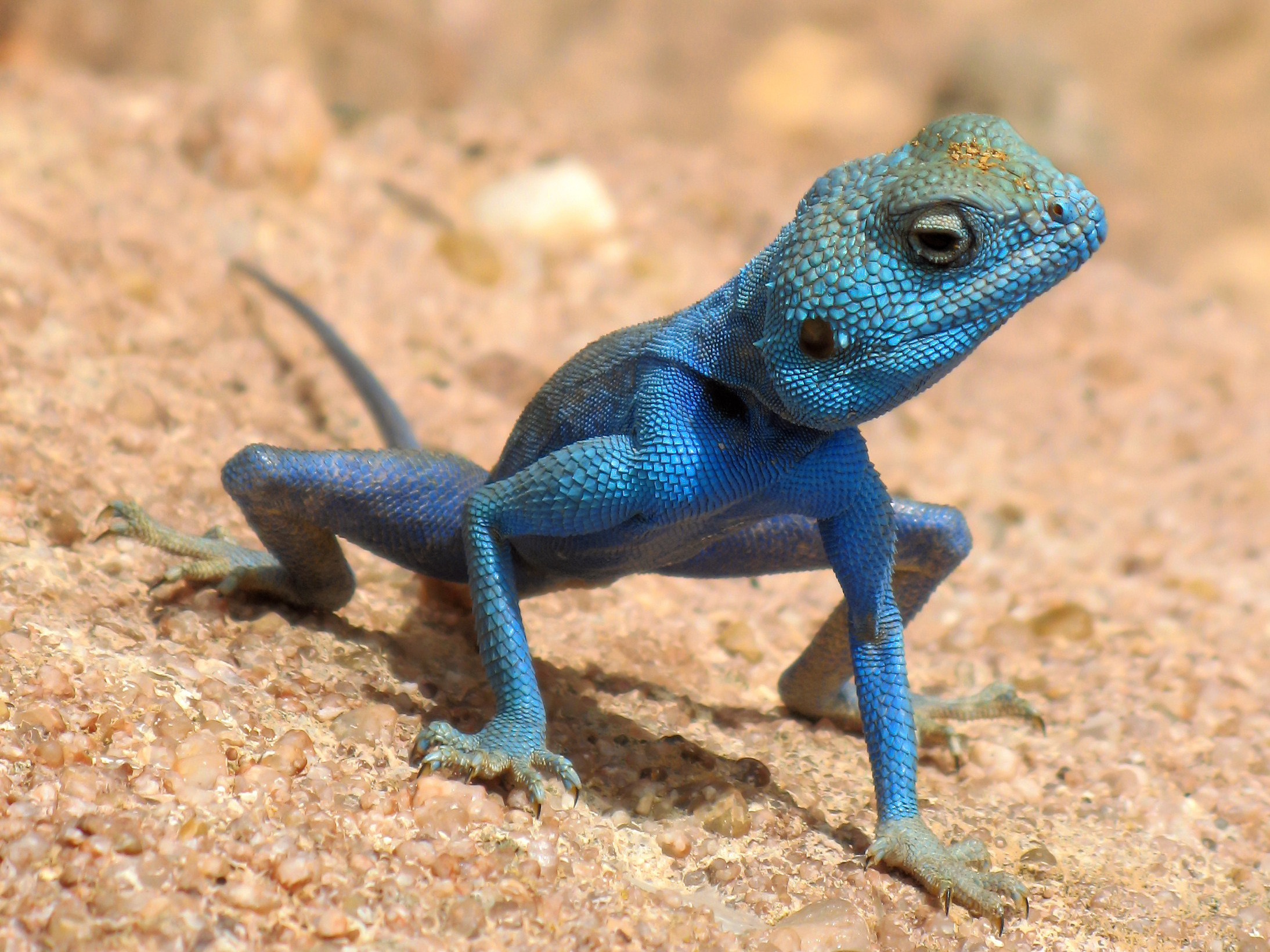
Sinai agama Pseudotrapelus sinaitus

The Agaminae are a subfamily of reptiles in the family Agamidae.

== Genera ==
Listed alphabetically:

- Acanthocercus
- Agama
- Bufoniceps (Laungwala long-headed lizard)
- Coryphophylax
- Laudakia (Asian rock agamas)
- Paralaudakia - sometimes included in Laudakia (Asian rock agamas)
- Phrynocephalus (toadhead agamas)
- Pseudotrapelus
- Trapelus
- Xenagama
