= Hemidactylus eniangii =

Conservation status
- Least Concern (IUCN 3.1)

Scientific classification
- Kingdom: Animalia
- Phylum: Chordata
- Class: Reptilia
- Order: Squamata
- Suborder: Gekkota
- Family: Gekkonidae
- Genus: Hemidactylus
- Species: H. eniangii

Binomial name
- Hemidactylus eniangii Wagner, Leaché & Fujita, 2014

Species of lizard

Hemidactylus eniangii is a species of forest gecko found in Nigeria (i.e., east of the Dahomey Gap) and northern Cameroon. It inhabits lowland tropical moist forest at elevations of 10–960 m (33–3,150 ft) above sea level and can be locally very common.

Hemidactylus eniangii can grow to 60 mm (2.4 in) in snout–vent length and about 140 mm (5.5 in) in total length.
