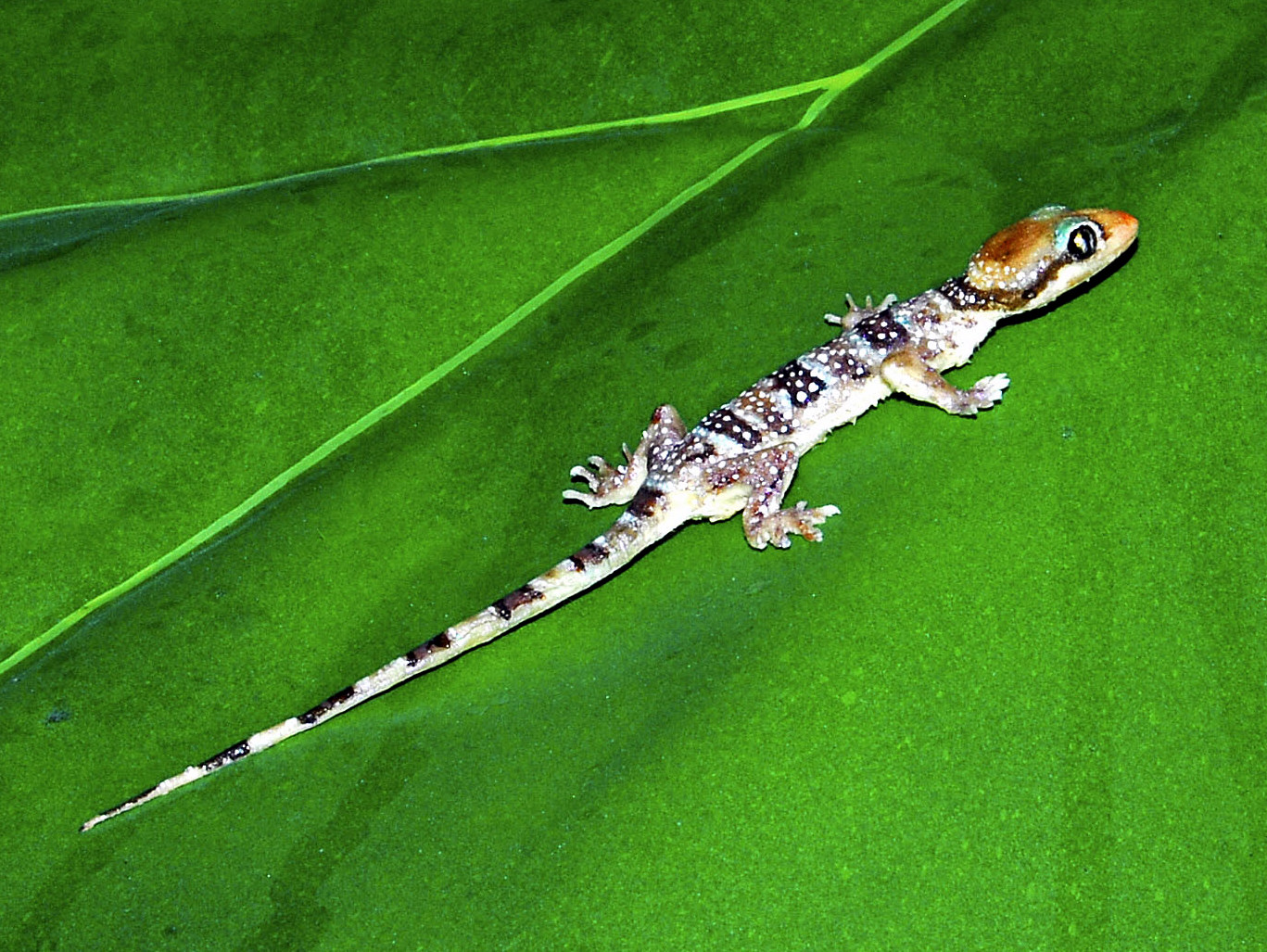

Conservation status
- Least Concern (IUCN 3.1)

Scientific classification
- Kingdom: Animalia
- Phylum: Chordata
- Class: Reptilia
- Order: Squamata
- Suborder: Gekkota
- Family: Gekkonidae
- Genus: Hemidactylus
- Species: H. coalescens

Binomial name
- Hemidactylus coalescens Wagner, Leaché & Fujita, 2014

Synonyms
- Hemidactylus coalescens Leaché & Fujita 2010 (nomen nudum)

= Hemidactylus coalescens =

Species of lizard

Hemidactylus coalescens is a species of geckos belonging to the family Gekkonidae. It occurs in Central Africa.

== Distribution and habitat ==
This species is locally common in rainforest regions of Central Africa, from southern Cameroon through Gabon to the Republic of the Congo.

== Description ==
Hemidactylus coalescens can reach a snout–vent length of 78 millimetres (3.1 in) and a total length of 174 millimetres (6.9 in). These medium-sized species has a more elongated head and three enlarged internasal scales. Body shows a few dark crossbands with white spots and pale brown interspaces with white spots. The first crossband is restricted to the neck. On the sides of the brown head there is a fine narrow dark stripe reaching the eyes.
