= Cyrtodactylus kulenensis =

Scientific classification
- Kingdom: Animalia
- Phylum: Chordata
- Class: Reptilia
- Order: Squamata
- Suborder: Gekkota
- Family: Gekkonidae
- Genus: Cyrtodactylus
- Species: C. kulenensis

Binomial name
- Cyrtodactylus kulenensis Grismer, Geissler, Neang, Hartmann, Wagner, & Poyarkov, 2021

Species of lizard

Cyrtodactylus kulenensis is a species of gecko that is endemic to Cambodia.
