= Agama lucyae =

Conservation status
- Data Deficient (IUCN 3.1)

Scientific classification
- Kingdom: Animalia
- Phylum: Chordata
- Class: Reptilia
- Order: Squamata
- Suborder: Iguania
- Family: Agamidae
- Genus: Agama
- Species: A. lucyae

Binomial name
- Agama lucyae Wagner & Bauer, 2011

Species of lizard

Agama lucyae is a species of lizard in the family Agamidae. It is a small lizard endemic to Ethiopia.
