= Xenagama zonura =

Conservation status
- Data Deficient (IUCN 3.1)

Scientific classification
- Kingdom: Animalia
- Phylum: Chordata
- Class: Reptilia
- Order: Squamata
- Suborder: Iguania
- Family: Agamidae
- Genus: Xenagama
- Species: X. zonura

Binomial name
- Xenagama zonura (Boulenger, 1895)

Species of lizard

The Ethiopian ridgeback agama (Xenagama zonura), is a species of lizard in the family Agamidae. The species is endemic to the Horn of Africa. It is among the largest species of Xenagama, with snout-to-vent length of males up to 84.5mm.

== Geographic range ==
X. zonura is endemic to Ethiopia, in elevations between 2000 and 2500m. Comparatively to other Xenagama species, X. zonura resides at higher elevations.

== Reproduction ==
X. zonura is oviparous.
