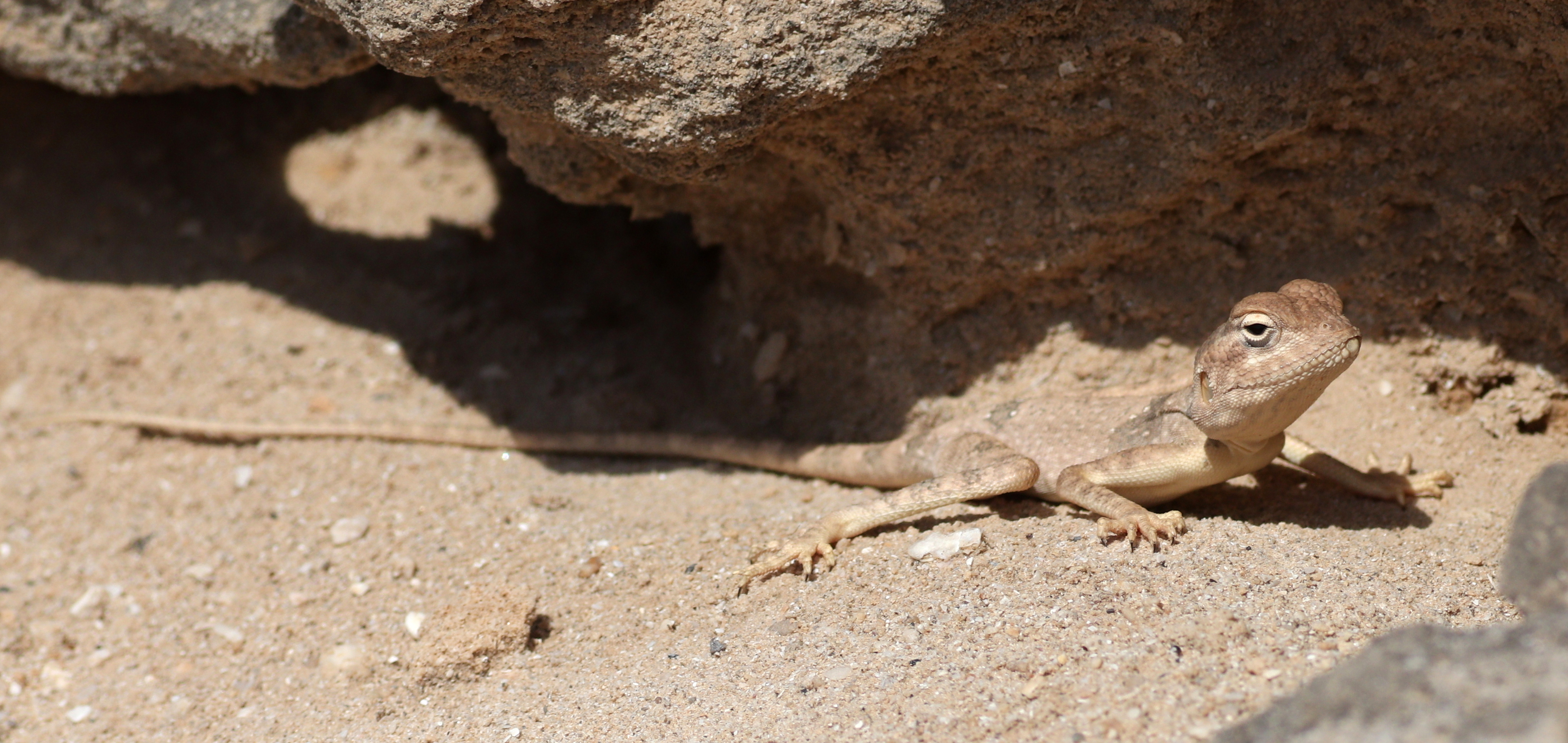

Scientific classification
- Domain: Eukaryota
- Kingdom: Animalia
- Phylum: Chordata
- Class: Reptilia
- Order: Squamata
- Suborder: Iguania
- Family: Agamidae
- Genus: Pseudotrapelus
- Species: P. dhofarensis

Binomial name
- Pseudotrapelus dhofarensis Melnikov & Pierson, 2012

= Pseudotrapelus dhofarensis =

Species of reptile

Pseudotrapelus dhofarensis is a species of Agama native to Oman.
