= Protodraco =

Protodraco Temporal range: Cenomanian

Scientific classification
- Kingdom: Animalia
- Phylum: Chordata
- Class: Reptilia
- Order: Squamata
- Suborder: Iguania
- Family: Agamidae
- Genus: †Protodraco; Wagner et al., 2021
- Species: †P. monocoli

Binomial name
- †Protodraco monocoli Wagner et al., 2021

Extinct genus of lizards

Protodraco is an extinct genus of agamid lizard that lived during the Cenomanian.

== Distribution ==
Protodraco monocoli fossils are known from the Burmese amber.
