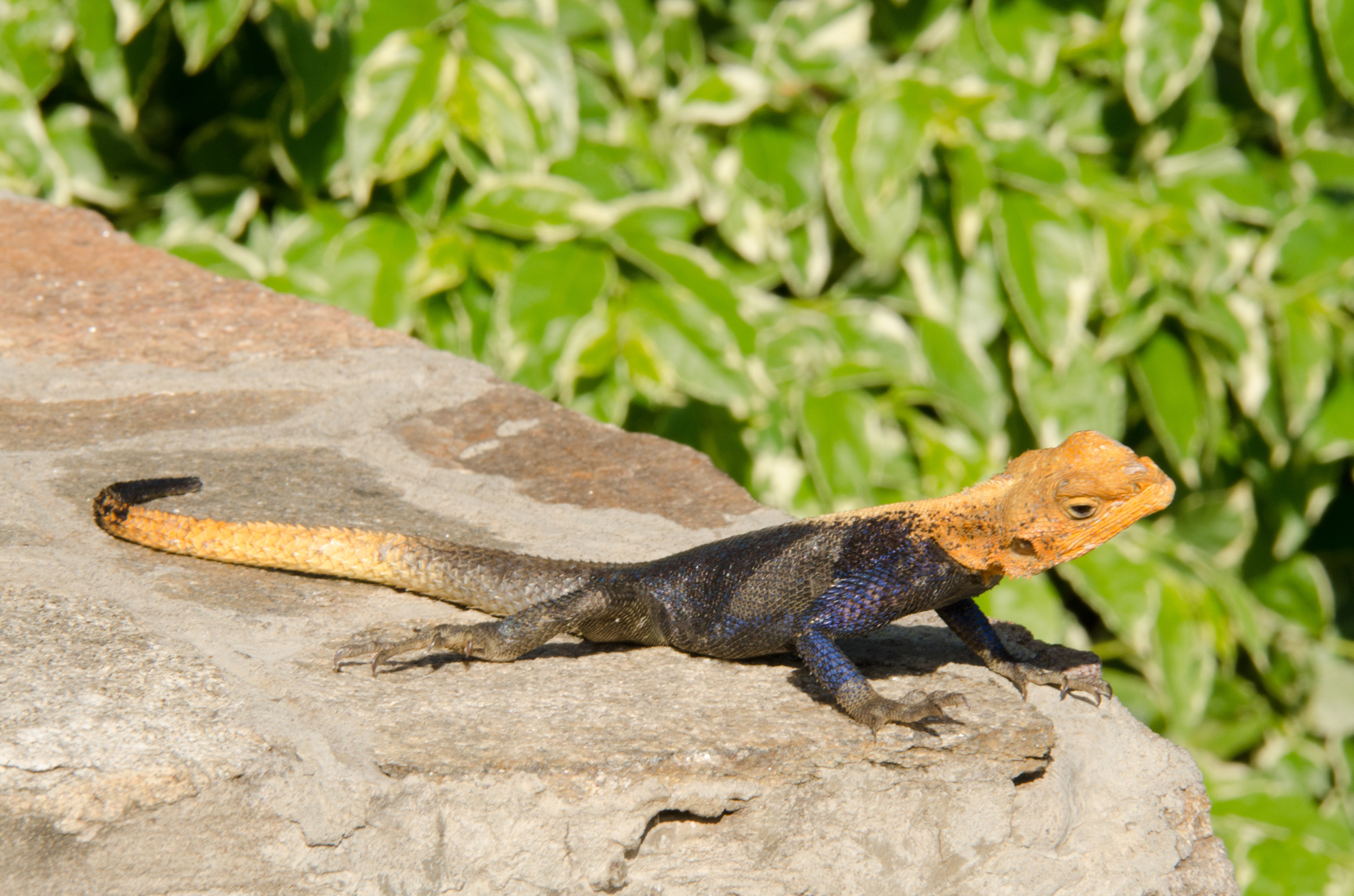

Conservation status
- Least Concern (IUCN 3.1)

Scientific classification
- Kingdom: Animalia
- Phylum: Chordata
- Class: Reptilia
- Order: Squamata
- Suborder: Iguania
- Family: Agamidae
- Genus: Agama
- Species: A. finchi

Binomial name
- Agama finchi Böhme, Wagner, Malonza, Lötters & J. Köhler, 2005

= Agama finchi =

Species of lizard

Agama finchi, commonly known as Finch's agama, is a small species of lizard in the family Agamidae. The species is native to Central Africa and East Africa. There are two recognized subspecies.

== Etymology ==
The specific name, finchi, is in honor of zoologist Brian W. Finch who discovered this species.

== Geographic range ==
A. finchi is found in the Central African Republic, Chad, the Democratic Republic of the Congo, Ethiopia, Kenya, and Uganda.

== Habitat ==
The preferred natural habitat of A. finchi is grassland.

== Description ==
Small for its genus, A. finchi does not exceed 25 cm (9.8 in) in total length (including tail).

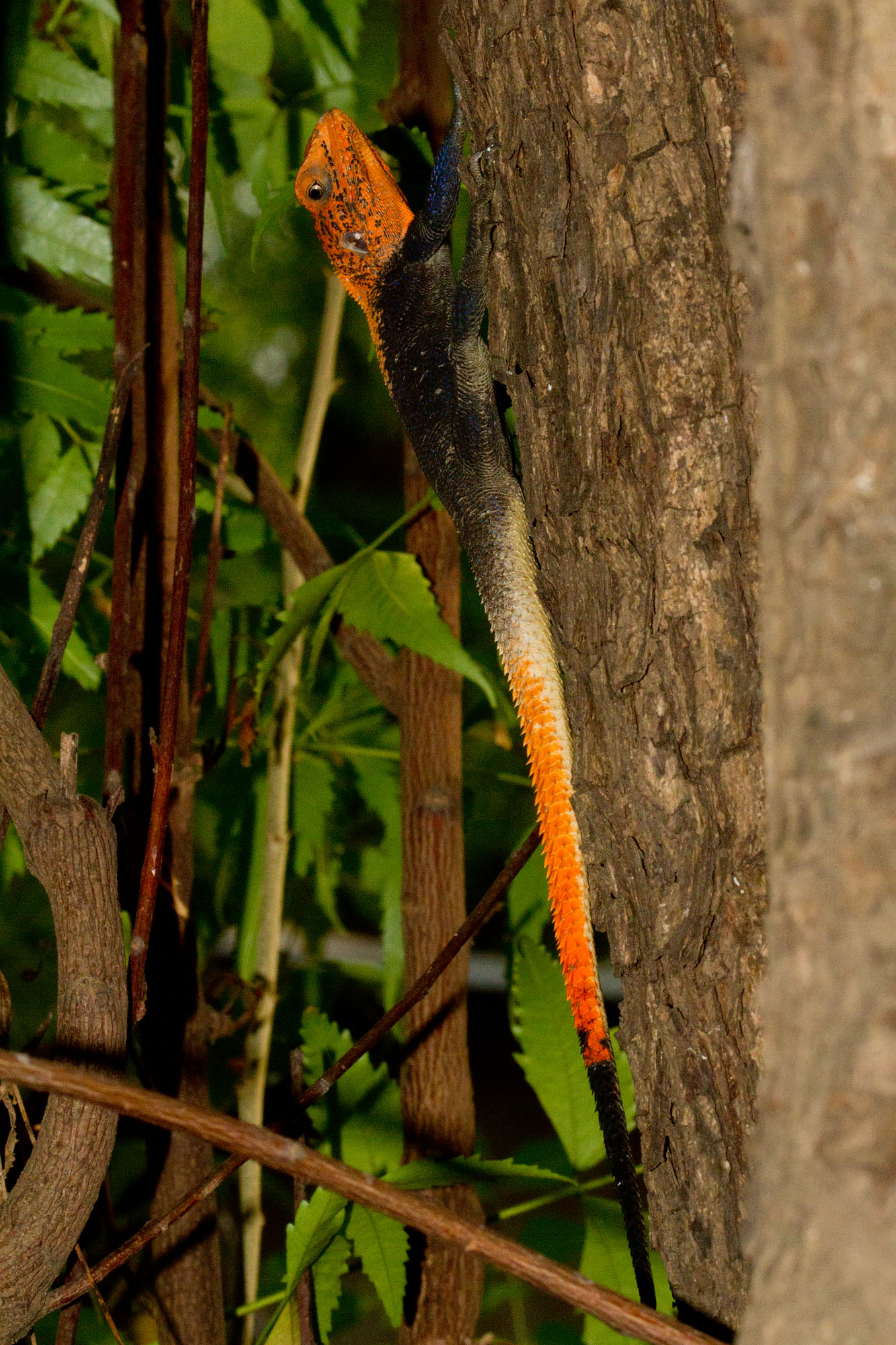
Male

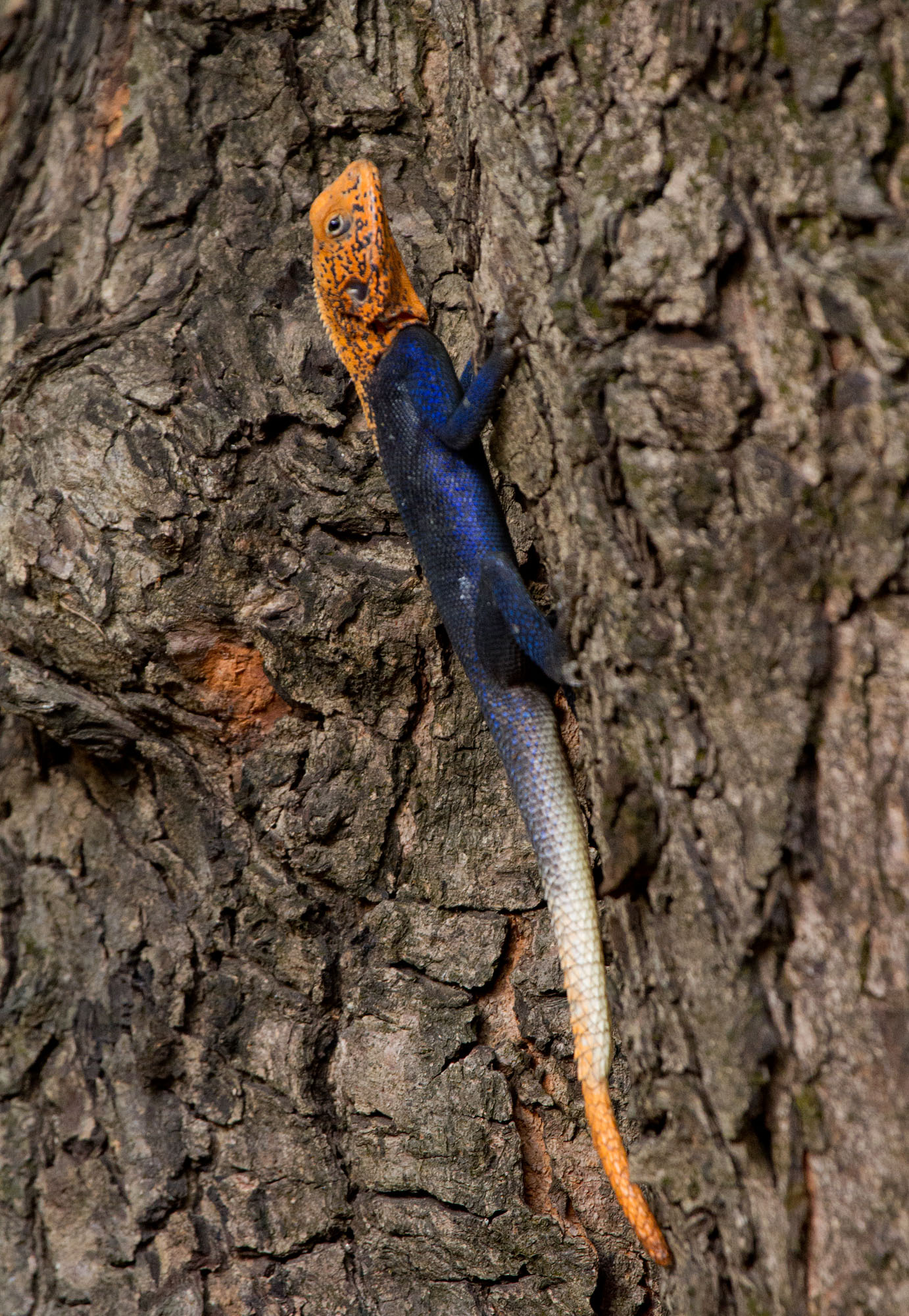
Male

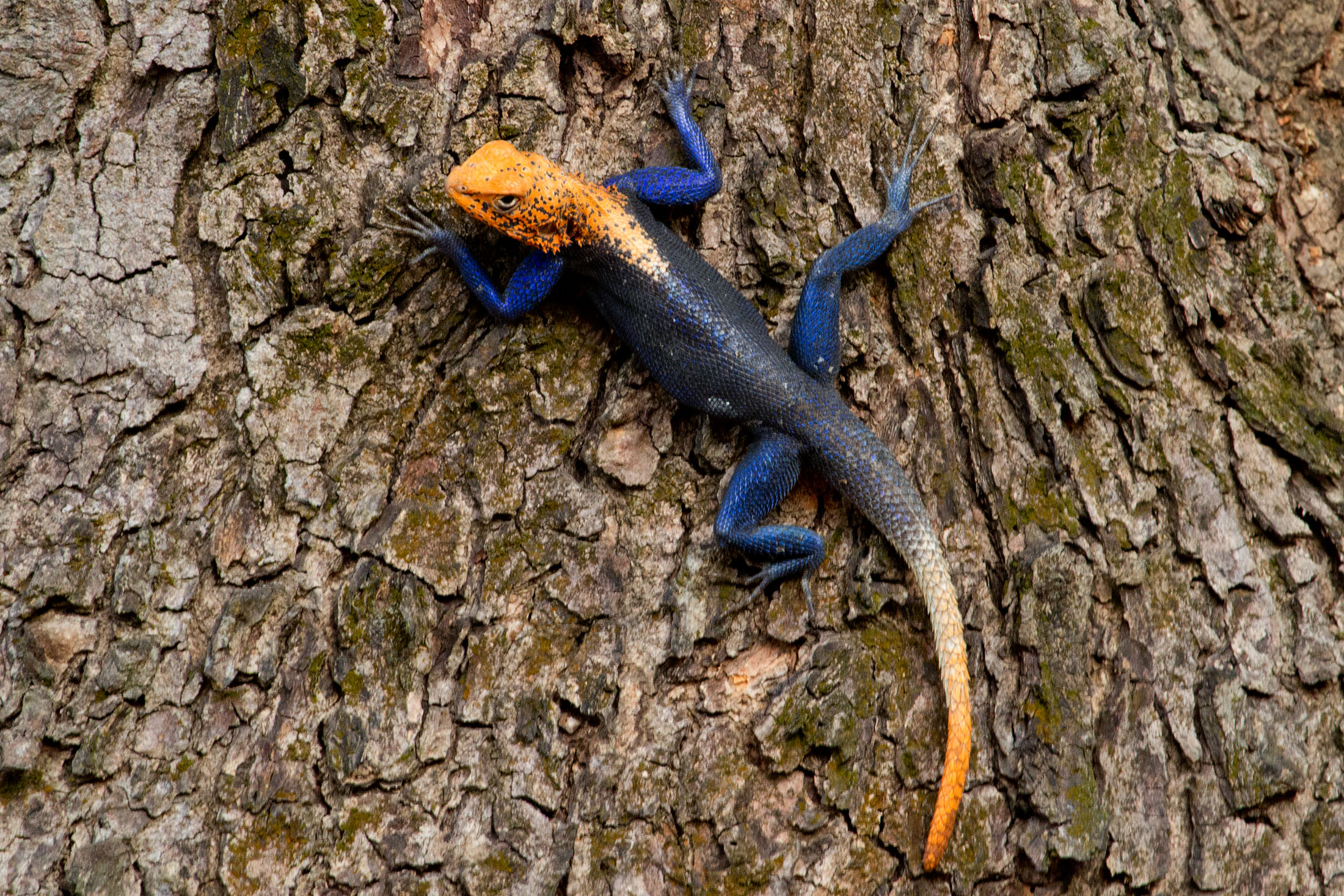
Male

== Reproduction ==
A. finchi is oviparous.

== Subspecies ==
Two subspecies are recognized as being valid including the nominotypical subspecies.

- Agama finchi finchi Böhme et al., 2005
- Agama finchi leucerythrolaema Wagner et al., 2011
