= Pseudotrapelus neumanni =

Scientific classification
- Kingdom: Animalia
- Phylum: Chordata
- Class: Reptilia
- Order: Squamata
- Suborder: Iguania
- Family: Agamidae
- Genus: Pseudotrapelus
- Species: P. neumanni

Binomial name
- Pseudotrapelus neumanni (Tornier, 1905)

Species of reptile

Pseudotrapelus neumanni, Neumann's agama, is a species of Agama native to Yemen and Saudi Arabia.

This species was named in honor of Oskar Neumann.
