= Xenagama wilmsi =

Conservation status
- Least Concern (IUCN 3.1)

Scientific classification
- Kingdom: Animalia
- Phylum: Chordata
- Class: Reptilia
- Order: Squamata
- Suborder: Iguania
- Family: Agamidae
- Genus: Xenagama
- Species: X. wilmsi

Binomial name
- Xenagama wilmsi Wagner, Mazuch, & Bauer, 2013

Species of lizard

Xenagama wilmsi, the Wilms' agama, shield-tail agama, or turnip-tail agama, is a species of lizard in the family Agamidae. The species is endemic to the Horn of Africa.

== Etymology ==
The specific name, wilsmi, is in honor of Dr. Thomas M. Wilms "in recognition of his important contributions to North African and Arabian reptiles in general and the spiny-tailed agamid genera Uromastyx and Saara in particular".

== Geographic range ==
X. wilmsi is found in Ethiopia and Somalia.

== Reproduction ==
X. wilmsi is oviparous.
