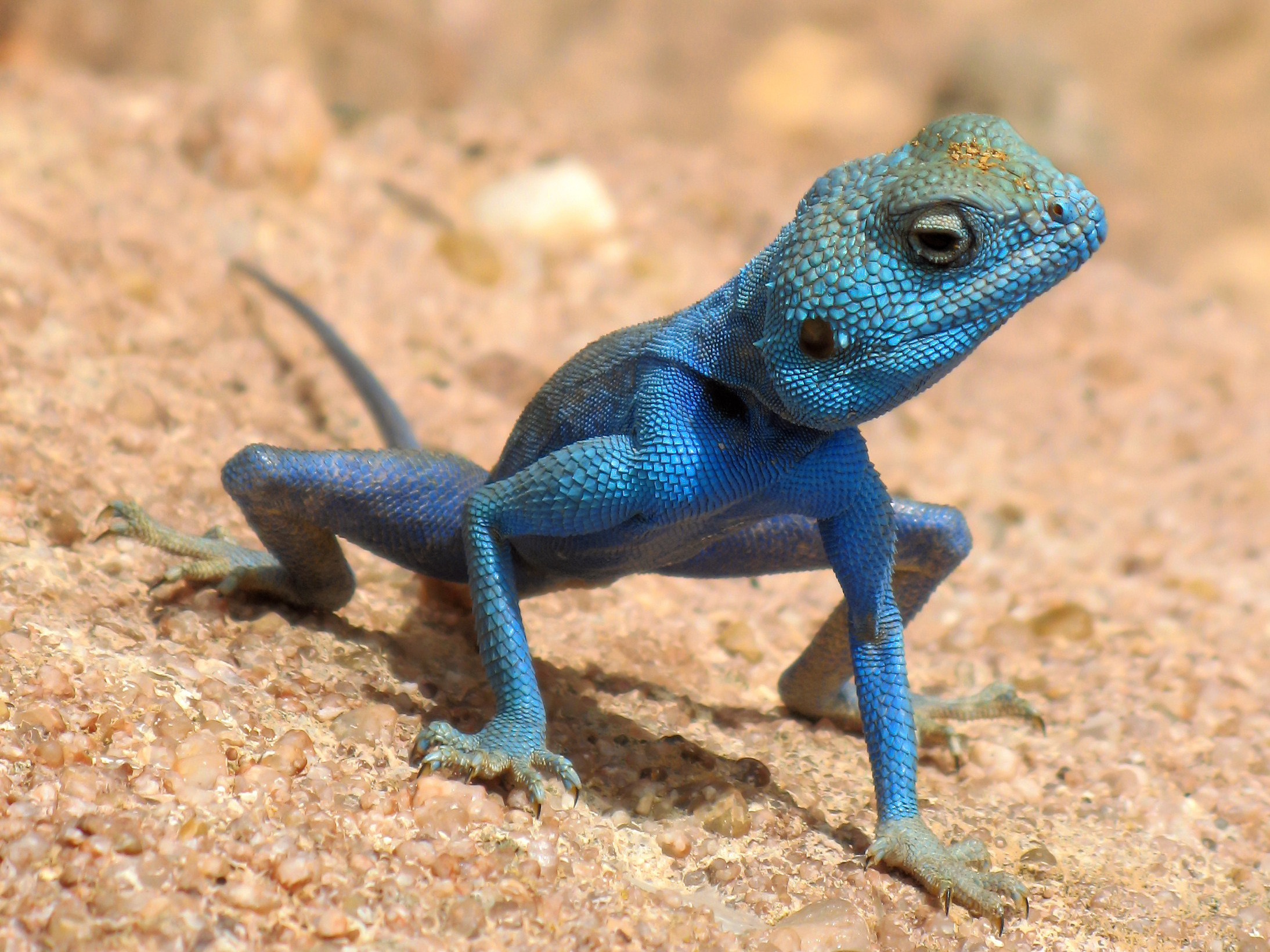
- Pseudotrapelus sinaitus, Sinai agama

Scientific classification
- Kingdom: Animalia
- Phylum: Chordata
- Class: Reptilia
- Order: Squamata
- Suborder: Iguania
- Family: Agamidae
- Subfamily: Agaminae
- Genus: Pseudotrapelus; Fitzinger, 1843

Species
- 6, see text

= Pseudotrapelus =

Genus of lizards

Pseudotrapelus is a genus of agamid lizards native to North Africa and southwest Asia. They are a medium-sized, rock-dwelling species that inhabit arid environments.

== Habitat ==
They live in arid environments living near rocks making them saxicolous. However they do inhabit a variety of hilly and mountainous regions, including well vegetated [wadi]]s and slopes, barren rocky hillsides, and boulder-strewn plains. They are dinural, with most of their activity occurring during the hottest time of day, making them heliophilous.

It is considered to be a widely distributed genus ranging across North Africa, Eastern Africa and southwestern Asia, specifically in the Arabian and Indian peninsulas. Within the Arabian peninsula, they are restricted by the hilly and mountainous areas that surround the peninsula and the Red Sea.

== Taxonomy ==
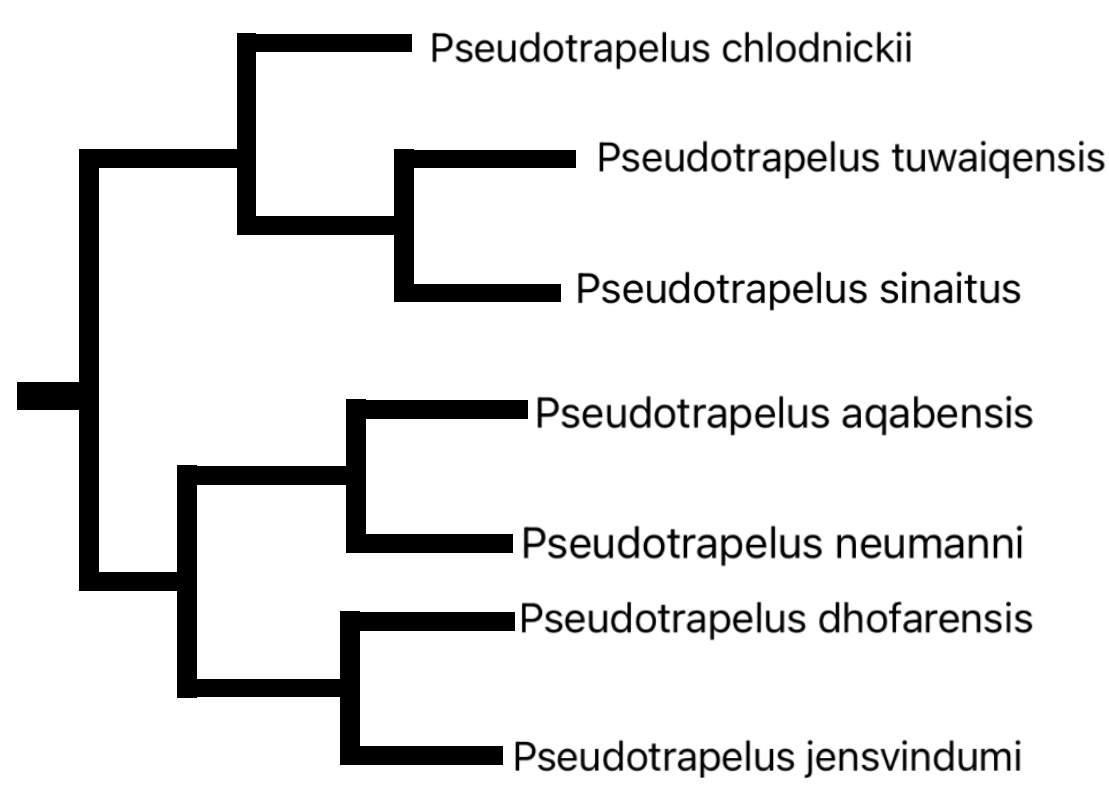
Phylogenetic tree of Pseudotrapelus based on Tamer et al. 2023

The taxonomy of this genus has been made difficult due to the conservative and homogeneous morphology of its members. Many have followed a conservative approach in treating most variations as a single species (an example of this is Pseudotrapelus sinaitus). Studies by Tamer et al. in 2016 and 2019 provided much needed information on the genus phylogeny, and revealed a hidden diversity of species, including an unnamed lineage from central Saudi Arabia that are phylogenetically close to Pseudotrapelus sinaitus and Pseudotrapelus chlodnickii.

Phylogenetic analysis reveals two major clades within Pseudotrapelus (clade l and clade ll). In the first clade there are three species (P. chlodnickii, P. tuwaiqensos and P. sinaitus). P. tuwaiqensos and P. sinaitus are sister species, with P. chlodnickii being the out group. In the second clade there are four species (P. jensvinsumi, P. aqabensis, P. dhofarensis and P. neumanni). P. jensvindumi and P. dhofarensis are sister species, with P. aquabensis and P. neumanni being sister species to each other.

The genus began to speciate during the Oligocene and late Miocene epochs, when regions near the Red Sea started to experienced major environmental changes. These changes included the movement of tectonic plates, geologic activity and a shift in climatic conditions to aridity.

== Species ==
Listed alphabetically by specific name.

Male	Female	Scientific name	Common name	Distribution
		Pseudotrapelus aqabensis Melnikov, Nazarov, Ananjeva, & Disi, 2012	Aqaba agama	Jordan, Egypt (Sinai), Israel, and Saudi Arabia
		Pseudotrapelus chlodnickii Melnikov, Smielowski, Melnikova, Nazarov & Ananjeva, 2015		Sudan, Egypt (including the western Sinai Peninsula) and Libya
		Pseudotrapelus dhofarensis Melnikov & Pierson, 2012		central and southern Oman and possibly in the Hadhramaut area in south-eastern Yemen
		Pseudotrapelus jensvindumi Melnikov, Ananjeva, & Papenfuss, 2013		Al Hajar Mountains in northern Oman and the United Arab Emirates
		Pseudotrapelus neumanni (Tornier, 1905)	Neumann's agama	Yemen and southern Saudi Arabia
		Pseudotrapelus sinaitus (Heyden, 1827)	Sinai agama	Jordan, Syria and the Sinai Peninsula (Egypt).
		Pseudotrapelus tuwaiqensis (Tamar, 2023)	Tuwaiq agama	Saudi Arabia

Nota bene: A binomial authority in parentheses indicates that the species was originally described in a genus other than Pseudotrapelus.
