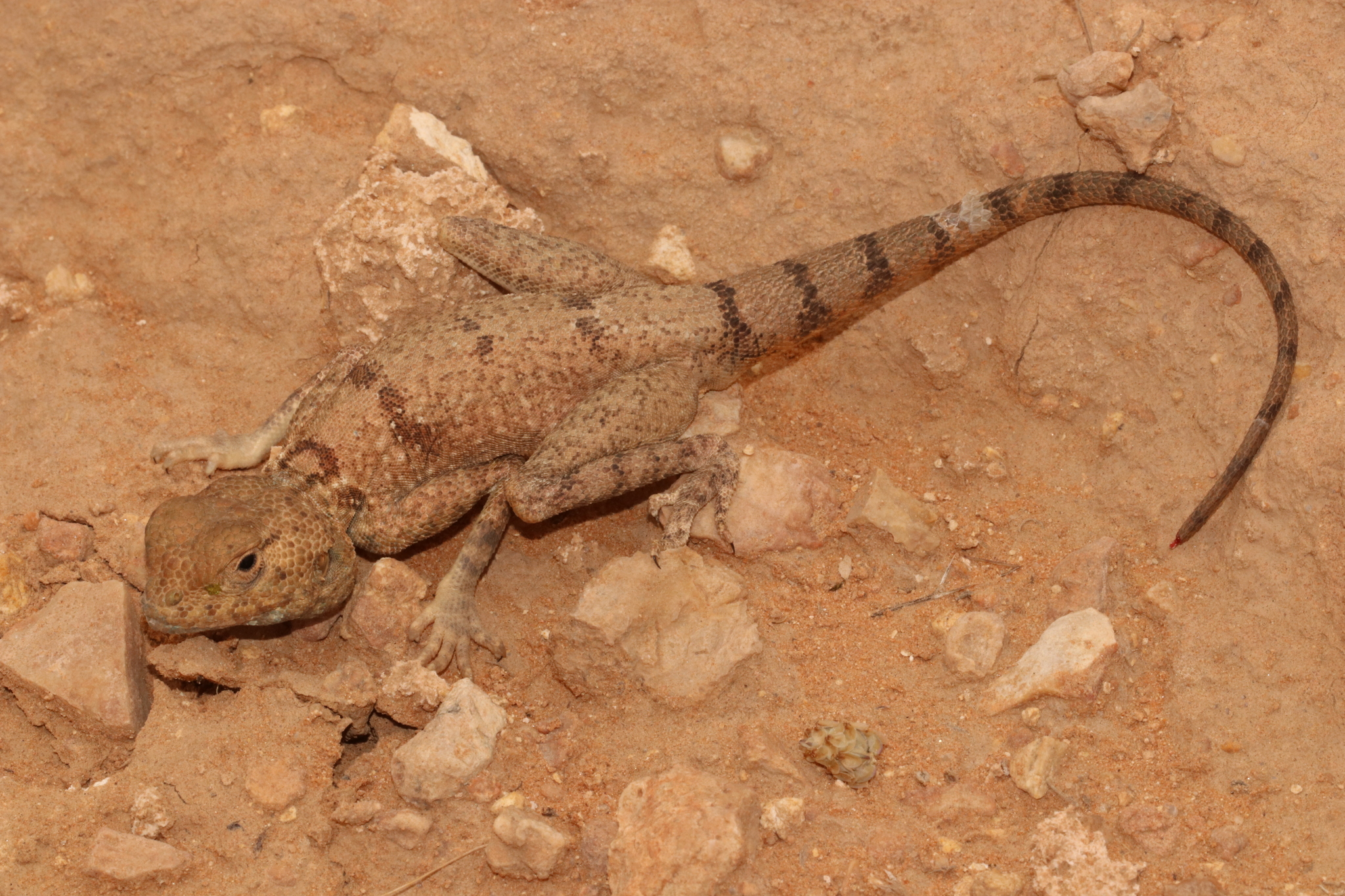
- Male, Saudi Arabia
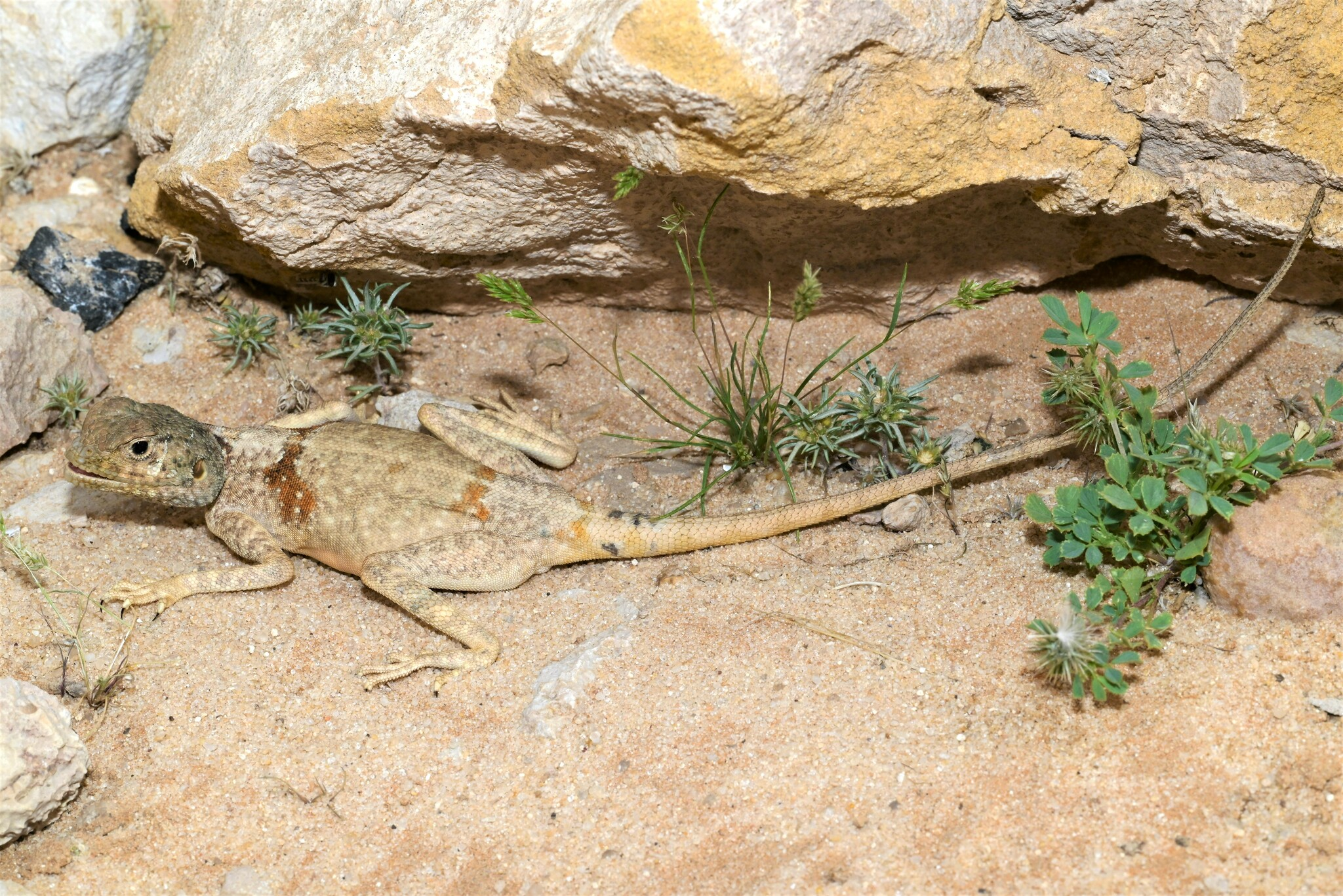
- Female, Saudi Arabia

Scientific classification
- Kingdom: Animalia
- Phylum: Chordata
- Class: Reptilia
- Order: Squamata
- Suborder: Iguania
- Family: Agamidae
- Genus: Pseudotrapelus
- Species: P. tuwaiqensis

Binomial name
- Pseudotrapelus tuwaiqensis Karin Tamar et al, 2023

= Pseudotrapelus tuwaiqensis =

Species of reptile

Pseudotrapelus tuwaiqensis is a species of agama native to central Saudi Arabia.

== Gallery ==
3rd toe longer than 4th

4–7 preanal pores; here 5
