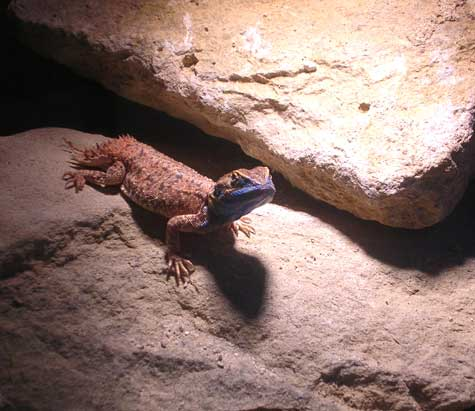
- Xenagama taylori

Scientific classification
- Kingdom: Animalia
- Phylum: Chordata
- Class: Reptilia
- Order: Squamata
- Suborder: Iguania
- Family: Agamidae
- Subfamily: Agaminae
- Genus: Xenagama; Parker, 1935

= Xenagama =

Genus of lizards

Xenagama is a genus of lizards in the family Agamidae. Species of the genus are native to Ethiopia and Somalia.

== Species ==
The following four species are recognized as being valid.

- Xenagama batillifera (Vaillant, 1882) – beaver-tailed agama, (dwarf) turnip-tailed agama
- Xenagama taylori (Parker, 1935) – dwarf shield-tailed agama, shield-tailed agama, Taylor's strange agama, turnip-tailed agama
- Xenagama wilmsi Wagner, Mazuch & Bauer, 2013 - Wilms's agama, shield-tail agama, turnip-tail agama
- Xenagama zonura (Boulenger, 1895) - Ethiopian ridgeback agama

Nota bene: A binomial authority in parentheses indicates that the species was originally described in a genus other than Xenagama.
