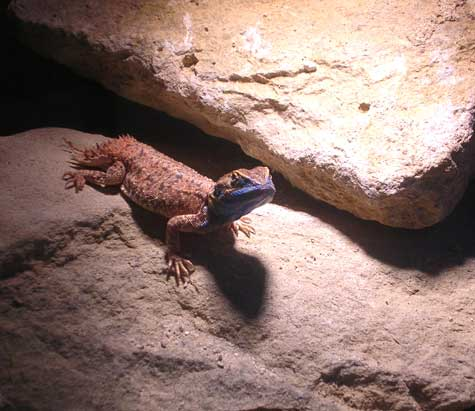

Conservation status
- Least Concern (IUCN 3.1)

Scientific classification
- Kingdom: Animalia
- Phylum: Chordata
- Class: Reptilia
- Order: Squamata
- Suborder: Iguania
- Family: Agamidae
- Genus: Xenagama
- Species: X. taylori

Binomial name
- Xenagama taylori (Parker, 1935)

Synonyms
- Agama (Xenagama) taylori Parker, 1935; Agama taylori — Wermuth, 1967; Xenagama taylori — Lanza, 1983

= Shield-tailed agama =

Species of lizard

The shield-tailed agama (Xenagama taylori), also known commonly as the dwarf shield-tailed agama, Taylor's strange agama, and the turnip-tailed agama, is a species of lizard in the family Agamidae. The species is endemic to the Horn of Africa.

== Etymology ==
The specific name, taylori, is in honor of British army officer Captain R. H. R. Taylor.

== Geographic range ==
X. taylori is found in eastern Ethiopia, Somalia, and Somaliland.

== Reproduction ==
X. taylori is oviparous.

== Habitat ==
X. taylori lives on arid, flat land, sometimes on hilly landscapes, sandy but also hard ground, where it digs deep galleries. It survives at 45 to 50 °C (113 to 122 °F) maximum temperature, but average ranges between 25 and 35 °C (77 and 95 °F) in very dry environments, with the exception of strong spring storms and high humidity.

== Description ==
Adults of X. taylori are less than 10 cm (3.9 in) in total length (including tail), and hatchlings are just over a centimeter (3/8 inch) and weigh only 3 grams (0.11 ounces).

== Defensive behavior ==
Like most other Xenagama species, X. taylori will shelter within self-made burrows and use the whorl-like, heavily built tail to close the burrow to evade predators.

== Diet ==
Being a small lizard, X. taylori is essentially insectivorous, but has been seen to eat grasses, fruits, and berries.

== Sexual dimorphism ==
X. taylori is sexually dimorphic. Sexually mature males display a breeding coloration of vibrant blue on the throat for a short time of the year. Mature males possess larger femoral pores enclosed by a waxy pheromonal yellow substance.
