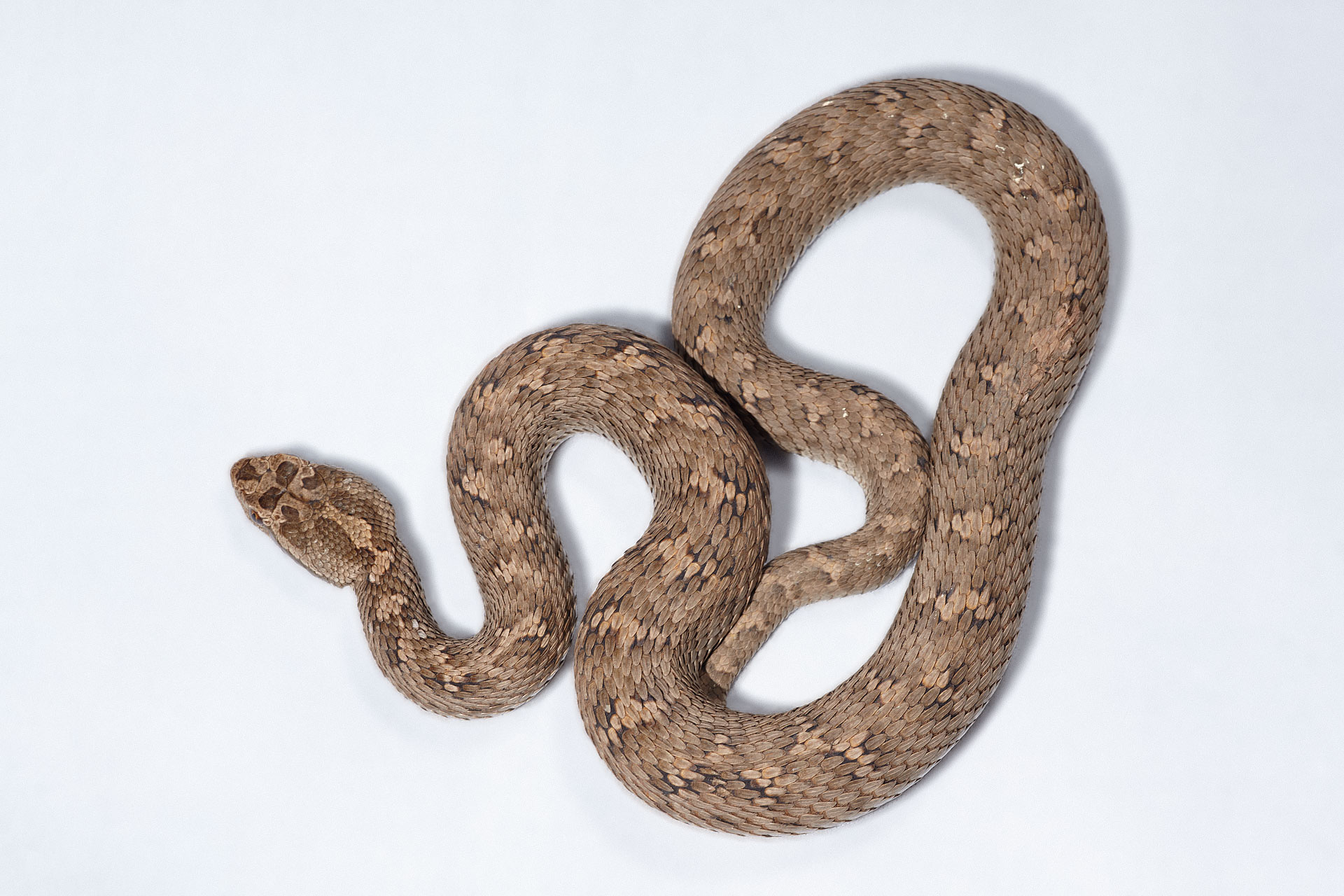

Scientific classification
- Kingdom: Animalia
- Phylum: Chordata
- Class: Reptilia
- Order: Squamata
- Suborder: Serpentes
- Family: Viperidae
- Genus: Gloydius
- Species: G. rickmersi

Binomial name
- Gloydius rickmersi Wagner et al., 2015

= Gloydius rickmersi =

Species of Kyrgyz snake

Gloydius rickmersi is a species of Asian moccasin from Kyrgyzstan, named after Willi Rickmer Rickmers. As with all pit vipers, it is venomous.

== Description ==
A slender and small snake, Gloydius rickmersi measures up to 47.9 cm. Its head is triangular, and it has 26-29 band-markings along its tan body. It can also be distinguished by its specific scale counts.

== Behaviour ==
Gloydius rickmersi is known to inhabit rocky, dry areas as well as wet meadows at an elevation of 3,000 m. It also appears to be nocturnal.
