= Pseudotrapelus chlodnickii =

Conservation status
- Least Concern (IUCN 3.1)

Scientific classification
- Kingdom: Animalia
- Phylum: Chordata
- Class: Reptilia
- Order: Squamata
- Suborder: Iguania
- Family: Agamidae
- Genus: Pseudotrapelus
- Species: P. chlodnickii

Binomial name
- Pseudotrapelus chlodnickii Melnikov, Śmiełowski, Melnikova, Nazarov, & Ananjeva, 2015

Species of reptile

Pseudotrapelus chlodnickii is a species of Agama native to Sudan and Libya. This species is named in honor of Marek Chłodnicki.
