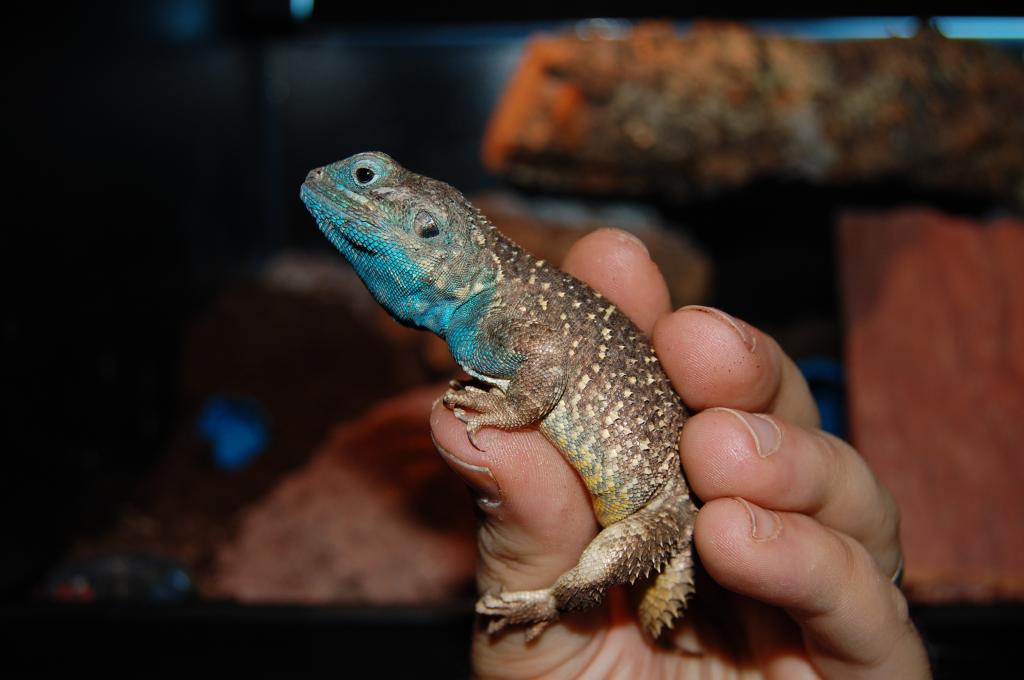

Conservation status
- Least Concern (IUCN 3.1)

Scientific classification
- Kingdom: Animalia
- Phylum: Chordata
- Class: Reptilia
- Order: Squamata
- Suborder: Iguania
- Family: Agamidae
- Genus: Xenagama
- Species: X. batillifera

Binomial name
- Xenagama batillifera (Vaillant, 1882)

= Xenagama batillifera =

Species of lizard

The Vaillant's strange agama, shield-tail agama or turnip-tail agama (Xenagama batillifera), is a species of lizard in the family Agamidae. The species is endemic to the Horn of Africa.

== Geographic range ==
X. batillifera is limited to northwestern Somalia and east Ethiopia.

== Reproduction ==
X. batillifera is oviparous.
