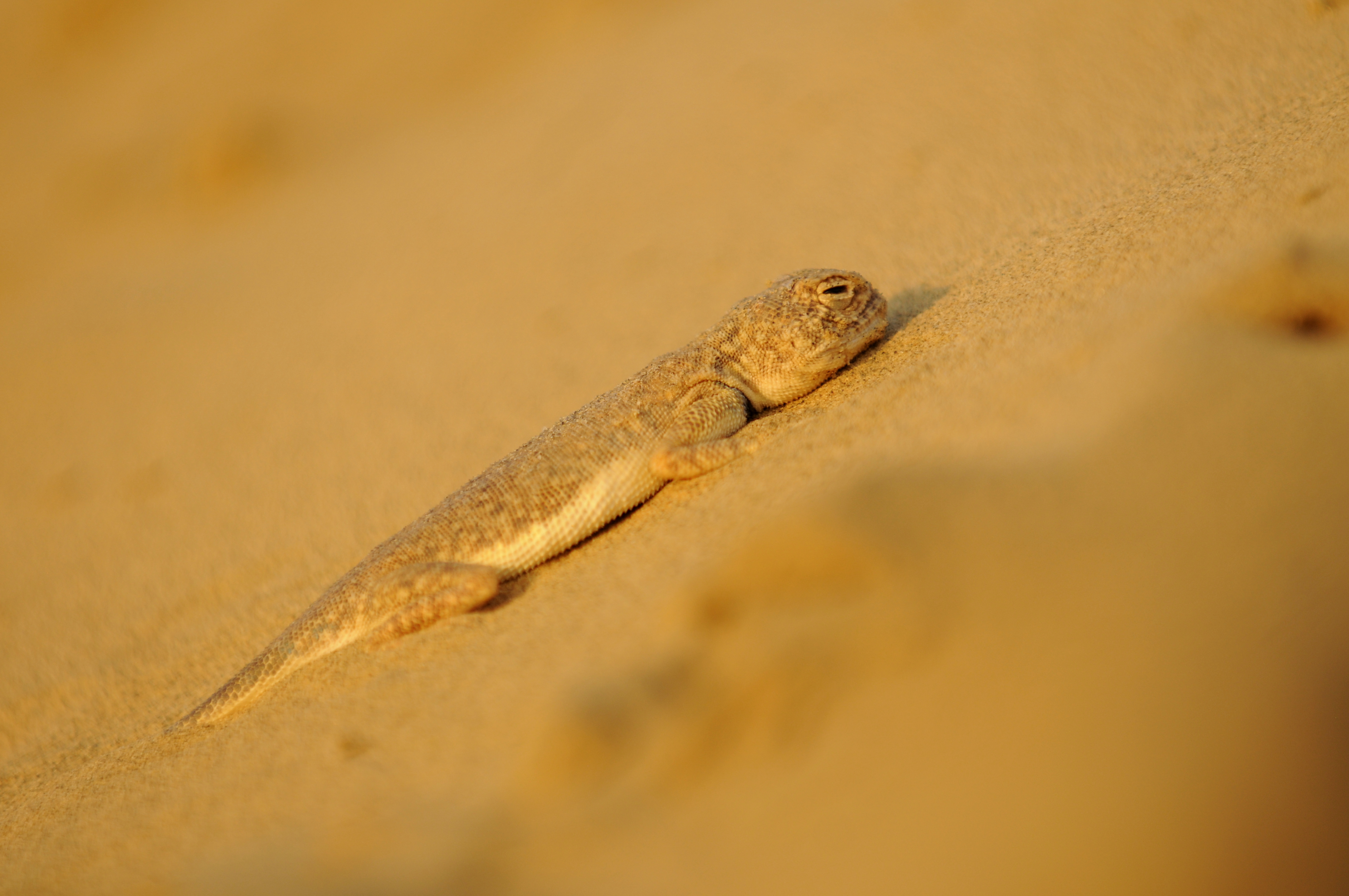
- On desert sand (Rajasthan)

Conservation status
- Least Concern (IUCN 3.1)

Scientific classification
- Kingdom: Animalia
- Phylum: Chordata
- Class: Reptilia
- Order: Squamata
- Suborder: Iguania
- Family: Agamidae
- Genus: Bufoniceps; Arnold, 1992
- Species: B. laungwalaensis

Binomial name
- Bufoniceps laungwalaensis (Sharma, 1978)

Synonyms
- Phrynocephalus laungwalaensis Sharma, 1980; Bufoniceps laungwalaensis — Arnold, 1992; Bufoniceps laungwalensis — Das, 1996: 43

= Rajasthan toad-headed lizard =

Species of lizard

The Rajasthan toad-headed lizard (Bufoniceps laungwalaensis), also known commonly as the Laungwala long-headed lizard and the Laungwala toad-headed agama, is a species of lizard in the subfamily Agaminae of the family Agamidae. The species is endemic to India.

== Taxonomy ==
Bufoniceps laungwalaensis is the only species in the genus Bufoniceps.

== Description ==
Bufoniceps laungwalaensis may attain a snout-to-vent length (SVL) of 7 cm (2.8 in). The external ear opening is very small, and the tympanum is deeply set. The digits have fringes of flat, pointed scales. There is no gular sac, and there are no femoral pores nor preanal pores.

== Geographic distribution ==
In India, Bufoniceps laungwalaensis is found in the Rajasthan Desert, in Jaisalmer District. The type locality is recorded as Laungwala, Jaisalmer District, Rajasthan, India.

== Habitat ==
The preferred natural habitat of Bufoniceps laungwalaensis is desert sand dunes.

== Behavior ==
Bufoniceps laungwalaensis is terrestrial. It does not excavate burrows, but can bury itself in sand by "shivering".

== Diet ==
Bufoniceps laungwalaensis preys upon insects of the orders Coleoptera, Diptera, Hymenoptera, and Orthoptera, and it also preys upon small lizards.

== Reproduction ==
Bufoniceps laungwalaensis is oviparous.

== Gallery ==
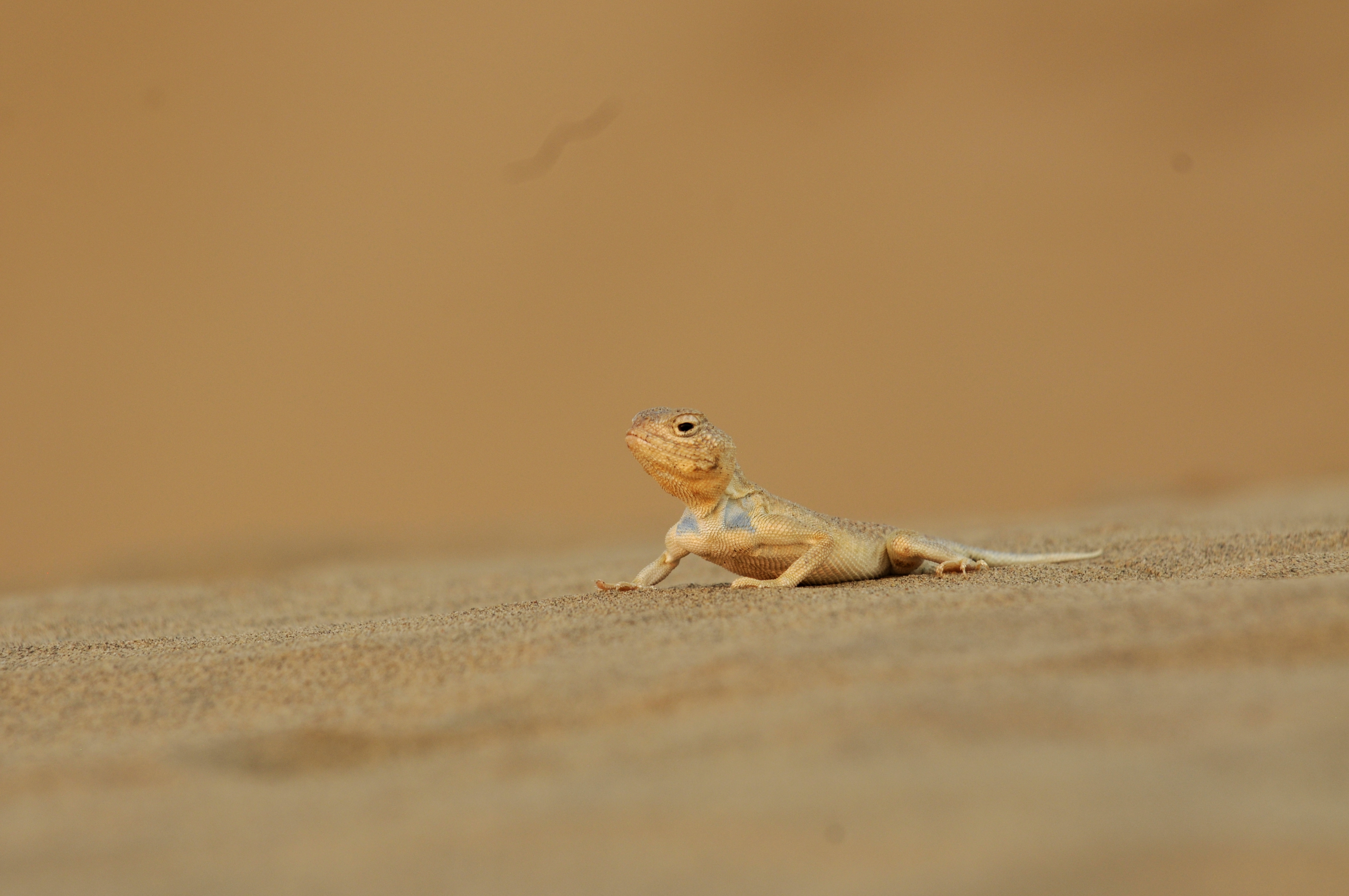
In Rajasthan, India (frontal view)

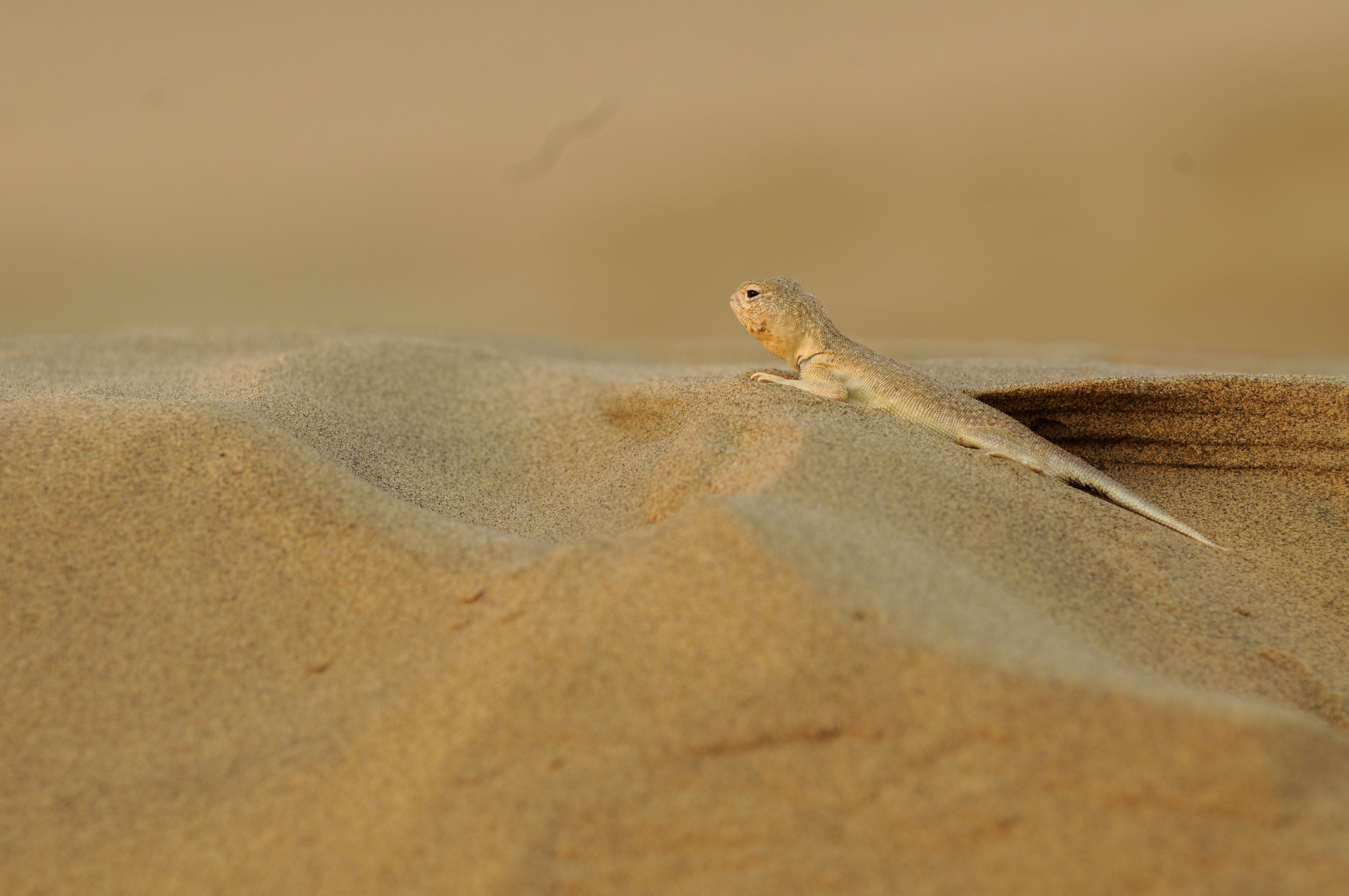
In Rajasthan, India (lateral view)

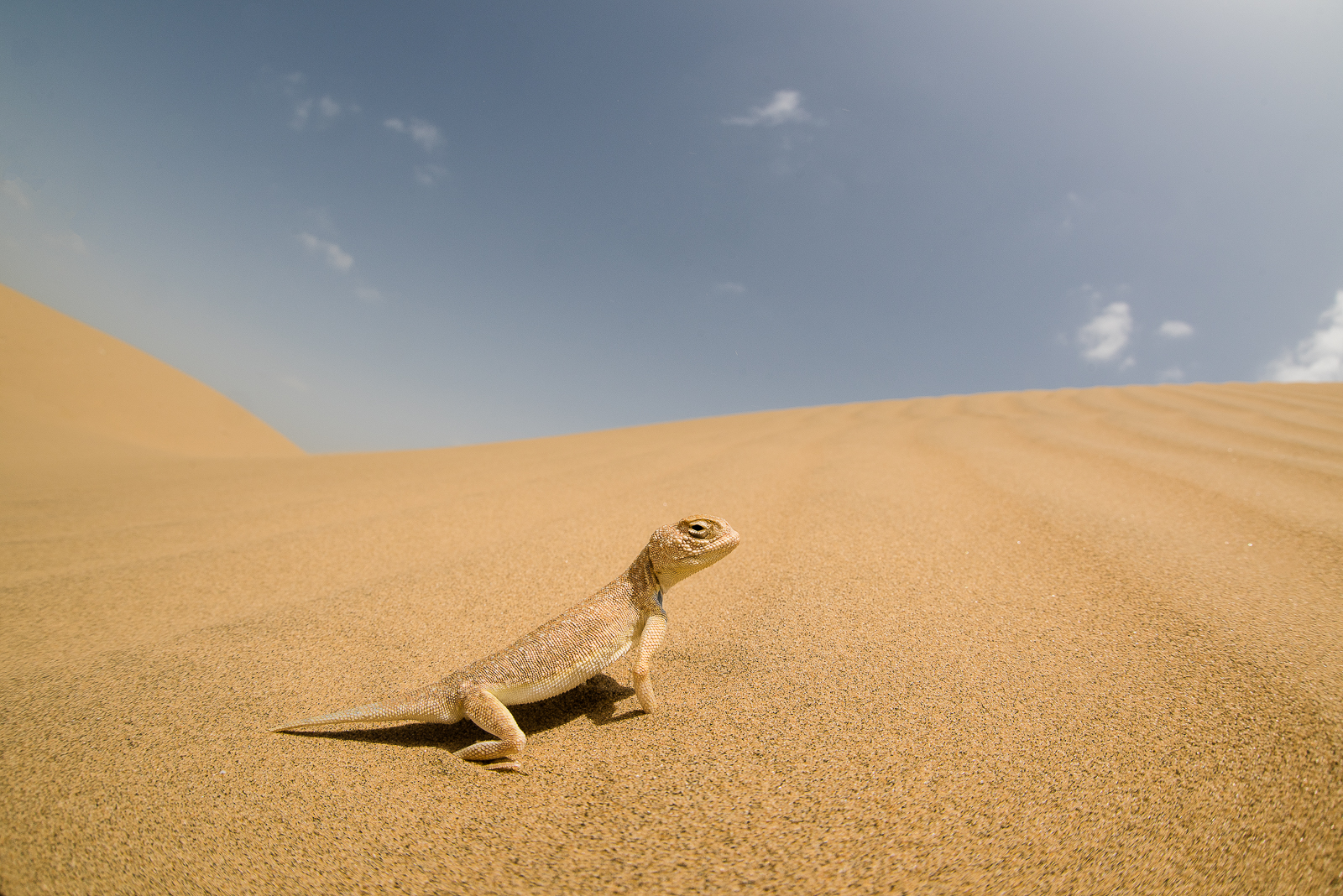
In Rajasthan, India (habitat view)
