= Pseudotrapelus aqabensis =

Scientific classification
- Kingdom: Animalia
- Phylum: Chordata
- Class: Reptilia
- Order: Squamata
- Suborder: Iguania
- Family: Agamidae
- Genus: Pseudotrapelus
- Species: P. aqabensis

Binomial name
- Pseudotrapelus aqabensis Melnikov, Nazarov, Ananjeva, & Disi, 2012

Synonyms
- Pseudotrapelus aqabensis Melnikov, Nazarov, Ananjeva & Disi, 2012; Pseudotrapelus aqabensis — Meiri et al., 2019

Species of reptile

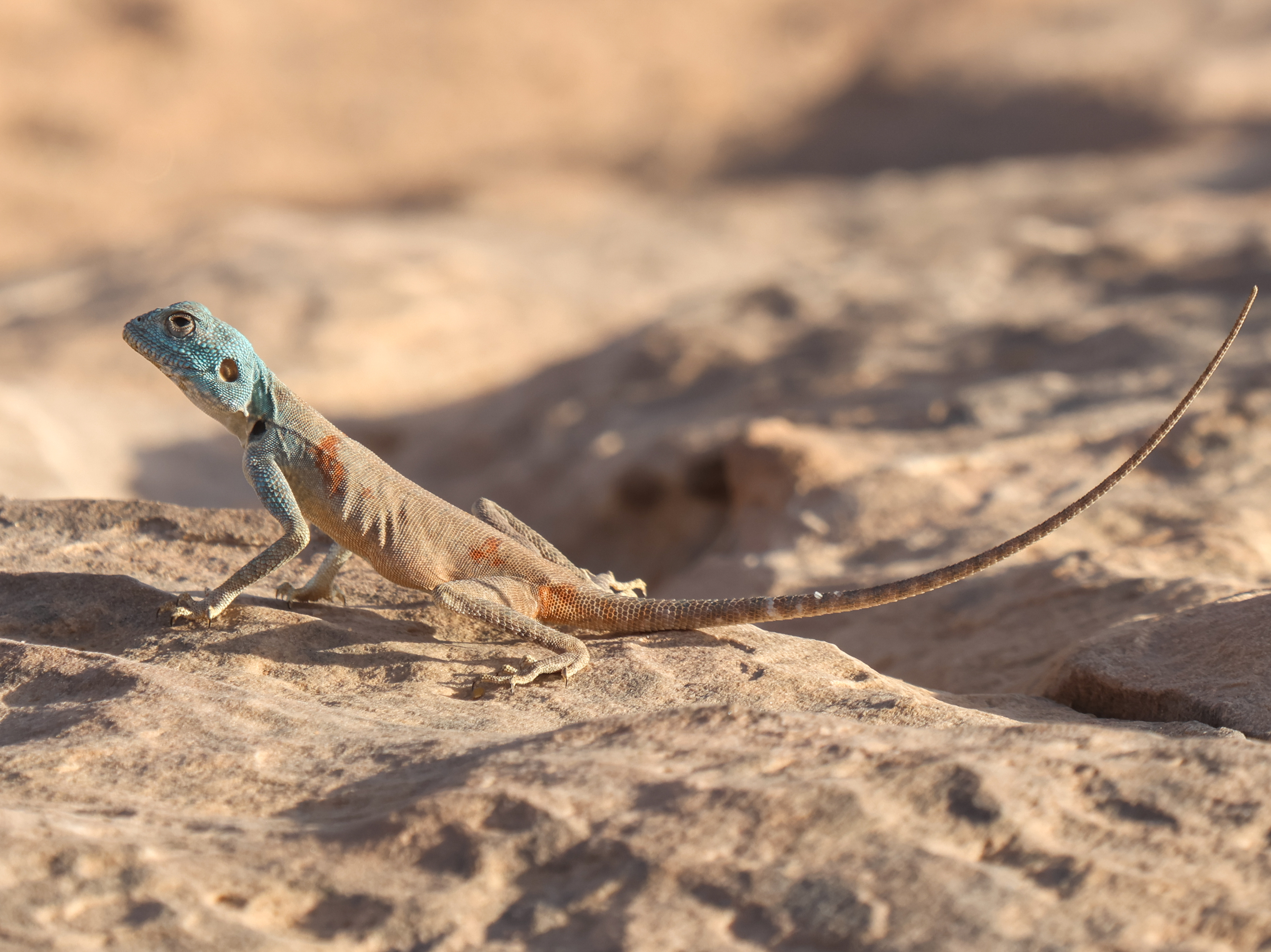
Pseudotrapelus aqabensis from Tabuk, Saudi Arabia

Pseudotrapelus aqabensis, known as Aqaba agama, is a species of agama native to southern Jordan, Egypt (Sinai), Israel, and northern Saudi Arabia.

== Etymology ==
The binomial name, aqabensis, is named after the location in which the holotype was found, Aqaba.
