= Pseudotrapelus jensvindumi =

Scientific classification
- Kingdom: Animalia
- Phylum: Chordata
- Class: Reptilia
- Order: Squamata
- Suborder: Iguania
- Family: Agamidae
- Genus: Pseudotrapelus
- Species: P. jensvindumi

Binomial name
- Pseudotrapelus jensvindumi Melnikov, Ananjeva, & Papenfuss, 2013

Species of reptile

Pseudotrapelus jensvindumi, the east Arabian desert agama, is a species of agama native to Oman and the United Arab Emirates.

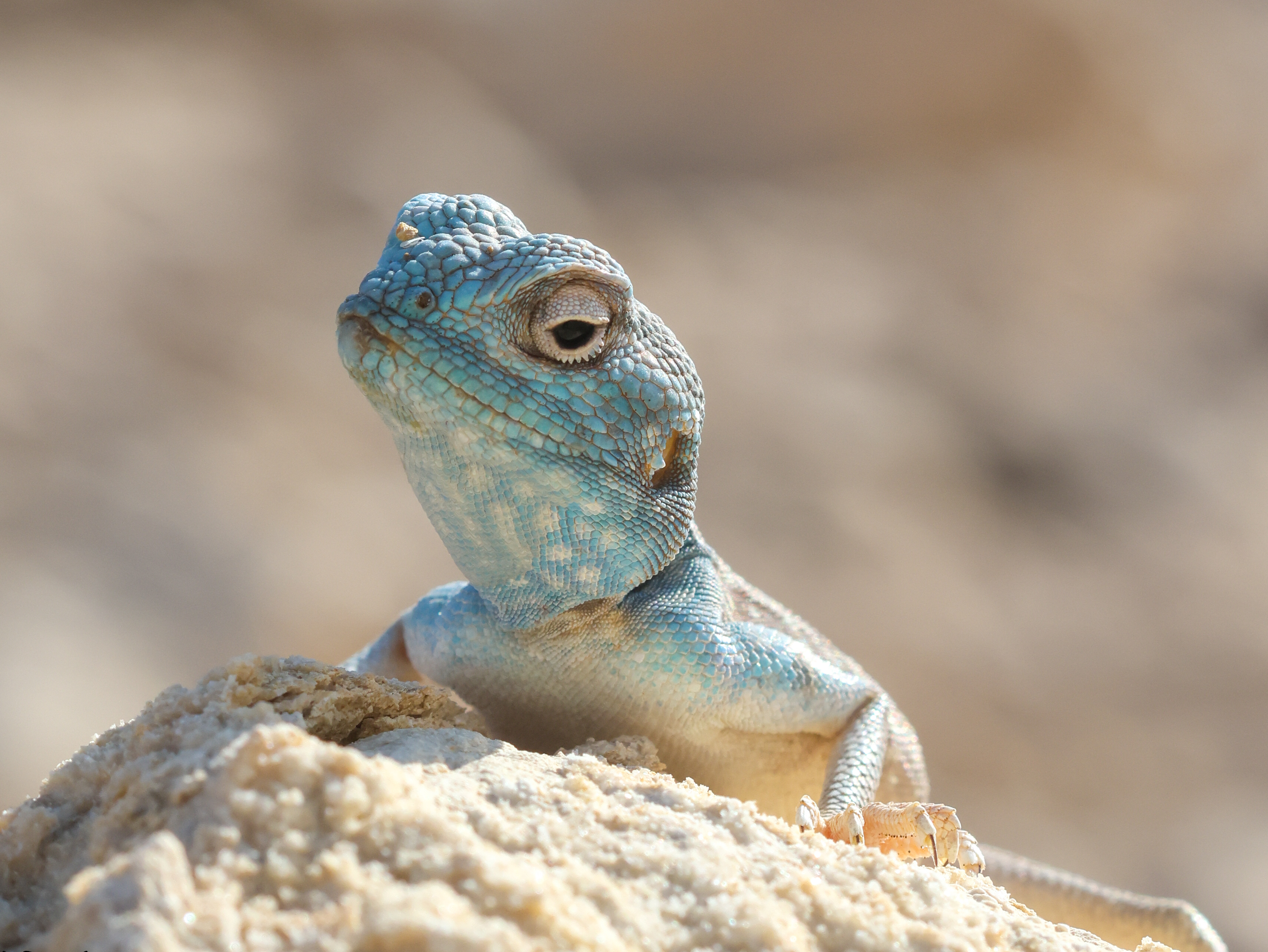
Pseudotrapelus jensvindumi from Al Ain, UAE

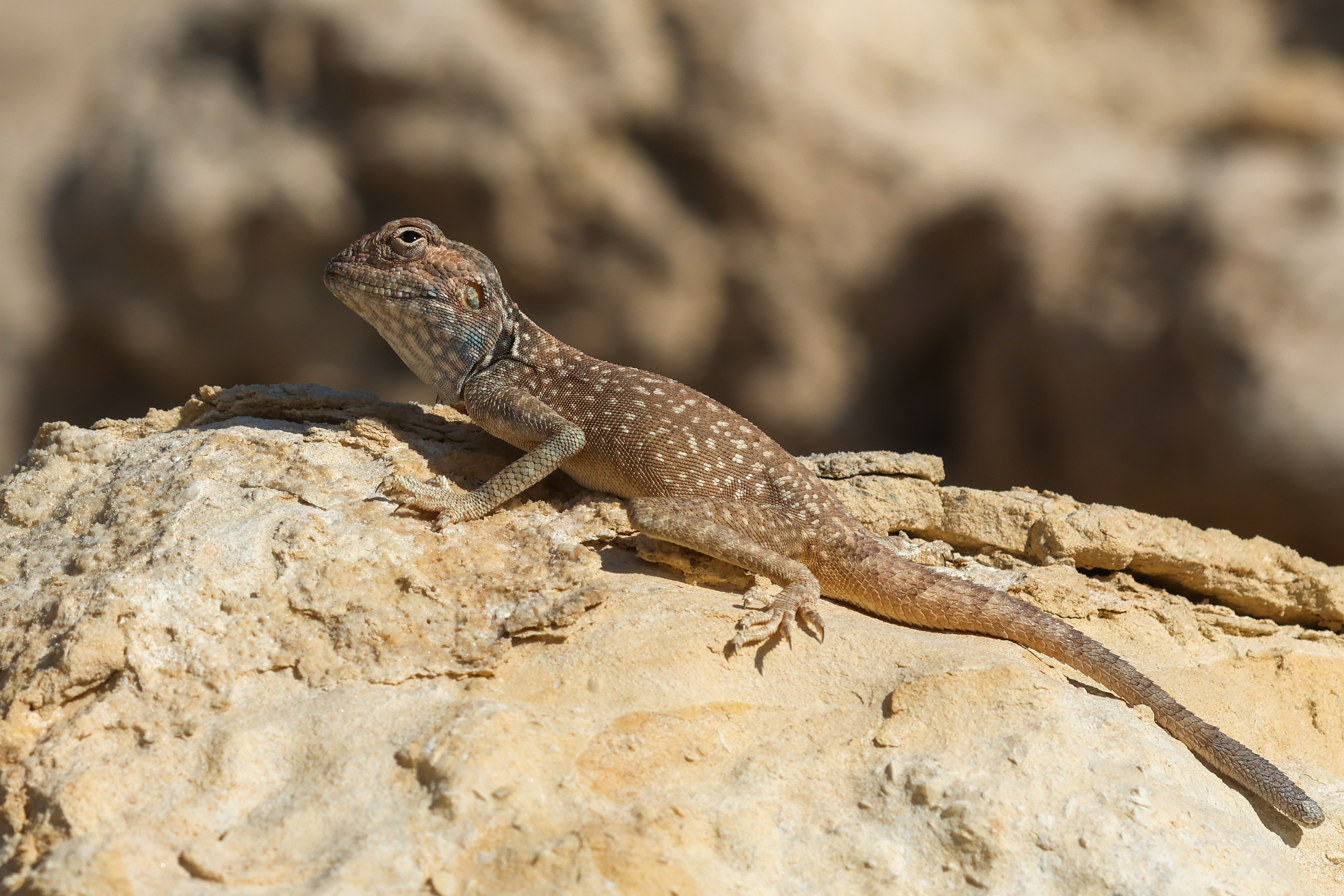
Pseudotrapelus jensvindumi basking under the sun

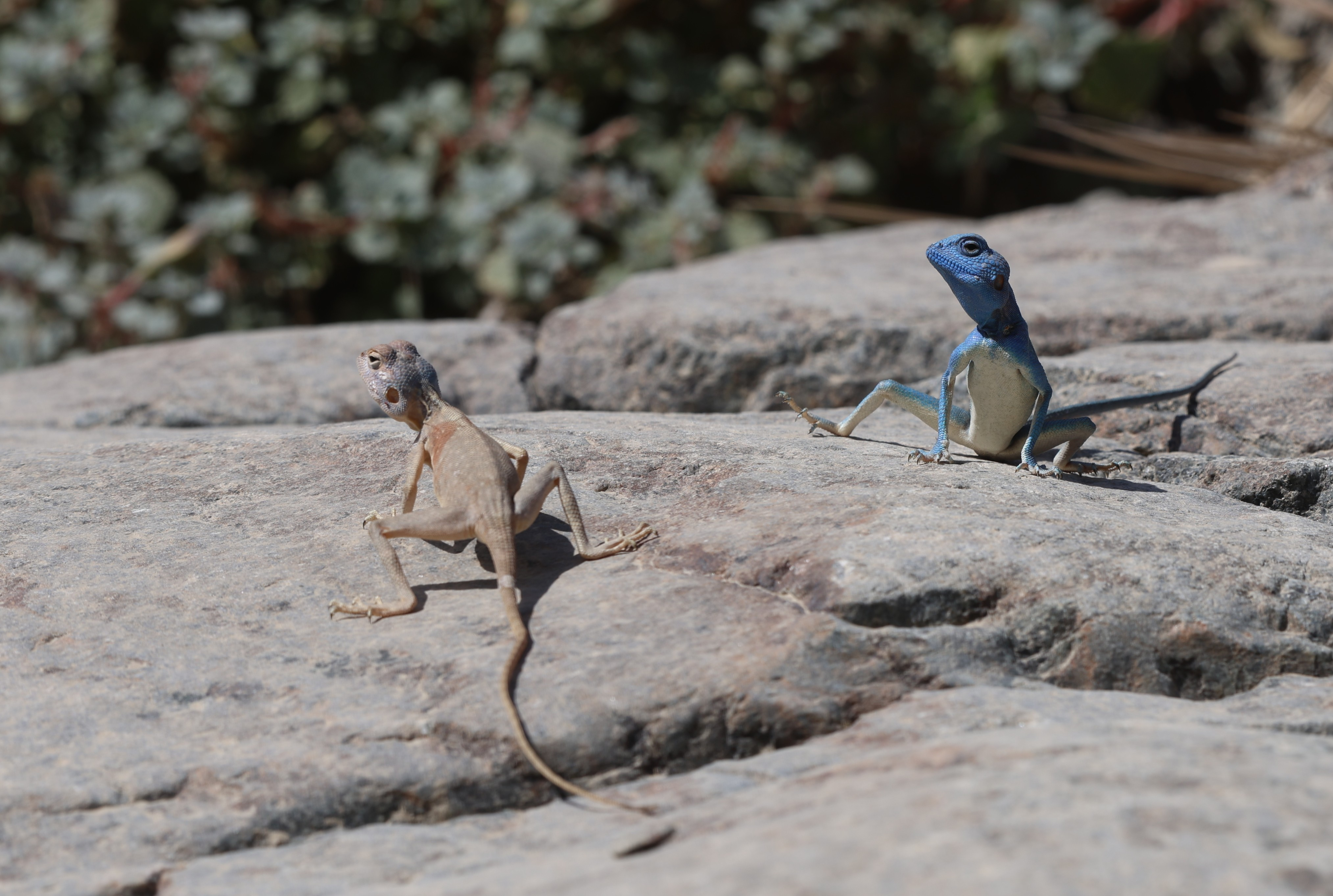
Pseudotrapelus jensvindumi male and female

This species is named in honor of Jens V. Vindum.
