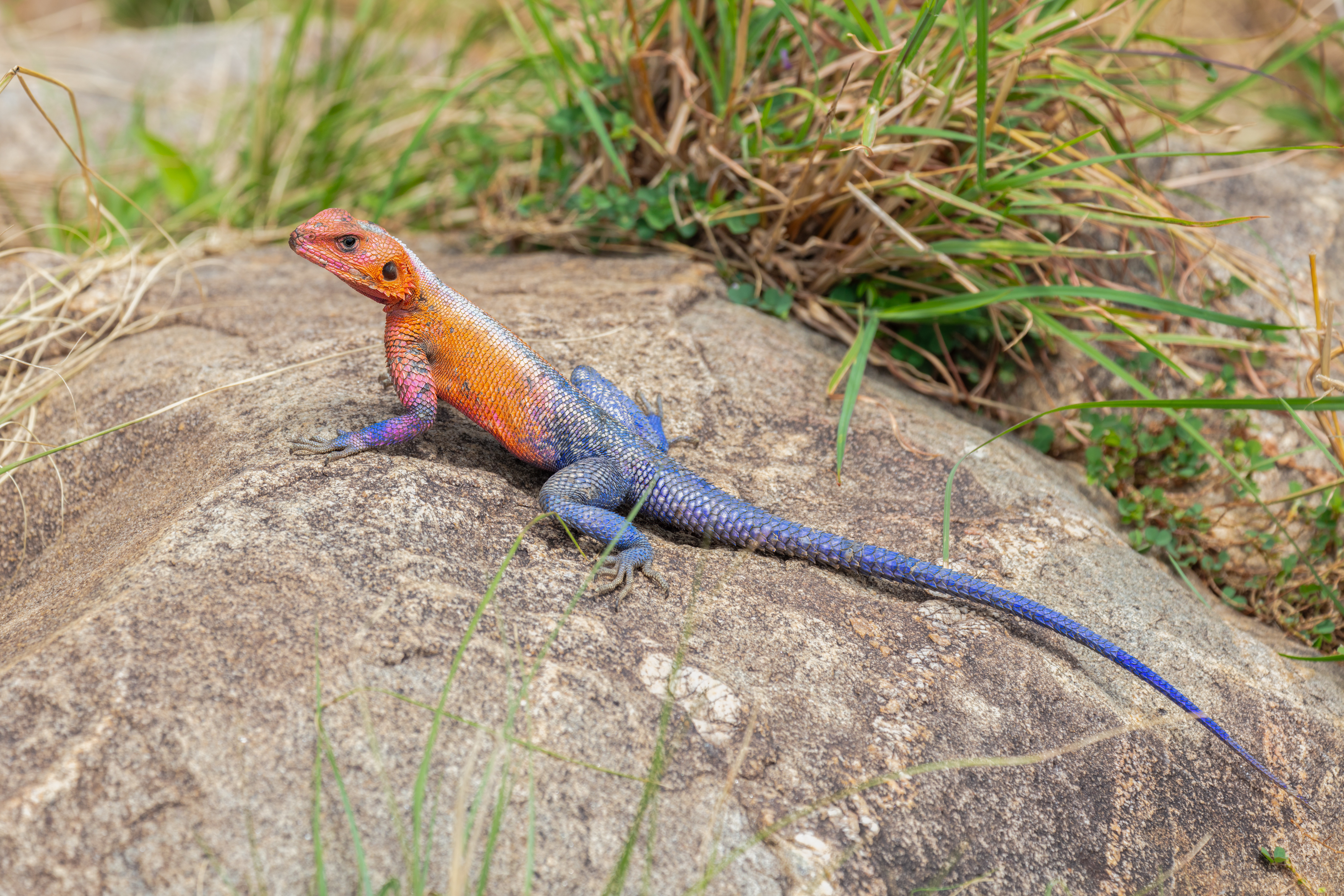
- Male, Masái Mara, Kenya
- Female, Serengeti National Park, Tanzania

Conservation status
- Least Concern (IUCN 3.1)

Scientific classification
- Kingdom: Animalia
- Phylum: Chordata
- Class: Reptilia
- Order: Squamata
- Suborder: Iguania
- Family: Agamidae
- Genus: Agama
- Species: A. mwanzae

Binomial name
- Agama mwanzae Loveridge, 1923
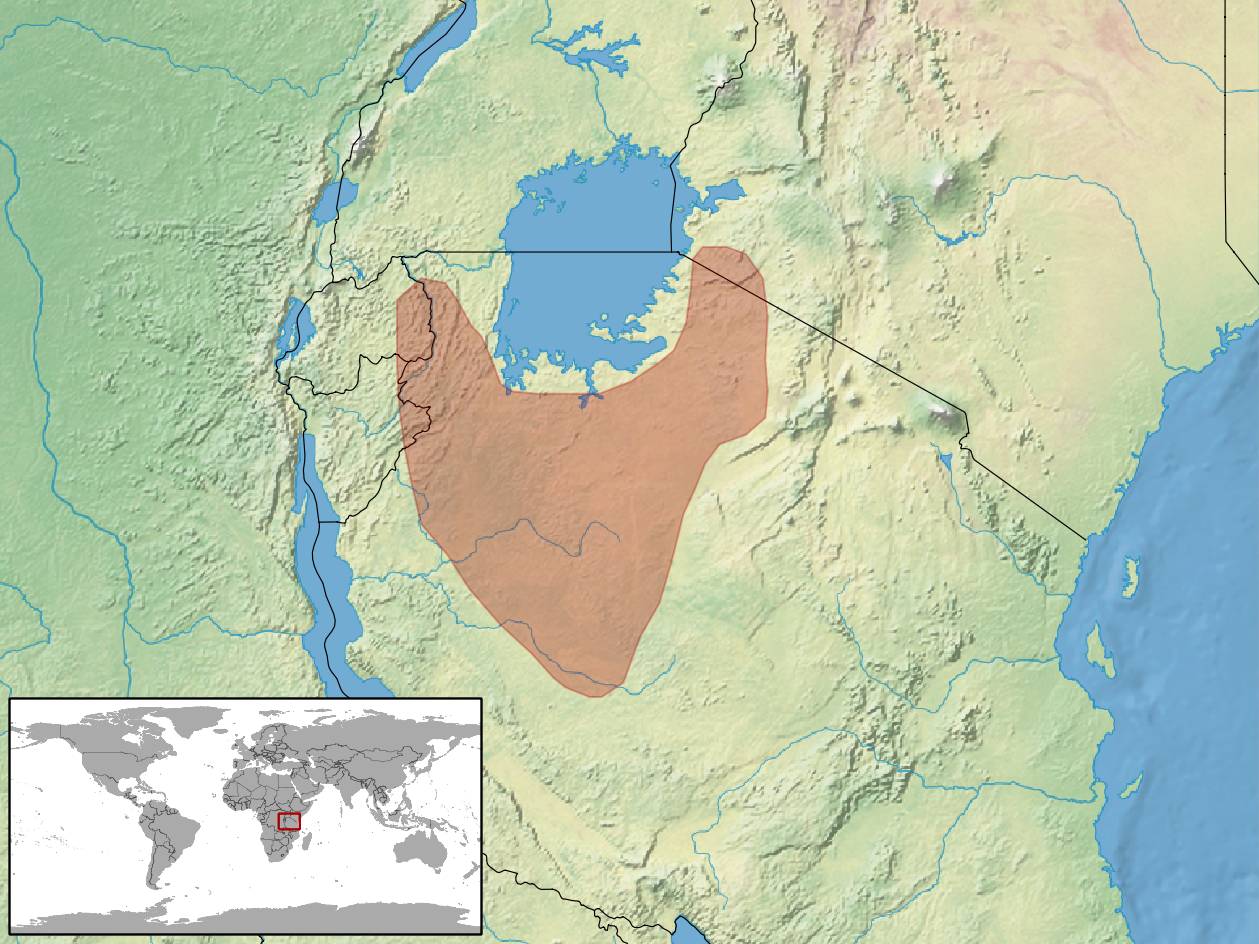

Synonyms
- Agama agama mwanzae Agama planiceps mwanzae

= Mwanza flat-headed rock agama =

Species of lizard

The Mwanza flat-headed rock agama (Agama mwanzae) is a lizard reptile in the family Agamidae, found in Tanzania, Rwanda, and Kenya.

It lives in semideserts and can often be seen in the heat of the day basking on rocks or kopjes. The male's head, neck, and shoulders are bright red or violet, while the body is dark blue. The female is mostly brown and is difficult to distinguish from female agamas of other species. This lizard is often confused with the red-headed rock agama (Agama agama). Males preferably have around five breeding partners and are highly territorial. Once a male has won over a female, the lizard performs exotic head bobs and head swinging to court her.

The species has become a fashionable pet due to the male's coloration, which resembles the comic-book superhero Spider-Man.

female with male and a juvenile on the male's back
