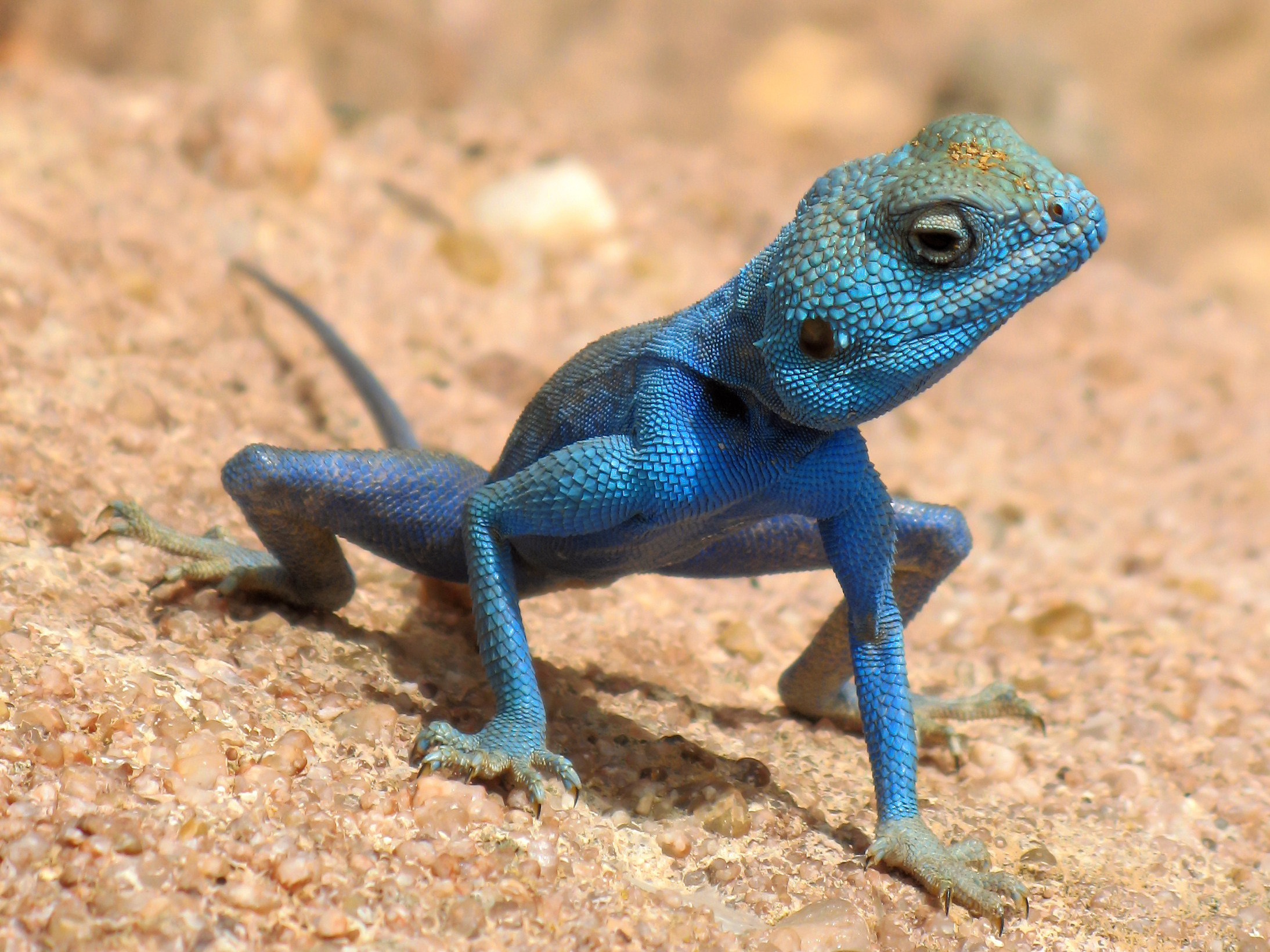
- Male
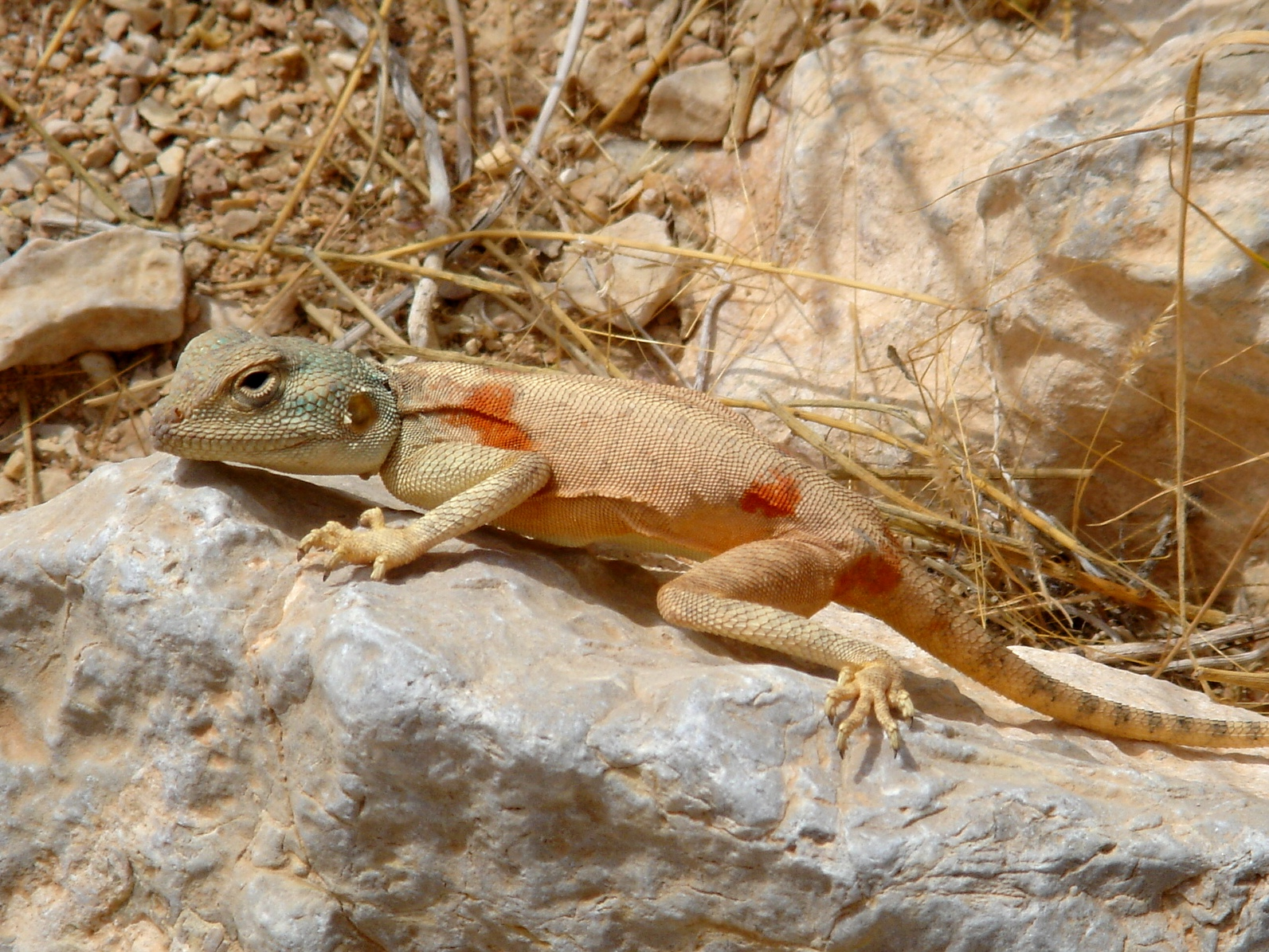
- Female

Conservation status
- Least Concern (IUCN 3.1)

Scientific classification
- Kingdom: Animalia
- Phylum: Chordata
- Class: Reptilia
- Order: Squamata
- Suborder: Iguania
- Family: Agamidae
- Genus: Pseudotrapelus
- Species: P. sinaitus

Binomial name
- Pseudotrapelus sinaitus (Heyden, 1827)

Synonyms
- Agama sinaita Heyden, 1827; Agama arenaria Heyden, 1827; Agama straminea Lichtenstein, 1845; Agama lichtensteini Gray, 1845; Agama sinaitica Rüppell, 1845; Trapelus sinaiticus — Tristram, 1888; Agama neumanni Tornier, 1905; Pseudotrapelus sinaita — Moody, 1980

= Sinai agama =

Species of reptile

The Sinai agama (Pseudotrapelus sinaitus) is an agamid lizard found in the Sinai Peninsula (Egypt), Israel, Jordan, Syria.

The length of the lizard including its long slender tail is 18 cm (7 in), the tail accounting for up to two-thirds of its total length. The limbs and tail are long and thin and allow for good climbing and running capability.

Pseudotrapelus sinaitus is active during daytime and feeds on insects and other arthropods and plants. During the breeding season, males become a striking blue colour to attract females. The female has brownish-red spots on her sides.

== Description ==
The Sinai agama is a small lizard with long legs, giving it an upright stance. It grows to a length of 18 cm (7 in) and has a long, slender tail, one and a half times as long as the body. The long head has the eyes fairly near the front with a distinctive pair of ear openings some way behind in line with the animal's mouth. The legs are long and slender and the tail is often held off the ground. This lizard is generally a dull brown colour, but during the breeding season, the male turns bright blue, or sometimes just the head and throat turn blue with the other parts remaining brown. Females and juveniles are greyish-brown all year round, but females often have a crescent-shaped red patch on each side just behind the forelimbs. The scales on the dorsal surface are relatively small, uniformly overlapping, and slightly keeled. The mid-back scales are slightly larger than elsewhere, and the scales on the tail are larger than those on the back. Unlike members of the closely related genus Agama, the third (middle) toe is the longest instead of the fourth.

== Distribution ==
The Sinai agama is found in arid parts of northeastern Africa and parts of the Middle East. The countries where it occurs in the Sinai peninsula (Egypt), , Israel, Jordan, and Syria.

== Behaviour ==
The Sinai agama hunts for insects and a large part of its diet consists of ants. Breeding takes place in spring and early summer when both the male and female become territorial. To maintain their territory, they adopt a threatening pose by raising their heads and gaping. The male finds a prominent spot where he can communicate with a prospective mate by bobbing his head, using eye movements, and doing push-ups with his front limbs. After mating has taken place, the female lays a clutch of five to nine eggs about 1.5 cm (0.6 in) long.

Like other lizards, the Sinai agama is ectothermic. In the daytime, they bask in the sun and are seen on boulders, cliffs, or piles of stone. Under these circumstances, any alarm or attempt at predation causes them to dash off at great speed. When the external temperature is lower, their body metabolism is lowered and they are incapable of sudden bursts of speed. Their instinct is to stand their ground and attack their aggressors.

== Subspecies ==
Two subspecies are recognized as being valid, including the nominotypical subspecies.

- Pseudotrapelus sinaitus sinaitus (Heyden, 1827)
- Pseudotrapelus sinaitus werneri (Moravec, 2002)

== Etymology ==
The subspecific name, werneri, is in honour of Israeli Herpetologist Yehudah L. Werner.

The specific name of the junior synonym, Agama neumanni, is in honor of German ornithologist Oscar Neumann.
