= Philipp Wagner =

German biologist and herpetologist

- Born: Philipp Rüdiger Wagner; 29 November 1973 (age 52); Hilden, Germany
- Education: University of Bonn
- Known for: Research on African and Asian agamid lizards
- Scientific career
- Fields: Herpetology, Biology
- Workplaces: Zoological Research Museum Alexander Koenig, Villanova University, Allwetterzoo Münster
- Author abbrev. (zoology): Wagner
- Website: philippwagner.net

Philipp Rüdiger Wagner (born 29 November 1973) is a German biologist and herpetologist. He was trained at the Zoological Research Museum Alexander Koenig in Bonn and received his doctorate there, as well as at the University of Bonn. After a postdoctoral position at Villanova University in Pennsylvania, United States, he returned to the Museum Koenig for another postdoctoral appointment. Until mid-2017, he was head of the Upper Franconia district office and the UIZ Lindenhof Natural History Museum of the Landesbund für Vogelschutz in Bayern (LBV) near Bayreuth. Since July 2017, he has served as curator for research and species conservation at the Allwetterzoo Münster.

== Biography ==
=== Early life and education ===
Wagner graduated from the Otto-Hahn-Gymnasium in Monheim am Rhein with a focus on mathematics and natural sciences and completed his alternative civilian service at the Urdenbacher Kämpe Biological Station in Monheim. From 1995 to 2004, he studied biology at the University of Bonn, graduating with a diploma. His diploma thesis dealt with the systematics and zoogeography of the reptile fauna of the Kakamega Forest National Reserve in Kenya. He then began his doctoral studies under Wolfgang Böhme at the Zoological Research Museum Alexander Koenig. In 2003, he contributed to the design and construction of the ornithological display collection in the permanent exhibition Unser blauer Planet ("Our Blue Planet").

Since 2011, Wagner has also been a research associate at Villanova University, Pennsylvania, and was a visiting professor of zoology at the University of Herat in Afghanistan in late 2011.

=== Career and research ===
Wagner has published in journals such as Nature, Nature Communications, and Science, as well as in specialized herpetological literature. He serves as an editor for the journals Salamandra, Herpetology Notes, Tropical Zoology, Herpetozoa, and Mertensiella. His research focuses primarily on the northwestern regions of Zambia, where he documented the composition of amphibian and reptile species. He is a principal investigator in the project “ZamBio, Diversity of Amphibians and Reptiles in the Luangwa Valley”, in collaboration with the Zambian Wildlife Authority, the University of Zambia, and the Livingstone Museum. Wagner’s work also addresses the taxonomy of agamas and the herpetogeography of African forests. He is co-author of several species descriptions, including Cerastes boehmei, Gloydius rickmersi, and Cardioglossa occidentalis, as well as numerous agamid lizards. Another field of interest is fossil lizards preserved in amber.

He is regarded as an internationally recognized expert on African, Arabian, and Central Asian agamid lizards.

== Species described ==
Wagner is (co-)author of numerous taxa, including:

- Agama finchi (Böhme, Wagner, Malonza, Lötters & Köhler, 2005)
- Trapelus schmitzi (Wagner & Böhme, 2007)
- Cardioglossa occidentalis (Blackburn et al., 2008)
- Cerastes boehmei (Wagner & Wilms, 2010)
- Agama lucyae (Wagner & Bauer, 2011)
- Acanthocercus branchi (Wagner, Greenbaum & Bauer, 2012)
- Xenagama wilmsi (Wagner, Mazuch & Bauer, 2013)
- Agama lanzai (Wagner, Leaché, Mazuch & Böhme, 2013)
- Gloydius rickmersi (Wagner, Tiutenko, Borkin & Simonov, 2016)
- Protodraco monocoli (Wagner, Stanley, Daza & Bauer, 2021)
- and many others.

== Eponyms ==
- Tetramorium philippwagneri (Hita-Garcia et al., 2010)

== Selected publications ==
- Wagner, P., Broadley, D. G., & Bauer, A. M. (2012). "A New Acontine Skink from Zambia (Scincidae: Acontias Cuvier, 1817)." Journal of Herpetology, 46: 494–502.
- Blackburn, D. C. et al. (2008). "A New Species of Cardioglossa (Anura: Arthroleptidae) from the Upper Guinean Forests of West Africa." Copeia 3: 603–612.
- Wagner, P., Köhler, J., Schmitz, A., & Böhme, W. (2008). "The Biogeographical Assignment of a West Kenyan Rain Forest Remnant: Further Evidence From Analysis of Its Reptile Fauna." Journal of Biogeography, 35: 1349–1361.
- Wagner, P., Melville, J., Wilms, T. M., & Schmitz, A. (2011). "Opening a box of cryptic taxa? A review of the morphology and current taxonomy of the lizard genus Trapelus in northern Africa and description of a new species." Zoological Journal of the Linnean Society, 163: 884–912.
- Wagner, P. & Bauer, A. M. (2011). "A new dwarf Agama (Sauria: Agamidae) from Ethiopia." Breviora, 527: 1–19.
- Wagner, P., Leaché, A. D. & Fujita, M. K. (2014). "Description of four new West African forest geckos of the Hemidactylus fasciatus complex, revealed by coalescent species delimitation." Bonn zoological Bulletin, 63: 1–14.
