= List of reptiles and amphibians of the Andaman and Nicobar Islands =

This article lists the species of reptiles and amphibians found in the Andaman and Nicobar Islands. Over 100 species of herpetofauna are found in the island, out of which many are endemic. This list uses British English throughout.

== Amphibians ==
A total of 20 species of amphibian have been sighted in the islands.

=== Fork-tongued frogs ===
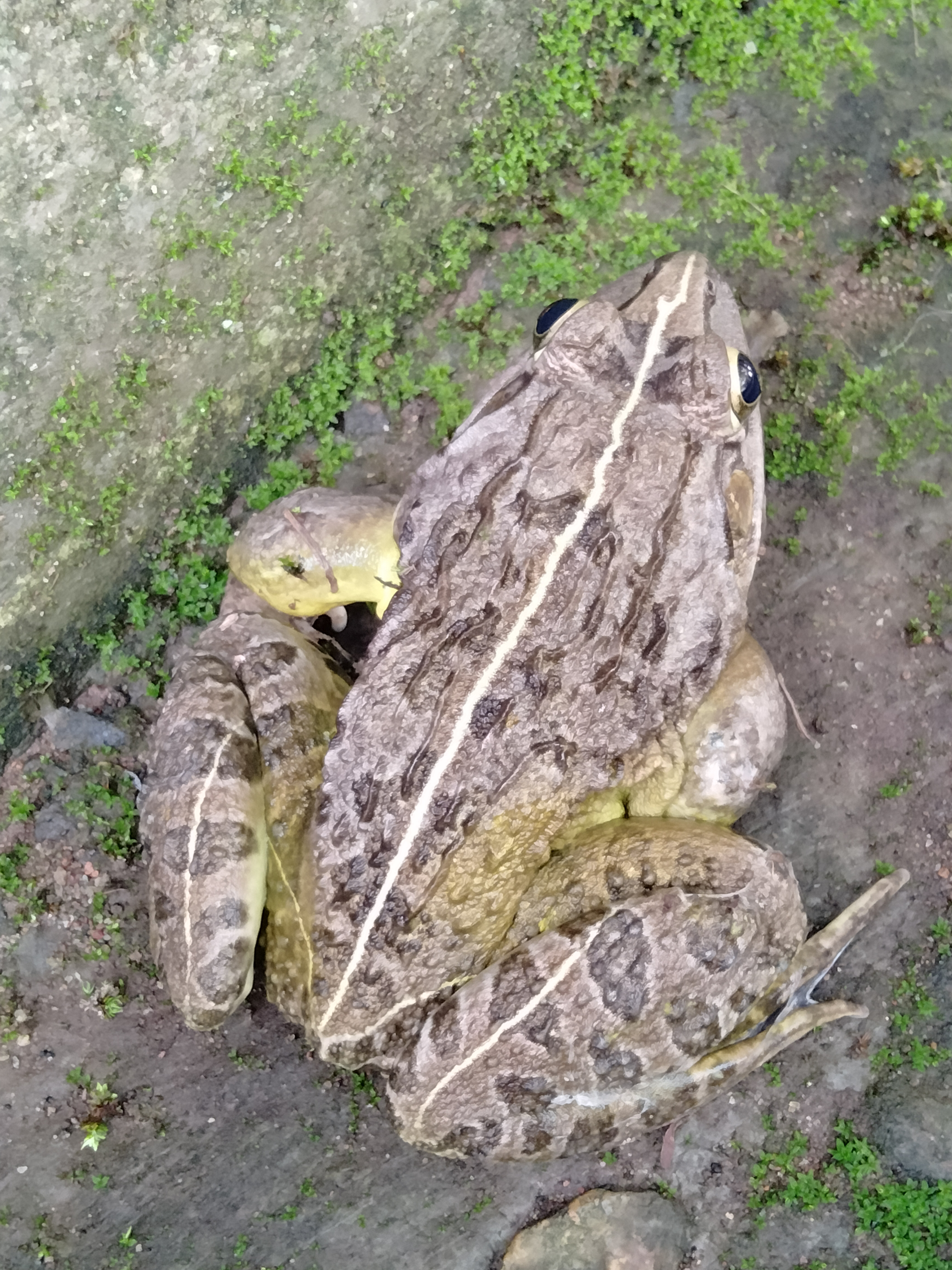
Indus Valley bullfrog

Family: Dicroglossidae

Common name	Binomial	Endemic	IUCN Status	Comments
Andaman frog	Minervarya andamanensis	Yes	LC	
Mangrove frog	Fejervarya moodiei	No	LC	
Nicobar frog	Minervarya nicobariensis	Yes	EN	
Hill forest frog	Limnonectes hascheanus	No	LC	presence yet to be confirmed
Charles Darwin's eastern frog	Minervarya charlesdarwini	Yes	CR	
Red stream frog	Limnonectes doriae	No	LC	
Indus Valley bullfrog	Hoplobatrachus tigerinus	No	LC	
Shompen frog	Limnonectes shompenorum	No	LC	

=== Narrow-mouthed frogs ===
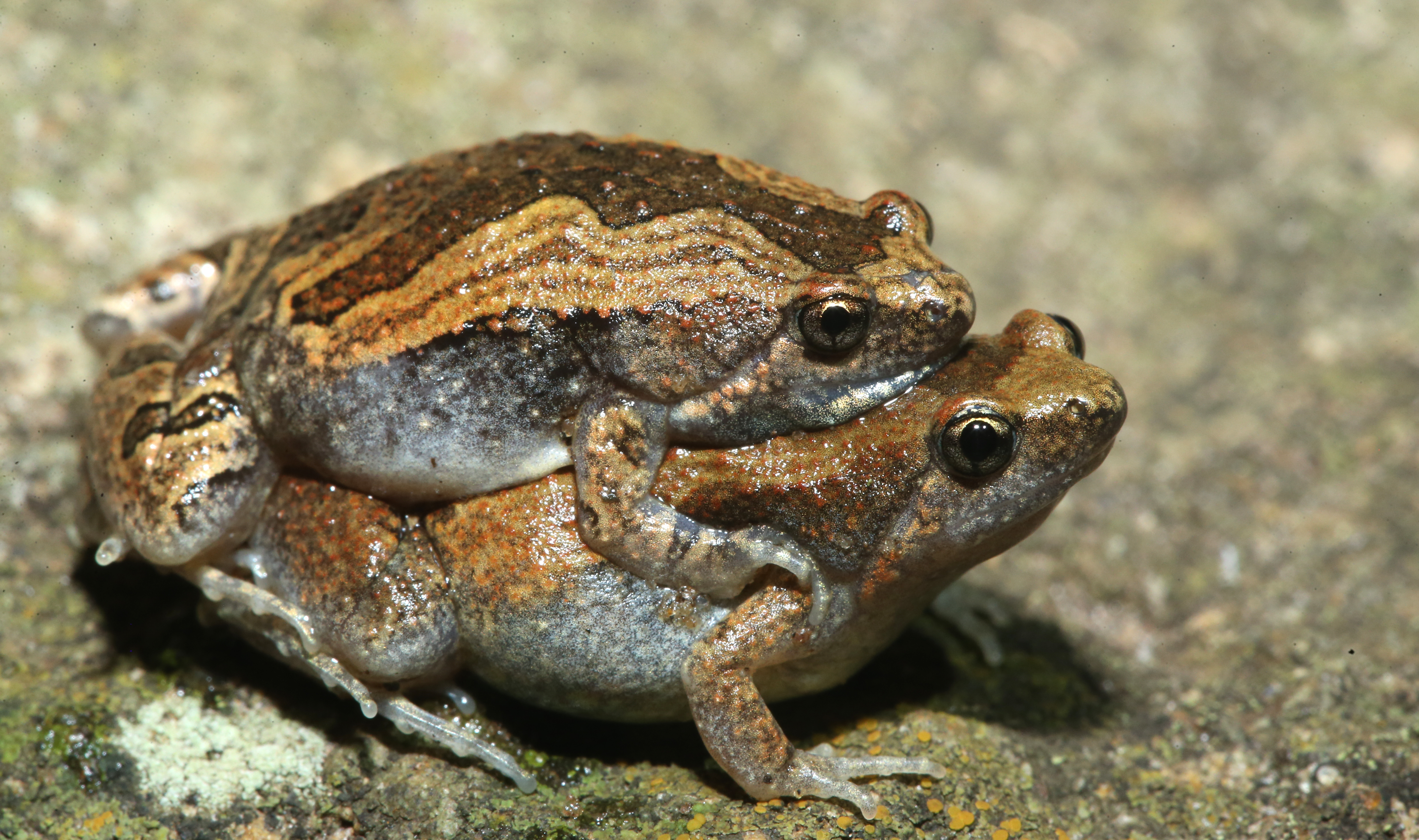
Ornate narrow-mouthed frog

Family: Microhylidae

Common name	Binomial	Endemic	IUCN Staus	Comments
Andaman bullfrog	Kaloula ghoshi	No	NE	
Mayabunder rice frog	Microhyla chakrapanii	Yes	DD	
Ornate narrow-mouthed frog	Microhyla ornata	No	LC	
Deli little pygmy frog	Micryletta inornata	No	LC	
	Microhyla nakkavaram	Yes	NE	

=== True toads ===
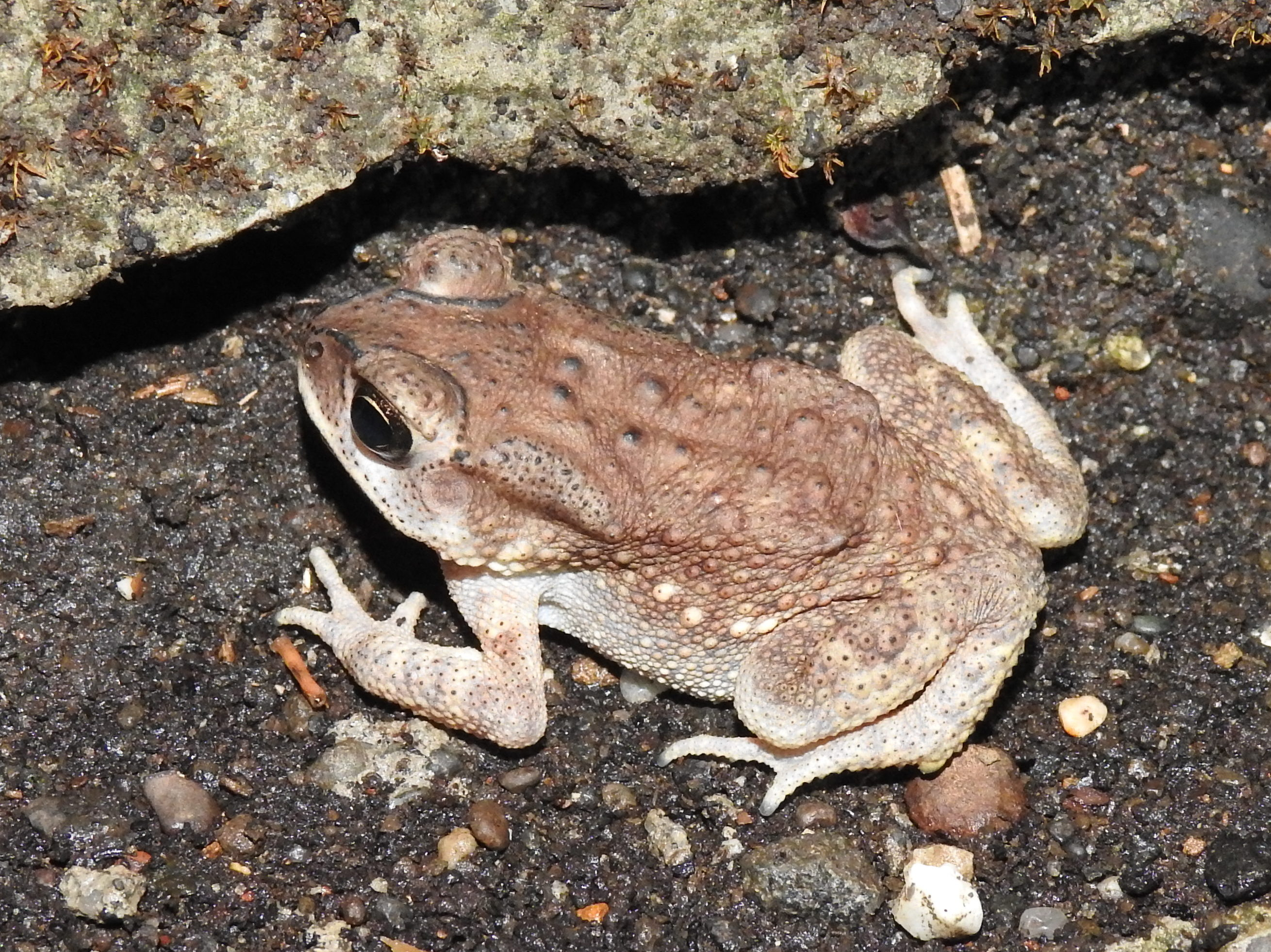
Asian common toad

Family: Bufonidae

Common name	Binomial	Endemic	IUCN Status	Comments
Asian common toad	Duttaphrynus melanostictus	No	LC	
Andaman bush toad	Blythophryne beryet	Yes	NE	

=== True frogs ===
Family: Ranidae

Common name	Binomial	Endemic	IUCN Status	Comments
Schlegel's frog	Chalcorana chalconota	No	LC	
Green paddy frog	Hylarana erythraea	No	LC	
Nicobarese frog	Hylarana nicobariensis	No	LC	

=== Shrub frogs ===
Family: Rhacophoridae

Common name	Binomial	Endemic	IUCN Status	Comments
Nicobarese treefrog	Polypedates insularis	Yes	NT	
Two-striped bubble-nest frog	Rohanixalus vittatus	No	LC	

== Reptiles ==
About 80 species are found in the islands.

=== Crocodiles ===
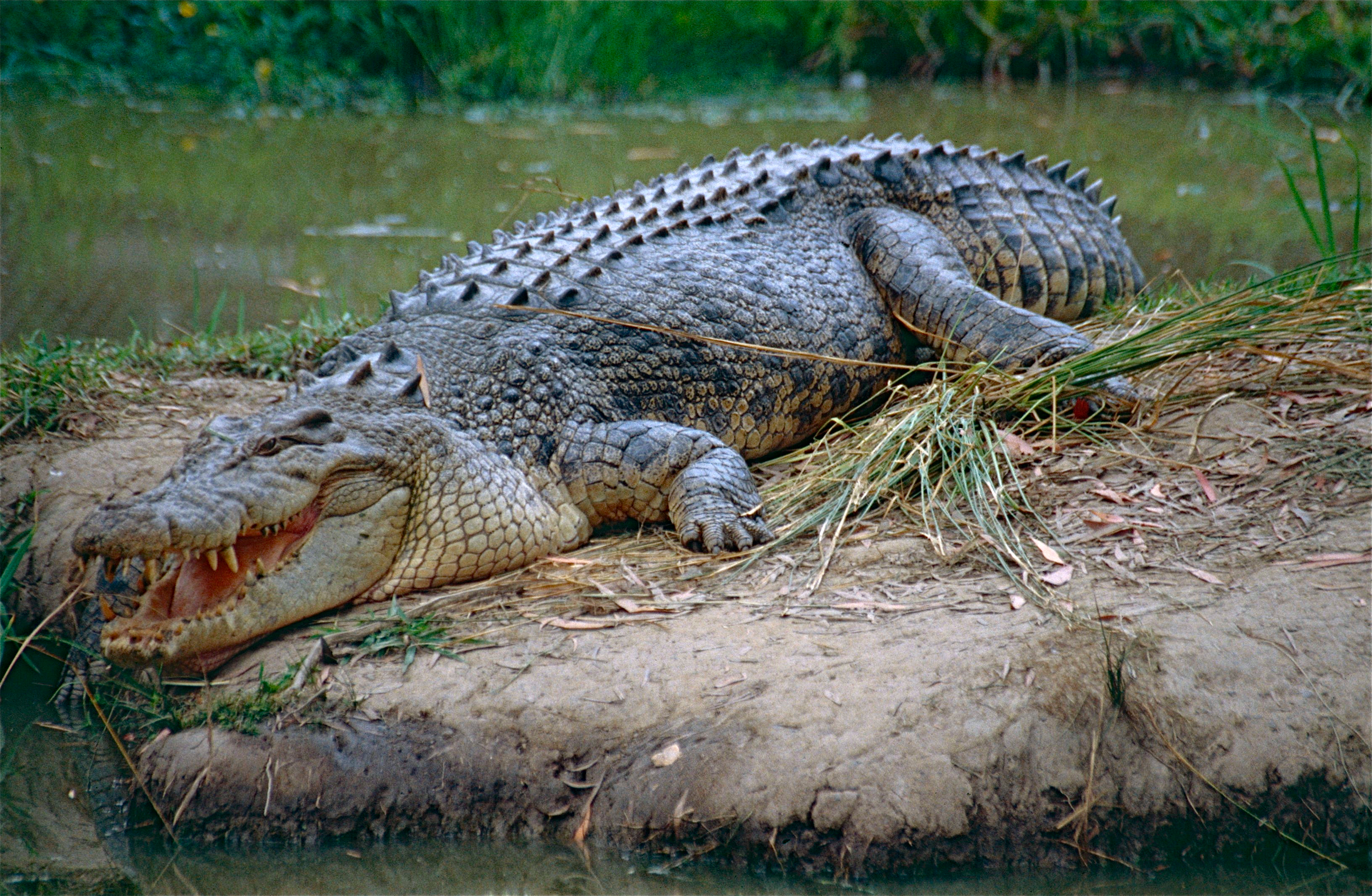
Saltwater crocodile

Family: Crocodylidae

Common name	Binomial	Endemic	IUCN Status	Comments
Saltwater crocodile	Crocodylus porosus	No	LC	

=== Leatherback sea turtle ===
Family: Dermochelyidae

Common name	Binomial	Endemic	IUCN Status	Comments
Leatherback sea turtle	Dermochelys coriacea	No	VU	

=== Typical sea turtles ===
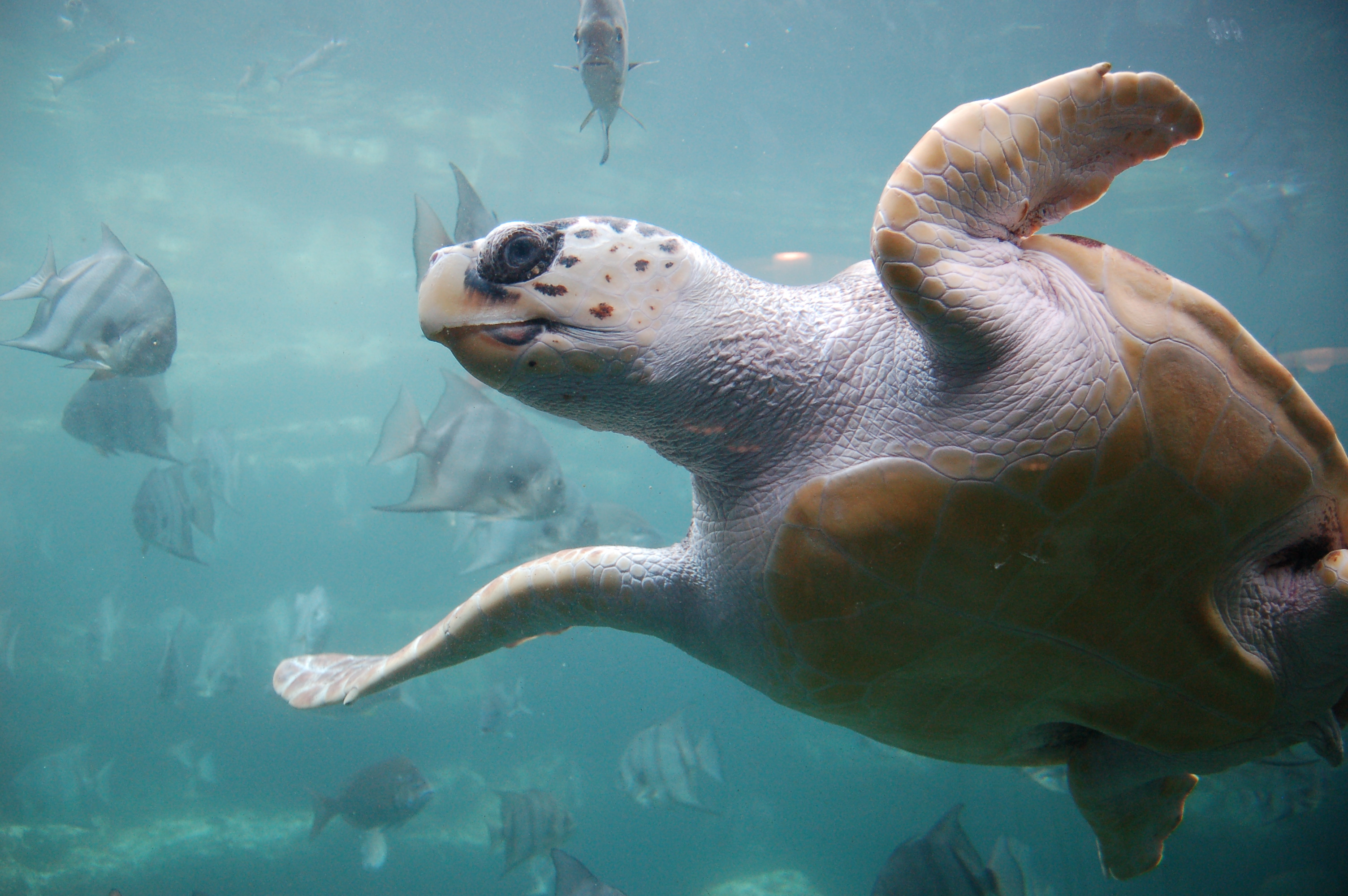
Loggerhead sea turtle

Family: Cheloniidae

Common name	Binomial	Endemic	IUCN Status	Comments
Loggerhead sea turtle	Caretta caretta	No	VU	
Green sea turtle	Chelonia mydas	No	EN	
Hawksbill sea turtle	Eretmochelys imbricata	No	CR	
Olive ridley sea turtle	Lepidochelys olivacea	No	VU	

=== River turtles ===
Family: Geoemydidae

Common name	Binomial	Endemic	IUCN Status	Comments
Amboina box turtle	Cuora amboinensis	No	VU	

=== Softshell and flapshell turtles ===
Family: Trionychidae

Common name	Binomial	Endemic	IUCN Status	Comments
Indian flapshell turtle	Lissemys punctata	No	LC	

=== True geckos ===
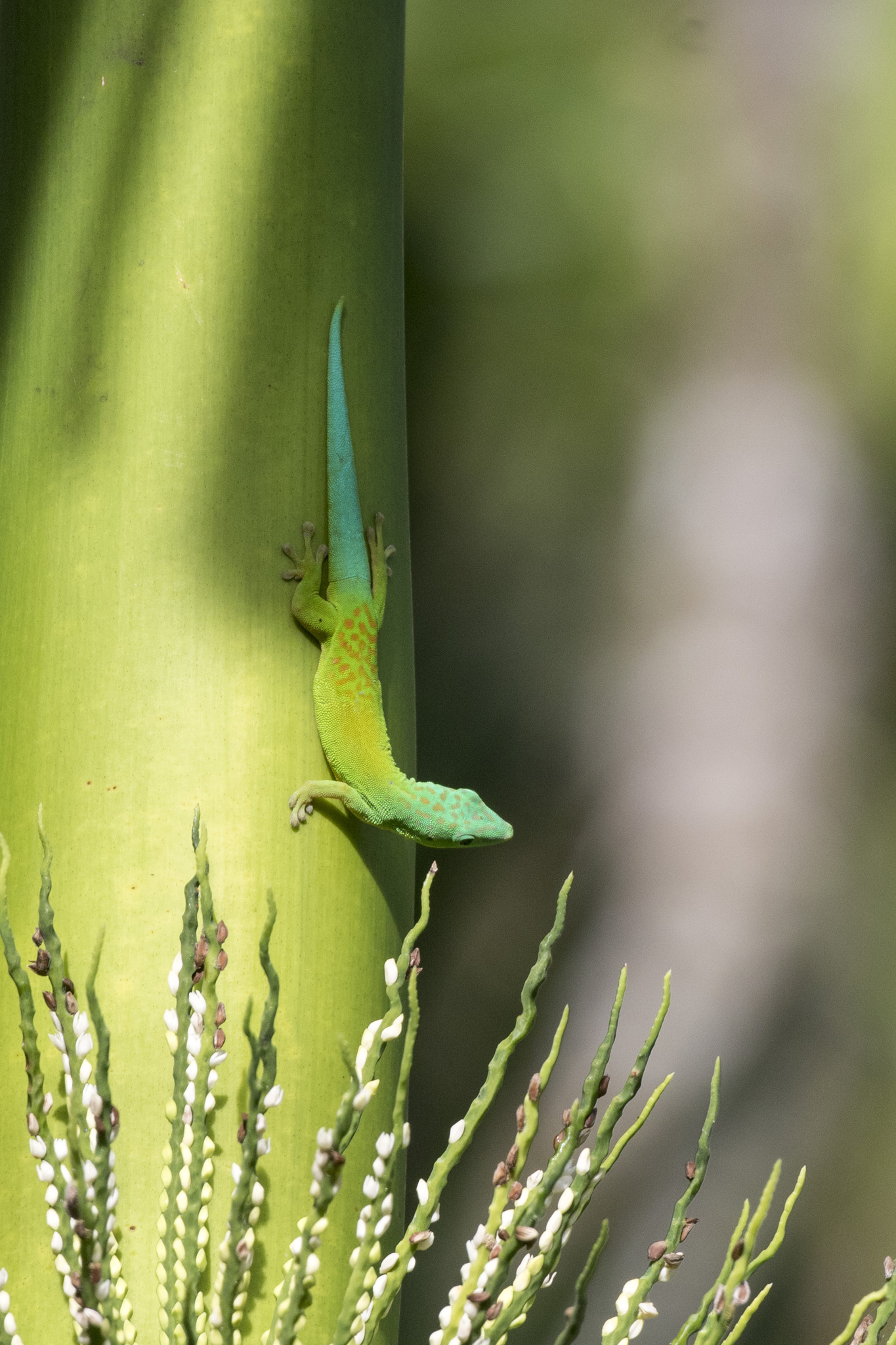
Andaman day gecko

Family: Gekkonidae

Common name	Binomial	Endemic	IUCN Status	Comments
Andaman day gecko	Phelsuma andamanensis	Yes	LC	
Common four-clawed gecko	Gehyra mutilata	No	NE	
Andaman giant gecko	Gekko verreauxi	Yes	VU	
Smith's green-eyed gecko	Gekko smithii	No	LC	
Makachua gecko	Gekko stoliczkai	Yes	NE	
Andaman bent-toed gecko	Cyrtodactylus rubidus	No	VU	
Nicobar bent-toed gecko	Cyrtodactylus adleri	Yes	LC	
Central Nicobar bent-toed gecko	Cyrtodactylus camortensis	Yes	NE	
Northern Nicobar bent-toed gecko	Cyrtodactylus nicobaricus	Yes	NE	
Indo-pacific slender gecko	Hemiphyllodactylus typus	No	LC	
Kandy day gecko	Cnemaspis andersonii	No	LC	
Nicobar rock gecko	Cnemaspis nicobaricus	Yes	NE	
Oriental worm gecko	Hemiphyllodactylus typus	No	LC	
Mourning gecko	Lepidodactylus lugubris	No	NE	
Nicobar gliding gecko	Gekko nicobarensis	Yes	NE	
Common house gecko	Hemidactylus frenatus	No	LC	
Spotted house gecko	Hemidactylus parvimaculatus	No	NE	
Brook's house gecko	Hemidactylus brookii	No	NE	
Indo-Pacific gecko	Hemidactylus garnotii	No	NE	
Flat-tailed house gecko	Hemidactylus platyurus	No	NE	

=== Agamas ===
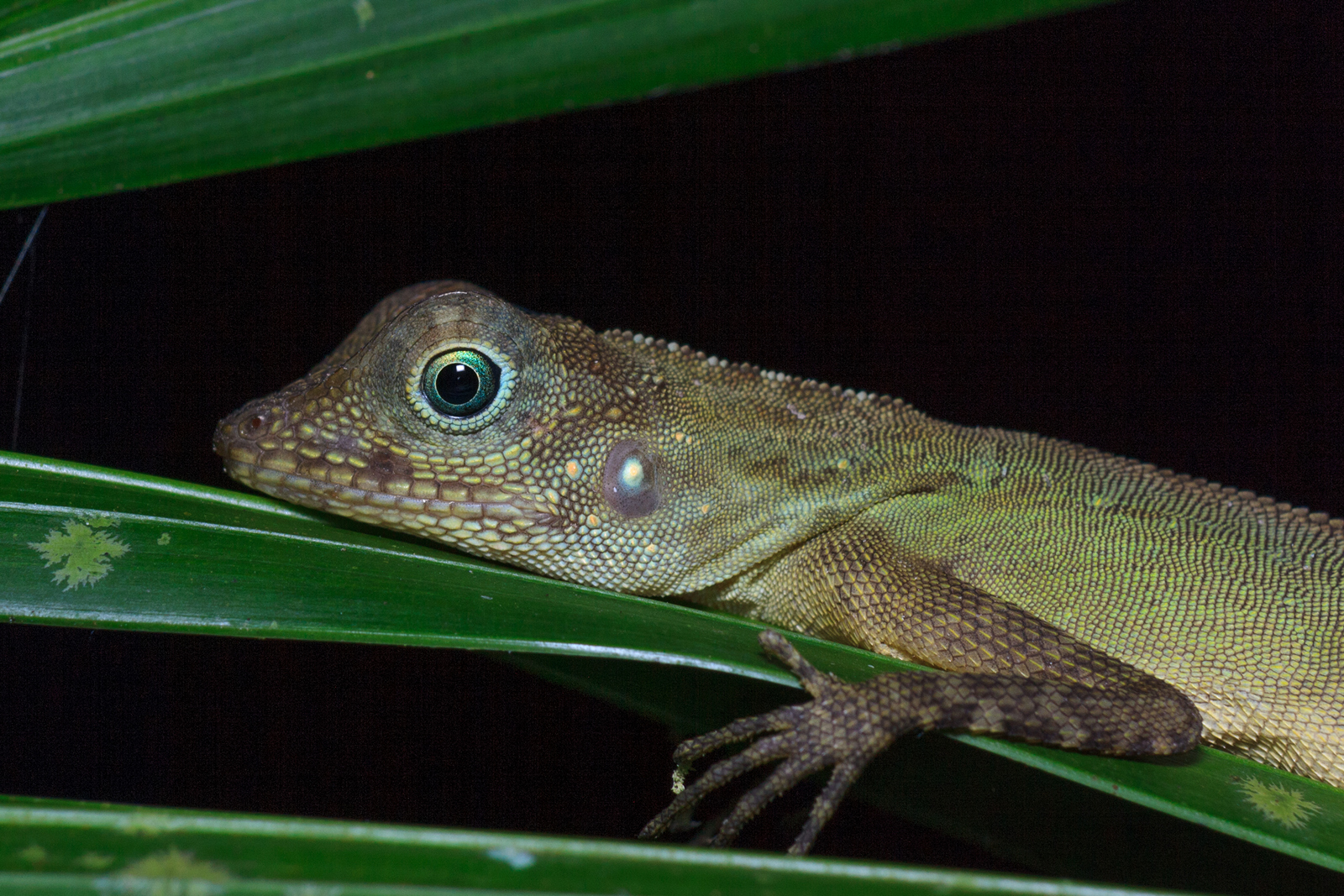
Short-crested bay island forest lizard

Family: Agamidae

Common name	Binomial	Endemic	IUCN Status	Comments
Short-crested bay island forest lizard	Coryphophylax subcristatus	Yes	LC	
Short-tailed bay island forest lizard	Coryphophylax brevicauda	Yes	NE	
Oriental garden lizard	Calotes versicolor	No	NE	
Andaman canopy agama	Pseudocalotes andamanensis	Yes	NE	
Daniel's forest lizard	Bronchocela danieli	Yes	NE	
Green-crested lizard	Bronchocela cristatella	No	NE	
Camorta canopy agama	Bronchocela rubrigularis	Yes	NE	

=== Skinks ===
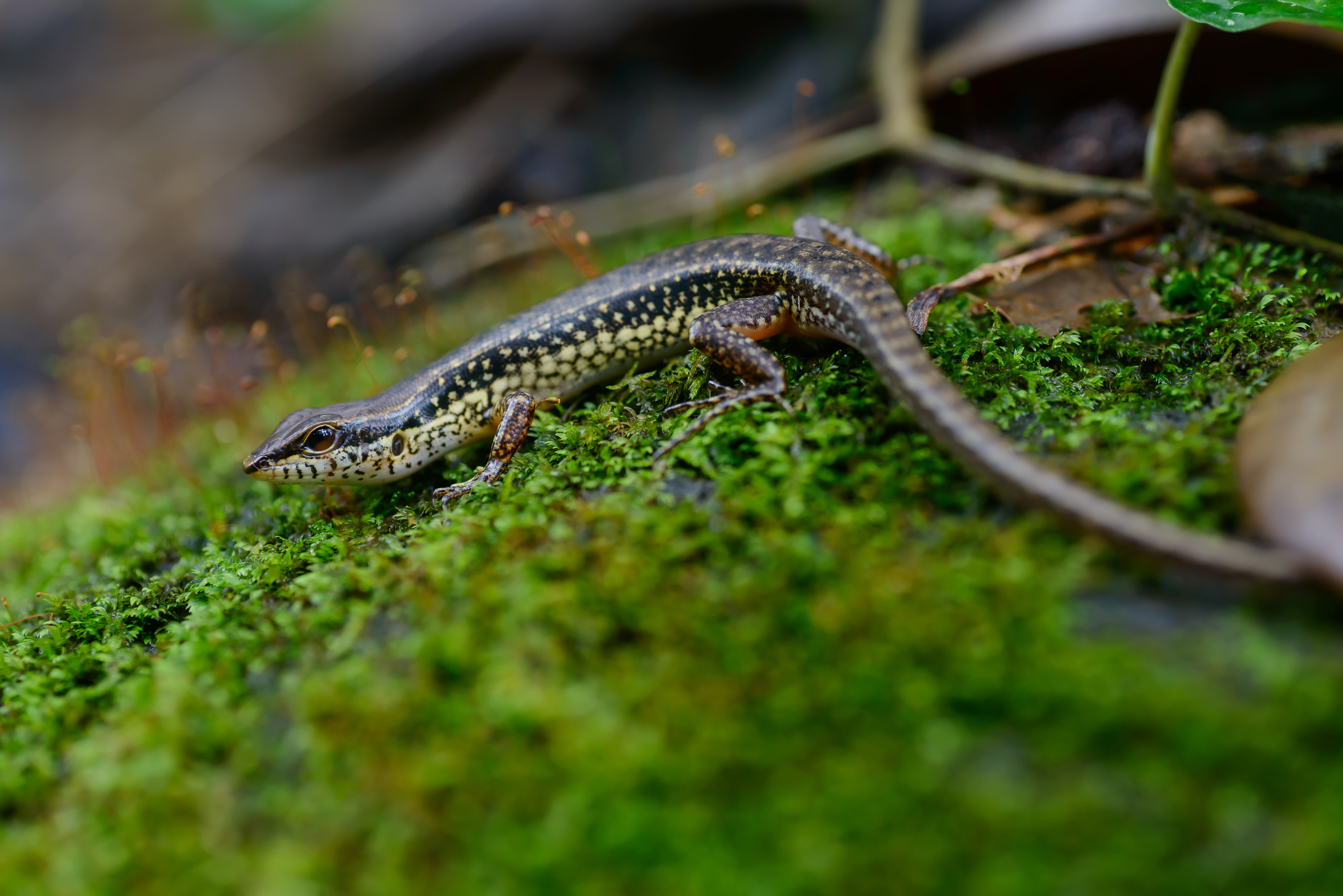
Spotted forest skink

Family: Scincidae

Common name	Binomial	Endemic	IUCN Status	Comments
Nicobar tree skink	Dasia nicobarensis	Yes	NE	
Olive tree skink	Dasia olivacea	No	LC	
Big-eared lipinia	Lipinia macrotympanum	Yes	VU	
Christmas Island grass-skink	Subdoluseps bowringii	No	NE	
Andaman Islands grass skink	Eutropis andamanensis	Yes	NE	
Tytler's mabuya	Eutropis tytleri	Yes	NE	
Rough mabuya	Eutropis rudis	No	NE	
Rough-scaled sun skink	Eutropis rugifera	No	NE	
Common sun skink	Eutropis multifasciata	No	NE	
Nicobar sun skink	Eutropis dattaroyi	Yes	NE	
Spotted forest skink	Sphenomorphus maculatus	No	NE	
Large-eared ground skink	Scincella macrotis	Yes	VU	

=== Worm-lizards ===
Family: Dibamidae

Common name	Binomial	Endemic	IUCN Status	Comments
Nicobar blind skink	Dibamus nicobaricum	Yes	NE	

=== Monitor lizards ===
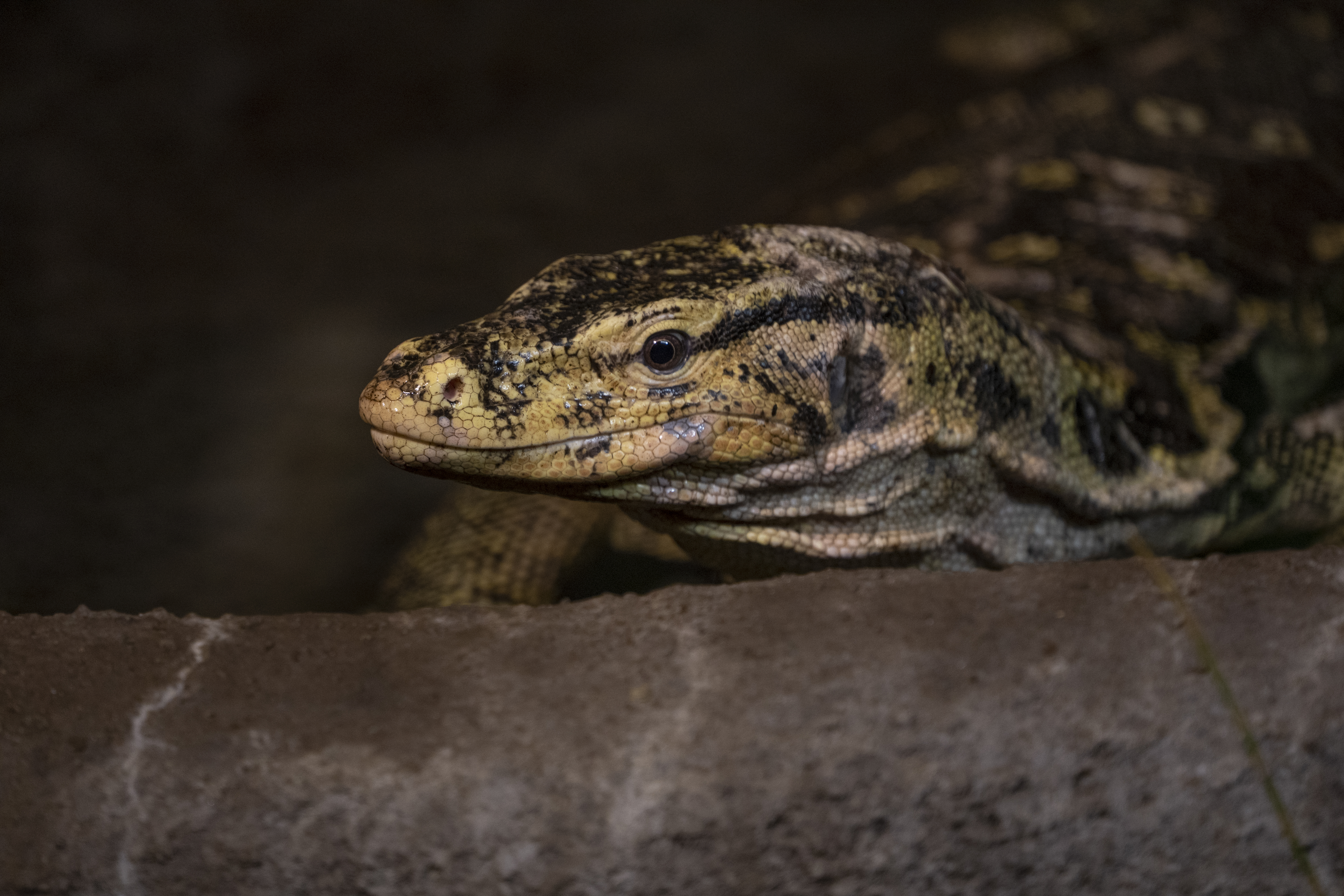
Asian water monitor

Family: Varanidae

Common name	Binomial	Endemic	IUCN Status	Comments
Asian water monitor	Varanus salvator	No	LC	

=== Blind snakes ===
Family: Typhlopidae

Common name	Binomial	Endemic	IUCN Status	Comments
Brahminy blind snake	Indotyphlops braminus	No	NE	
Andaman worm snake	Gerrhopilus andamanensis	Yes	DD	
Oates' worm snake	Argyrophis oatesii	No	DD	

=== File snakes ===
Family: Achrochordidae

Common name	Binomial	Endemic	IUCN Status	Comments
Little file snake	Acrochordus granulatus	No	LC	

=== Sun snakes ===
Family: Xenopeltidae

Common name	Binomial	Endemic	IUCN Status	Comments
Sunbeam snake	Xenopeltis unicolor	No	LC	

=== Pythons ===
Family: Pythonidae

Common name	Binomial	Endemic	IUCN Status	Comments
Reticulated python	Malayopython reticulatus	No	NE	

=== Keelbacks ===
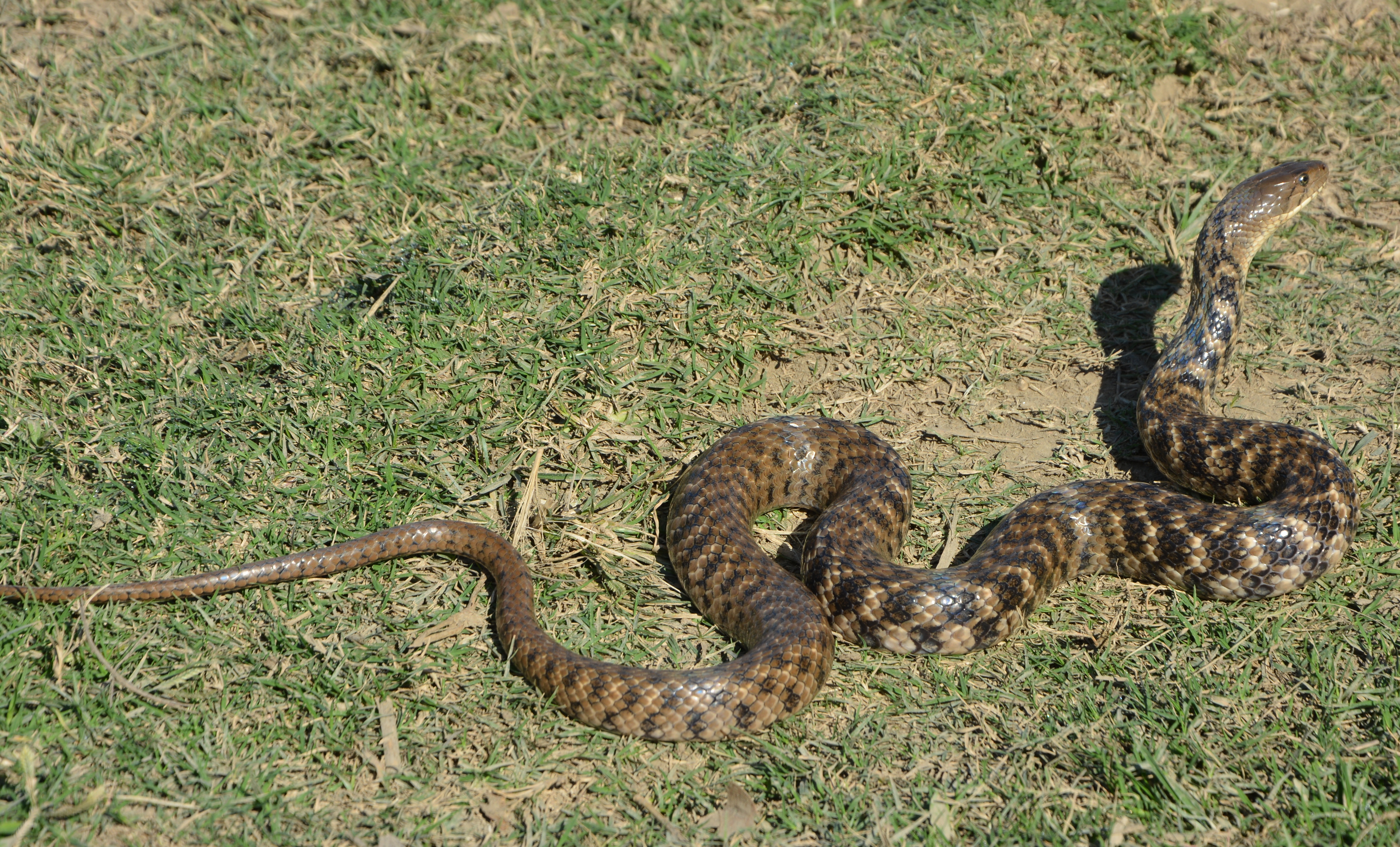
Checkered keelback

Family: Natricinae

Common name	Binomial	Endemic	IUCN Status	Comments
Checkered keelback	Fowlea piscator	No	NE	
Nicobar keelback	Thamnopis saurita	Yes	NE	
Triangle keelback	Xenochrophis trianguligerus	No	LC	

=== Colubrid snakes ===
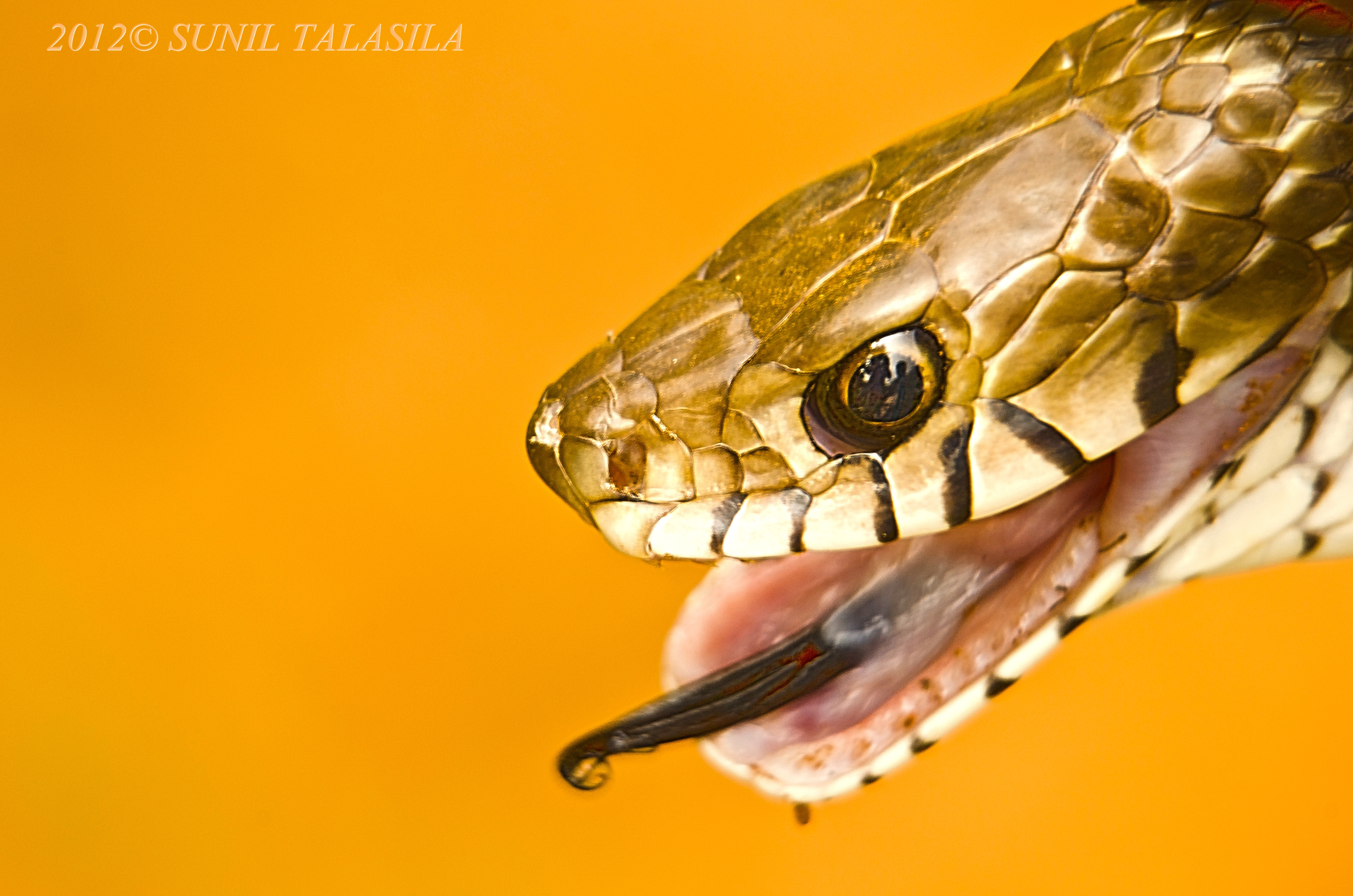
Indian rat snake

Family: Colubridae

Common name	Binomial	Endemic	IUCN Status	Comments
Andaman cat snake	Boiga andamanensis	Yes	NE	
Nicobar cat snake	Boiga wallachi	Yes	DD	
Paradise flying snake	Chrysopelea paradisi	No	LC	
Andaman bronzeback	Dendrelaphis andamanensis	Yes	NE	
Nicobar bronzeback	Dendrelaphis humayuni	Yes	NE	
Black-tailed trinket snake	Coelognathus flavolineatus	No	LC	
Red-tailed trinket snake	Gonyosoma oxycephalum	No	LC	
Andaman wolf snake	Lycodon hypsirhinoides	Yes	NE	
Irwin's wolf snake	Lycodon irwini	Yes	DD	
Malayan wolf snake	Lycodon subcinctus	No	LC	
Tiwari's wolf snake	Lycodon tiwarii	Yes	NE	
Yellow-striped kukri snake	Oligodon woodmasoni	Yes	NE	
Indian rat snake	Ptyas mucosa	No	NE	
Günther’s many-tooth snake	Sibynophis bistrigatus	No	DD	
Nicobar stripe-necked snake	Gongylosoma nicobarensis	Yes	NE	

=== Mangrove snakes ===
Family: Homalopsidae

Common name	Binomial	Endemic	IUCN Status	Comments
Yellow-banded mangrove snake	Cantoria violacea	No	LC	
Dog-faced water snake	Cerberus rynchops	No	LC	
Plumbeous smooth-scaled water snake	Hypsiscopus plumbea	No	LC	

=== Venomous snakes ===
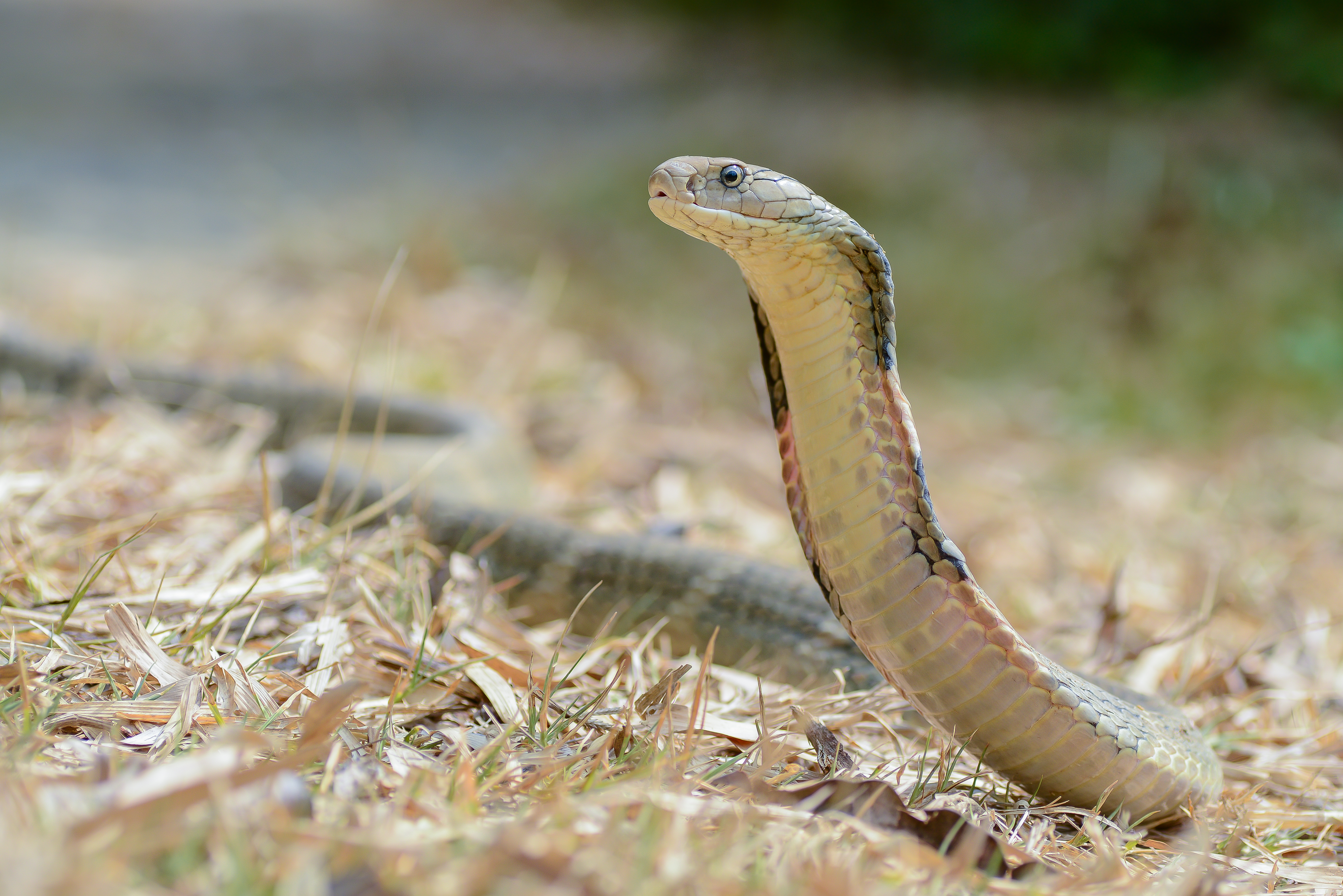
King cobra

Family: Elapidae

Common name	Binomial	Endemic	IUCN Status	Comments
Andaman krait	Bungarus andamanensis	Yes	VU	
Andaman cobra	Naja sagittifera	Yes	NE	
King cobra	Ophiophagus hannah	No	VU	
Yellow-lipped sea krait	Laticauda colubrina	No	LC	
Brown-lipped sea krait	Laticauda laticaudata	No	LC	
Cantor's narrow-headed sea krait	Hydrophis cantoris	No	DD	
Black-and-yellow sea snake	Hydrophis platurus	No	LC	

=== Vipers ===
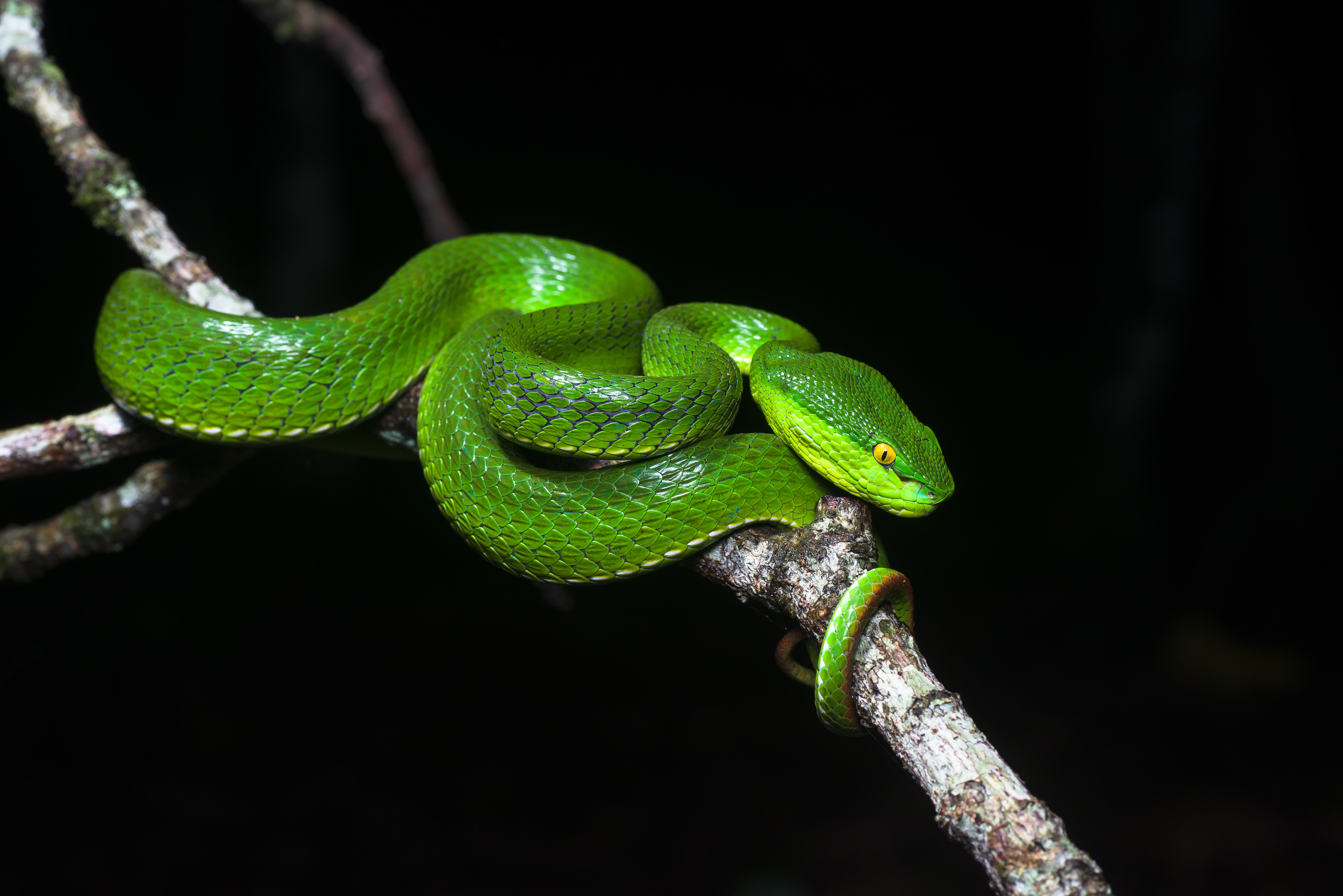
White-lipped pit viper

Family: Viperidae

Common name	Binomial	Endemic	IUCN Status	Comments
Andaman pit viper	Trimeresurus andersonii	Yes	NE	
White-lipped pit viper	Trimeresurus albolabris	No	NE	
Cantor's pit viper	Trimeresurus cantori	Yes	NE	
Nicobar pit viper	Trimeresurus labialis	Yes	NE	
Central Nicobar bamboo pit viper	Trimeresurus mutabilis	Yes	NE	
Car Nicobar green pit viper	Trimeresurus davidi	Yes	NE	
