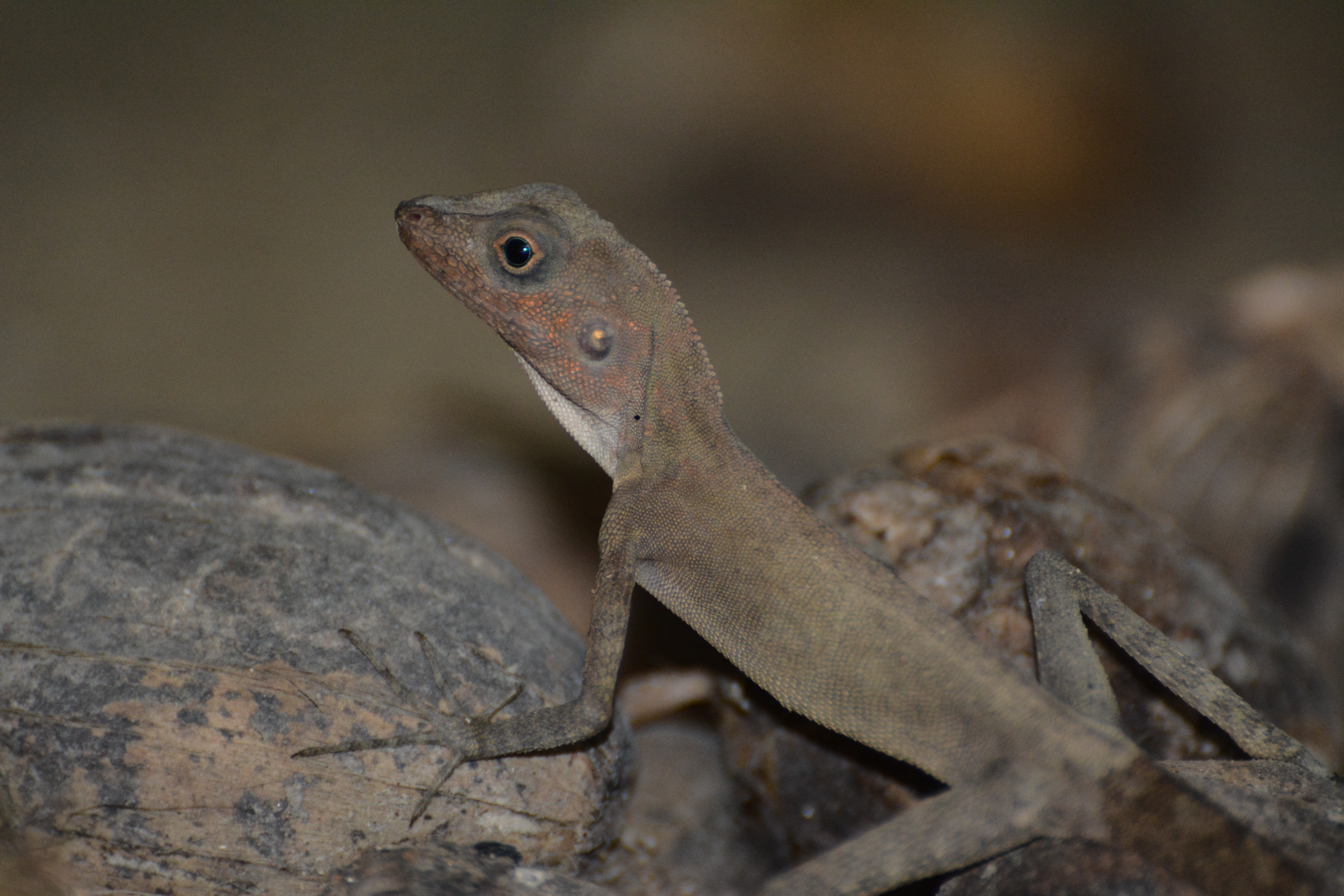

Scientific classification
- Kingdom: Animalia
- Phylum: Chordata
- Class: Reptilia
- Order: Squamata
- Suborder: Iguania
- Family: Agamidae
- Subfamily: Agaminae
- Genus: Coryphophylax; Fitzinger, 1867

Species
- Coryphophylax subcristatus (Blyth, 1861); Coryphophylax brevicauda

= Coryphophylax =

Genus of lizards

Coryphophylax is an agamid genus endemic to the Andaman and Nicobar Islands and a sister of the Southeast Asian Aphaniotis. Found in tropical wet forests, they are common in suitable habitats and shows variations across islands and are sexually dimorphic. The genus is absent on Great Nicobar Island, with its southernmost occurrence on the island of Kondul. The tsunami of December 2004 may have affected island-wide distributions in the Nicobar Islands of several species and also their gene-flow.

== Taxonomic history ==
The species from the Andaman Islands was described by Edward Blyth as Tiaris subcristata in 1860 but technically published in 1861. This species was described by Fitzinger in Steindachner's publication of 1867 and as Tiaris humei by Stoliczka in 1873 and these names are considered junior synonyms but placed in the genus erected by Fitzinger. The closely related genus Aphaniotis (and the more distant Otocryptis) has a concealed tympanum while Gonocephalus has spines on the head or nape.

=== Species ===
| Image | Scientific name | Common name | Distribution |
|---|---|---|---|
| | Coryphophylax subcristatus (Blyth, 1861) | Short-crested Bay Island forest lizard | India (Andaman Island, Nicobar Island) |
| | Coryphophylax brevicauda Harikrishnan, Vasudevan, Chandramouli, Choudhury, Dutta & Das, 2012 | Short-tailed Bay Island forest lizard | India (Andaman Islands) |
| | Coryphophylax krishnani Chandramouli, 2026 | | Car Nicobar |
