= Cyrtodactylus adleri =

Conservation status
- Endangered (IUCN 3.1)

Scientific classification
- Kingdom: Animalia
- Phylum: Chordata
- Class: Reptilia
- Order: Squamata
- Suborder: Gekkota
- Family: Gekkonidae
- Genus: Cyrtodactylus
- Species: C. adleri

Binomial name
- Cyrtodactylus adleri Das, 1997
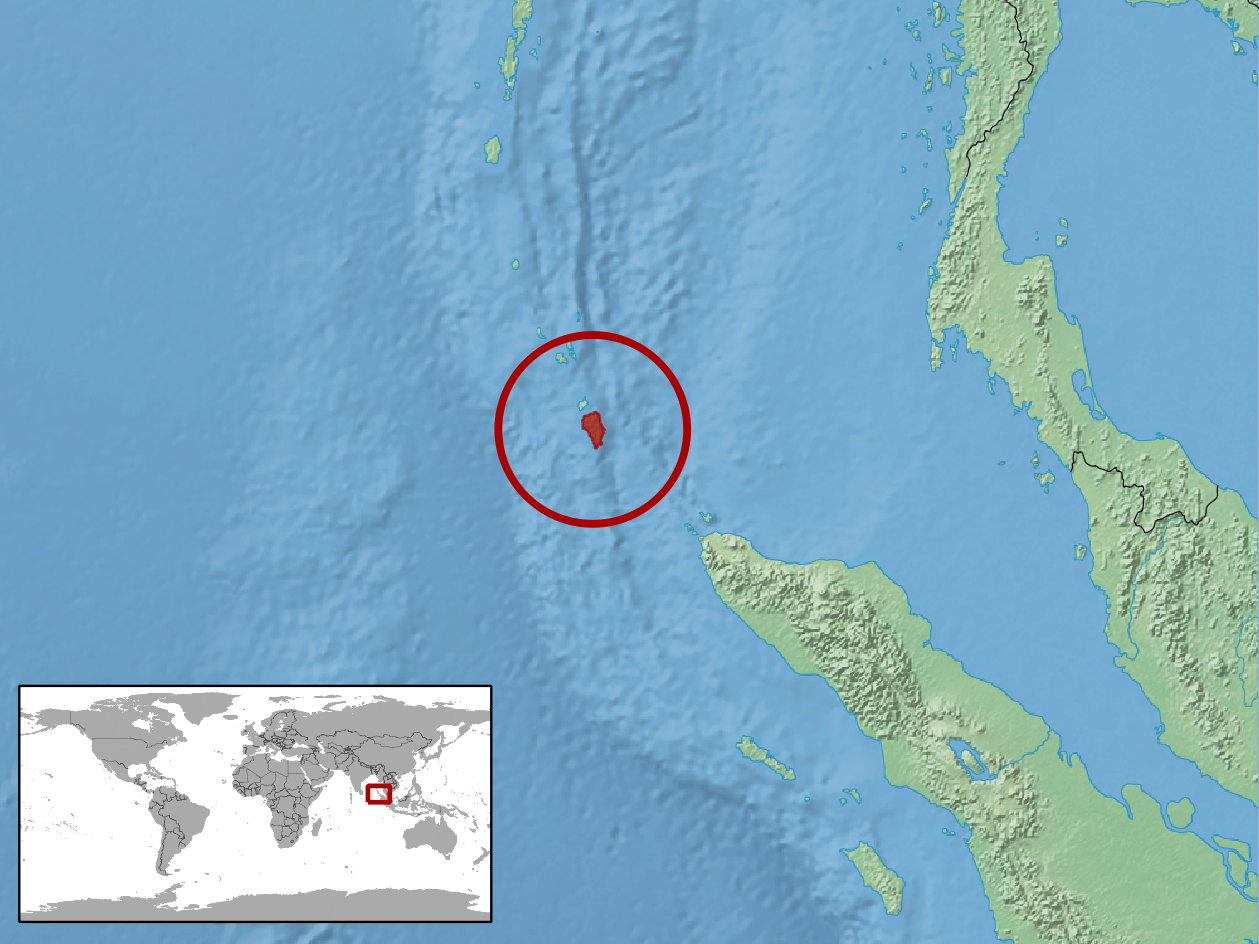

Species of lizard

Cyrtodactylus adleri is a species of bent-toed gecko, a lizard in the family Gekkonidae. The species is native to southern Asia.

== Etymology ==
The specific name, adleri, is in honor of American herpetologist Kraig Adler (born 1940).

== Geographic range ==
C. adleri is found in the Nicobar Islands of India.

== Habitat ==
The preferred natural habitat of C. adleri is forest.

== Description ==
C. adleri was earlier thought to be conspecific with C. rubidus. It can be differentiated from it by its dark spots (vs. dark bands) on the dorsum; differences in the midventral and postnasal scales; and presence of the pre-anal groove. C. adleri may attain a snout-to-vent length (SVL) of 7 cm (2.8 in).

== Behavior ==
C. adleri is nocturnal and arboreal.

== Reproduction ==
C. adleri is oviparous.
