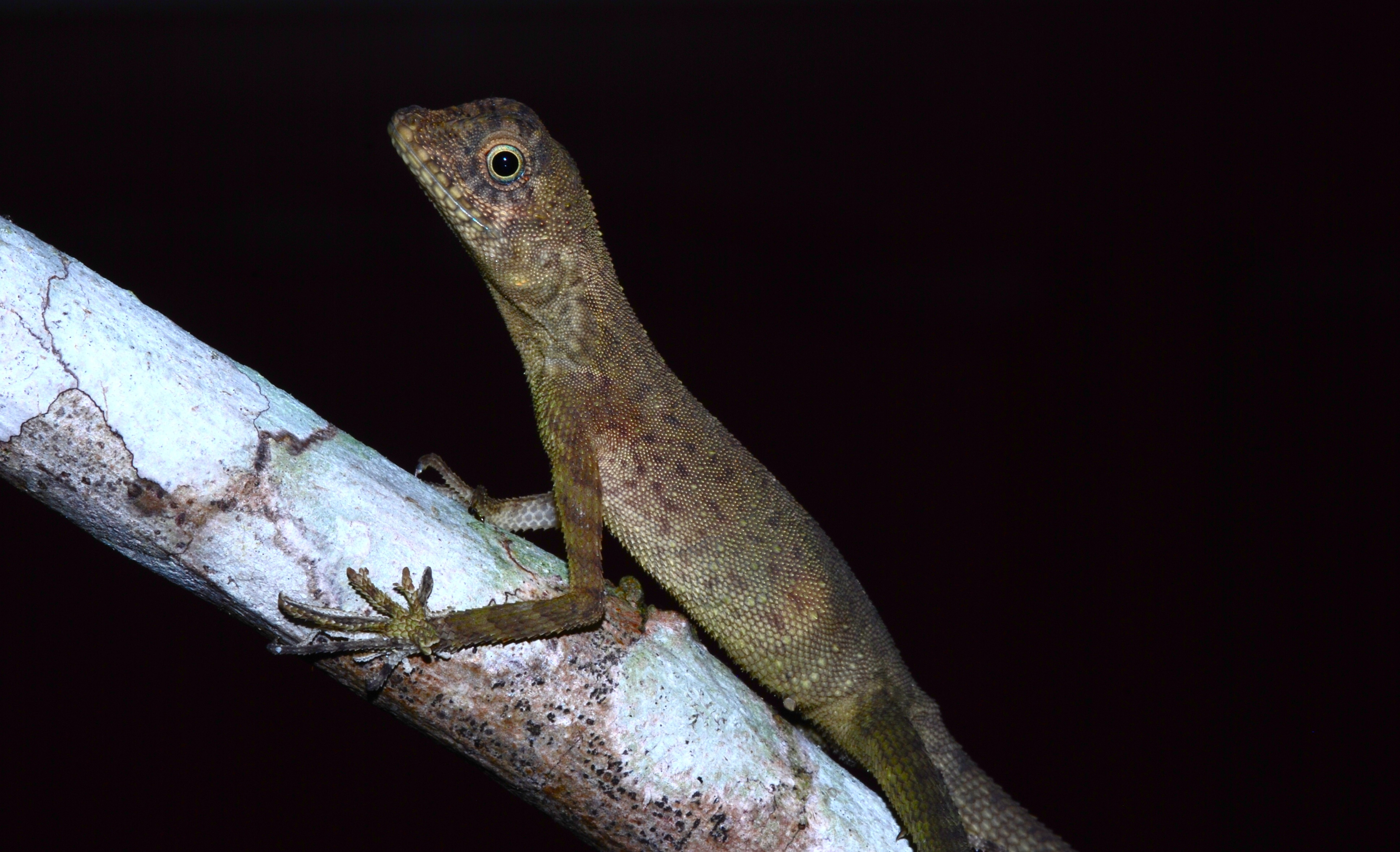

Conservation status
- Least Concern (IUCN 3.1)

Scientific classification
- Kingdom: Animalia
- Phylum: Chordata
- Class: Reptilia
- Order: Squamata
- Suborder: Iguania
- Family: Agamidae
- Genus: Aphaniotis
- Species: A. fusca

Binomial name
- Aphaniotis fusca (Peters, 1864)

= Aphaniotis fusca =

Species of lizard

Aphaniotis fusca, the dusky earless agama or peninsular earless agama, is a species of lizard in the family Agamidae. The species is found in Thailand, Malaysia, and Indonesia.
