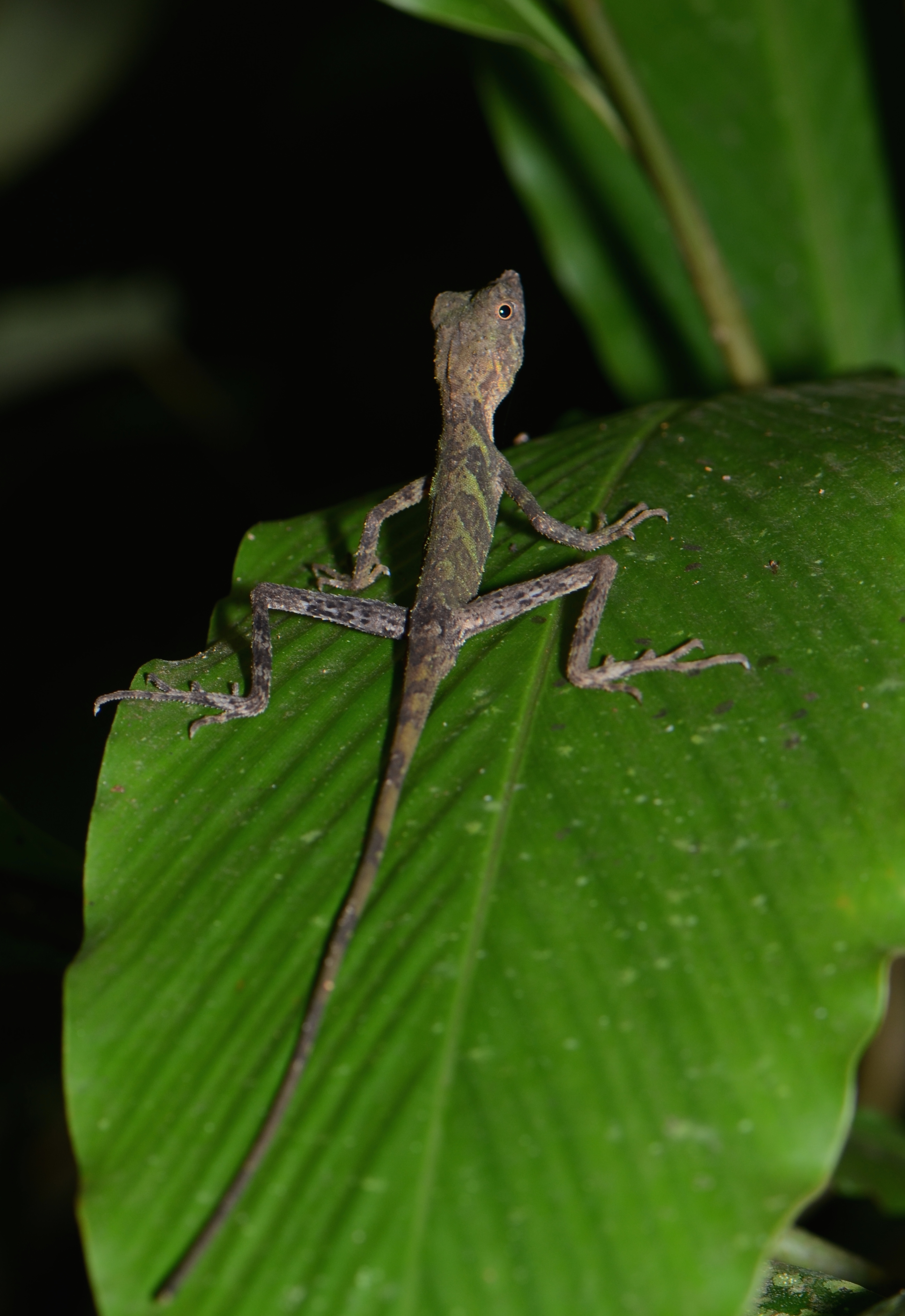

Scientific classification
- Kingdom: Animalia
- Phylum: Chordata
- Class: Reptilia
- Order: Squamata
- Suborder: Iguania
- Family: Agamidae
- Genus: Aphaniotis
- Species: A. acutirostris

Binomial name
- Aphaniotis acutirostris Modigliani, 1889

= Aphaniotis acutirostris =

Species of lizard

Aphaniotis acutirostris, the Indonesia earless agama, is a species of lizard in the family Agamidae. The species is endemic to Indonesia.
