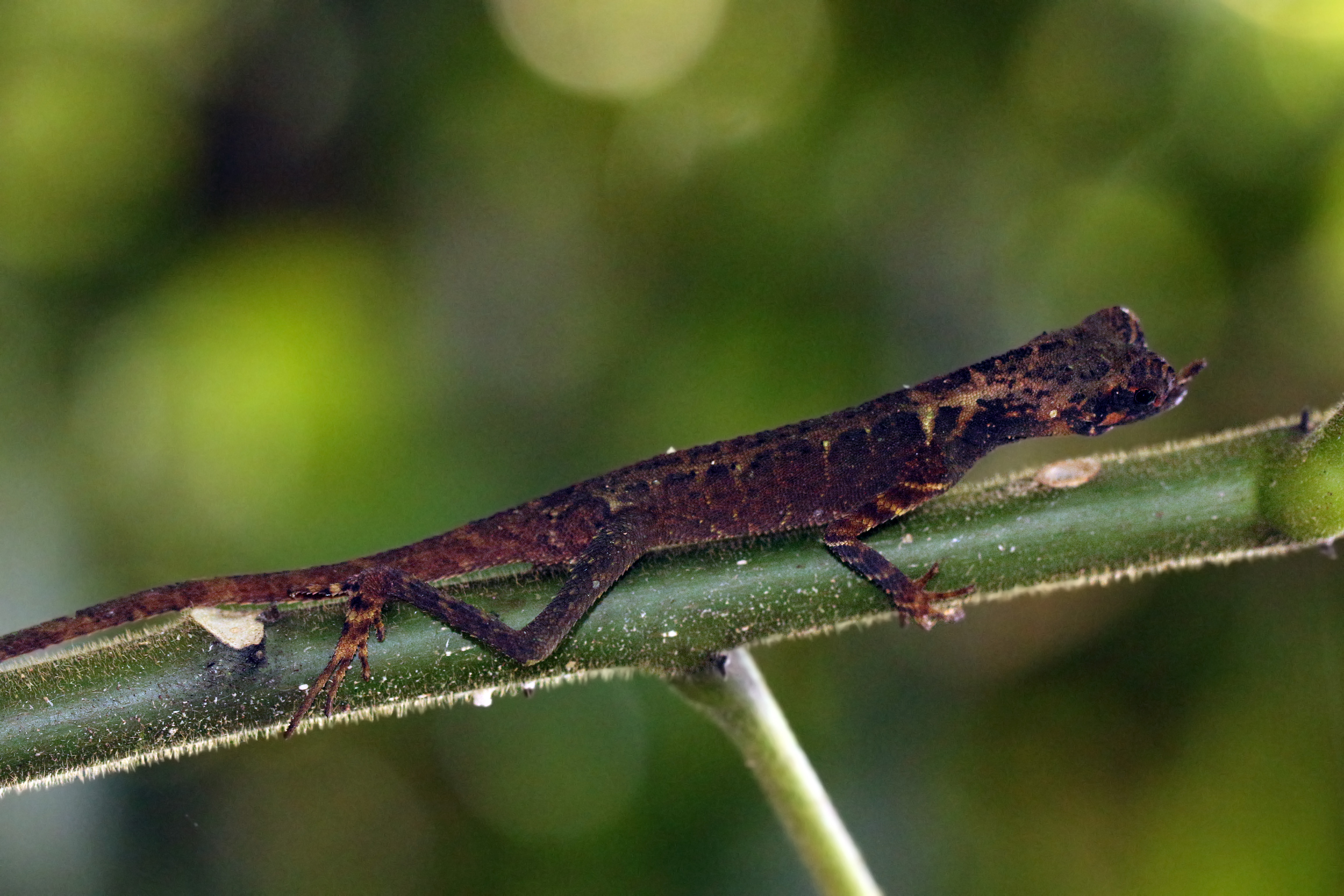
- A. ornata in Danum Valley Conservation Area, Sabah

Conservation status
- Least Concern (IUCN 3.1)

Scientific classification
- Kingdom: Animalia
- Phylum: Chordata
- Class: Reptilia
- Order: Squamata
- Suborder: Iguania
- Family: Agamidae
- Genus: Aphaniotis
- Species: A. ornata

Binomial name
- Aphaniotis ornata (Lidth de Jeude, 1893)

Synonyms
- Japalura ornata Lidth de Jeude, 1893; Japalura nasuta de Jong, 1930; Aphaniotis ornata — Malkmus, 1994

= Aphaniotis ornata =

Species of lizard

Aphaniotis ornata is a species of lizard in the family Agamidae. The species is endemic to Borneo.
