= Cyrtodactylus camortensis =

Scientific classification
- Domain: Eukaryota
- Kingdom: Animalia
- Phylum: Chordata
- Class: Reptilia
- Order: Squamata
- Infraorder: Gekkota
- Family: Gekkonidae
- Genus: Cyrtodactylus
- Species: C. camortensis

Binomial name
- Cyrtodactylus camortensis Chandramouli, 2020

Species of lizard

Cyrtodactylus camortensis is a species of gecko endemic to Kamorta, Nicobar Islands.
