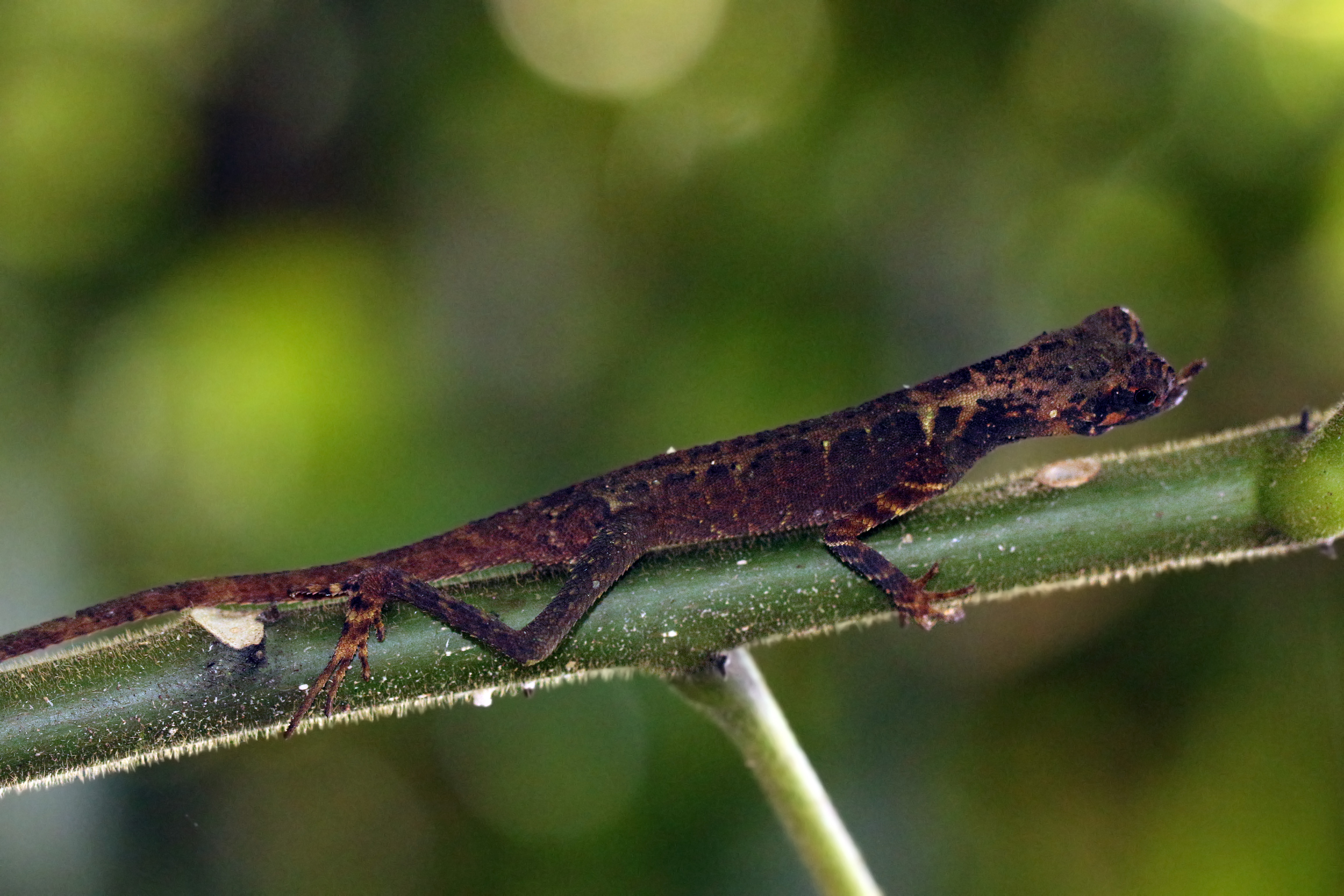
- A. ornata in Danum Valley Conservation Area, Sabah, Borneo, Malaysia

Scientific classification
- Kingdom: Animalia
- Phylum: Chordata
- Class: Reptilia
- Order: Squamata
- Suborder: Iguania
- Family: Agamidae
- Subfamily: Draconinae
- Genus: Aphaniotis; Peters, 1864

= Aphaniotis =

Genus of lizards

Aphaniotis is a genus of agamid lizards from Southeast Asia.

== Species ==
There are three species in genus Aphaniotis:

Image	Scientific name	Common name	Distribution
	Aphaniotis acutirostris Modigliani, 1889	Indonesia earless agama	Indonesia
	Aphaniotis fusca (Peters, 1864)	earless agamid, dusky earless agama, peninsular earless agama	Thailand, Malaysia, and Indonesia
	Aphaniotis ornata (Lidth de Jeude, 1893)	ornate earless agama	Borneo
