= Coryphophylax brevicauda =

Scientific classification
- Kingdom: Animalia
- Phylum: Chordata
- Class: Reptilia
- Order: Squamata
- Suborder: Iguania
- Family: Agamidae
- Genus: Coryphophylax
- Species: C. brevicauda

Binomial name
- Coryphophylax brevicauda Harikrishnan, Vasudevan, Chandramouli, Choudhury, Dutta, & Das, 2012

Species of lizard

Coryphophylax brevicauda, commonly known as the short-tailed Bay Island Forest lizard, is an agamid lizard found in the Andaman and Nicobar Islands.
