= Cyrtodactylus nicobaricus =

Scientific classification
- Kingdom: Animalia
- Phylum: Chordata
- Class: Reptilia
- Order: Squamata
- Suborder: Gekkota
- Family: Gekkonidae
- Genus: Cyrtodactylus
- Species: C. nicobaricus

Binomial name
- Cyrtodactylus nicobaricus Chandramouli, 2020

Species of lizard

Cyrtodactylus nicobaricus is a species of gecko endemic to the Nicobar Islands (India).
