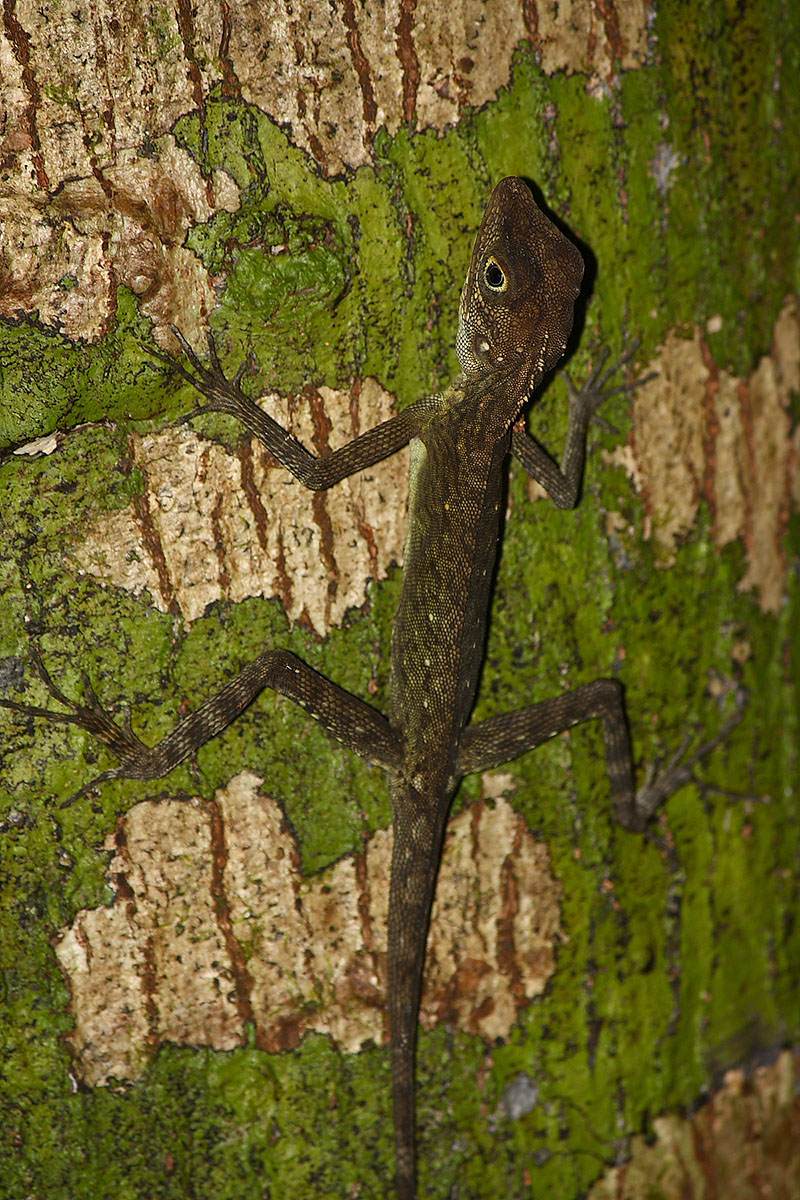

Scientific classification
- Kingdom: Animalia
- Phylum: Chordata
- Class: Reptilia
- Order: Squamata
- Suborder: Iguania
- Family: Agamidae
- Genus: Coryphophylax
- Species: C. subcristatus

Binomial name
- Coryphophylax subcristatus (Blyth, 1861)

Synonyms
- Gonyocephalus subcristatus Blyth 1861; Coryphophylax maximiliani Fitzinger (in Steindachner) 1867; Tiaris humei Stolickzka 1873

= Coryphophylax subcristatus =

Species of lizard

Coryphophylax subcristatus, the short-crested bay island forest lizard, is an agamid lizard found in the Andaman and Nicobar Islands. It does not occur south of 7° 11' 58.94" N (as of Aug 2004).
