= Cnemaspis andersonii =

Scientific classification
- Domain: Eukaryota
- Kingdom: Animalia
- Phylum: Chordata
- Class: Reptilia
- Order: Squamata
- Infraorder: Gekkota
- Family: Gekkonidae
- Genus: Cnemaspis
- Species: C. andersonii

Binomial name
- Cnemaspis andersonii (Annandale, 1905)

Synonyms
- Gonatodes andersonii

Species of lizard

Cnemaspis andersonii is a species of gecko endemic to the Andaman Islands.
