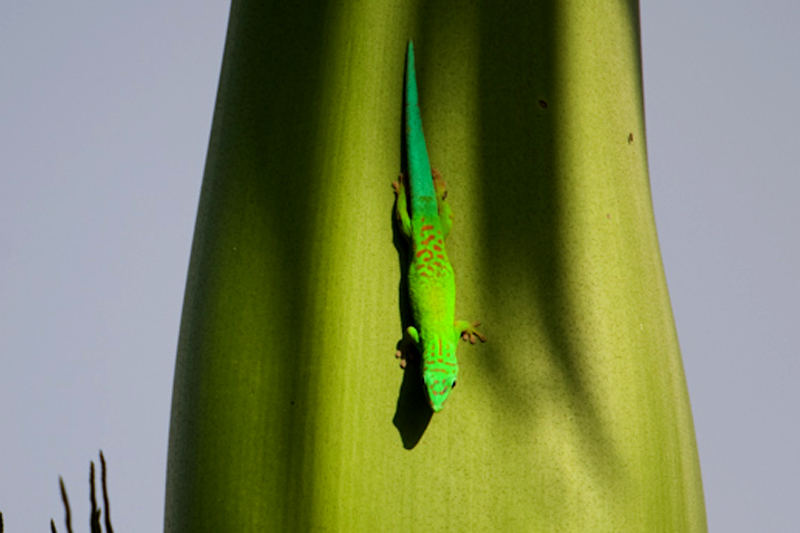

Conservation status
- Least Concern (IUCN 3.1)

Scientific classification
- Kingdom: Animalia
- Phylum: Chordata
- Class: Reptilia
- Order: Squamata
- Suborder: Gekkota
- Family: Gekkonidae
- Genus: Phelsuma
- Species: P. andamanensis

Binomial name
- Phelsuma andamanensis Blyth, 1861
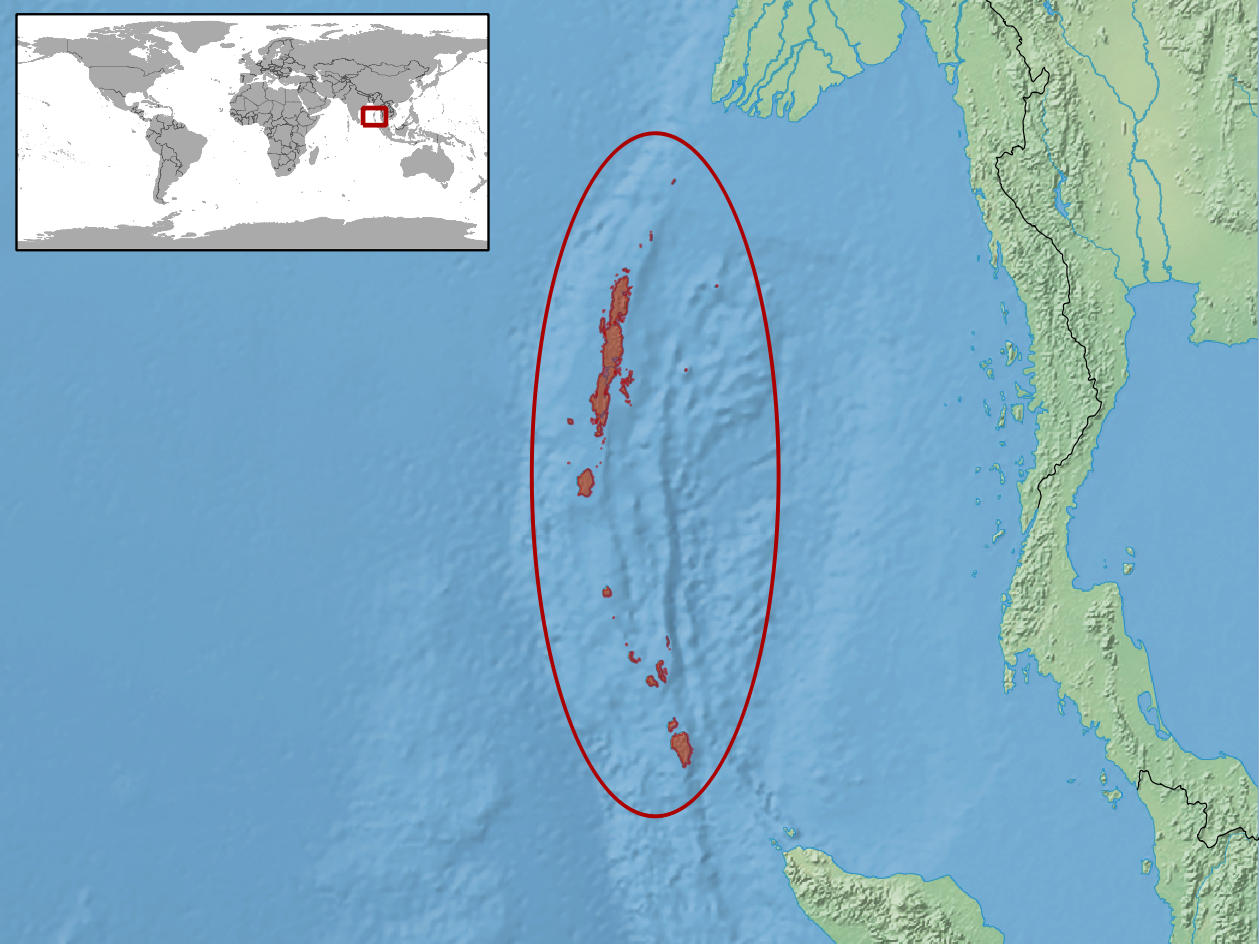

Synonyms
- Gecko chameleon Tytler, 1864; Phelsuma madagascariensis andamanense Loveridge, 1942

= Andaman day gecko =

Species of lizard

The Andaman day gecko (Phelsuma andamanensis), also known as the Andaman Islands day gecko, is a species of gecko in the genus Phelsuma. It is endemic to the Andaman Islands of India, and has recently been introduced to the Nicobar Islands. It is a small, slender lizard, has a bright green colour and feeds on insects. Its range is nearly 5000 km away from the centre of the distribution area of the genus Phelsuma, in Mauritius and Madagascar.

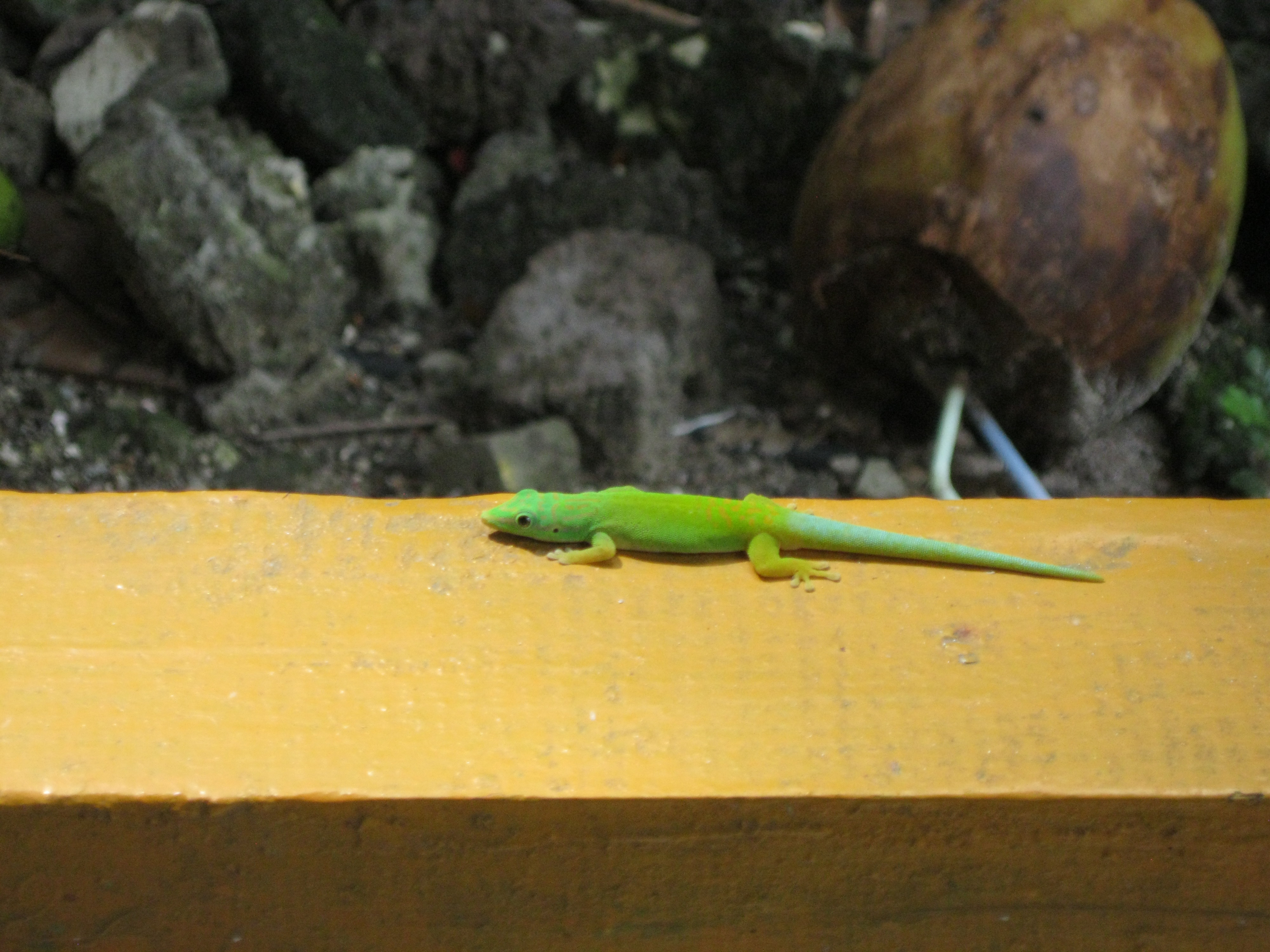
Andaman Islands day gecko

== Taxonomy ==
Phylogenetic evidence indicates that P. andamanensis is the most basal extant member of the genus Phelsuma, having diverged from the clade containing all the Western Indian Ocean Phelsuma species during the late Oligocene, about 27 million years ago. In its home range, an immense genetic diversity of mitochondrial haplotypes is seen among individuals, indicating that it had colonized the Andamans entirely naturally and not due to humans somehow transporting it from the Western Indian Ocean islands.

Unlike with the Western Indian Ocean species, there has been no major speciation throughout the Andamans despite P. andamanensis having existed and diversified on the Andamans for millions of years. The species can however be divided into two major clades or population clusters: a 'North' cluster and a 'South' cluster; both clusters are thought to have diverged before the onset of the Last Glacial Maximum, although what exactly caused their divergence is unknown.

== Distribution ==
The Andaman day gecko is found throughout the Andaman Islands of India, with the 'North' clade being found on North Andaman, Middle Andaman, Interview, Baratang, Shaheed Dweep, and Long Islands, while the 'South' clade is found on Swaraj Dweep, South Andaman, and Little Andaman Islands. While the species reached the Andaman Islands through natural means, parts of its range within the islands may be a consequence of human-mediated dispersal due to its generalist lifestyle. It has also recently been sighted on the Nicobar Islands for the first time, which is likely also a consequence of human introduction.

== Description ==
The body of this day gecko is bright green with red dots and stripes on the back. Males have a bluish or turquoise coloured tail. On both sides of the snout, a reddish-brown stripe is extending from the nostrils to the ear. The undersurface of the body is bright yellow or off-white.

== Habitat ==
Phelsuma andamanensis inhabits lowlands where is typically found in domestic gardens on coconut palms, screw pines, banana trees and on sisal plants. It also sometimes lives on local huts. This generalist lifestyle has allowed it to have a major population expansion with the growth of cash crops on the Andamans, making it a rare example of an island-endemic reptile that has actually massively benefited from anthropogenic disturbance. However, this new, dense population may make them more susceptible to stressors such as parasites and diseases.

== Behaviour ==
These shy day geckos are extremely aggressive toward other members of its species.

== Reproduction ==
Phelsuma andamanensis normally lays two eggs in a protected and elevated location. The females can be extraordinarily fertile. It has been observed that during a period of 18 months, 14 pairs of eggs were laid.
