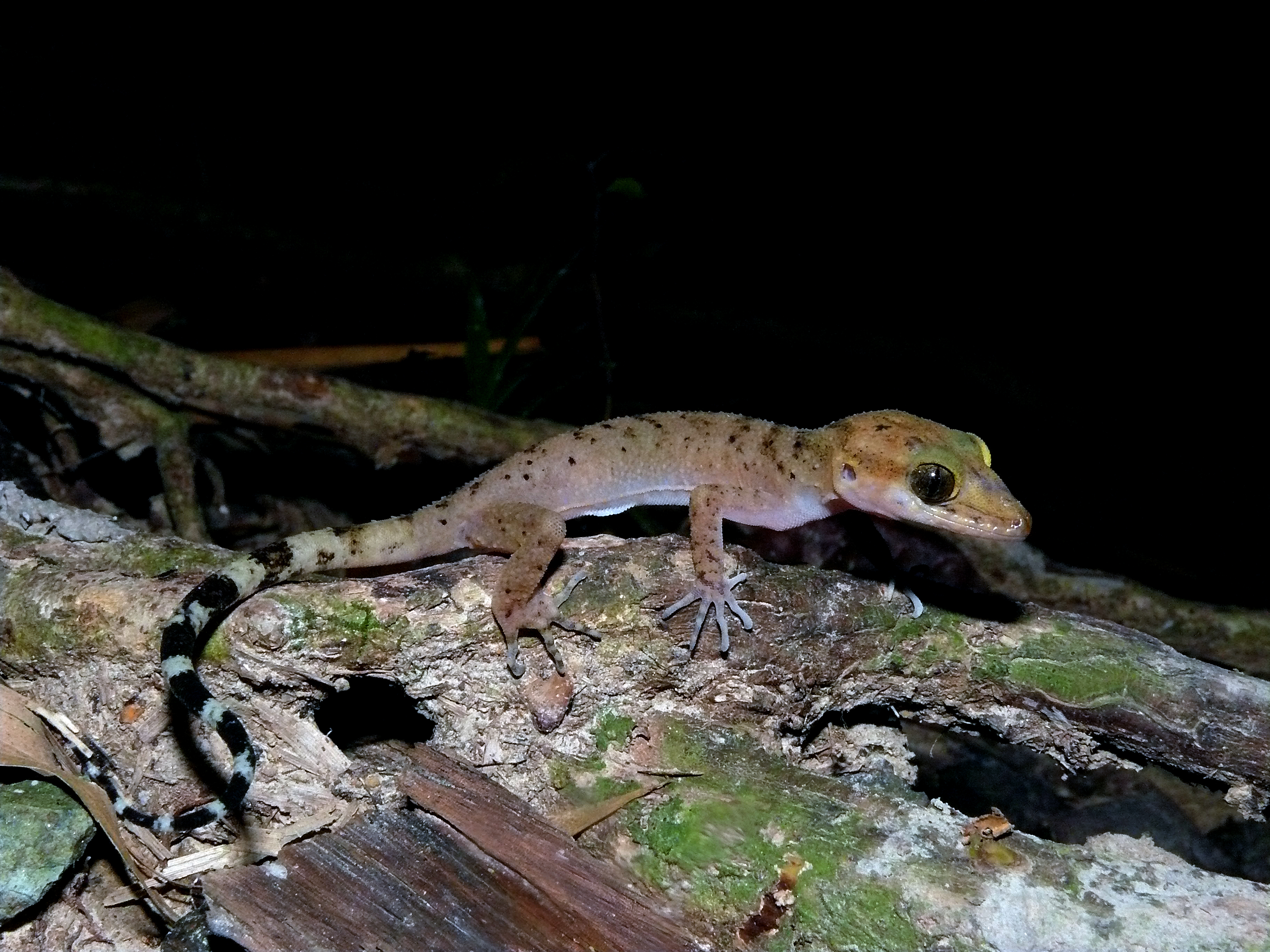

Scientific classification
- Kingdom: Animalia
- Phylum: Chordata
- Class: Reptilia
- Order: Squamata
- Suborder: Gekkota
- Family: Gekkonidae
- Genus: Cyrtodactylus
- Species: C. rubidus

Binomial name
- Cyrtodactylus rubidus (Blyth, 1861)

Synonyms
- Puellula rubida; Gymnodactylus rubidus

= Cyrtodactylus rubidus =

Species of lizard

Cyrtodactylus rubidus (common names Andaman bent-toed gecko or red bow-fingered gecko) is a species of gecko found in the Andaman Islands (India) and the Coco Islands (Myanmar). The type locality is Port Blair, Andaman Islands.

== Description ==
Small to medium-sized gecko with black-banded/blotched with yellowish brown body, and with a tail banded black and white. Head long; snout tapering; ear-opening small, oval; digits with enlarged lamellae on the ventral surface; tail with small tubercles, long and tapering to a fine point; three enlarged tubercles on either side of the cloaca; males with six pre-anal pores; a longitudinal pre-anal groove present, prominent in males, less distinct but present in females; dorsal and lateral aspects of body covered in distinct, obtuse tubercles. Dorsum and forehead reddish brown to dark grey, the latter with a series of transverse bands, sometimes connected medially to forma network of reticulations; a dark line from posterior corner eyes to armpit; tail with ten dark bands on a white or grey background.

== Natural history ==
Inhabits lowland rainforests, and deciduous forests. Sometimes found inside houses close to forest areas. Both terrestrial and arboreal, hiding under bark, leaflitter, roots, logs, or rocks during the day and emerging to forage at night. When threatened, they raise and curl their tails. This species is oviparous, laying two eggs at a time. Eggs are laid under tree bark, or under fallen logs.

== Distribution ==
This species is endemic to the Andaman & Nicobar Islands in Bay of Bengal, India. Within these islands, it is found only in the Andaman Islands, north of Ten Degree Channel.
