= List of reptiles of Israel =

Israel has 93 species of reptiles, almost a third of which live in its northern areas. The reptiles of Israel live in environments ranging from the Negev Desert to the Red Sea, from the Jordan River to the Judaean Mountains. Two species are extirpated in the country.

The following tags are used to highlight each species' conservation status as assessed by the International Union for Conservation of Nature:

EX	Extinct	No reasonable doubt that the last individual has died.
EW	Extinct in the wild	Known only to survive in captivity or as a naturalized populations well outside its previous range.
CR	Critically endangered	The species is in imminent risk of extinction in the wild.
EN	Endangered	The species is facing an extremely high risk of extinction in the wild.
VU	Vulnerable	The species is facing a high risk of extinction in the wild.
NT	Near threatened	The species does not meet any of the criteria that would categorise it as risking extinction but it is likely to do so in the future.
LC	Least concern	There are no current identifiable risks to the species.
DD	Data deficient	There is inadequate information to make an assessment of the risks to this species.

== Turtles and tortoises ==
=== Pond turtles ===
- Pond slider (Trachemys scripta)
- Balkan terrapin (Mauremys rivulata)

=== Sea turtles ===
- Loggerhead sea turtle (Caretta caretta)
- Green sea turtle (Chelonia mydas)
- Hawksbill sea turtle (Eretmochelys imbricata) CR
- Leatherback sea turtle (Dermochelys coriacea) VU

=== Softshell turtles ===
- African softshell turtle (Trionyx triunguis) CR

=== Tortoises ===
- Spur-thighed tortoise (Testudo graeca)
- Negev tortoise (Testudo kleinmanni)

== Lizards ==
=== Agamid lizards ===
- Starred agama (Stellagama stellio) LC
- Aqaba agama (Pseudotrapelus aqabensis)
- Trapelus agnetae CR
- Savigny's agama (Trapelus savignii) VU
- Egyptian mastigure (Uromastyx aegyptia) VU
- Ornate mastigure (Uromastyx ornata) LC

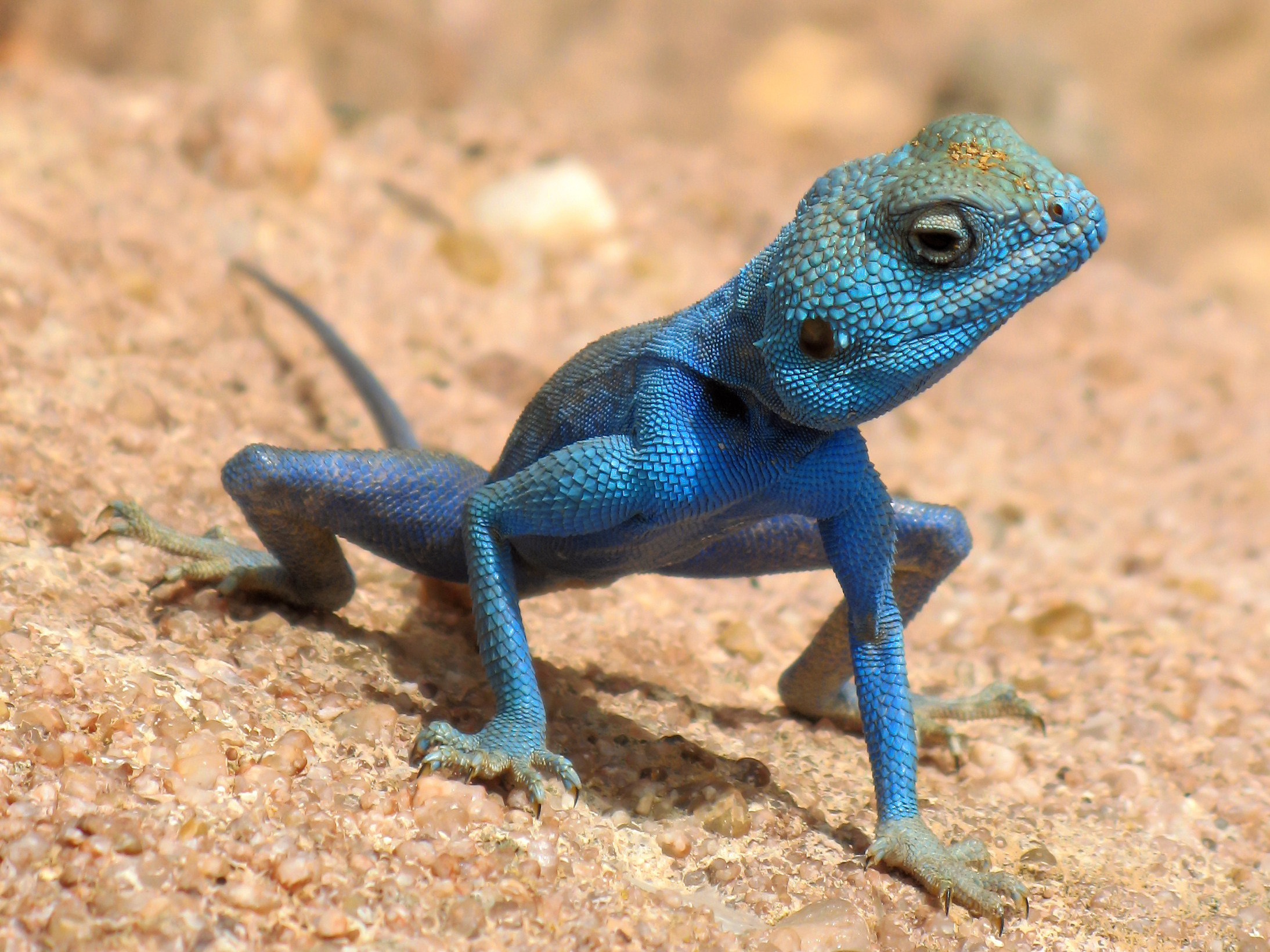
A bright blue male Sinai agama during the breeding season.

=== Chameleons ===
- Common chameleon (Chamaeleo chamaeleon) NA

=== Geckos ===
- Arabian desert gecko (Bunopus tuberculatus)
- Rough-tailed gecko (Cyrtopodion scabrum)
- Mediterranean house gecko (Hemidactylus turcicus)
- Lebanese thin-toed gecko (Mediodactylus amictopholis)
- Mediterranean thin-toed gecko (Mediodactylus orientalis) LC
- Sinai fan-fingered gecko (Ptyodactylus guttatus)
- Fan-footed gecko (Ptyodactylus hasselquistii) LC
- Israeli fan-fingered gecko (Ptyodactylus puiseuxi)
- Middle Eastern short-fingered gecko (Stenodactylus doriae)
- Dune gecko (Stenodactylus petrii)
- Elegant gecko (Stenodactylus sthenodactylus) LC
- White-spotted wall gecko (Tarentola annularis) LC
- Natterer's gecko (Tropiocolotes nattereri) LC
- Tropiocolotes yomtovi

=== Glass lizards ===
- European glass lizard (Pseudopus apodus) LC

=== Lacertid lizards ===
- Acanthodactylus aegyptius
- Be'er Sheva fringe-fingered lizard (Acanthodactylus beershebensis) CR
- Bosc's fringe-toed lizard (Acanthodactylus boskianus) LC
- Arnold's fringe-fingered lizard (Acanthodactylus opheodurus) LC
- Acanthodactylus scutellatus LC
- Lacerta media LC
- Mesalina bahaeldini LC
- Olivier's sand lizard (Mesalina olivieri) LC
- Snake-eyed lizard (Ophisops elegans) LC
- Mount Lebanon rock lizard (Phoenicolacerta kulzeri) EN
- Lebanon lizard (Phoenicolacerta laevis) LC

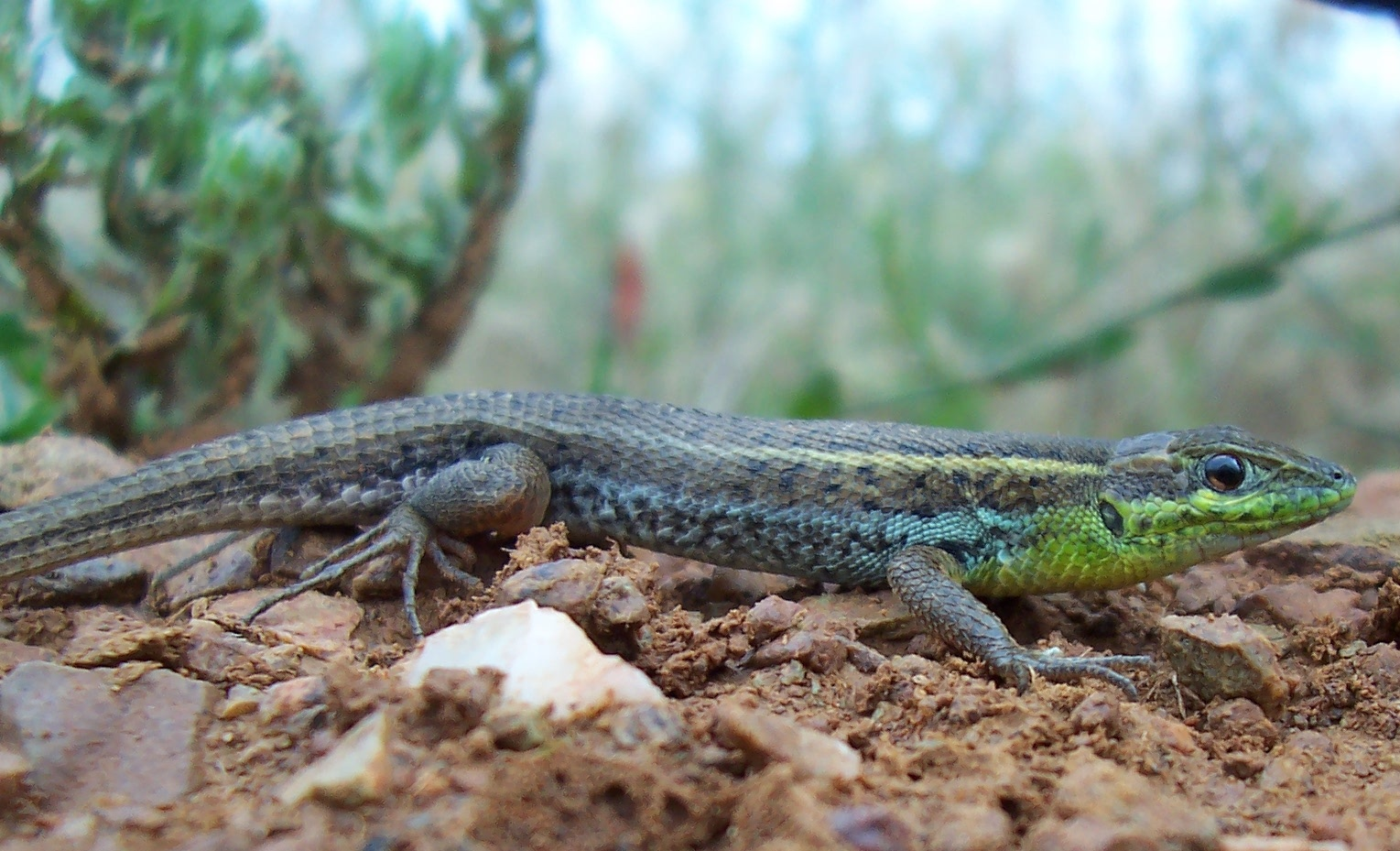
Ophisops elegans

LC

=== Monitor lizards ===
- Nile monitor (Varanus niloticus) LC (extirpated)
- Desert monitor (Varanus griseus) LC

=== Skinks ===
- Rüppell's snake-eyed skink (Ablepharus rueppellii) LC
- Günther's cylindrical skink (Chalcides guentheri) VU
- Ocellated skink (Chalcides ocellatus) LC
- Chalcides sepsoides LC
- Schneider's skink (Eumeces schneiderii) DD
- Bridled mabuya (Heremites vittatus) LC
- Latast's snake skink (Ophiomorus latastii) DD
- Sandfish (Scincus scincus)

== Snakes ==
=== Blindsnakes ===
- Long-nosed worm snake (Leptotyphlops macrorhynchus)
- Letheobia simonii LC
- Eurasian blindsnake (Xerotyphlops vermicularis) LC

=== Boas ===
- Javelin sand boa (Eryx jaculus) LC

=== Colubrid snakes ===
- Black whipsnake (Dolichophis jugularis) LC
- Crowned dwarf racer (Eirenis coronella) LC
- Narrow-striped dwarf racer (Eirenis decemlineatus) LC
- Levantine dwarf racer (Eirenis levantinus) DD
- Eirenis lineomaculatus LC
- Roth's dwarf racer (Eirenis rothii) LC
- Levant rat snake (Elaphe druzei)
- Coin-marked snake (Hemorrhois nummifer) LC
- Crowned leafnose snake (Lytorhynchus diadema) LC
- False smooth snake (Macroprotodon cucullatus) DD
- Dice snake (Natrix tessellata) LC
- Red whip snake (Platyceps collaris)
- Elegant racer (Platyceps elegantissimus) LC
- Roger's racer (Platyceps rogersi) LC
- Sahara racer (Platyceps saharicus) LC
- Sinai racer (Platyceps sinai) NT
- Dayan's kukri snake (Rhynchocalamus dayanae)
- Palestine kukri snake (Rhynchocalamus melanocephalus)
- Blotched diadem snake (Spalerosophis diadema) LC
- Arabian cat snake (Telescopus dhara) LC
- Mediterranean cat snake (Telescopus fallax) LC
- Hoogstraal's cat snake (Telescopus hoogstraali) EN
- Transcaucasian ratsnake (Zamenis hohenackeri) DD

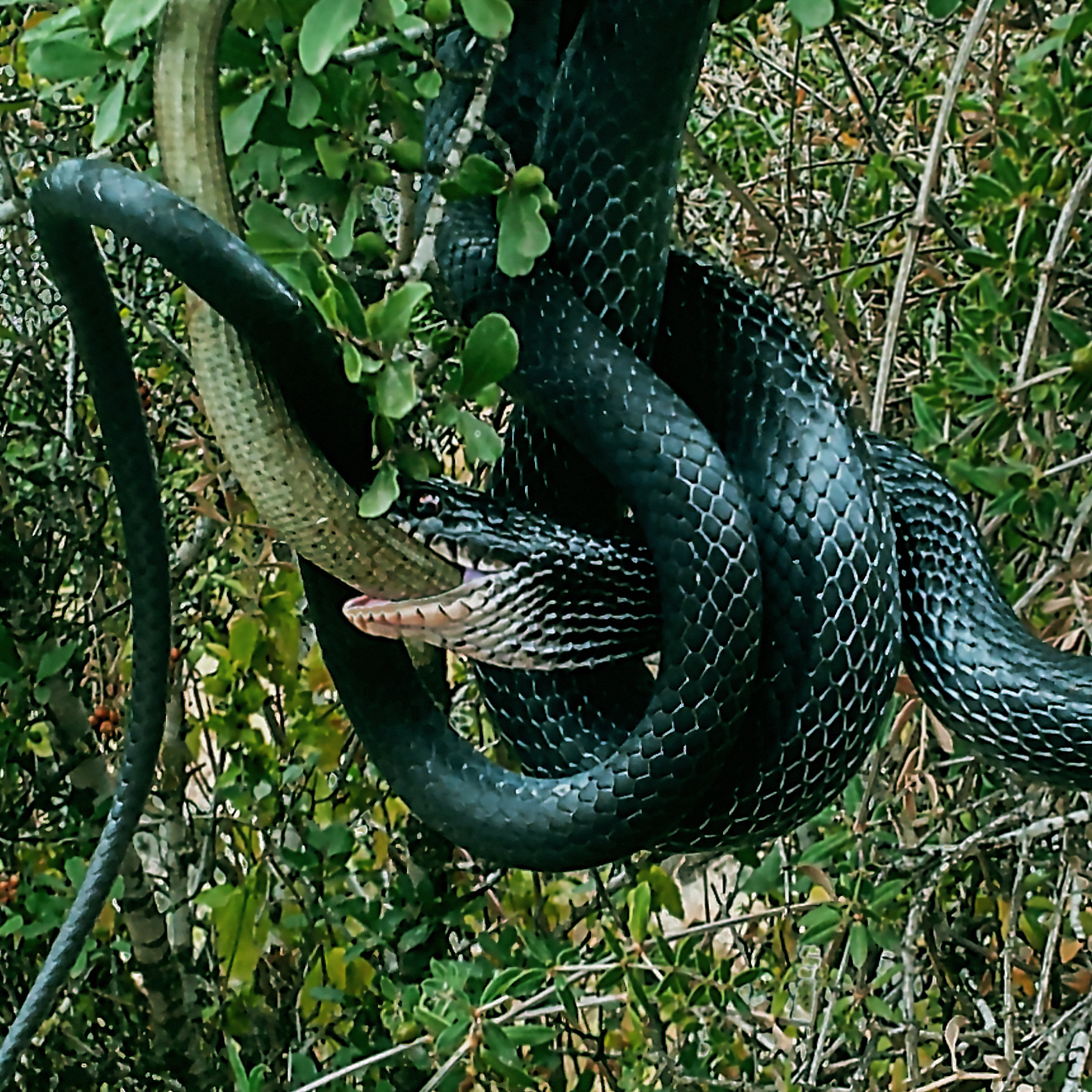
A black whipsnake (Dolichophis jugularis) preying on a European glass lizard (Pseudopus apodus) in the Valley of Elah.

=== Elapid snakes ===
- Desert black snake (Walterinnesia aegyptia) LC

=== Lamprophiid snakes ===
- Eastern Montpellier snake (Malpolon insignitus) LC
- False cobra (Malpolon moilensis)
- Müller's black-headed snake (Micrelaps muelleri) LC
- Psammophis aegyptius LC
- Schokari sand racer (Psammophis schokari) LC

=== Mole vipers ===
- Israeli mole viper (Atractaspis engaddensis)

=== Vipers ===
- Desert horned viper (Cerastes cerastes) LC
- Arabian horned viper (Cerastes gasperettii) LC
- Saharan sand viper (Cerastes vipera)LC
- Painted saw-scaled viper (Echis coloratus) LC
- Field's horned viper (Pseudocerastes fieldi) LC
- Lebanon viper (Montivipera bornmuelleri) EN
- Palestine viper (Daboia palaestinae) LC

== Crocodilians ==
=== Crocodiles ===
- Nile crocodile (Crocodylus niloticus) LC (extirpated)

== See also ==
- Wildlife of Israel
- Biodiversity in Israel
- List of birds of Israel
- List of endemic flora of Israel
- List of mammals of Israel
- Society for the Protection of Nature in Israel
