= List of reptiles of Lebanon =

This is a list of reptiles found in Lebanon.

Emydid turtles

- Balkan terrapin, Mauremys rivulata

Land tortoises

- Greek tortoise, Testudo graeca

Marine turtles

- Loggerhead turtle, Caretta caretta
- Green turtle, Chelonia mydas

Softshell turtles

- Nile softshell turtle, Trionyx triunguis

Agamid lizards

- Rough-tailed rock agama, Laudakia stellio
- Trapelus ruderatus

Chameleons

- Mediterranean chameleon, Chamaeleo chamaeleon

Geckos

- Levant fan-fingered gecko, Ptyodactylus puiseuxi
- Kotschy's gecko, Mediodactylus kotschyi
- Turkish gecko, Hemidactylus turcicus

Lacertid lizards

- Giant fringe-fingered lizard, Acanthodactylus grandis
- Schreiber's fringe-fingered lizard, Acanthodactylus schreiberi
- Lebanon fringe-fingered lizard, Acanthodactylus tristrami
- Wall lizard, Podarcis muralis
- Fraas's lizard, Parvilacerta fraasii
- Phoenicolacerta kulzeri
- Lebanon lizard, Phoenicolacerta laevis
- Levant green lizard, Lacerta media
- Blanford's short-nosed desert lizard, Mesalina brevirostris
- European snake-eyed lizard, Ophisops elegans

Skinks

- Rüppell's snake-eyed skink, Ablepharus rueppellii
- Ocellated skink, Chalcides ocellatus
- Bridled skink, Heremites vittatus
- Schneider's skink, Eumeces schneiderii
- Lataste's snake skink, Ophiomorus latastii
- Golden grass mabuya, Heremites auratus
- Budak's snake-eyed skink, Ablepharus budaki

Legless lizards

- European glass lizard, Pseudopus apodus
- Chalcides guentheri

Monitor lizards

- Desert monitor, Varanus griseus

Amphisbaenids

- Turkish worm lizard, Blanus strauchi

Blind snakes

- European blind snake, Xerotyphlops vermicularis

Pythons and boas

- Caucasian sand boa, Eryx jaculus

Colubrid snakes

- Black whipsnake, Dolichophis jugularis
- Coin-marked snake, Hemorrhois nummifer
- Roger's racer, Platyceps rogersi
- Red whip snake, Platyceps collaris
- Eirenis decemlineatus, Eirenis decemlineatus
- Eirenis levantinus
- Asia Minor dwarf racer, Eirenis modestus
- Transcaucasian ratsnake, Zamenis hohenackeri
- Montpellier snake, Malpolon insignutus
- Dice snake, Natrix tessellata
- European tiger snake, Telescopus fallax syriacus

Elapids

- Black desert cobra, Walterinnesia aegyptia

Burrowing asps

- Israeli mole viper, Atractaspis engaddensis
- Müller's two-headed snake, Micrelaps muelleri

Vipers and pit vipers

- Lebanon viper, Montivipera bornmuelleri
- Levant viper, Macrovipera lebetinus
- Palestine viper, Daboia palaestinae
