= Golden grass mabuya =

There are two species of skink named golden grass mabuya:

- Heremites auratus, a species of skink found in Greece and Turkey, among other places
- Heremites septemtaeniatus, a species of skink found in the Middle East
