= Eirenis rafsanjanicus =

Scientific classification
- Kingdom: Animalia
- Phylum: Chordata
- Class: Reptilia
- Order: Squamata
- Suborder: Serpentes
- Family: Colubridae
- Genus: Eirenis
- Species: E. rafsanjanicus

Binomial name
- Eirenis rafsanjanicus Akbarpour, N. Rastegar-Pouyani, Fathinia, & E. Rastegar-Pouyani, 2020

Species of snake

Eirenis rafsanjanicus is a species of non-venomous snake in the family Colubridae that is found in Iran.

It is named after the Rafsanjan County, where the holotype and paratype were collected.
