= Eirenis hakkariensis =

Scientific classification
- Kingdom: Animalia
- Phylum: Chordata
- Class: Reptilia
- Order: Squamata
- Suborder: Serpentes
- Family: Colubridae
- Genus: Eirenis
- Species: E. hakkariensis

Binomial name
- Eirenis hakkariensis J.F. Schmidtler & Eiselt, 1991

Species of snake

Eirenis hakkariensis is a species of non-venomous snake in the family Colubridae. The species is found in Turkey.
