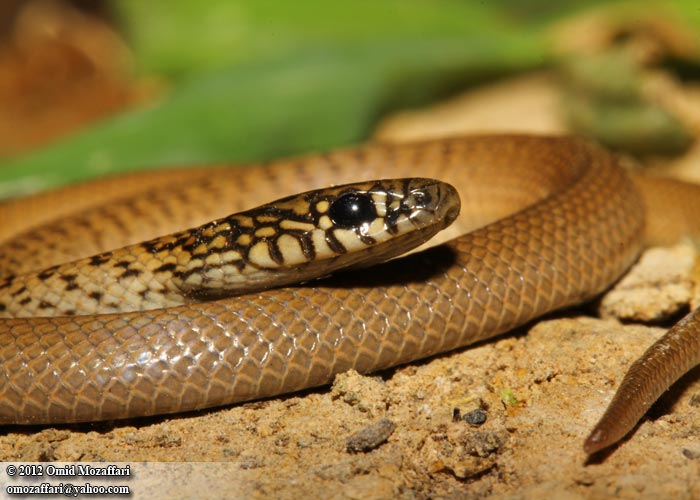

Conservation status
- Least Concern (IUCN 3.1)

Scientific classification
- Kingdom: Animalia
- Phylum: Chordata
- Class: Reptilia
- Order: Squamata
- Suborder: Serpentes
- Family: Colubridae
- Genus: Eirenis
- Species: E. medus

Binomial name
- Eirenis medus (Chernov, 1940)

= Eirenis medus =

Species of snake

Eirenis medus is a species of nonvenomous dwarf snake from the family Colubridae. Its common names include Ashkhabad Dwarf Racer, Turkmen Dwarf Snake, and Striped Dwarf Snake. It is commonly found under rocks in semi-deserts and canyons throughout Iran and southern Turkmenistan at altitudes between 1100–1600 m (approx. 3609–5249 ft.) above sea level. It is insectivorous along with eating small lizards and other arthropods.

== Behavior ==
E. medus is considered to be a nocturnal species. It exhibits limited diurnal activity, however. Most of the species' time is spent under stones, which act as both home and hunting grounds. The reasons it may emerge from under its rock are to find new shelters with optimal temperature, humidity, and food, or to find partners during the breeding season. It has been found active on rocky slopes from April through October, though never in midsummer. The population density of E. medus is up to 133 per hectare. The species is considered to be of least concern by the IUCN.

== Morphology ==
E. medus can be distinguished from other Eirenis species by its dorsal scale count of 15 smooth rows and its 50 narrow crossbars along its dorsum. They may get as long as 430 mm long with males having a greater range of length being both the smallest and largest specimens, although females are larger than males on average. E. medus has a light greyish-brown dorsal surface with brown crossbars and a salmon belly. It is oviparous and delivers clutches of 2–3 eggs which can get up to 18 mm long.

== Taxonomy ==
E. medus has undergone multiple taxonomic changes. It was initially grouped with Syrian dwarf snakes under the name Eirenis fasciatus. It was first described as a distinct species by Chernov in 1950 using the name Contia meda. In 1977 Schmidtler & Schmidtler stated that E. medus was one of the only species of Eirenis whose taxonomic status had been clarified. In 1989 Doczenko placed the snake under the subgenus Collaria with some other members of the Eirenis genus. It is considered a monotypic species.
