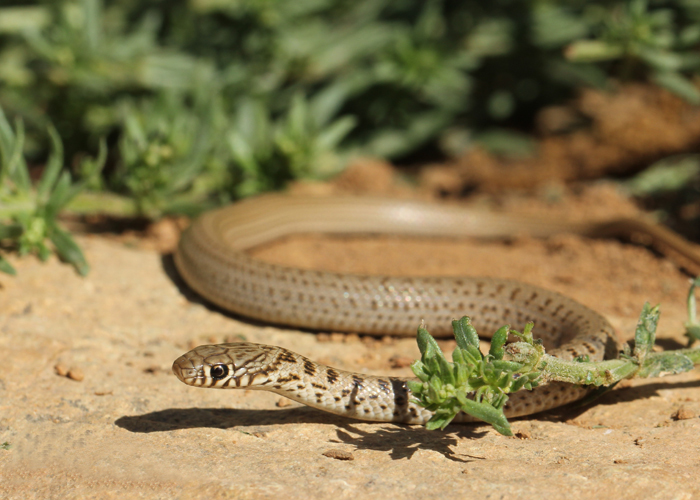

Conservation status
- Least Concern (IUCN 3.1)

Scientific classification
- Kingdom: Animalia
- Phylum: Chordata
- Class: Reptilia
- Order: Squamata
- Suborder: Serpentes
- Family: Colubridae
- Genus: Eirenis
- Species: E. punctatolineatus

Binomial name
- Eirenis punctatolineatus (Boettger, 1892)

Subspecies
- Eirenis punctatolineatus condoni (Boulenger, 1920); Eirenis punctatolineatus punctatolineatus (Boettger, 1892)

= Eirenis punctatolineatus =

Species of snake

Eirenis punctatolineatus is a species of snake of the family Colubridae. It is commonly known as the dotted dwarf racer.

== Geographic range ==
The snake is found in the Middle East.
