= Eirenis occidentalis =

Scientific classification
- Kingdom: Animalia
- Phylum: Chordata
- Class: Reptilia
- Order: Squamata
- Suborder: Serpentes
- Family: Colubridae
- Genus: Eirenis
- Species: E. occidentalis

Binomial name
- Eirenis occidentalis Rajabizadeh, Nagy, Adriaens, Avci, Masroor, Schmidtler, Nazarov, Esmaeili & Christiaens, 2015

Species of snake

Eirenis occidentalis is a species of non-venomous snake in the family Colubridae. The species is found in Turkey through Iran.
