= Eirenis yassujicus =

Scientific classification
- Kingdom: Animalia
- Phylum: Chordata
- Class: Reptilia
- Order: Squamata
- Suborder: Serpentes
- Family: Colubridae
- Genus: Eirenis
- Species: E. yassujicus

Binomial name
- Eirenis yassujicus Fathinia, Rastegar-Pouyani, & Shafaeipour, 2019

Species of snake

Eirenis yassujicus is a species of non-venomous snake in the family Colubridae. The species is found in Iran.
