= Eirenis africanus =

Conservation status
- Data Deficient (IUCN 3.1)

Scientific classification
- Kingdom: Animalia
- Phylum: Chordata
- Class: Reptilia
- Order: Squamata
- Suborder: Serpentes
- Family: Colubridae
- Genus: Eirenis
- Species: E. africanus

Binomial name
- Eirenis africanus (Boulenger, 1914)

Species of snake

Eirenis africanus, the African dwarf snake, is a species of non-venomous snake in the family Colubridae. The species is found in Sudan, Eritrea, Ethiopia, and Djibouti.
