= Eirenis rechingeri =

Conservation status
- Data Deficient (IUCN 3.1)

Scientific classification
- Kingdom: Animalia
- Phylum: Chordata
- Class: Reptilia
- Order: Squamata
- Suborder: Serpentes
- Family: Colubridae
- Genus: Eirenis
- Species: E. rechingeri

Binomial name
- Eirenis rechingeri Eiselt, 1971
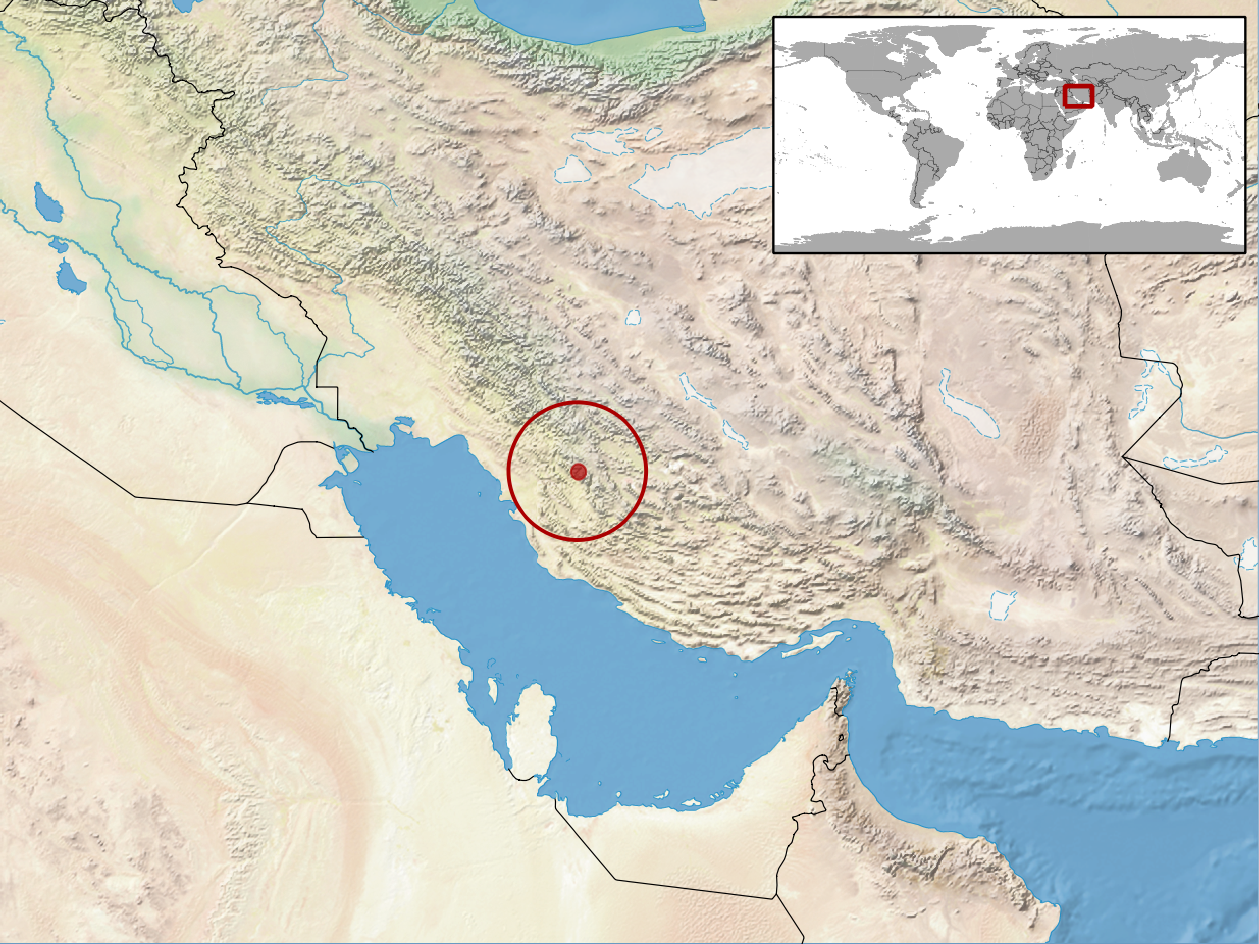

Species of snake

Eirenis rechingeri, Rechinger's dwarf racer, is a species of non-venomous snake in the family Colubridae. The species is found in Iran.
