= Eirenis thospitis =

Conservation status
- Data Deficient (IUCN 3.1)

Scientific classification
- Kingdom: Animalia
- Phylum: Chordata
- Class: Reptilia
- Order: Squamata
- Suborder: Serpentes
- Family: Colubridae
- Genus: Eirenis
- Species: E. thospitis

Binomial name
- Eirenis thospitis J.F. Schmidtler & Lanza, 1990
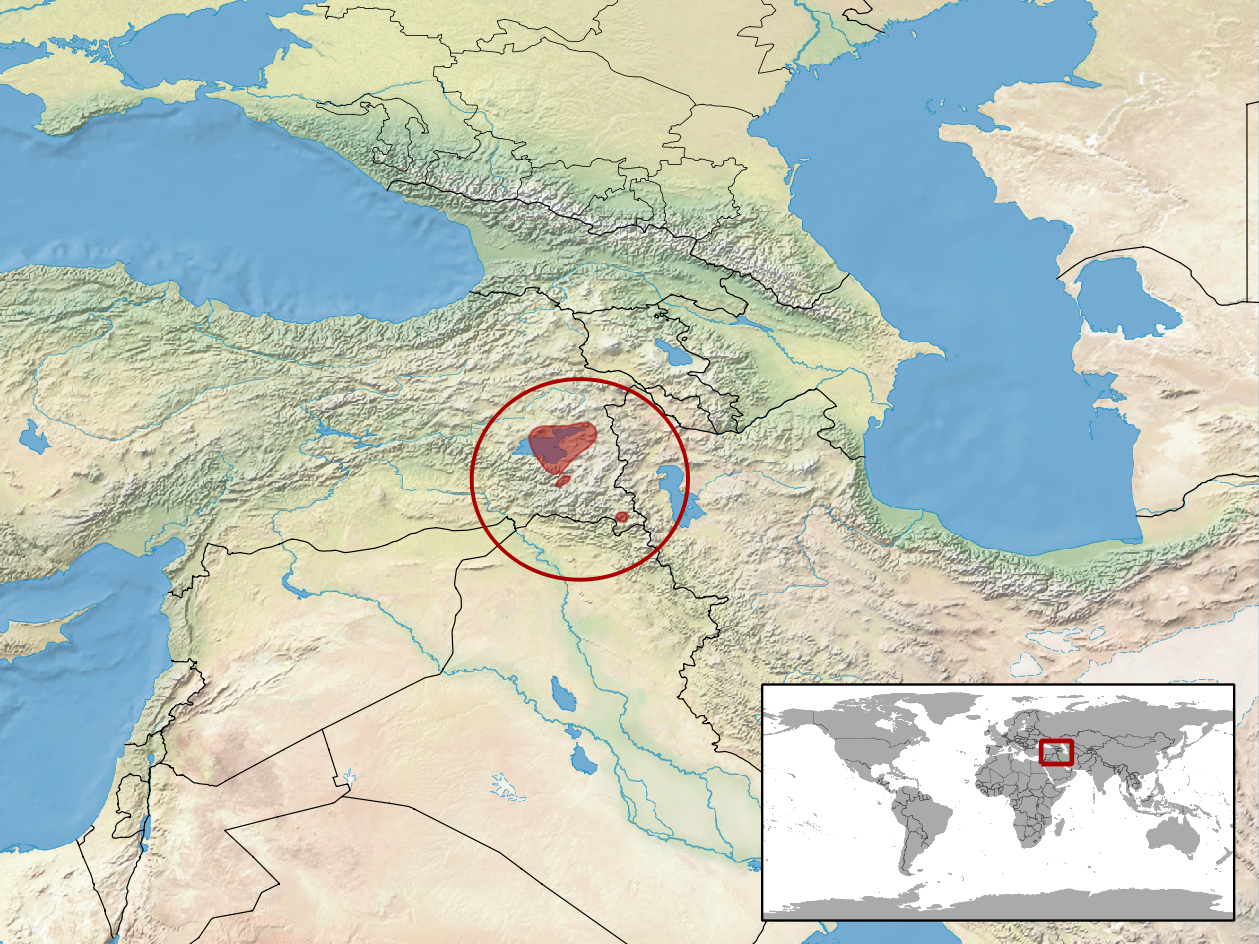

Species of snake

Eirenis thospitis is a species of non-venomous snake in the family Colubridae. The species is found in Turkey and Iran.
