= Eirenis aurolineatus =

Conservation status
- Least Concern (IUCN 3.1)

Scientific classification
- Kingdom: Animalia
- Phylum: Chordata
- Class: Reptilia
- Order: Squamata
- Suborder: Serpentes
- Family: Colubridae
- Genus: Eirenis
- Species: E. aurolineatus

Binomial name
- Eirenis aurolineatus (Venzmer, 1919)
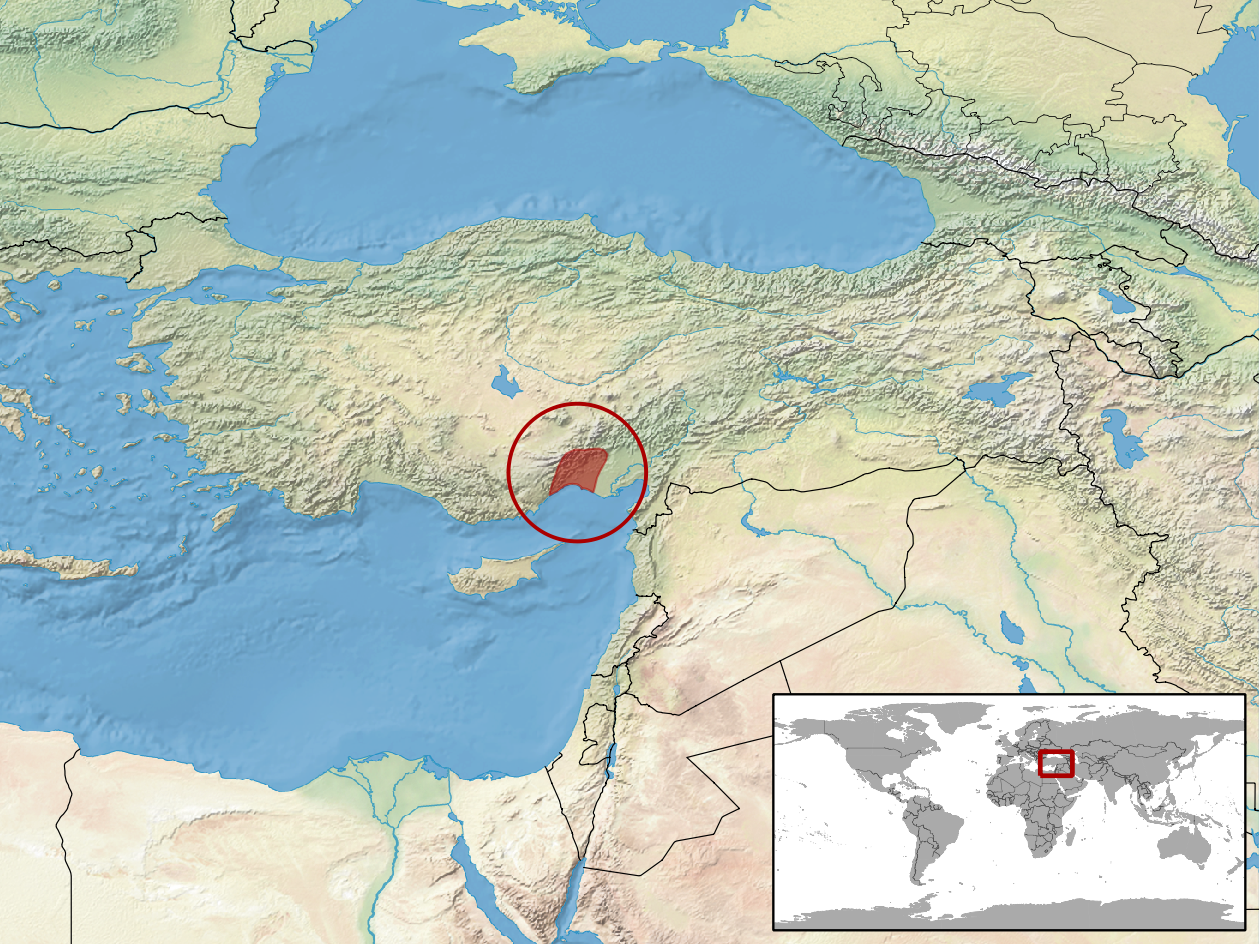

Species of snake

Eirenis aurolineatus is a species of non-venomous snake in the family Colubridae. The species is found in Turkey.
