= Eirenis coronelloides =

Scientific classification
- Domain: Eukaryota
- Kingdom: Animalia
- Phylum: Chordata
- Class: Reptilia
- Order: Squamata
- Suborder: Serpentes
- Family: Colubridae
- Genus: Eirenis
- Species: E. coronelloides

Binomial name
- Eirenis coronelloides (Jan, 1862)
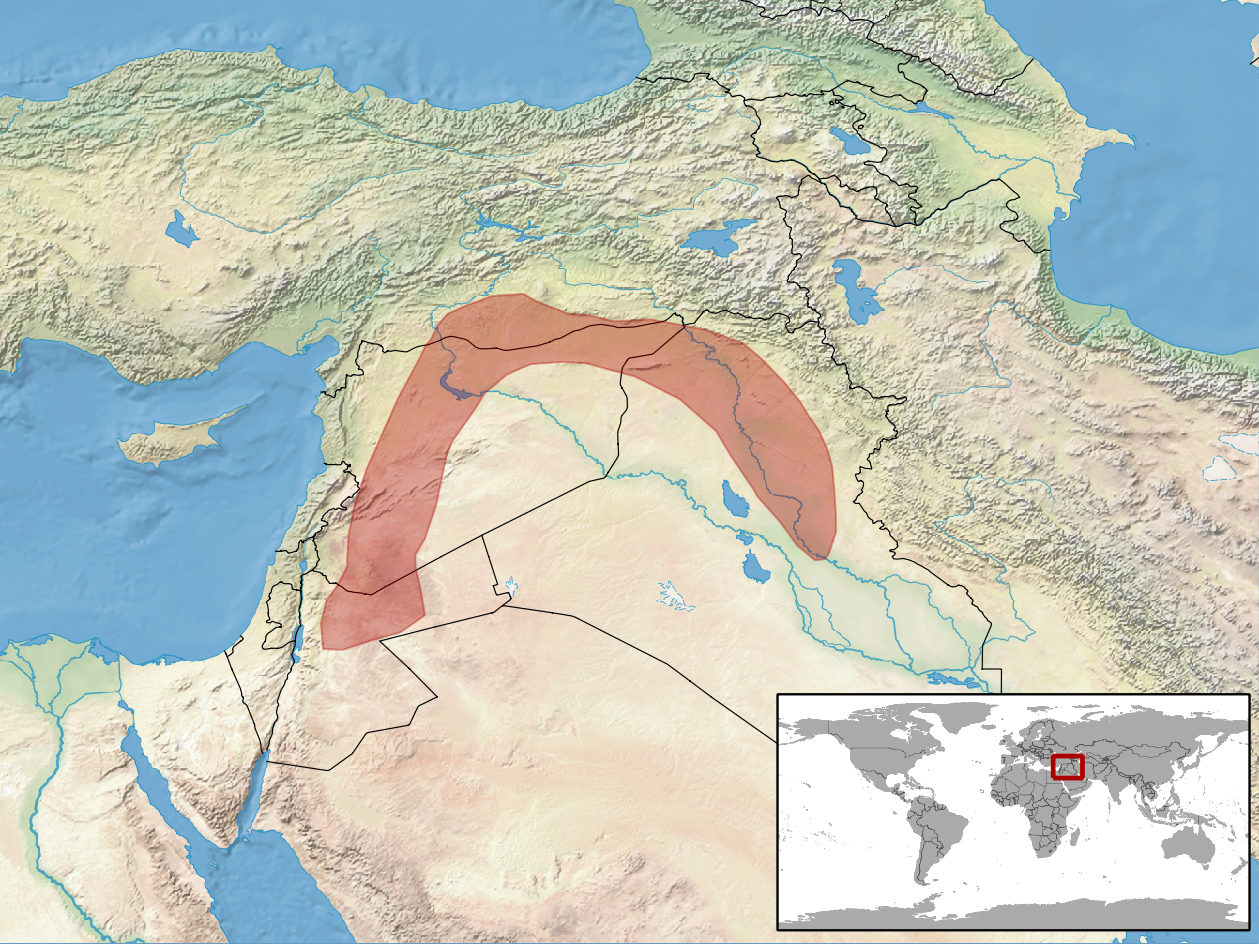

Non-venomous snake found in the Middle East

Eirenis coronelloides or (also known as Sinai dwarf racer) is a non-venomous snake found in the Middle East.

== Description ==
Eirenis coronelloides adults range from 17.5 to 25 cm in length.

Body light brown, with distinct dark crown on the head dark dorsal bars, characterized by dark crown, ventral stripe or both in all specimens examined from Turkey and some specimens from Jordan, Iraq, and Syria.

== Distribution ==
This species ranges from far-southeastern Turkey, northern and northeastern Iraq, and western and central Syria to northern Jordan.

It is found in scattered steppe vegetation on solid earth. It can be found under or between stones. It can be found in lightly cultivated agricultural areas.

== Reproduction ==
Oviparous, the female lays eggs.
