= Eirenis eiselti =

Conservation status
- Least Concern (IUCN 3.1)

Scientific classification
- Kingdom: Animalia
- Phylum: Chordata
- Class: Reptilia
- Order: Squamata
- Suborder: Serpentes
- Family: Colubridae
- Genus: Eirenis
- Species: E. eiselti

Binomial name
- Eirenis eiselti J.J. Schmidtler & J.F. Schmidtler, 1978
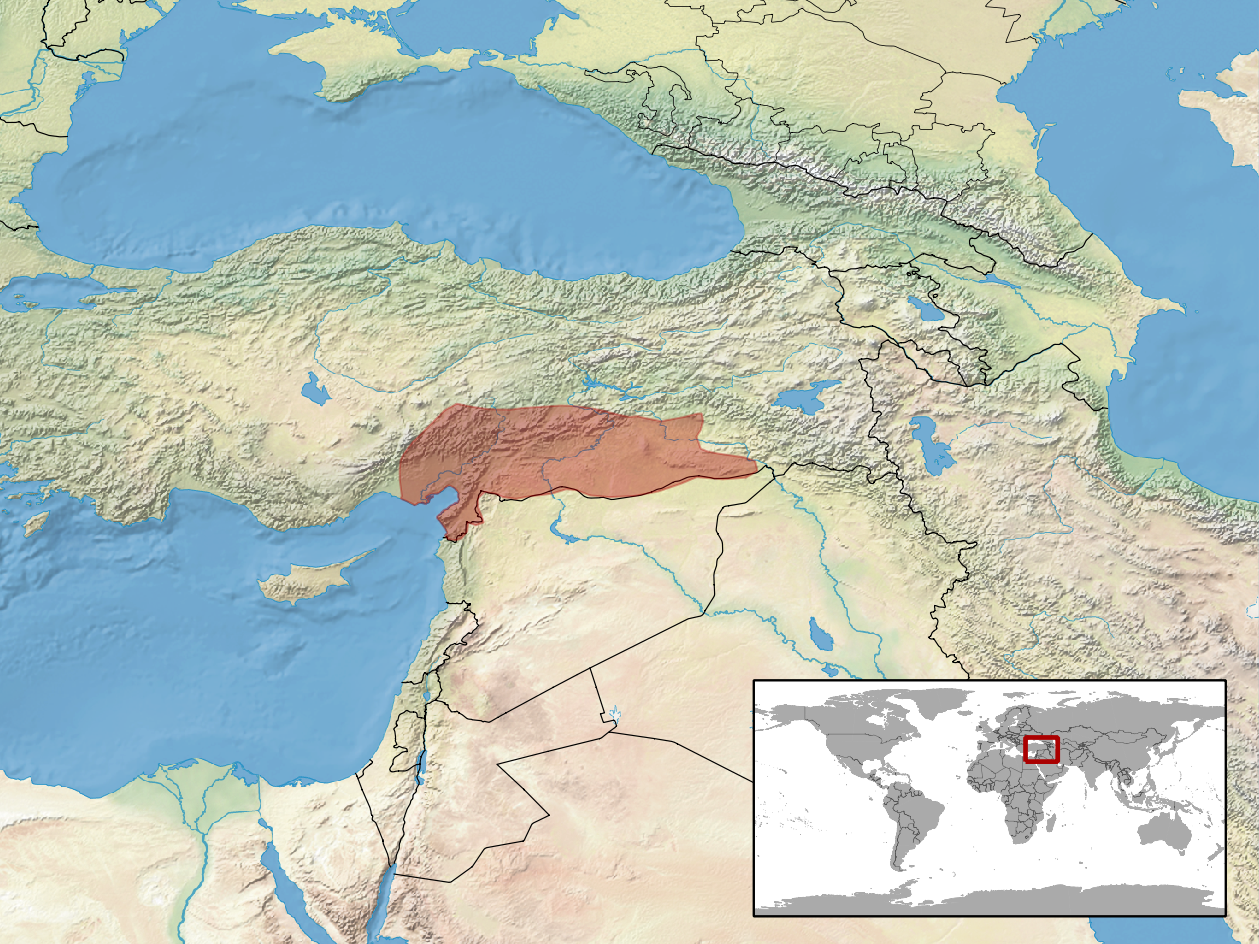

Species of snake

Eirenis eiselti, Eiselt's dwarf racer, is a species of non-venomous snake in the family Colubridae. The species is found in Turkey, Syria and Iraq.
