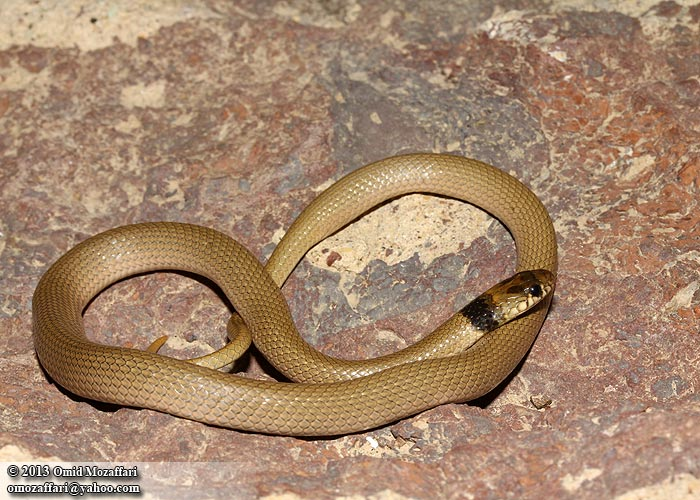

Conservation status
- Least Concern (IUCN 3.1)

Scientific classification
- Kingdom: Animalia
- Phylum: Chordata
- Class: Reptilia
- Order: Squamata
- Suborder: Serpentes
- Family: Colubridae
- Genus: Eirenis
- Species: E. collaris

Binomial name
- Eirenis collaris (Ménétries, 1832)
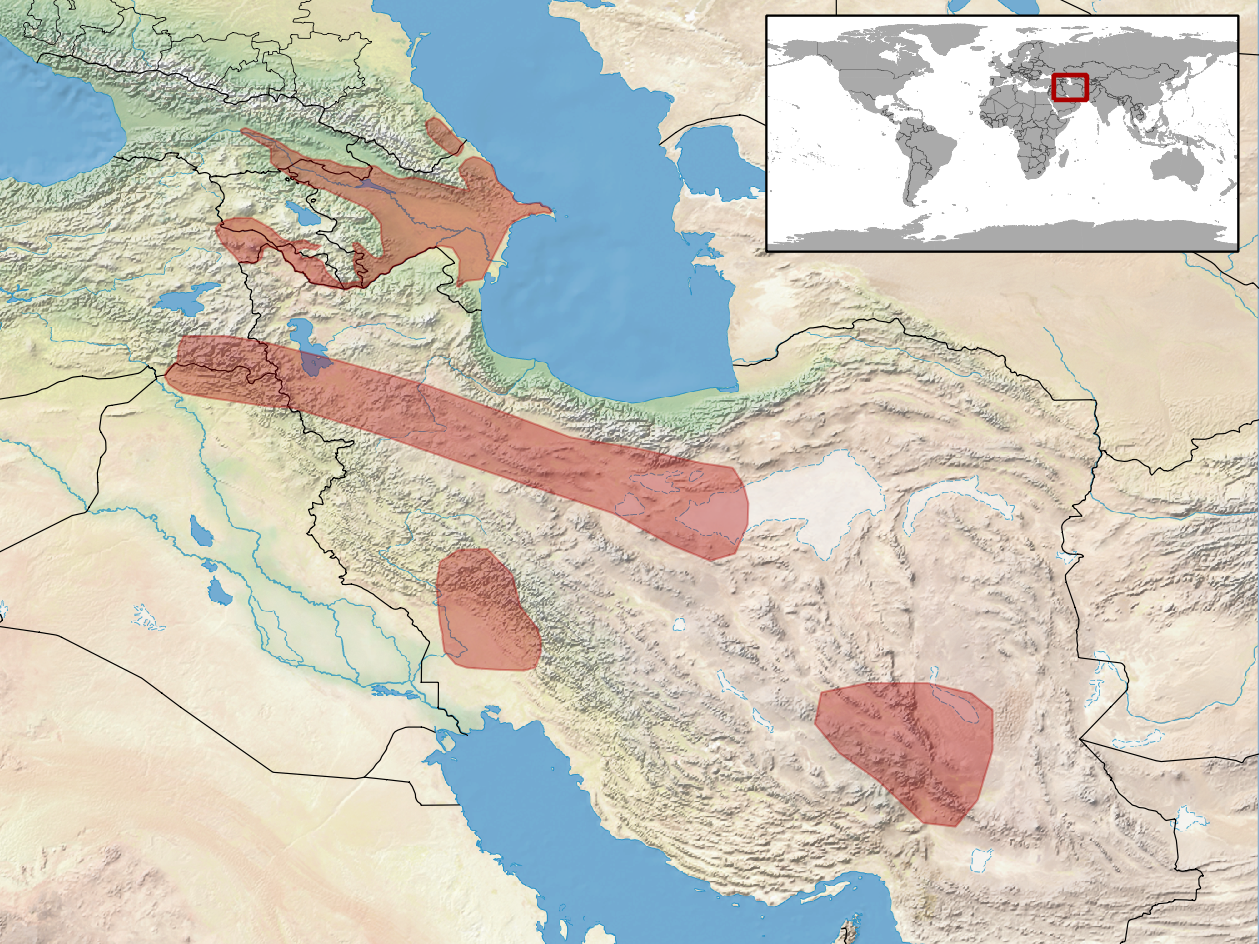

= Eirenis collaris =

Species of snake

Eirenis collaris, the collared dwarf racer or collared dwarf snake, is a species of non-venomous snake in the family Colubridae. The species is found in West Asia in eastern Turkey, the Caucasus (the range thus marginally extending into Europe), Iraq, and Iran. The Reptile Database also lists it from Lebanon and Bulgaria.

== History and taxonomy ==
The species was first described as Coluber collaris by Édouard Ménétries in 1832, who wrote "I caught this beautiful species under rocks near the Bèchebermak, not far from the Caspian Sea, in July". The type locality is Besh Barmag, Azerbaijan.

Jan and Sordelli published the first drawings of the specimens they collected in 1866. The nomenclature has been fairly stable.

== Anatomy and physiology ==
The collared dwarf racer is recognized by the 15 to 19 rows of unkeeled dorsal scales on its back. They are roughly 30 to 40 centimeters in size; in the original description, Ménétries wrote "Elle est de la grosseur d'une plume d'ote" ("It is the size of a goose feather").

The overall color is a golden brown (Ménétries called it "café-au-lait") with a dark brown or black collar encircling the neck.

=== Sexual dimorphism ===
In 2014, 33 specimens of collared dwarf racer were measured based on head and tail length to examine differences in sexual dimorphism. The results showed that male snakes had longer tails, whereas females has larger heads, presumably an adaptation allowing them to prey on larger organisms, which is useful for obtaining additional nutrients needed for reproduction.

== Distribution and habitat ==
The collared dwarf snake typically lives in dry, rocky plains with vegetation that thrives in arid conditions. They live in mountainous areas and are often found close to water.

== Behaviors and diet ==
The collared dwarf snake is a carnivorous species that devours its prey whole. They feed particularly on insects, as well as on spiders and small lizards. Snakes in the genus Eirenis are known to be agile hunters that will climb in order to find and feed on prey.
