= Eirenis nigrofasciatus =

Scientific classification
- Kingdom: Animalia
- Phylum: Chordata
- Class: Reptilia
- Order: Squamata
- Suborder: Serpentes
- Family: Colubridae
- Genus: Eirenis
- Species: E. nigrofasciatus

Binomial name
- Eirenis nigrofasciatus (Nikolsky, 1907)

Species of snake

Eirenis nigrofasciatus is a species of non-venomous snake in the family Colubridae. The species is found in Iran and Iraq.
