= Eirenis barani =

Conservation status
- Least Concern (IUCN 3.1)

Scientific classification
- Kingdom: Animalia
- Phylum: Chordata
- Class: Reptilia
- Order: Squamata
- Suborder: Serpentes
- Family: Colubridae
- Genus: Eirenis
- Species: E. barani

Binomial name
- Eirenis barani Schmidtler, 1988
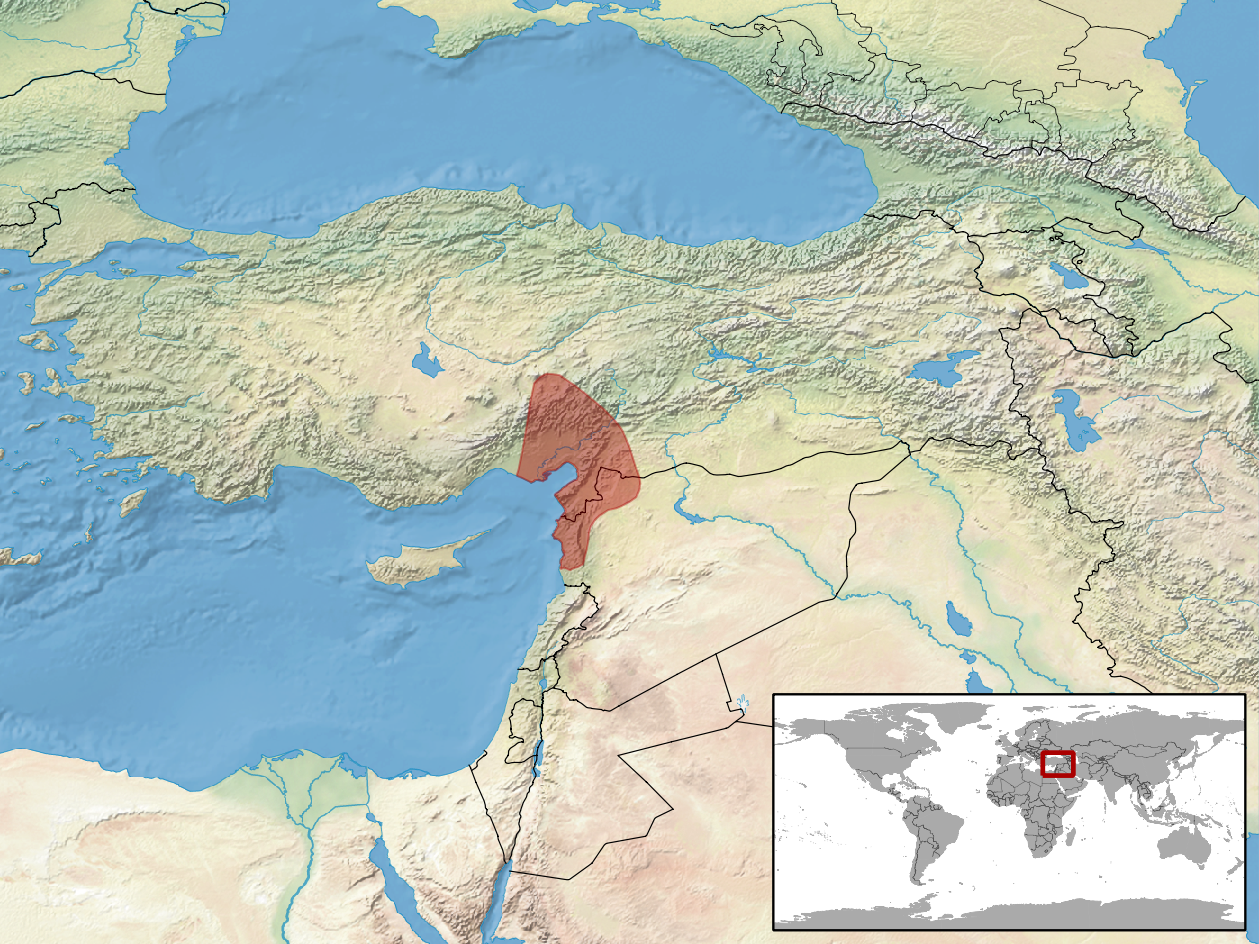

Species of snake

Eirenis barani, also known commonly as Baran's dwarf racer and the Baran dwarf racer, is a species of snake in the subfamily Colubrinae of the family Colubridae. The species is native to the Near East. There are two recognized subspecies.

== Etymology ==
The specific name, barani, is in honor of Turkish herpetologist İbrahim Baran.

The subspecific name, bischofforum (Latin, genitive, plural), is in honor of German herpetologist Wolfgang Bischoff and his wife Ulla Bischoff.

== Geographic range ==
Eirenis barani is found in southern Turkey and northwestern Syria.

== Habitat ==
The natural habitats of Eirenis barani are Mediterranean-type shrubby vegetation and rocky areas, at altitudes from sea level to 1,700 m (5,600 ft).

== Description ==
The holotype of Eirenis barani has a snout-to-vent length (SVL) of 228 mm (9.0 in) and a tail length of 78 mm (3.1 in). The dorsal scales are smooth, and are arranged in 17 rows at midbody.

== Reproduction ==
Eirenis barani is oviparous.

== Subspecies ==
Two subspecies are recognized as being valid, including the nominotypical subspecies.

- Eirenis barani barani Schmidtler, 1988
- Eirenis barani bischofforum Schmidtler, 1997
