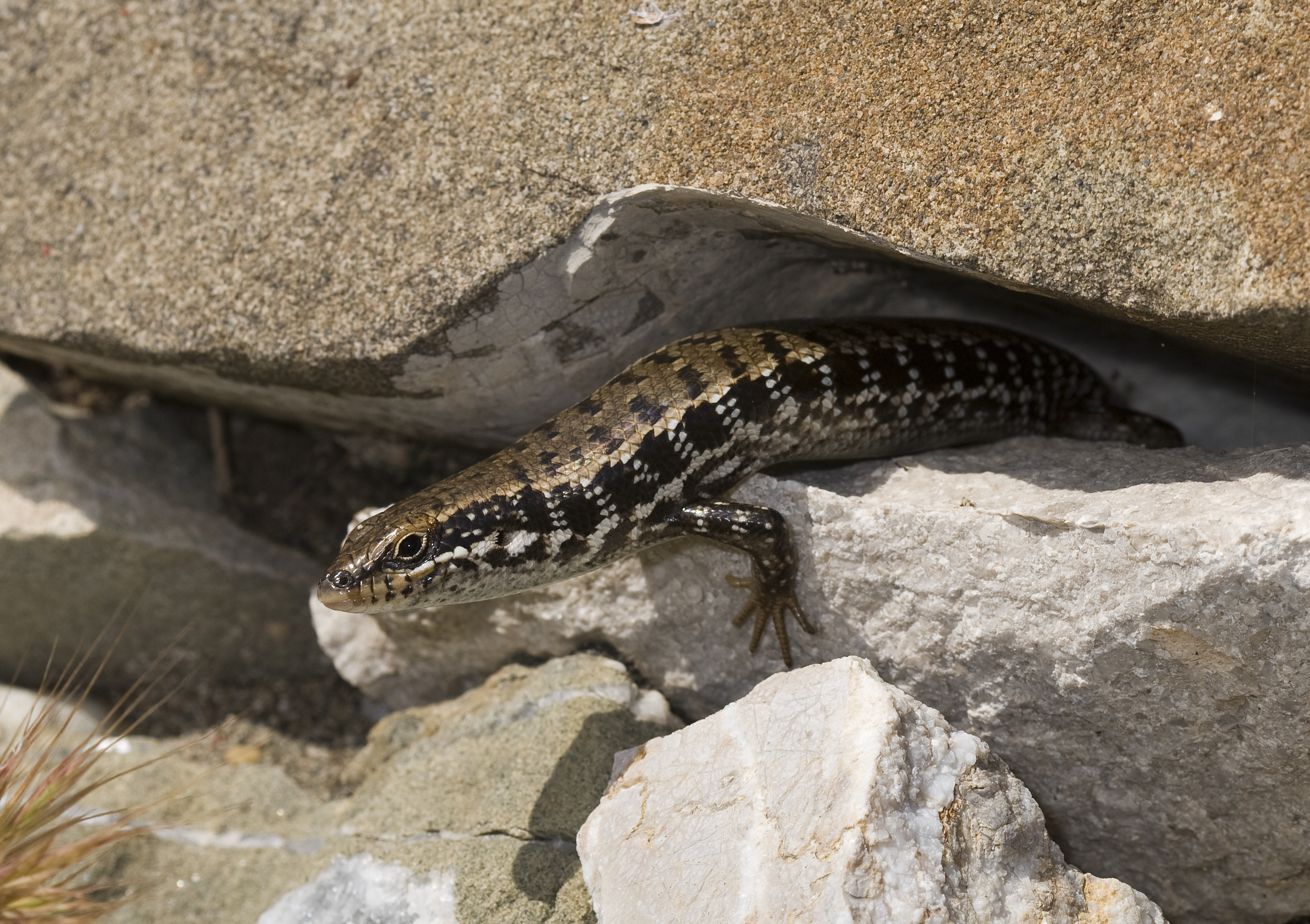
- Heremites auratus

Scientific classification
- Domain: Eukaryota
- Kingdom: Animalia
- Phylum: Chordata
- Class: Reptilia
- Order: Squamata
- Family: Scincidae
- Subfamily: Mabuyinae
- Genus: Heremites; Gray, 1845

Species
- 3 sp., see text

= Heremites =

Genus of lizards

Heremites is a genus of skinks.

== Species ==
The following 3 species, listed alphabetically by specific name, are recognized as being valid:

- Heremites auratus (Linnaeus, 1758) – levant skink, golden grass mabuya, golden grass skink
- Heremites septemtaeniatus (Reuss, 1834) – golden grass mabuya, southern grass skink
- Heremites vittatus (Olivier, 1804) – bridled mabuya, bridled skink

Nota bene: A binomial authority in parentheses indicates that the species was originally described in a genus other than Heremites.
