= Eirenis kermanensis =

Scientific classification
- Kingdom: Animalia
- Phylum: Chordata
- Class: Reptilia
- Order: Squamata
- Suborder: Serpentes
- Family: Colubridae
- Genus: Eirenis
- Species: E. kermanensis

Binomial name
- Eirenis kermanensis Rajabizadeh, J. F. Schmidtler, Orlov, & Soleimani 2012

Species of snake

Eirenis kermanensis is a species of non-venomous snake in the family Colubridae. The species is found in Iran.
