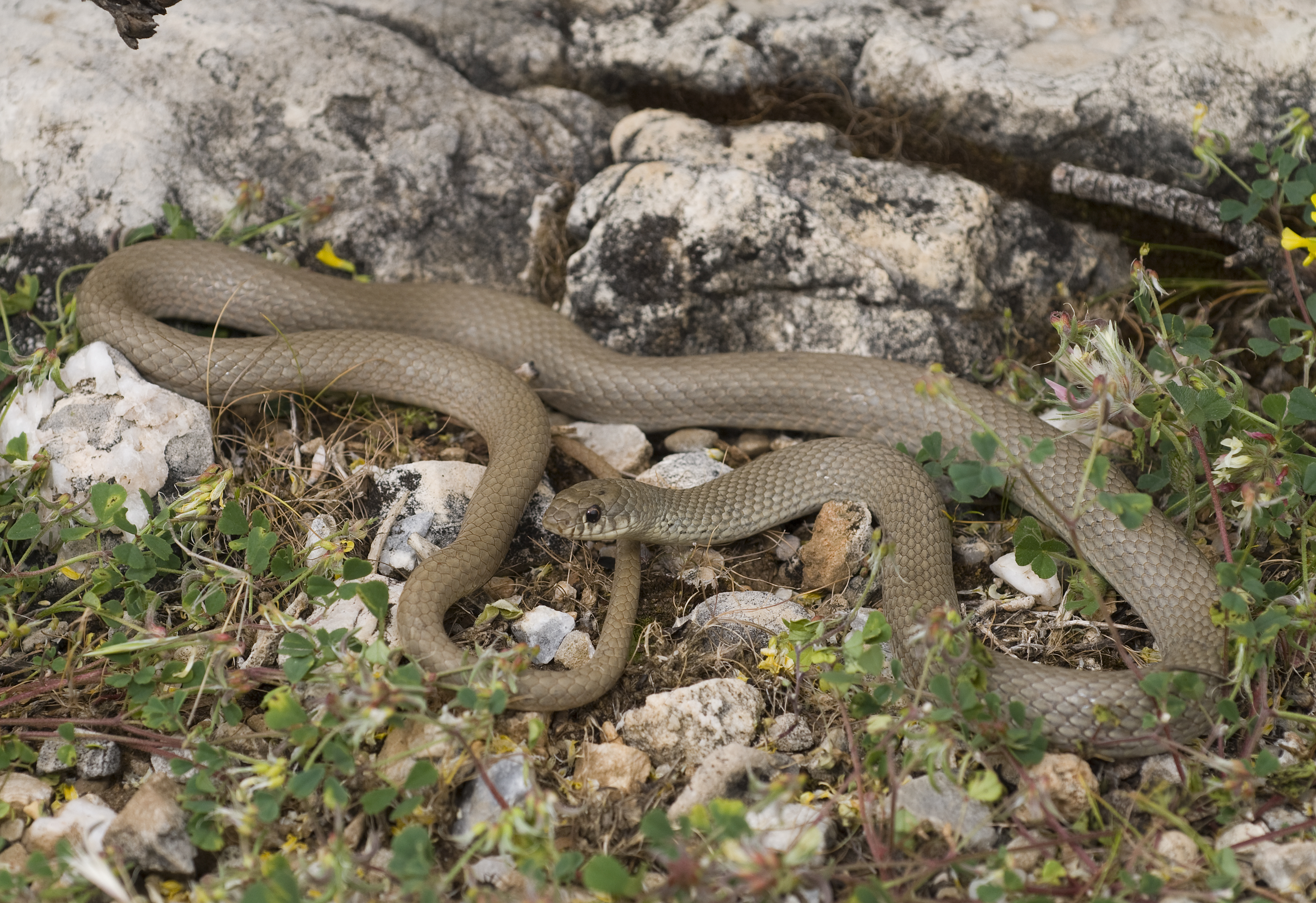
- Eirenis modestus

Scientific classification
- Kingdom: Animalia
- Phylum: Chordata
- Class: Reptilia
- Order: Squamata
- Suborder: Serpentes
- Family: Colubridae
- Subfamily: Colubrinae
- Genus: Eirenis; Jan, 1863

= Eirenis =

Genus of snakes

Eirenis is a genus of Old World snakes in the family Colubridae.

== Species ==
The genus Eirenis contains the following 23 described species:

- Eirenis africanus (Boulenger, 1914) - African dwarf snake
- Eirenis aurolineatus (Venzmer, 1919)
- Eirenis barani J.F. Schmidtler, 1988 – Baran's dwarf racer
- Eirenis collaris (Ménétries, 1832) – collared dwarf racer
- Eirenis coronella (Schlegel, 1837) – crowned dwarf racer
- Eirenis coronelloides (Jan, 1862) - Sinai dwarf racer
- Eirenis decemlineatus (A.M.C. Duméril, Bibron & A.H.A. Duméril, 1854) - narrow-striped dwarf snake
- Eirenis eiselti J.J. Schmidtler & J.F. Schmidtler, 1978 – Eiselt's dwarf racer
- Eirenis hakkariensis J.F. Schmidtler & Eiselt, 1991
- Eirenis kermanensis Rajabizadeh et al., 2012
- Eirenis levantinus J.F. Schmidtler, 1993
- Eirenis lineomaculatus K.P. Schmidt, 1939
- Eirenis medus (Chernov, 1940)
- Eirenis modestus (Martin, 1838) – Asia Minor dwarf racer
- Eirenis nigrofasciatus Nikolsky, 1907
- Eirenis occidentalis Rajabizadeh et al., 2015
- Eirenis persicus (Anderson, 1872) - dark-headed dwarf racer
- Eirenis punctatolineatus (Boettger, 1892) – dotted dwarf racer
- Eirenis rafsanjanicus Akbarpour, N. Rastegar-Pouyani, Fathinia & E. Rastegar-Pouyani, 2020
- Eirenis rechingeri Eiselt, 1971
- Eirenis rothii Jan, 1863 – Roth's dwarf racer
- Eirenis thospitis J.F. Schmidtler & Lanza, 1990
- Eirenis yassujicus Fathinia, E. Rastegar-Pouyani & Shafaeipour, 2019

Nota bene: A binomial authority in parentheses indicates that the species was originally described in a genus other than Eirenis.

== Distribution ==
Some of the species within this genus have a narrow geographic distribution; for example, Eirenis mcmahoni occurs only within a single ecoregion along the Afghanistan/Pakistan border, which region is known as the Registan-North Pakistan sandy desert.
