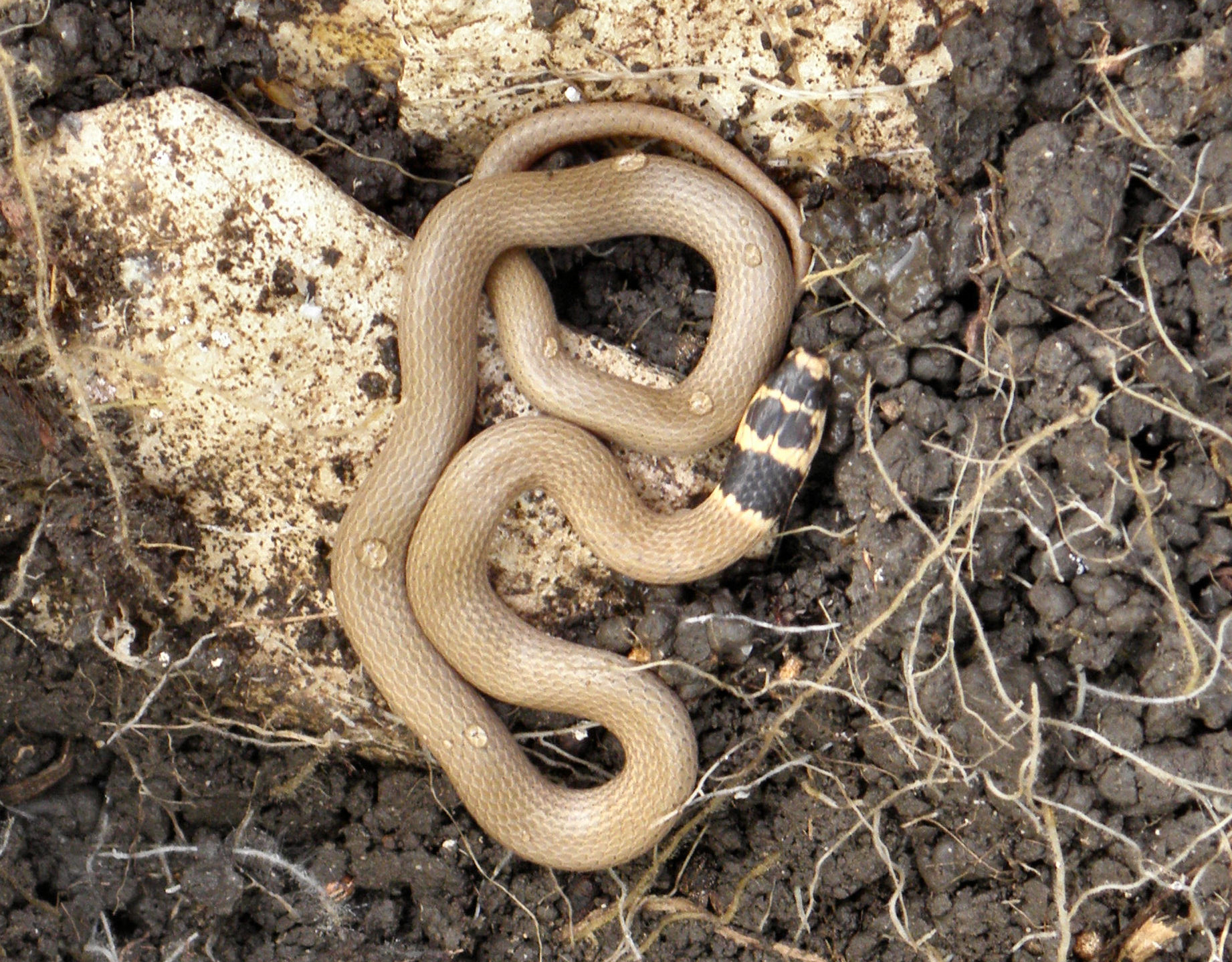
- Eirenis rothii in Israel

Conservation status
- Least Concern (IUCN 3.1)

Scientific classification
- Kingdom: Animalia
- Phylum: Chordata
- Class: Reptilia
- Order: Squamata
- Suborder: Serpentes
- Family: Colubridae
- Genus: Eirenis
- Species: E. rothii

Binomial name
- Eirenis rothii Jan, 1863

Synonyms
- Eirenis rothii Jan, 1863; Ablabes modestus Günther, 1864; Ablabes rothi — Boettger, 1880; Homalosoma collaris Peracca, 1894; Contia rothii — Boulenger GA, 1894; Eirenis rothi — Baran, 1978; Eirenis (Pediophis) rothi — Nagy, 2004; Eirenis rothii — Wallach, K. Williams & Boundy, 2014

= Eirenis rothii =

Species of snake

Eirenis rothii, known commonly as Roth's dwarf racer, is a species of snake in the family Colubridae. The species is endemic to the Middle East.

== Etymology ==
The specific name, rothii, is in honor of German naturalist Johannes Rudolph Roth (1814–1858).

== Geographic range ==
E. rothii is found in Israel, Jordan, Lebanon, Syria, and Turkey. It may also occur in Iraq.

== Habitat ==
The natural habitat of E. rothii is shrubland, at altitudes of 0–1,500 m (0–4,921 ft).

== Description ==
A small snake, E. rothii may attain a total length of 30 cm (12 in), which includes a tail 5.5 cm (2.2 in) long. The top of the head and neck are black, with three or four transverse yellow lines. The black on the neck descends to include the sides of the throat. The body is brownish yellow dorsally, and white ventrally. The dorsal scales are in 15 rows at midbody.

== Reproduction ==
E. rothii is oviparous.
