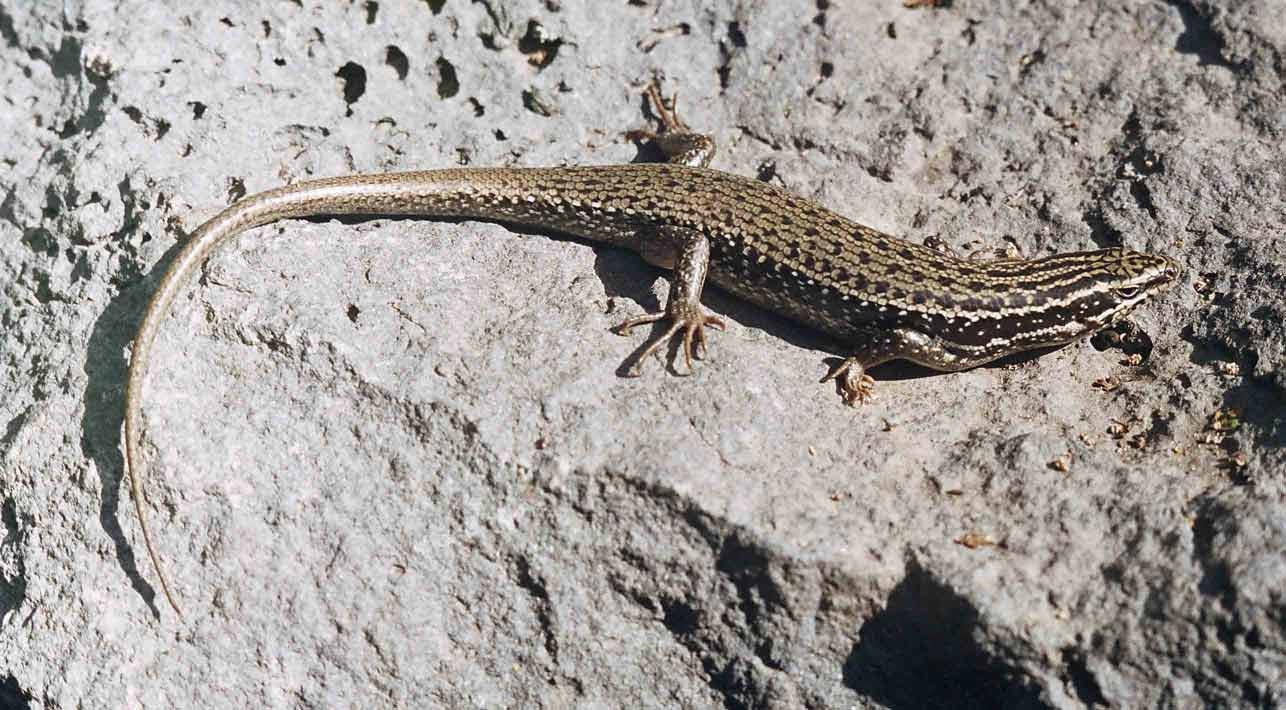

Conservation status
- Least Concern (IUCN 3.1)

Scientific classification
- Kingdom: Animalia
- Phylum: Chordata
- Class: Reptilia
- Order: Squamata
- Suborder: Scinciformata
- Infraorder: Scincomorpha
- Family: Scincidae
- Genus: Heremites
- Species: H. septemtaeniatus

Binomial name
- Heremites septemtaeniatus (Reuss, 1834)

= Heremites septemtaeniatus =

Species of lizard

The golden grass mabuya or southern grass skink (Heremites septemtaeniatus) is a species of skink found in the Middle East.
