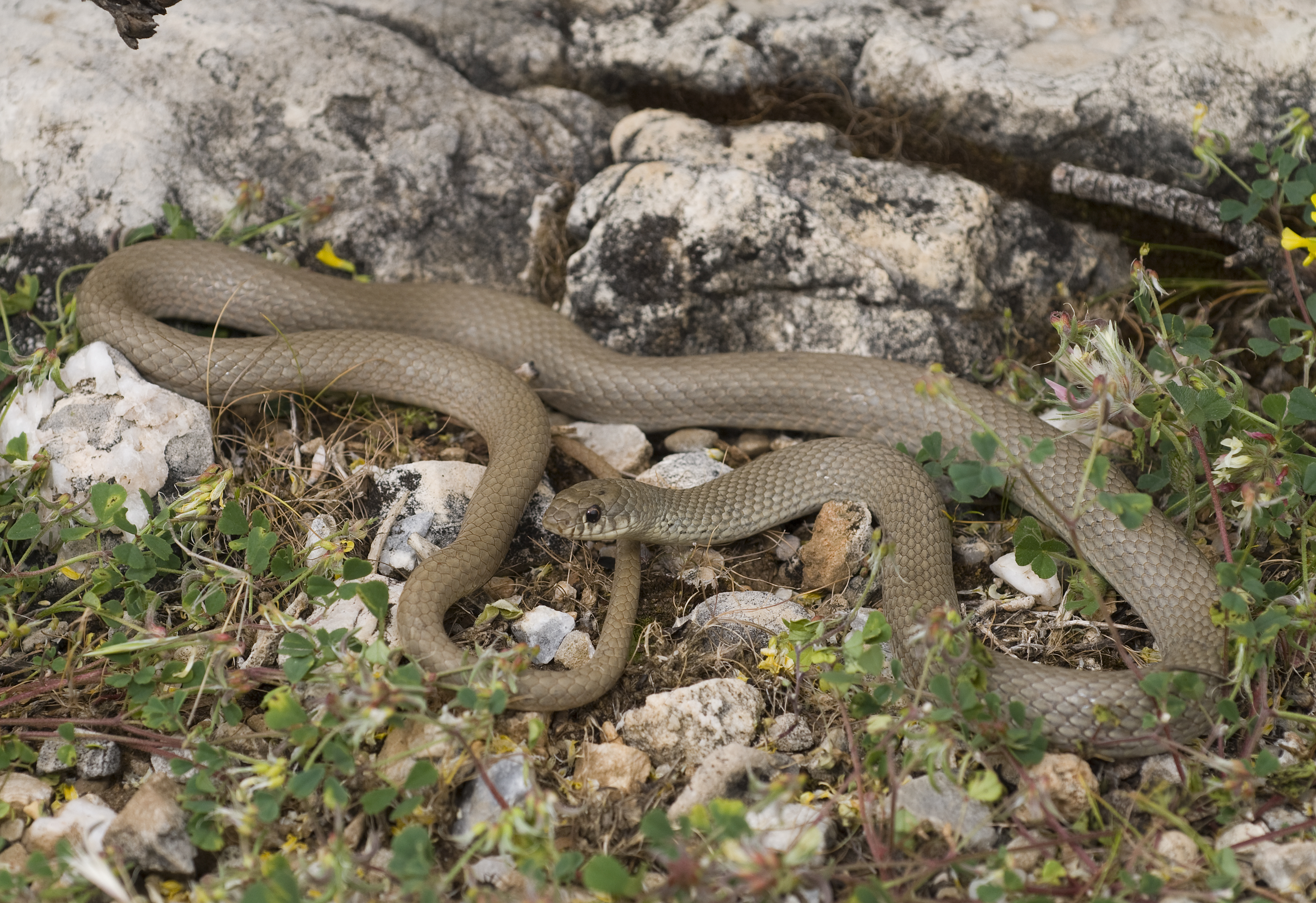
- At Samos, Greece

Conservation status
- Least Concern (IUCN 3.1)

Scientific classification
- Kingdom: Animalia
- Phylum: Chordata
- Class: Reptilia
- Order: Squamata
- Suborder: Serpentes
- Family: Colubridae
- Genus: Eirenis
- Species: E. modestus

Binomial name
- Eirenis modestus (Martin, 1838)

Synonyms
- Coluber nigricollis Dvigubsky, 1832; Contia modesta (Martin, 1838); Coronella modesta Martin, 1838

= Eirenis modestus =

Species of snake

Eirenis modestus, commonly known as ring-headed dwarf snake or simply the Asia Minor dwarf racer, is a non-venomous species of snake in the Colubridae family. It is native to several Greek islands, Turkey, Syria, Armenia, Azerbaijan, Israel, Georgia and southwestern parts of the Russian Federation.

== Description ==
The ring-headed dwarf snake is a pencil-thin species that grows to a maximum length of 60 cm (24 in) but most adults are considerably smaller than this. The skin is smooth and the edges of the scales are slightly darker than the centres. The upper surface of the body is a uniform yellowish-brown, greyish-brown or reddish-brown colour and the underparts are glossy white. The top of the head has a large black blotch inside which are either two whitish spots or a pale W-shaped mark. Round the neck is a crescent-shaped band of dark blotches separated from the head by a pale band.

== Subspecies ==
Currently, three subspecies are recognized, namely Eirenis modestus modestus (Martin 1838), E. m. semimaculatus (Boettger 1876) from central and western Turkey (Anatolia), and E. m. cilicius (Schmidtler 1993) from southern Turkey.

== Distribution and habitat ==
The ring-headed dwarf snake is native to the Greek Mediterranean islands of Lesbos, Chios, Samos, Fournoi, Kasos, Karpathos, Kalymnos, Leros, Symi and Megisti and most of Turkey. Its range extends eastwards into the Caucasus Mountains, eastern Georgia, Armenia and Azerbaijan. Its natural habitats are dry shrubby vegetation, cultivated fields, fallow areas and dry open woodland.

== Behaviour ==
During the day the ring-headed dwarf snake shelters under stones or in crevices, and several snakes may share the same hiding place. It emerges at twilight to hunt for spiders, insects, centipedes, scorpions and small lizards. Breeding takes place in summer when the female lays a clutch of three to eight relatively large eggs. The hatchlings are up to about 12 cm (4.7 in) long.

== Status ==
The ring-headed dwarf snake has a wide range and is presumed to have a large total population. It seems to be an adaptable species able to tolerate a range of different habitat types, and no particular threats have been identified and for these reasons, the IUCN has listed it as being of "Least Concern".
