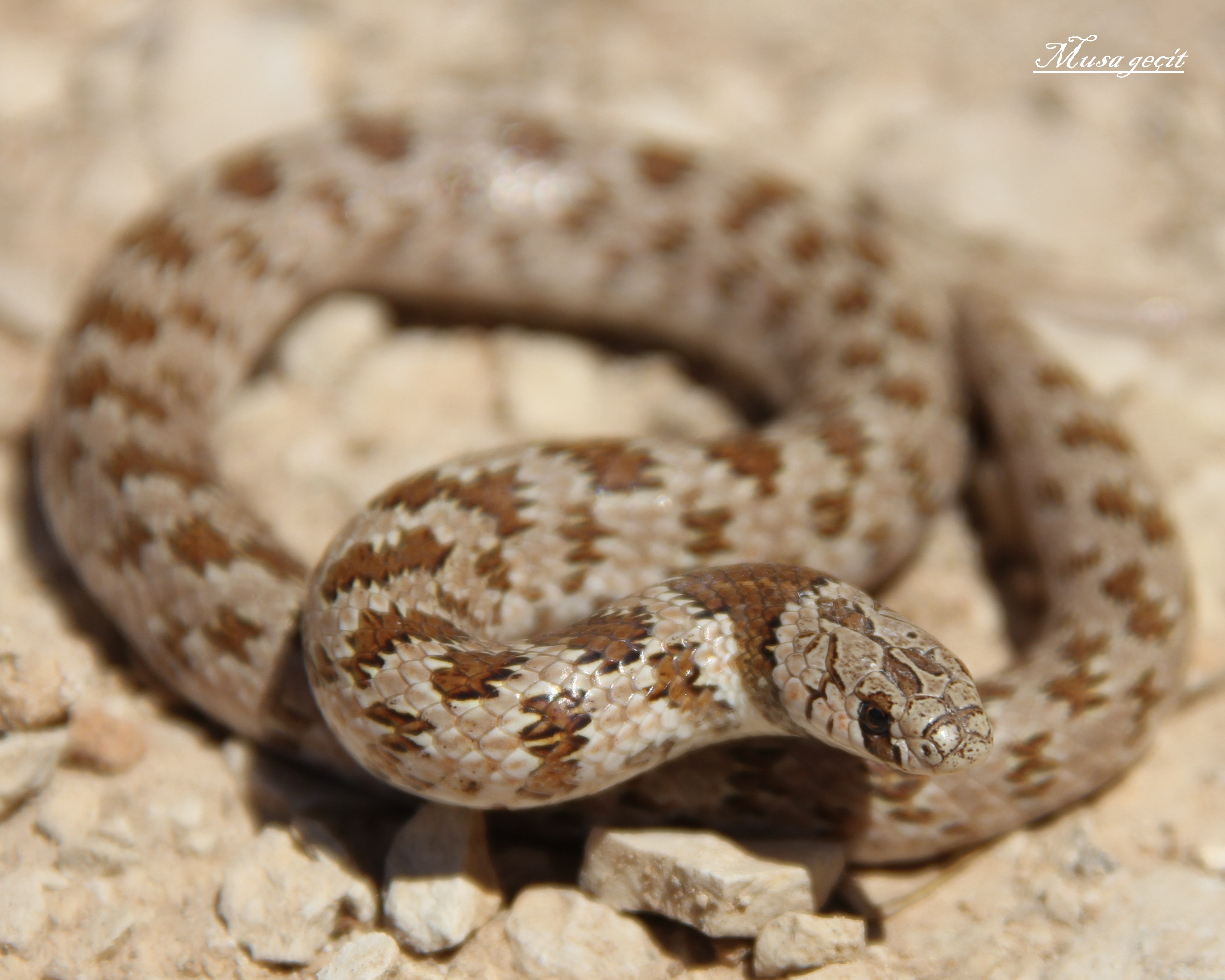

Conservation status
- Least Concern (IUCN 3.1)

Scientific classification
- Kingdom: Animalia
- Phylum: Chordata
- Class: Reptilia
- Order: Squamata
- Suborder: Serpentes
- Family: Colubridae
- Genus: Eirenis
- Species: E. lineomaculatus

Binomial name
- Eirenis lineomaculatus Schmidt, 1939
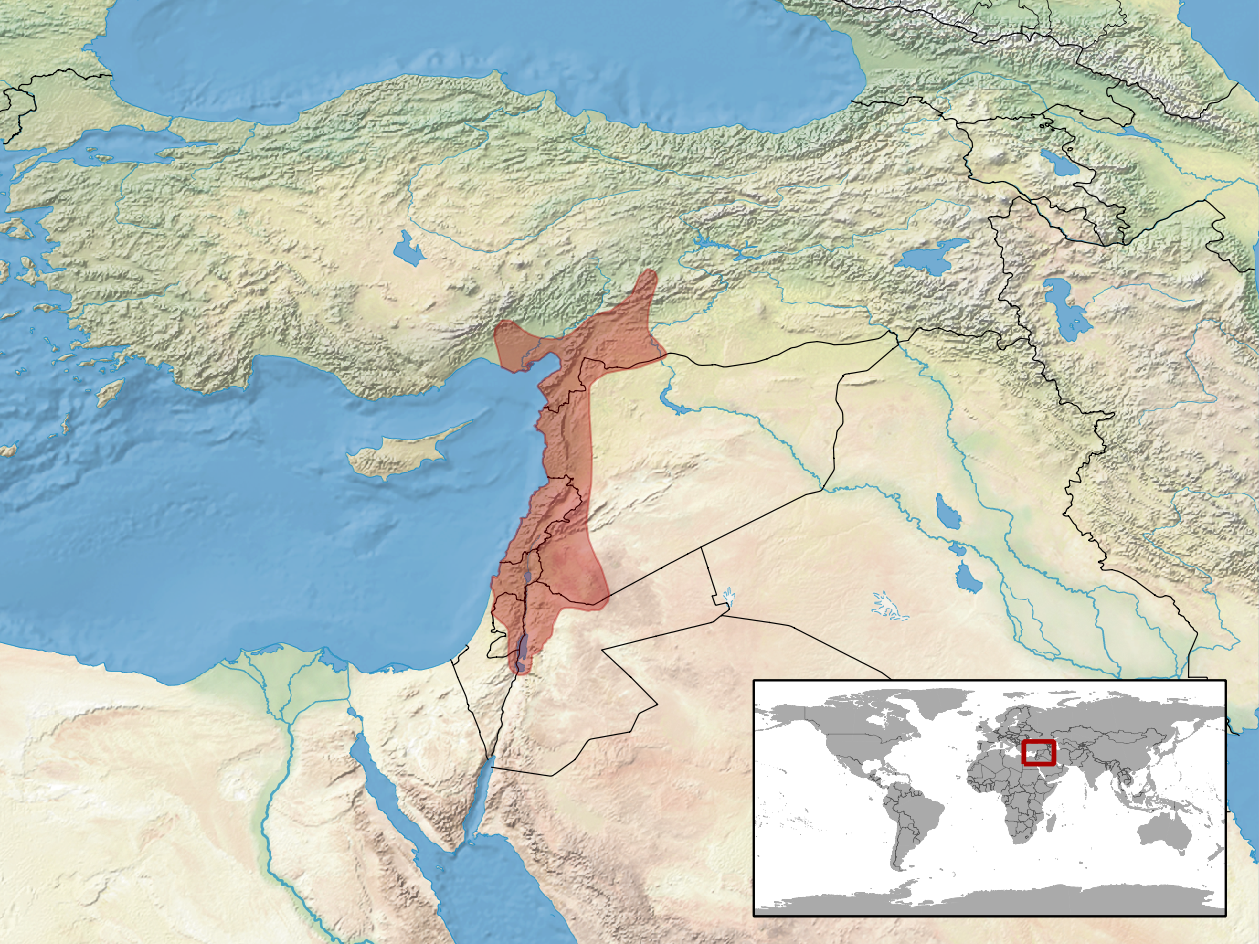

= Eirenis lineomaculatus =

Species of snake

Eirenis lineomaculatus is a species of snake in the family Colubridae.

It is found in the levant, ,

Its natural habitats are Mediterranean-type shrubby vegetation, rocky areas, and rural gardens.

It is threatened by habitat loss.
