= Eirenis coronella =

Conservation status
- Least Concern (IUCN 3.1)

Scientific classification
- Kingdom: Animalia
- Phylum: Chordata
- Class: Reptilia
- Order: Squamata
- Suborder: Serpentes
- Family: Colubridae
- Genus: Eirenis
- Species: E. coronella

Binomial name
- Eirenis coronella (Schlegel, 1837)
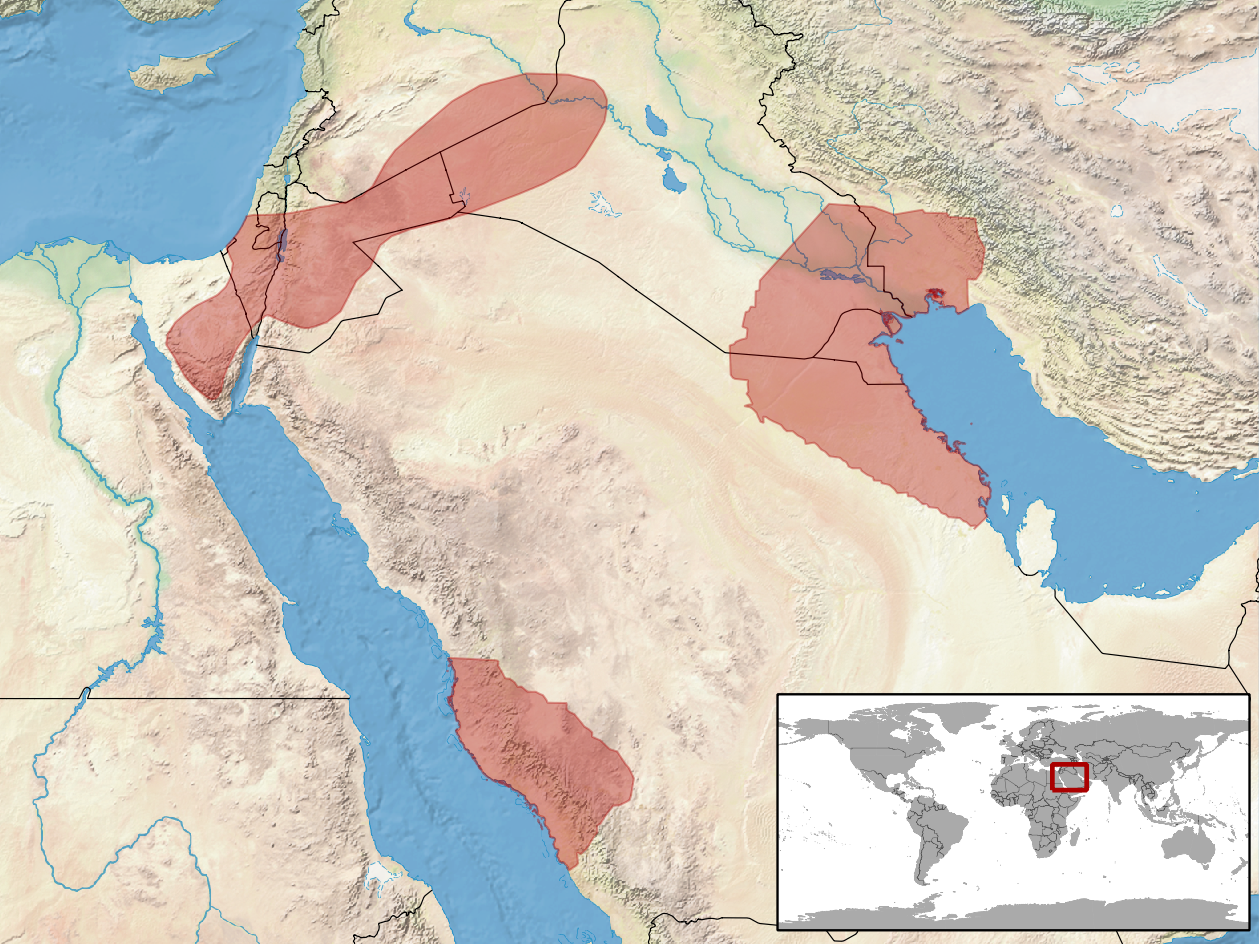

Species of snake

Eirenis coronella or crowned dwarf racer, is a non-venomous snake found in the Near and Middle East.

== Description ==
Eirenis coronella adults range from 25 to 30 cm in length. The head is a little wider than the body, although the body is a little bulky and has smooth dorsal scales. The tail is distinctly narrower than the main body and constitutes about 20% of the total length. The dorsal surface is usually pale brown to grey, with darker bands. They have a thick brown crescent-shaped collar, and the underside is yellowish to white with round brown spots.

== Distribution ==
The snake is found in Southern Turkey, Jordan, Lebanon, Syria, Egypt (Sinai), Iraq, Western Iran, Northern Saudi Arabia, and Israel.

This species is found in arid, sparsely vegetated mountainous and hilly areas on hard and rocky soils. It can be found between rocks and on the banks of dry wadis. They are often found in agricultural land and other man made habitats (Egan 2007). It is not known from agricultural areas.

== Reproduction ==
Oviparous, the female lays between three and five eggs in a clutch.
