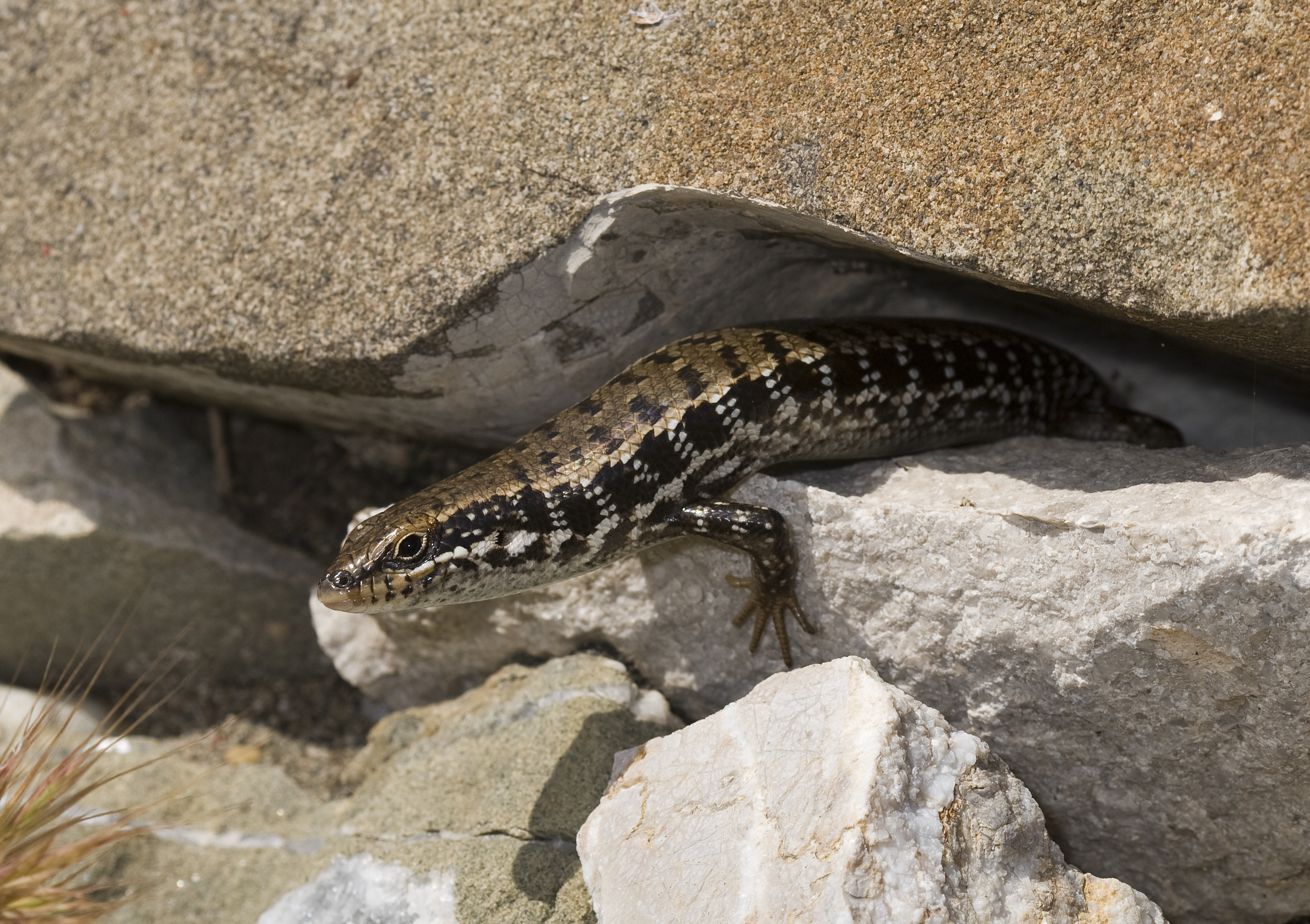

Conservation status
- Least Concern (IUCN 3.1)

Scientific classification
- Kingdom: Animalia
- Phylum: Chordata
- Class: Reptilia
- Order: Squamata
- Suborder: Scinciformata
- Infraorder: Scincomorpha
- Superfamily: Scincoidea
- Family: Scincidae
- Subfamily: Mabuyinae
- Genus: Heremites
- Species: H. auratus

Binomial name
- Heremites auratus (L., 1758)

Synonyms
- Lacerta aurata Linnaeus, 1758; Euprepis auratus (Linnaeus, 1758); Mabuya aurata (Linnaeus, 1758); Trachylepis aurata (Bauer 2003)

= Heremites auratus =

Species of lizard

Heremites auratus, the Levant skink, golden grass mabuya, or golden grass skink, is a species of skink. It is found in Greece and Turkey, and possibly much more widely in Asia and even north-eastern Africa.
