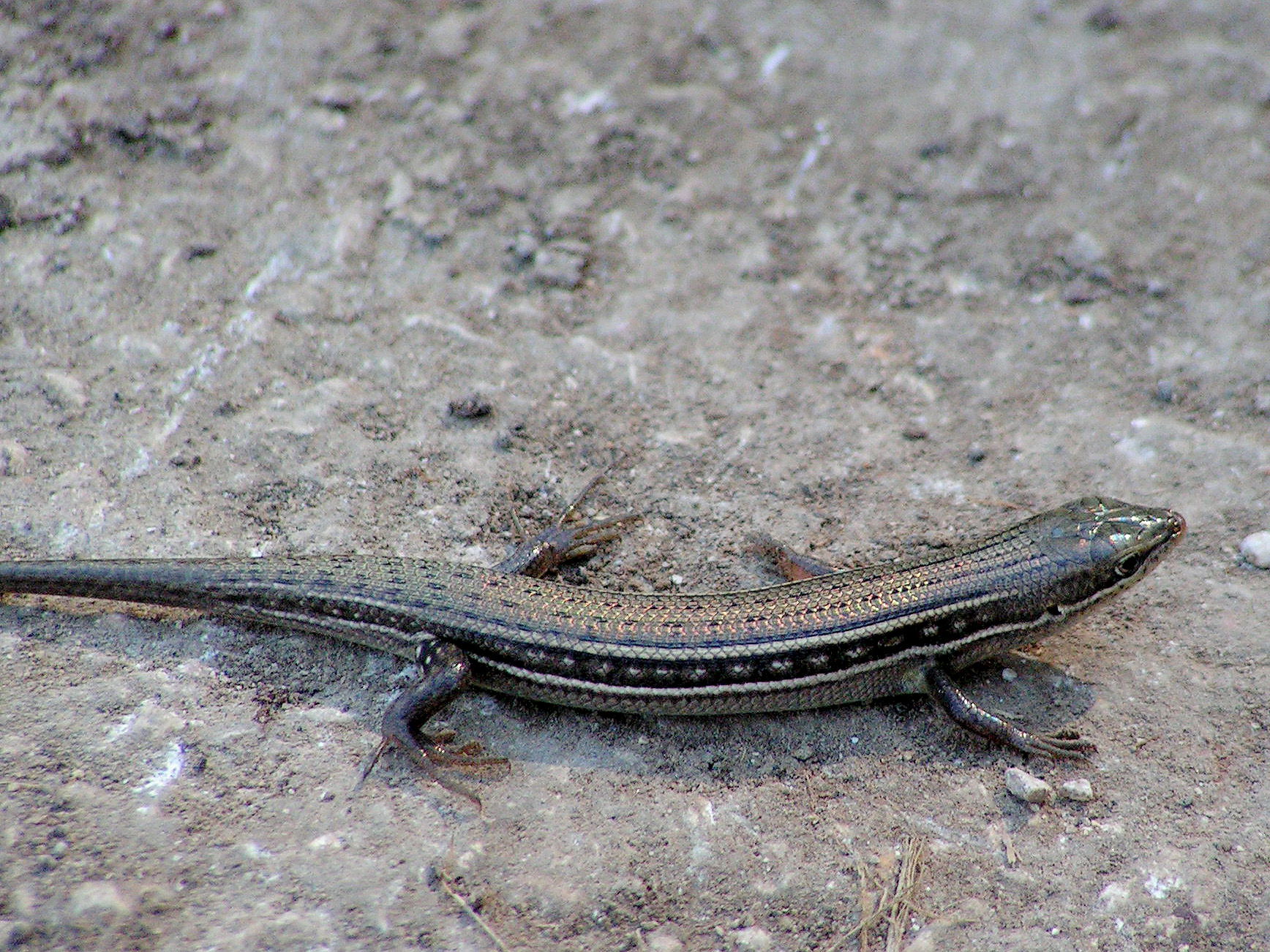

Conservation status
- Least Concern (IUCN 3.1)

Scientific classification
- Kingdom: Animalia
- Phylum: Chordata
- Class: Reptilia
- Order: Squamata
- Suborder: Scinciformata
- Infraorder: Scincomorpha
- Family: Scincidae
- Genus: Heremites
- Species: H. vittatus

Binomial name
- Heremites vittatus (Olivier, 1804)
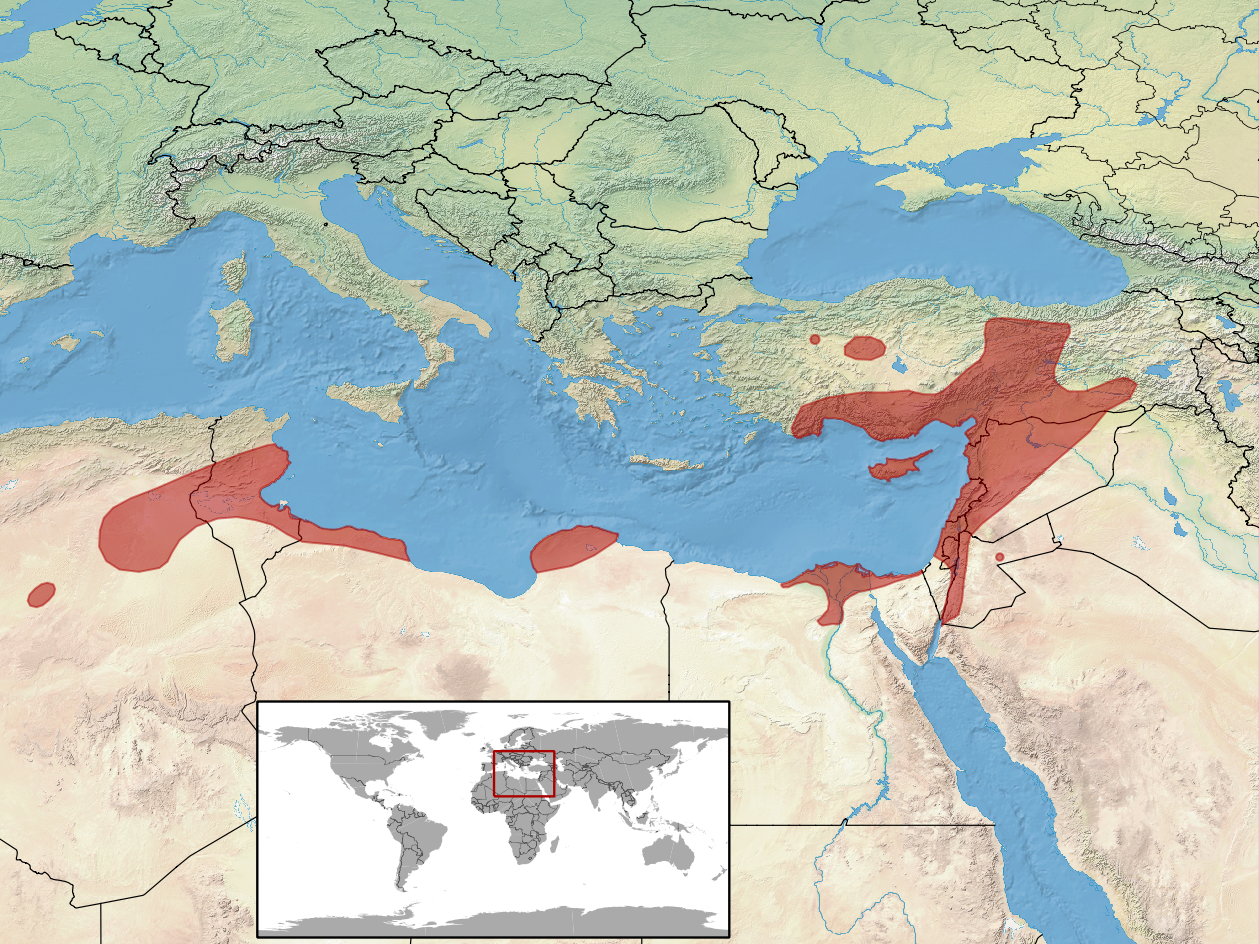

Synonyms
- Eutropis vittata Mabuya vittata Trachylepis vittata

= Bridled mabuya =

Species of lizard

The bridled mabuya or bridled skink (Heremites vittatus) is a species of skink found in North Africa and Middle East. They grow up to 22 cm.

The binomial name of this species has seen multiple revisions in the early 2000s. The current binomial name is Heremites vittatus. Previously it was known as Mabuya vittata and for short period as Eutropis vittata and Trachylepis vittata. The reason for those changes is an attempt to divide the vast genus Mabuya in a few smaller genera.

The bridled mabuya lives in open sandy or stony soil with little grass or bushy vegetation. They are usually found near water; in Egypt in the Wetlands and near oases in Tunisia. It can grow up to 22 centimeters long and has a smooth, shiny, body with overlapping scales. Their heads are cone shaped and they have elongated bodies and a tapering tail that is easily broken but can be regenerated.

The bridled mabuya feeds primarily on insects and other arthropods.

== General References ==
- The Reptile Database
- ZipcodeZoo
- Freebase
- Skinks
