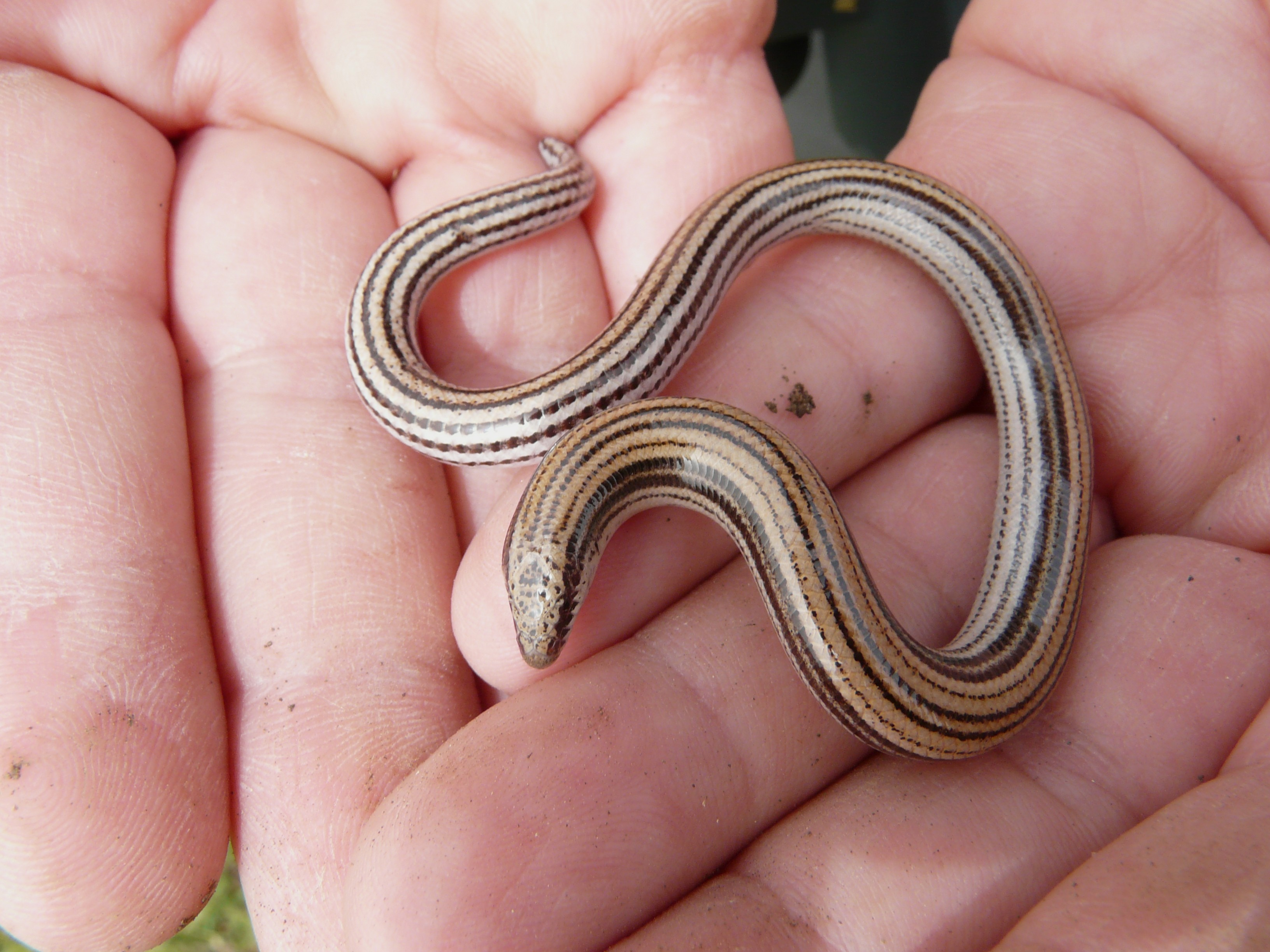
- Specimen from Jordan

Conservation status
- Data Deficient (IUCN 3.1)

Scientific classification
- Kingdom: Animalia
- Phylum: Chordata
- Class: Reptilia
- Order: Squamata
- Family: Scincidae
- Genus: Ophiomorus
- Species: O. latastii

Binomial name
- Ophiomorus latastii Boulenger, 1887
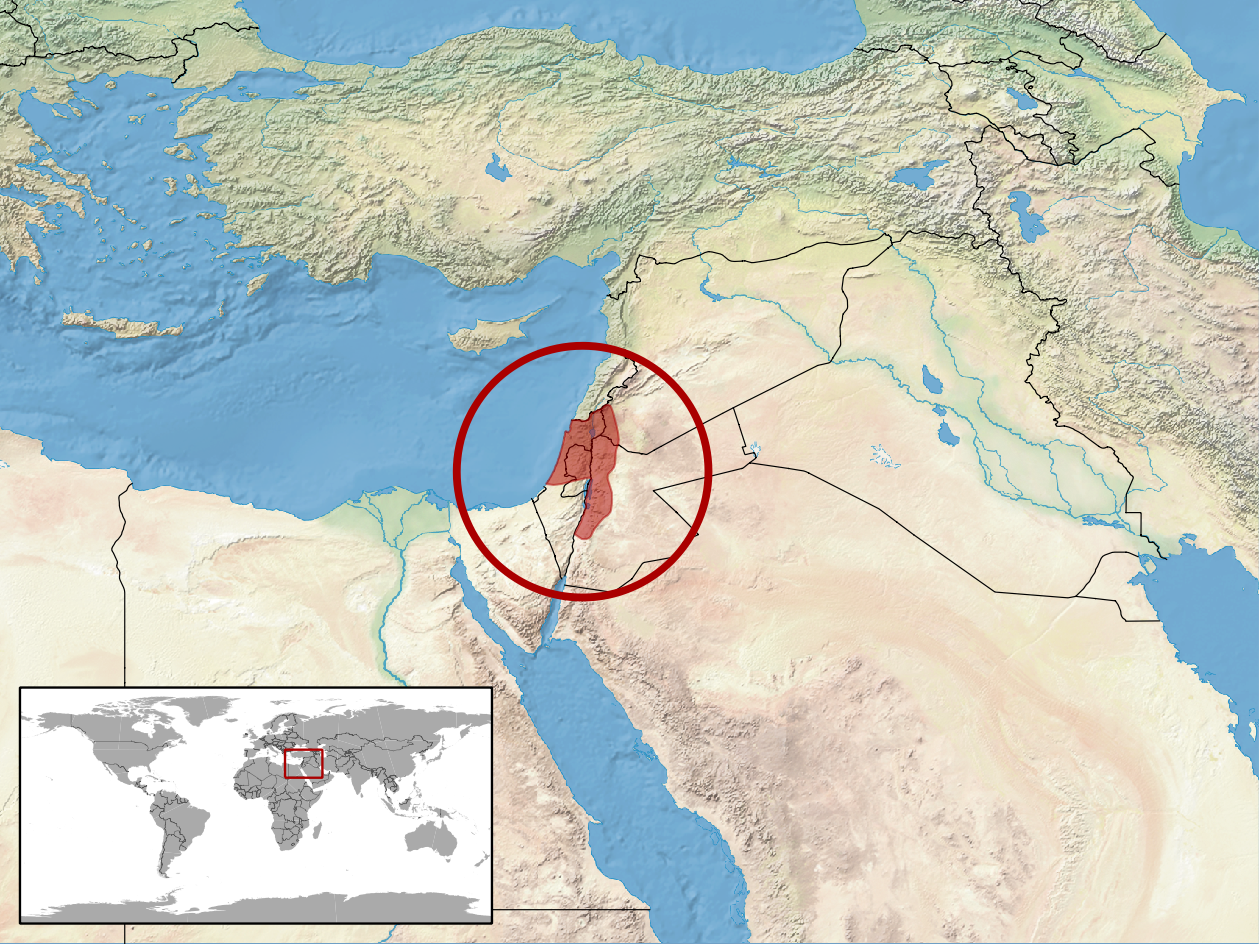

= Ophiomorus latastii =

Species of lizard

Ophiomorus latastii, also known commonly as Lataste's snake skink and Latast's [sic] snake skink is a species of skink, a lizard in the subfamily Scincinae of the family Scincidae. The species is native to the Near East.

== Etymology ==
The specific name, latastii, is in honor of French herpetologist Fernand Lataste.

== Geographic range ==
O. latastii is found in Israel, Jordan, Occupied Palestinian territories, Syria, and possibly Lebanon.

== Habitat ==
The natural habitats of O. latastii are subtropical or tropical dry shrubland and Mediterranean-type shrubby vegetation.

== Description ==
O. latastii is limbless. The snout is conical. There are 16 scale rows around the body at midbody.

== Reproduction ==
O. latastii is viviparous.

== Conservation status ==
The species O. latastii is threatened by habitat loss.
