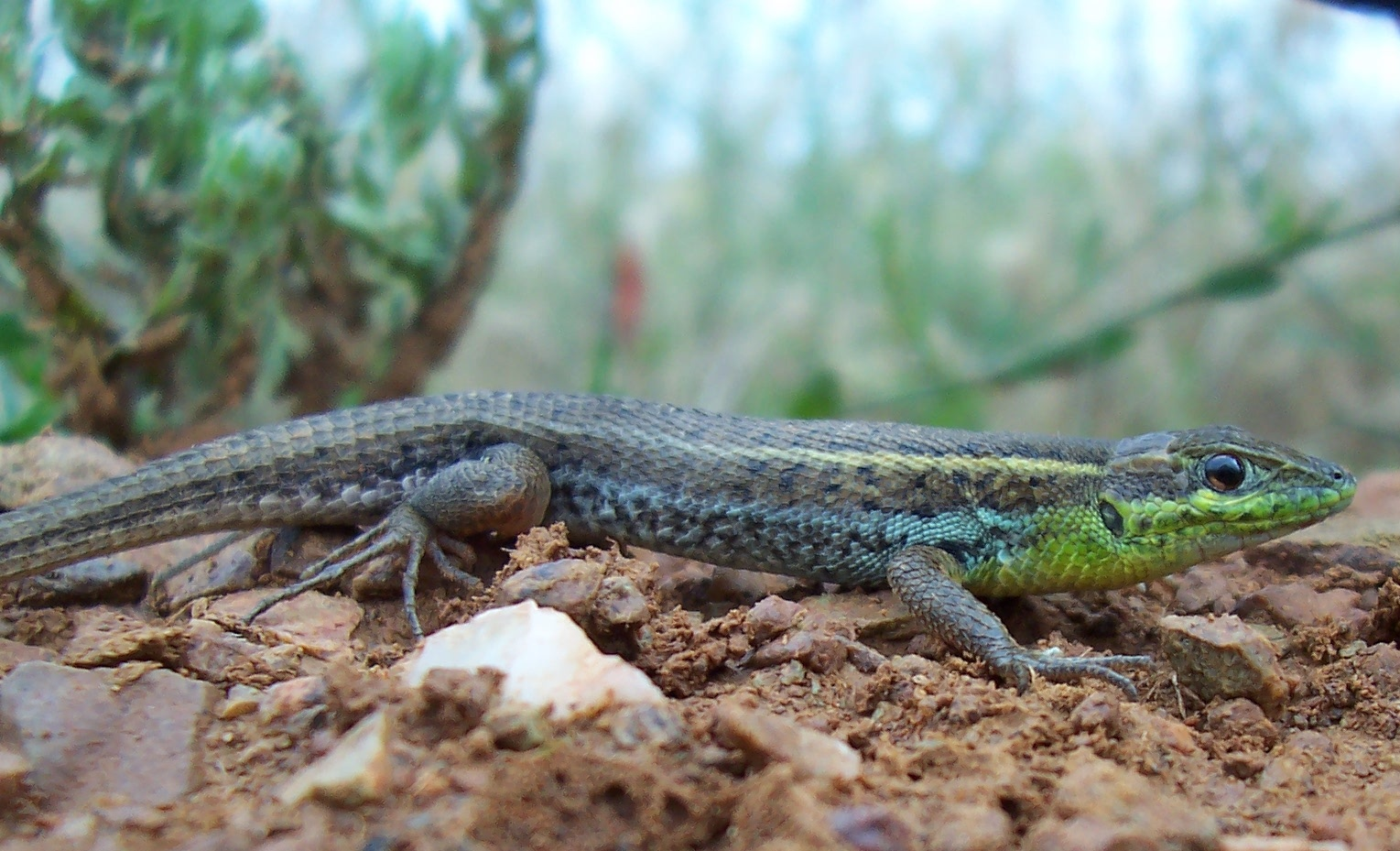

Conservation status
- Least Concern (IUCN 3.1)

Scientific classification
- Kingdom: Animalia
- Phylum: Chordata
- Class: Reptilia
- Order: Squamata
- Family: Lacertidae
- Genus: Ophisops
- Species: O. elegans

Binomial name
- Ophisops elegans Ménétries, 1832

= Ophisops elegans =

Species of lizard

Ophisops elegans, commonly known as the snake-eyed lizard, is a species of lizard in the family Lacertidae. The species is endemic to the Mediterranean region and Central Asia. There are nine recognized subspecies.

== Description ==
O. elegans has the following distinguishing characters: Head moderate, feebly depressed. Upper head-shields smooth or slightly rugose; nostril lateral, pierced between on upper and a lower nasal, and followed by one or two postnasals; frontonasal single; four supra-oculars, first and fourth very small, the two principal separated from the supraciliaries by a series of granules: occipital small, in contact with or separated from the interparietal; subocular bordering the lip, normally between the fourth and fifth upper labials; temporal scales small, smooth; usually two large supratemporal shields bordering the parietal; a large tympanic shield. A. gular fold may be distinguishable; collar absent or feebly marked. Dorsal scales variable in size, as large as or larger than the laterals; 30 to 40 scales round the middle of the body, ventrals included. A more or less enlarged postero-median preanal plate. The hind limb reaches about the ear in the male, the shoulder or a little beyond in the female. 7 to 12 (usually 9 to 11) femoral pores on each side. Tail about twice as long as head and body. Olive or bronzy above, with black spots usually forming longitudinal series, sometimes forming a network; frequently and or two light longitudinal streaks on each side; lower surfaces white.

From snout to vent 2 inches (5 cm); tail 4 inches (10 cm).

== Subspecies ==
The following nine subspecies are recognized as being valid, including the nominotypical subspecies.

- Ophisops elegans basoglui Baran & Budak, 1978
- Ophisops elegans blanfordi Schmidt, 1939
- Ophisops elegans budakibarani Tok, Afsar, Yakin, Ayaz & Çiçek, 2017
- Ophisops elegans centralanatoliae Bodenheimer, 1944
- Ophisops elegans ehrenbergerii (Wiegmann, 1835)
- Ophisops elegans elegans Ménétries, 1832
- Ophisops elegans macrodactylus Berthold, 1840
- Ophisops elegans persicus Boulenger, 1918
- Ophisops elegans schlueteri Boettger, 1880

Nota bene: A trinomial authority in parentheses indicates that the subspecies was originally described in a genus other than Ophisops.

== Etymology ==
The subspecific name, schlueteri, is in honor of Wilhelm Schlüter, who was a German dealer of natural history specimens.

== Geographic range ==
O. elegans is found in E Georgia, Armenia, Azerbaijan, SE Bulgaria, NE Greece (Lesbos, Limnos, Chios, Romania, Samos, Samothraki, Agathonisi, Psara), Cyprus, Turkey, Algeria, Libya, Egypt, W Syria, Lebanon, Israel, W Jordan, Iraq, Iran (Kavir desert), N Pakistan, NW India.

Races:

- O. e. basoglui – S Anatolia
- O. e. blanfordi – Pakistan
- O. e. centralanatolia – C Anatolia
- O. e. ehrenbergi – Kalymnos, Lesbos etc.
- O. e. elegans – Turkey (including Anatolia)
- O. e. macrodactylus – W Turkey, Greece (Lesbos etc.)
- O. e. schlueteri – Cyprus

Type locality: Baku, Azerbaijan.

== Habitat ==
The preferred natural habitats of O. elegans are grassland, shrubland and forest, at altitudes of 400–2,000 m (1,300–6,600 ft).

== Reproduction ==
O. elegans is oviparous.
