= Eirenis levantinus =

Conservation status
- Least Concern (IUCN 3.1)

Scientific classification
- Kingdom: Animalia
- Phylum: Chordata
- Class: Reptilia
- Order: Squamata
- Suborder: Serpentes
- Family: Colubridae
- Genus: Eirenis
- Species: E. levantinus

Binomial name
- Eirenis levantinus Schmidtler, 1993
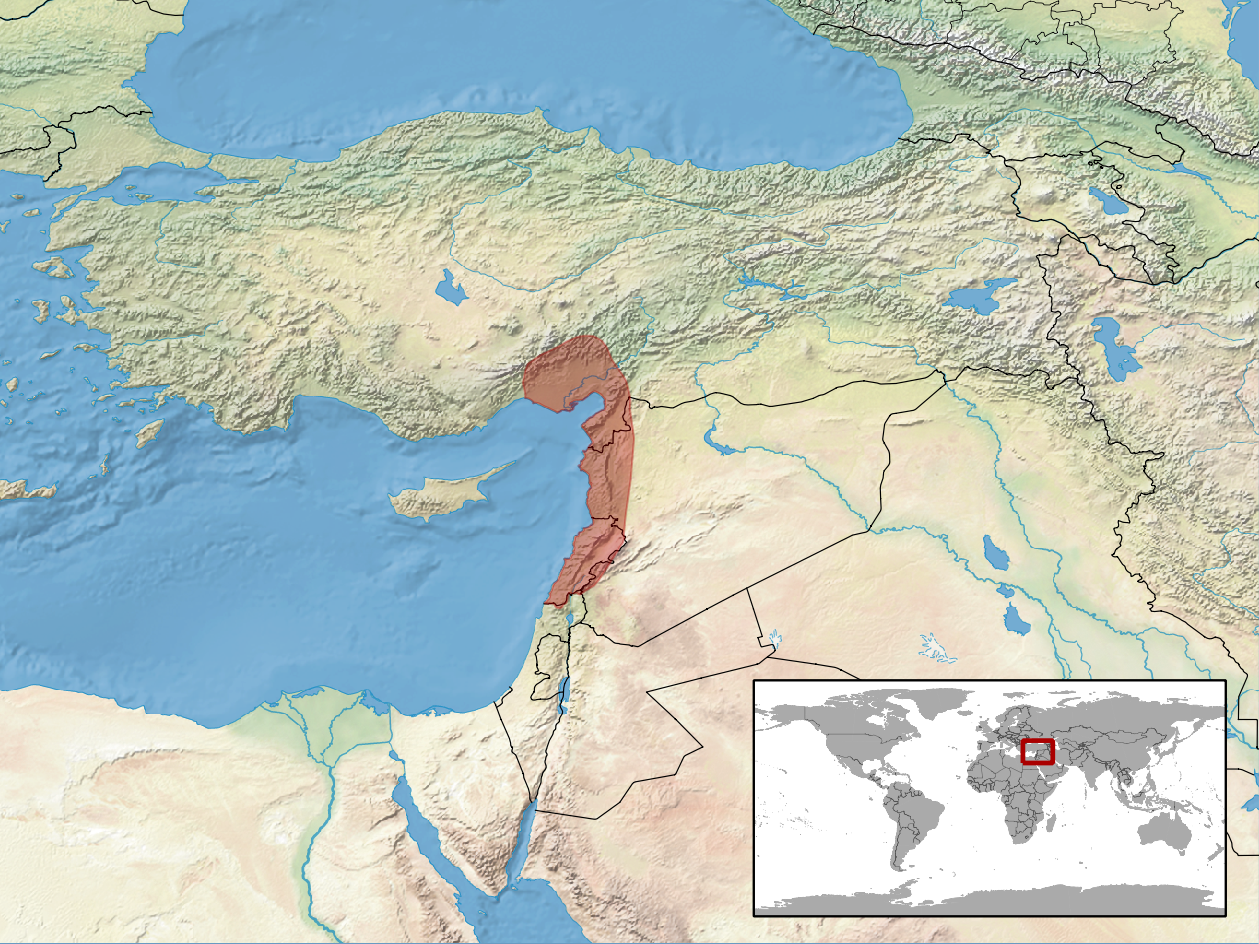

Species of snake

Eirenis levantinus is a species of snake in the family Colubridae . It is found in Lebanon, Syria, and Turkey, and was rediscovered on Cyprus in 2007 ~150 years after the first report. Its natural habitats are Mediterranean-type shrubby vegetation, plantations, and rural gardens. It is threatened by habitat loss.

They are insectivores and are among the few snakes that eat a diet consisting entirely of insects and worms. In the wild, they consume a variety of prey such as crickets, moths, grasshoppers, caterpillars, fly larvae, spiders, and worms.
