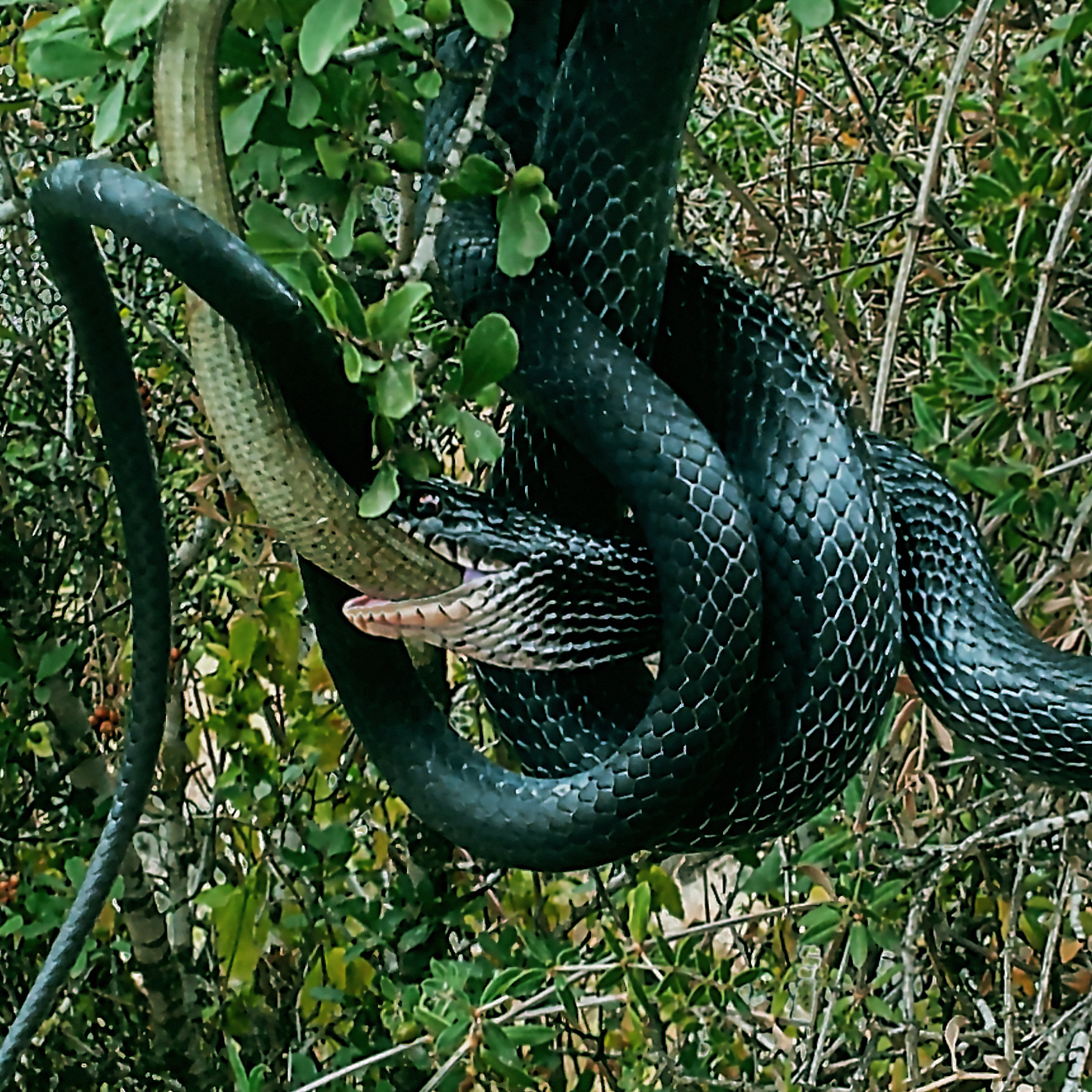
- Dolichophis jugularis preying on a sheltopusik

Conservation status
- Least Concern (IUCN 3.1)

Scientific classification
- Kingdom: Animalia
- Phylum: Chordata
- Class: Reptilia
- Order: Squamata
- Suborder: Serpentes
- Family: Colubridae
- Genus: Dolichophis
- Species: D. jugularis

Binomial name
- Dolichophis jugularis (Linnaeus, 1758)

Synonyms
- Coluber jugularis Linnaeus, 1758; Zamenis viridiflavus var. asiana Boettger, 1880; Hierophis jugularis — Schätti, 1988; Dolichophis jugularis — Nagy et al., 2004

= Dolichophis jugularis =

Species of snake

Dolichophis jugularis, also known commonly as the black whipsnake and the large whip snake, is a species of snake in the family Colubridae. The species is native to West Asia. There are three subspecies.

== Geographic range ==
Dolichophis jugularis is found in Cyprus, Greece, Turkey, Iran, Iraq, Israel, Jordan, Kuwait, Lebanon, Malta, and Syria.

== Habitat ==
D. jugularis is found in a variety of habitats including forest, shrubland, grassland, and freshwater wetlands, at altitudes up to 1,000 m (3,300 ft).

== Description ==
Dorsally, adults are black, but juveniles are tan with darker small blotches. The juvenile pattern disappears when the snake reaches the age of three to four years.

== Reproduction ==
D. jugularis is oviparous. Clutch size is 7–11 eggs.

== Subspecies ==
Three subspecies are recognized as being valid, including the nominotypical subspecies.

- Dolichophis jugularis asianus (Boettger, 1880)
- Dolichophis jugularis cypriacus (Zinner, 1972)
- Dolichophis jugularus jugularis (Linnaeus, 1758)
