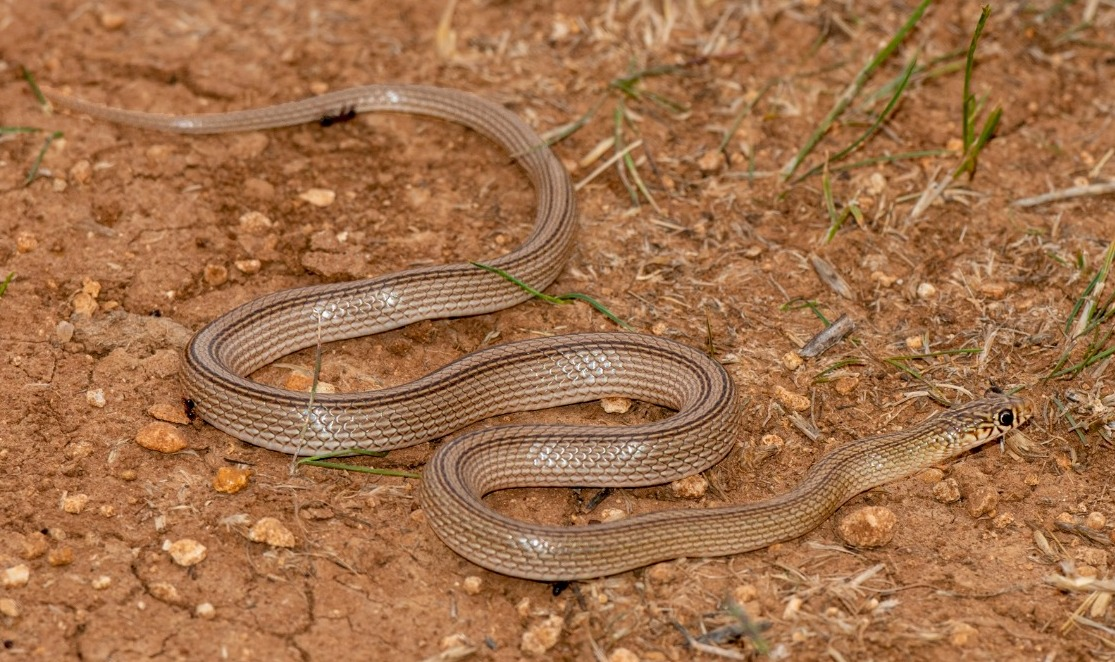
- Eirenis decemlineatus in Mardin, Turkey

Conservation status
- Least Concern (IUCN 3.1)

Scientific classification
- Kingdom: Animalia
- Phylum: Chordata
- Class: Reptilia
- Order: Squamata
- Suborder: Serpentes
- Family: Colubridae
- Genus: Eirenis
- Species: E. decemlineatus

Binomial name
- Eirenis decemlineatus (A. M. C. Duméril, Bibron, and A. H. A. Duméril, 1854)
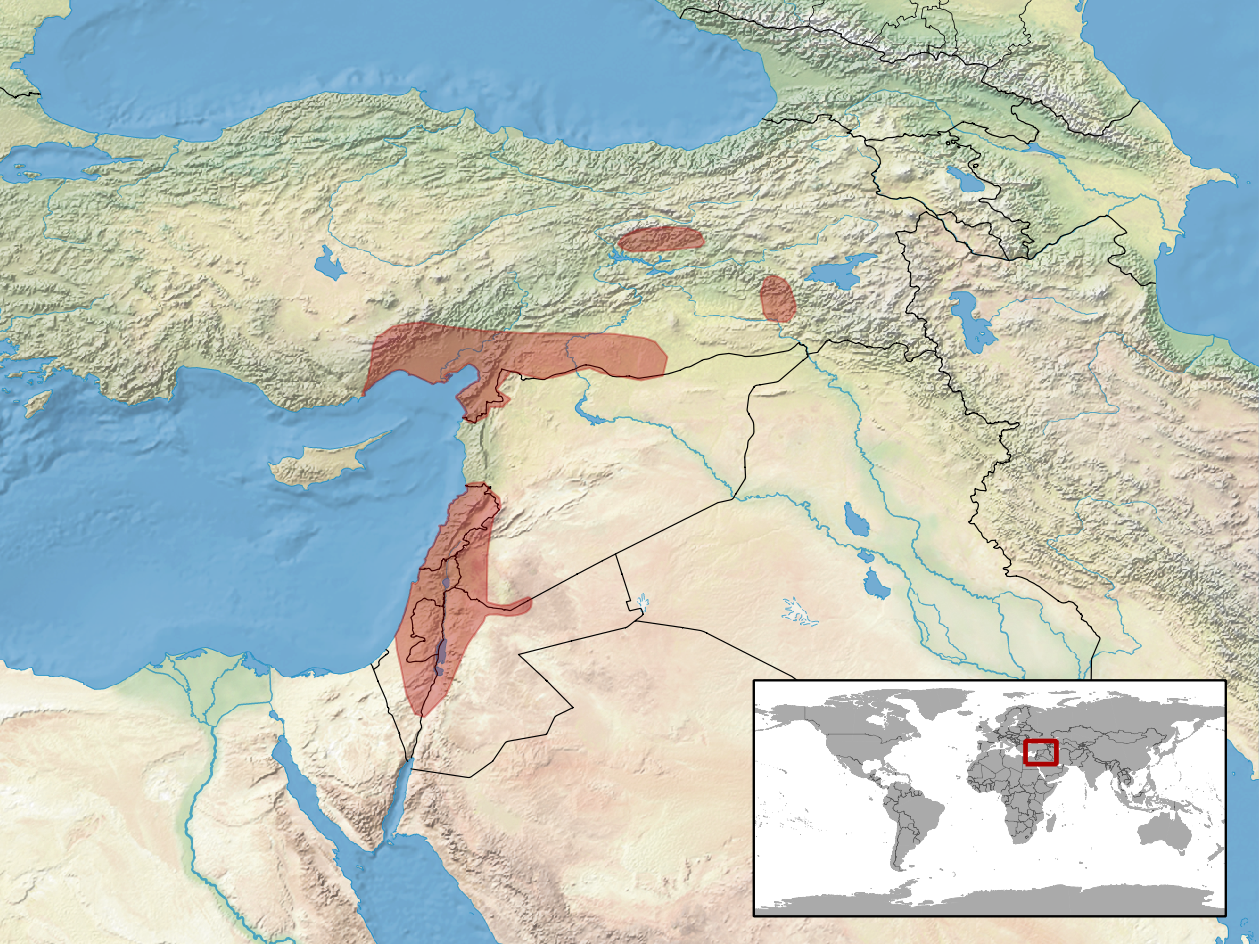

= Eirenis decemlineatus =

Species of snake

Eirenis decemlineatus, commonly known as the narrow-striped dwarf snake, is a non-venomous snake found in West Asia and the Middle East.

== Description ==
Eirenis decemlineatus (Eirenis decemlineata) adults range from 45 to 90 cm in length.

Body is brown above, uniform or with two thin, dark stripes running the length of the body and tail. Lower parts uniform white. Two forms of the Narrow-striped dwarf snake may occur in the same habitat; one with longitudinal lines and the other with gray dorsum void of lines.

== Distribution ==
This species found in Turkey, Syria, Lebanon, Israel, Palestine, Jordan extending to Iraq and Iran.

This species is found in sparsely vegetated rocky areas of pine and oak forest. It can also be found in orchards and rural gardens.

== Feed ==
Feeds mainly on large insects, scorpions, spiders and centipedes.

== Reproduction ==
Oviparous, the female lays eggs.
