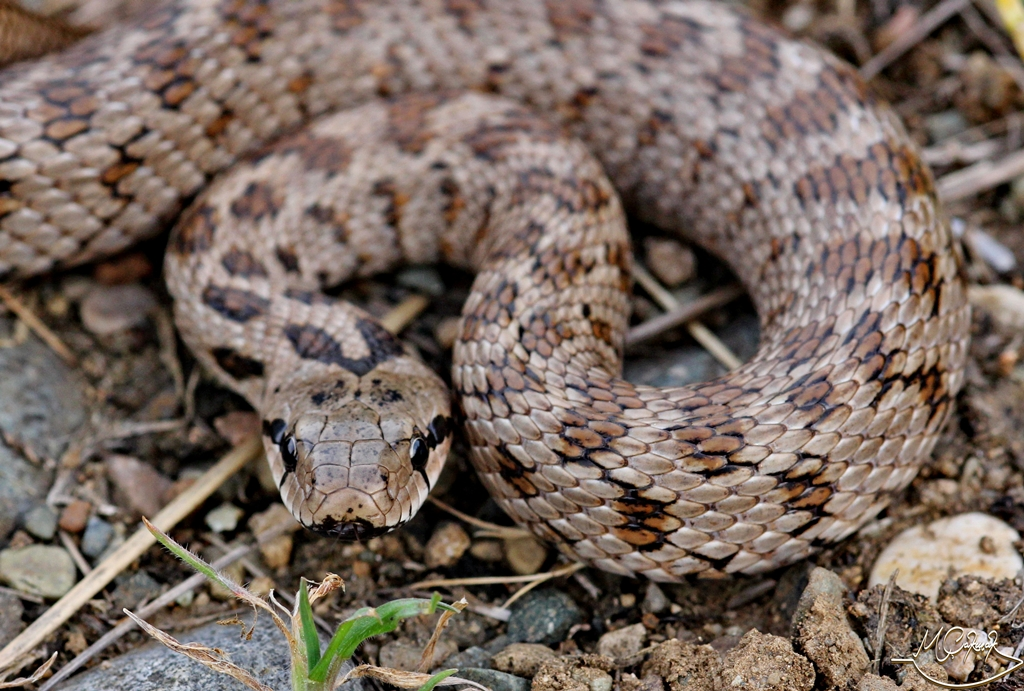

Conservation status
- Least Concern (IUCN 3.1)

Scientific classification
- Kingdom: Animalia
- Phylum: Chordata
- Class: Reptilia
- Order: Squamata
- Suborder: Serpentes
- Family: Colubridae
- Genus: Zamenis
- Species: Z. hohenackeri

Binomial name
- Zamenis hohenackeri (Strauch, 1873)

Synonyms
- Coluber hohenackeri Strauch, 1873; Elaphe hohenackeri — Engelmann et al., 1993; Zamenis hohenackeri — Utiger et al., 2002

= Transcaucasian ratsnake =

Species of snake

The Transcaucasian ratsnake (Zamenis hohenackeri), also commonly known as the Gavand snake, is a species of nonvenomous ratsnake in the subfamily Colubrinae of the family Colubridae. The species is native to Western Asia and the Middle East. There are three recognized subspecies.

== Etymology ==
The specific name, hohenackeri, is in honor of Rudolph Friedrich Hohenacker, who was a Swiss missionary, physician, and naturalist.

== Geographic range ==
Zamenis hohenackeri is found in Armenia, Azerbaijan, Georgia, Iran, Iraq, Israel, Lebanon, southwestern Russia, Syria, and Turkey.

== Description ==
Zamenis hohenackeri may attain a total length of 65 cm (26 in), which includes a tail 11 cm (4.3 in) long. Dorsally, it is gray with four alternating series of dark brown spots. Ventrally, it is reddish or yellowish, marbled or spotted with gray. On the head, there is a diagonal black streak from the eye to the corner of the mouth, and a vertical black line below the eye.

== Habitat ==
Zamenis hohenackeri is found in mountainous areas, at altitudes of 100–3,000 m (330–9,840 ft), in a variety of habitats, from dry to wet, including agricultural areas.

== Behavior ==
Zamenis hohenackeri is terrestrial and diurnal.

== Reproduction ==
Zamenis hohenackeri is oviparous. Clutch size is 3–7 eggs.

== Subspecies ==
Three subspecies are recognized as being valid, including the nominotypical subspecies.

- Zamenis hohenackeri hohenackeri (Strauch, 1873)
- Zamenis hohenackeri lyciensis Hofmann, Mebert, Schulz, Helfenberger, Göçmen & Böhme, 2018
- Zamenis hohenackeri tauricus (F. Werner, 1898)

Nota bene: A trinomial authority in parentheses indicates that the subspecies was originally described in a genus other than Zamenis hohenackeri.
