= List of reptiles of Turkey =

This is a list of the reptiles of Turkey.

There are 136 species of reptiles in Turkey.

== Class: Reptilia ==
=== Order: Squamata (lizards and snakes) ===
==== Suborder: Amphisbaenia (worm lizards) ====
- Family: Blanidae
  - Genus: Blanus
    - Alexander's worm lizard (Blanus alexandri)
    - Turkish worm lizard (Blanus aporus)
    - Anatolian worm lizard (Blanus strauchi)

==== Suborder: Anguimorpha (legless lizards and monitors) ====
- Family: Anguidae
  - Genus: Pseudopus
    - Sheltopusik (Pseudopus apodus)
  - Genus: Anguis
    - Common slowworm (Anguis fragilis)
- Family: Varanidae
  - Genus: Varanus
    - Desert monitor (Varanus griseus)

==== Suborder: Iguania (agamas and chameleons) ====
- Family: Agamidae
  - Genus: Paralaudakia
    - Caucasian agama (Paralaudakia caucasia)
  - Genus: Laudakia
    - Laudakia stellio
  - Genus: Phrynocephalus
    - Sunwatcher toad-headed agama (Phrynocephalus helioscopus)
    - Persian toad-headed agama (Phrynocephalus persicus)
  - Genus: Trapelus
    - Horny-scaled agama (Trapelus lessonae)
- Family: Chamaeleonidae
  - Genus: Chamaeleo
    - Common chameleon (Chamaeleo chamaeleon)

==== Suborder: Lacertilia (true lizards) ====
- Family: Lacertidae
  - Genus: Acanthodactylus
    - Bosc's fringe-toed lizard (Acanthodactylus boskianus)
    - Harran fringe-toed lizard (Acanthodactylus harranensis)
    - Schreiber's fringe-fingered lizard (Acanthodactylus schreiberi)
  - Genus: Anatololacerta
    - Anatolian rock lizard (Anatololacerta anatolica)
    - Danford's lizard (Anatololacerta danfordi)
  - Genus: Apathya
    - Anatolian lizard (Apathya cappadocica)
  - Genus: Darevskia
    - Armenian lizard (Darevskia armeniaca)
    - Bendimahi lizard (Darevskia bendimahiensis)
    - Brauner's lizard (Darevskia brauneri)
    - Clark's lizard (Darevskia clarkorum)
    - Derjugin's lizard (Darevskia derjugini)
    - Charnali lizard (Darevskia dryada)
    - Ajarian lizard (Darevskia mixta)
    - Georgian lizard (Darevskia parvula)
    - Meadow lizard (Darevskia praticola)
    - Radde's lizard (Darevskia raddei)
    - Spiny-tailed lizard (Darevskia rudis)
    - Van lizard (Darevskia sapphirina)
    - Saxicolous lizard (Darevskia saxicola)
    - White-bellied lizard (Darevskia unisexualis)
    - Uzzell's lizard (Darevskia uzzelli)
    - Valentin's lizard (Darevskia valentini)
  - Genus: Eremias
    - Steppe-runner (Eremias arguta)
    - Pleske's racerunner (Eremias pleskei)
    - Strauch's racerunner (Eremias strauchi)
    - Suphan racerunner (Eremias suphani)
  - Genus: Lacerta
    - Sand lizard (Lacerta agilis)
    - Three-lined lizard (Lacerta media)
    - Rock lizard (Lacerta oertzeni)
    - Pamphylian green lizard (Lacerta pamphylica)
    - Caspian green lizard (Lacerta strigata)
    - Balkan green lizard (Lacerta trilineata)
    - European green lizard (Lacerta viridis)
  - Genus: Mesalina
    - Blanford's short-nosed desert lizard (Mesalina brevirostris)
  - Genus: Ophisops
    - Snake-eyed lizard (Ophisops elegans)
  - Genus: Parvilacerta
    - Dwarf lizard (Parvilacerta parva)
  - Genus: Phoenicolacerta
    - Sparse blue lizard (Phoenicolacerta cyanisparsa)
    - Lebanon lizard (Phoenicolacerta laevis)
  - Genus: Podarcis
    - Common wall lizard (Podarcis muralis)
    - Italian wall lizard (Podarcis siculus)
    - Balkan wall lizard (Podarcis tauricus)
  - Genus: Timon
    - Siirt lizard (Timon princeps)

==== Suborder: Scincomorpha (skinks) ====
- Family: Scincidae
  - Genus: Ablepharus
    - Twin-striped skink (Ablepharus bivittatus)
    - Budak's snake-eyed skink (Ablepharus budaki)
    - Chernov's skink (Ablepharus chernovi)
    - European copper skink (Ablepharus kitaibelii)
  - Genus: Chalcides
    - Gongilo (Chalcides ocellatus)
  - Genus: Eumeces
    - Berber skink (Eumeces schneiderii)
  - Genus: Ophiomorus
    - Limbless skink (Ophiomorus punctatissimus)
  - Genus: Heremites
    - Golden grass mabuya (Heremites auratus)
  - Genus: Trachylepis
    - Bridled mabuya (Trachylepis vittata)

==== Suborder: Scleroglossa (geckos) ====
- Family: Gekkonidae
  - Genus: Cyrtopodion
    - Blanford's middle-toed gecko (Cyrtopodion heterocercum)
    - Kotschy's middle-toed gecko (Cyrtopodion kotschyi)
    - Rough-tailed gecko (Cyrtopodion scabrum)
  - Genus: Eublepharis
    - Iranian fat-tailed gecko (Eublepharis angramainyu)
  - Genus: Hemidactylus
    - Mediterranean house gecko (Hemidactylus turcicus)
  - Genus: Stenodactylus
    - Jordan short-fingered gecko (Stenodactylus grandiceps)
- Family: Phyllodactylidae
  - Genus: Asaccus
    - Werner's leaf-toed gecko (Asaccus elisae)

==== Suborder: Serpentes (snakes) ====
- Family: Typhlopidae
  - Genus: Letheobia
    - Beaked blindsnake (Letheobia episcopus)
  - Genus: Typhlops
    - European blindsnake (Typhlops vermicularis)
- Family: Leptotyphlopidae
  - Genus: Myriopholis
    - Long-nosed worm-snake (Leptotyphlops macrorhynchus)
- Family: Boidae
  - Genus: Eryx
    - Javelin sand boa (Eryx jaculus)
- Family: Colubridae
  - Genus: Coronella
    - Smooth snake (Coronella austriaca)
  - Genus: Dolichophis
    - Caspian whipsnake (Dolichophis caspius)
    - Black whipsnake (Dolichophis jugularis)
    - Red-bellied racer (Dolichophis schmidti)
  - Genus: Eirenis
    - Bolkar dwarf snake (Eirenis aurolineatus)
    - Baran's dwarf racer (Eirenis barani)
    - Collared dwarf racer (Eirenis collaris)
    - Crowned dwarf snake (Eirenis coronella)
    - Narrow-striped dwarf snake (Eirenis decemlineatus)
    - Eiselt's dwarf racer (Eirenis eiselti)
    - Hakkari dwarf snake (Eirenis hakkariensis)
    - Levantine dwarf snake (Eirenis levantinus)
    - Striped dwarf snake (Eirenis lineomaculatus)
    - Ring-headed dwarf snake (Eirenis modestus)
    - Dotted dwarf racer (Eirenis punctatolineatus)
    - Roth's dwarf racer (Eirenis rothii)
    - Van dwarf snake (Eirenis thospitis)
  - Genus: Elaphe
    - Blotched snake (Elaphe sauromates)
  - Genus: Hemorrhois
    - Coin-marked snake (Hemorrhois nummifer)
    - Spotted whipsnake (Hemorrhois ravergieri)
  - Genus: Malpolon
    - Montpellier snake (Malpolon monspessulanus)
  - Genus: Muhtarophis
    - Baran's black-headed dwarf snake (Muhtarophis barani)
  - Genus: Natrix
    - Large-headed water snake (Natrix megalocephala)
    - Grass snake (Natrix natrix)
    - Dice snake (Natrix tessellata)
  - Genus: Platyceps
    - Red whipsnake (Platyceps collaris)
    - Dahl's whipsnake (Platyceps najadum)
    - Glossy-bellied racer (Platyceps ventromaculatus)
  - Genus: Pseudocyclophis
    - Dark-headed dwarf racer (Pseudocyclophis persicus)
  - Genus: Rhynchocalamus
    - Black-headed groundsnake (Rhynchocalamus melanocephalus)
  - Genus: Spalerosophis
    - Diadem snake (Spalerosophis diadema)
  - Genus: Telescopus
    - European catsnake (Telescopus fallax)
    - Black catsnake (Telescopus nigriceps)
  - Genus: Zamenis
    - Transcaucasian ratsnake (Zamenis hohenackeri)
    - Aesculapian snake (Zamenis longissimus)
    - European ratsnake (Zamenis situla)
- Family: Elapidae
  - Genus: Walterinnesia
    - Eastern desert black snake (Walterinnesia morgani)
- Family: Viperidae
  - Genus: Macrovipera
    - Blunt-nosed viper (Macrovipera lebetinus)
  - Genus: Montivipera
    - Central Turkish mountain viper (Montivipera albizona)
    - Armenian viper (Montivipera raddei)
    - Ocellated mountain viper (Montivipera wagneri)
    - Ottoman viper (Montivipera xanthina)
  - Genus: Pseudocerastes
    - Persian horned viper (Pseudocerastes persicus)
  - Genus: Vipera
    - Long-nosed viper (Vipera ammodytes)
    - Baran's adder (Vipera barani)
    - Common European adder (Vipera berus)
    - Darevsky's viper (Vipera darevskii)
    - Armenian steppe viper (Vipera eriwanensis)
    - Caucasus viper (Vipera kaznakovi)
    - Pontic adder (Vipera pontica)
    - Transcaucasian sand viper (Vipera transcaucasiana)
    - Meadow viper (Vipera ursinii)

=== Order: Testudines (turtles and tortoises) ===
==== Suborder: Cryptodira ====
- Family: Dermochelyidae
  - Genus: Dermochelys
    - Leatherback sea turtle (Dermochelys coriacea)
- Family: Cheloniidae
  - Genus: Caretta
    - Loggerhead sea turtle (Caretta caretta)
  - Genus: Chelonia
    - Green sea turtle (Chelonia mydas)
- Family: Emydidae
  - Genus: Emys
    - European pond turtle (Emys orbicularis)
- Family: Geoemydidae
  - Genus: Mauremys
    - Caspian turtle (Mauremys caspica)
    - Balkan pond turtle (Mauremys rivulata)
- Family: Trionychidae
  - Genus: Rafetus
    - Euphrates softshell turtle (Rafetus euphraticus)
  - Genus: Trionyx
    - African softshell turtle (Trionyx triunguis)
- Family: Testudinidae
  - Genus: Testudo
    - Spur-thighed tortoise (Testudo graeca)
    - Hermann's tortoise (Testudo hermanni)
    - Marginated tortoise (Testudo marginata)

== See also ==
- Wildlife of Turkey
- List of mammals of Turkey
- List of birds of Turkey
- List of moths of Turkey
