= Darevskia adjarica =

Scientific classification
- Domain: Eukaryota
- Kingdom: Animalia
- Phylum: Chordata
- Class: Reptilia
- Order: Squamata
- Family: Lacertidae
- Genus: Darevskia
- Species: D. adjarica

Binomial name
- Darevskia adjarica (Darevsky & Eiselt, 1980)

Synonyms
- Lacerta parvula adjarica Darevsky & Eiselt, 1980

Species of lizard

Darevskia adjarica is a lizard species in the family Lacertidae. It is found in Georgia and Turkey.
