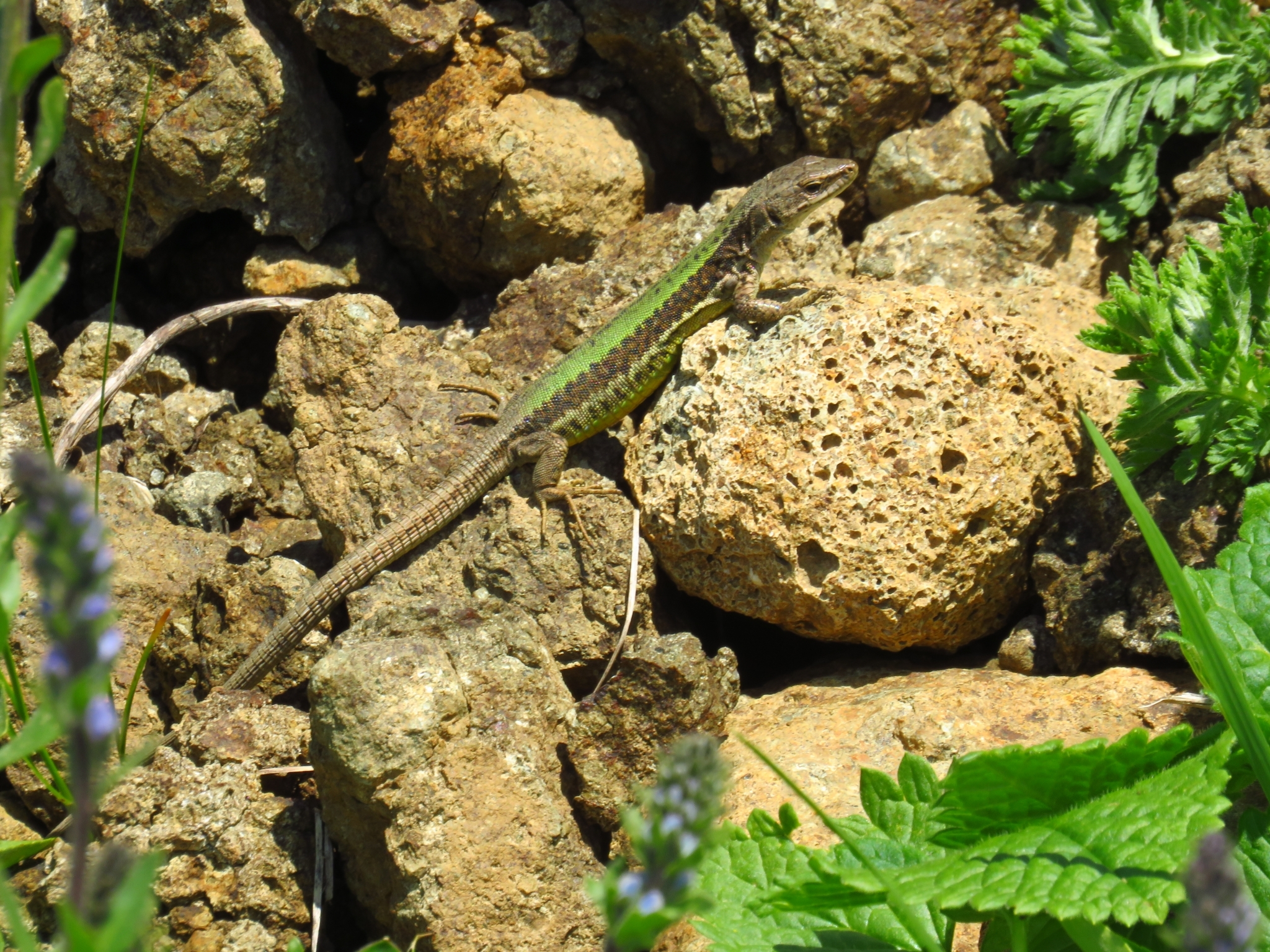

Conservation status
- Vulnerable (IUCN 3.1)

Scientific classification
- Kingdom: Animalia
- Phylum: Chordata
- Class: Reptilia
- Order: Squamata
- Family: Lacertidae
- Genus: Darevskia
- Species: D. alpina

Binomial name
- Darevskia alpina (Darevsky, 1967)

Synonyms
- Lacerta alpina Darevsky, 1967; Darevskia alpina — Arribas, 1997

= Darevskia alpina =

Species of lizard

Darevskia alpina is a species of lizard in the family Lacertidae. It is found in the Greater Caucasus in Georgia and Russia.
