= Darevskia arribasi =

Scientific classification
- Domain: Eukaryota
- Kingdom: Animalia
- Phylum: Chordata
- Class: Reptilia
- Order: Squamata
- Family: Lacertidae
- Genus: Darevskia
- Species: D. arribasi

Binomial name
- Darevskia arribasi Tuniyev, Petrova & Lotiev, 2023

Species of rock lizard

Darevskia arribasi is a species of rock lizard in the family Lacertidae. It is native to the area surrounding Ertso Lake in South Ossetia, Georgia. The species was named for herpetologist Oscar Arribas.
