= Darevskia bithynica =

Scientific classification
- Domain: Eukaryota
- Kingdom: Animalia
- Phylum: Chordata
- Class: Reptilia
- Order: Squamata
- Family: Lacertidae
- Genus: Darevskia
- Species: D. bithynica

Binomial name
- Darevskia bithynica (Méhelÿ, 1909)

Species of lizard

Darevskia bithynica is a lizard species in the genus Darevskia. It is endemic to Turkey.
