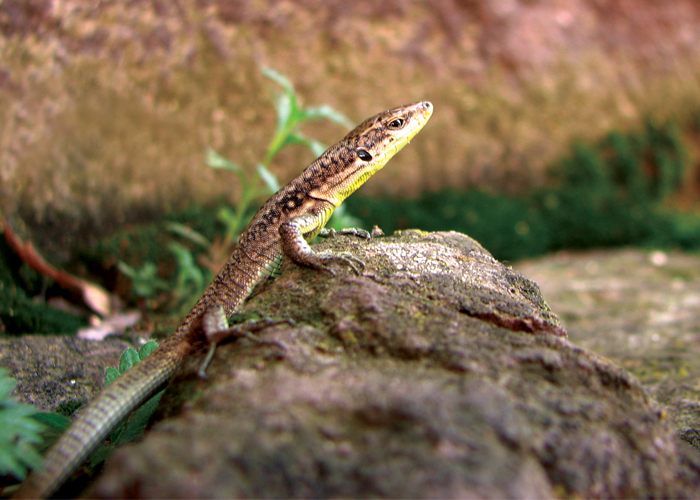

Conservation status
- Endangered (IUCN 3.1)

Scientific classification
- Kingdom: Animalia
- Phylum: Chordata
- Class: Reptilia
- Order: Squamata
- Family: Lacertidae
- Genus: Darevskia
- Species: D. rostombekowi

Binomial name
- Darevskia rostombekowi (Darevsky, 1957)

Synonyms
- Lacerta saxicola rostombekowi Darevsky, 1957; Lacerta rostombekovi [sic] — Darevsky, 1967; Darevskia rostombekovi — Arribas, 1997; Darevskia rostombekowi — Murphy et al., 2000; Lacerta (Darevskia) rostombekowi — Sindaco & Jeremčenko, 2008

= Darevskia rostombekowi =

Species of lizard

Darevskia rostombekowi is a species of lizard in the family Lacertidae. The species is endemic to Transcaucasia.

== Etymology ==
The specific name, rostombekowi, is in honor of Georgian biologist V. N. Rostombekov.

== Geographic range ==
D. rostombekowi is found in Armenia and Azerbaijan.

== Habitat ==
The preferred habitats of D. rostombekowi are rocky areas and shrubland, at altitudes of 600–1,700 m (2,000–5,600 ft).

== Reproduction ==
D. rostombekowi is oviparous and parthenogenetic.
