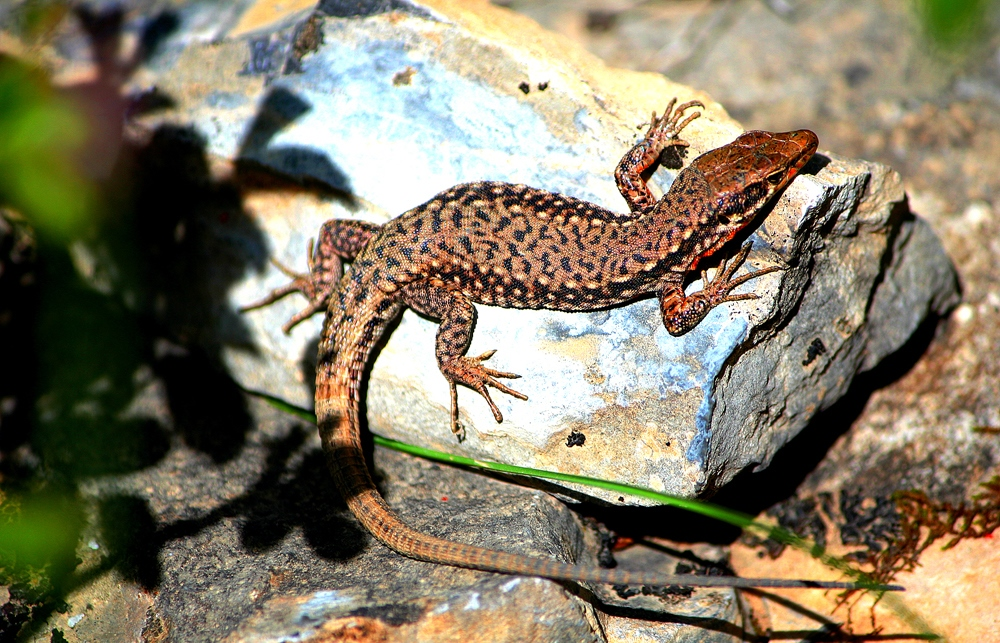

Conservation status
- Least Concern (IUCN 3.1)

Scientific classification
- Kingdom: Animalia
- Phylum: Chordata
- Class: Reptilia
- Order: Squamata
- Family: Lacertidae
- Genus: Darevskia
- Species: D. defilippii

Binomial name
- Darevskia defilippii (Camerano, 1877)

Synonyms
- Podarcis defilippii Camerano, 1877; Lacerta muralis var. defilippii — Boettger, 1866; Lacerta saxicola var. defilippii — Méhelÿ, 1909; Lacerta raddei defilippii — Engelmann et al., 1993; Lacerta defilippii — Frynta et al., 1997; Darevskia defilippii — Arribas, 1997

= Darevskia defilippii =

Species of lizard

Darevskia defilippii, also known commonly as the Alborz lizard or the Elburs lizard, is a species of lizard in the family Lacertidae. The species is endemic to Iran.

== Etymology ==
The specific name, defilippii, is in honor of Italian zoologist Filippo de Filippi.

== Geographic range ==
D. defilippii is found in the Alborz Mountains of northern Iran.

== Habitat ==
D. defilippii typically occurs on rocky slopes with shrubby vegetation, but it has also been recorded in grassy alpine landscapes and close to the upper limits of Hyrcanian forest. It is found from close to sea level to an altitude of 3,355 metres (11,007 ft).

== Reproduction ==
D. defilippii is oviparous.

== Gallery ==
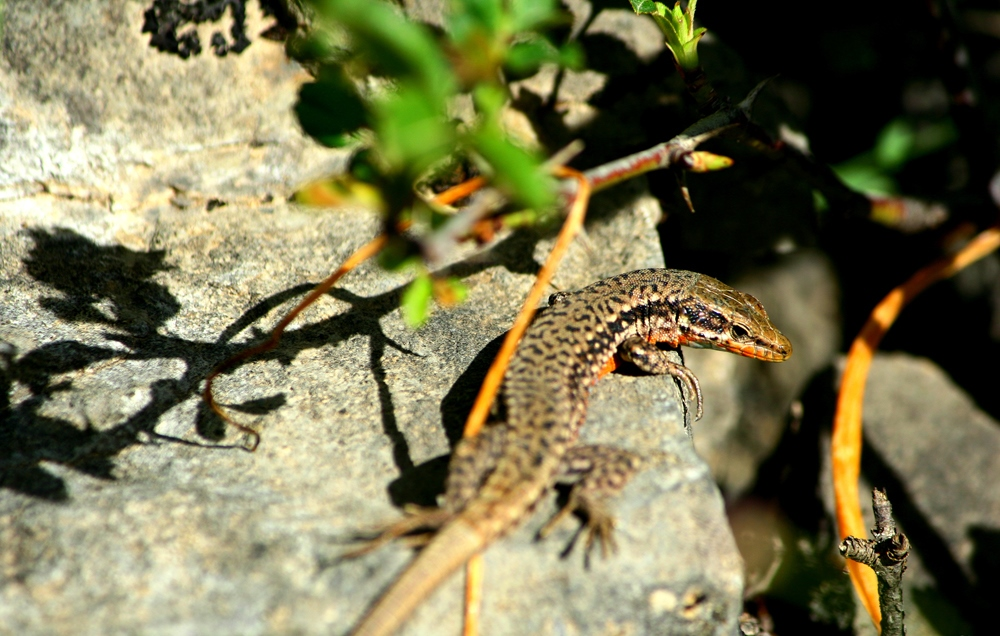
Alborz lizard

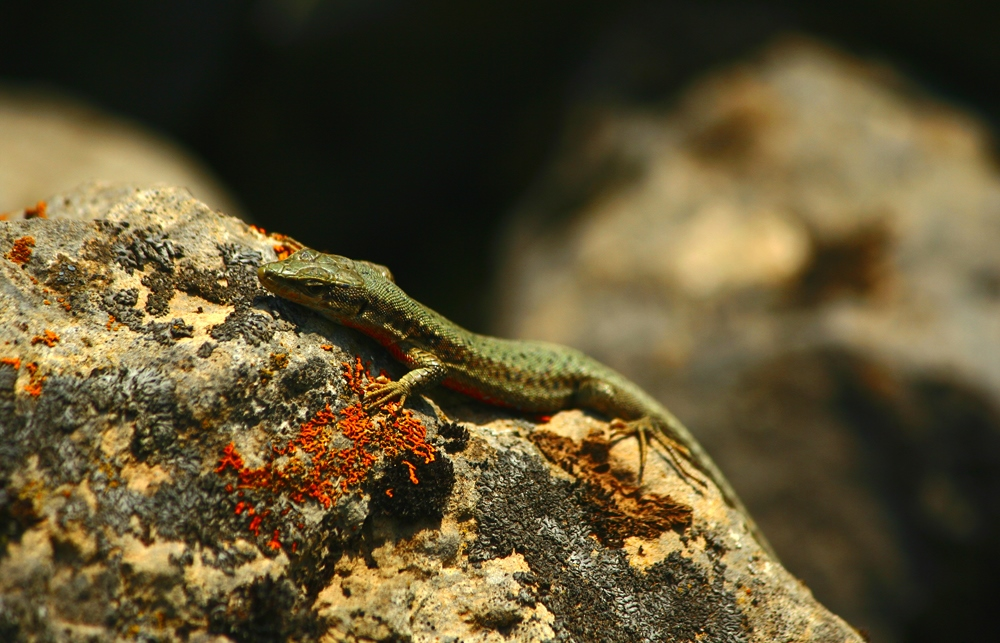
Alborz lizard

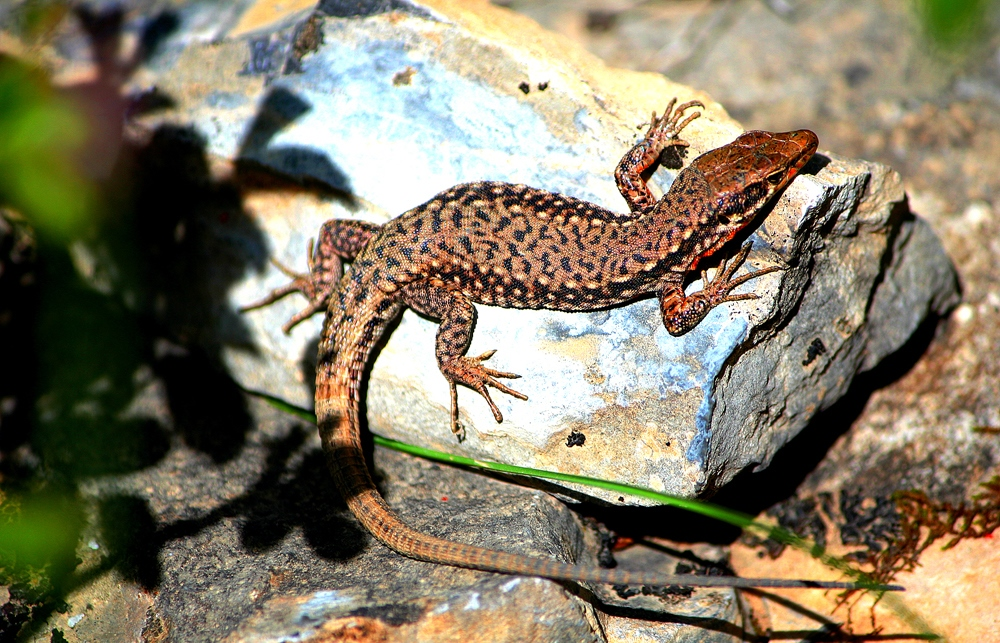
Alborz lizard

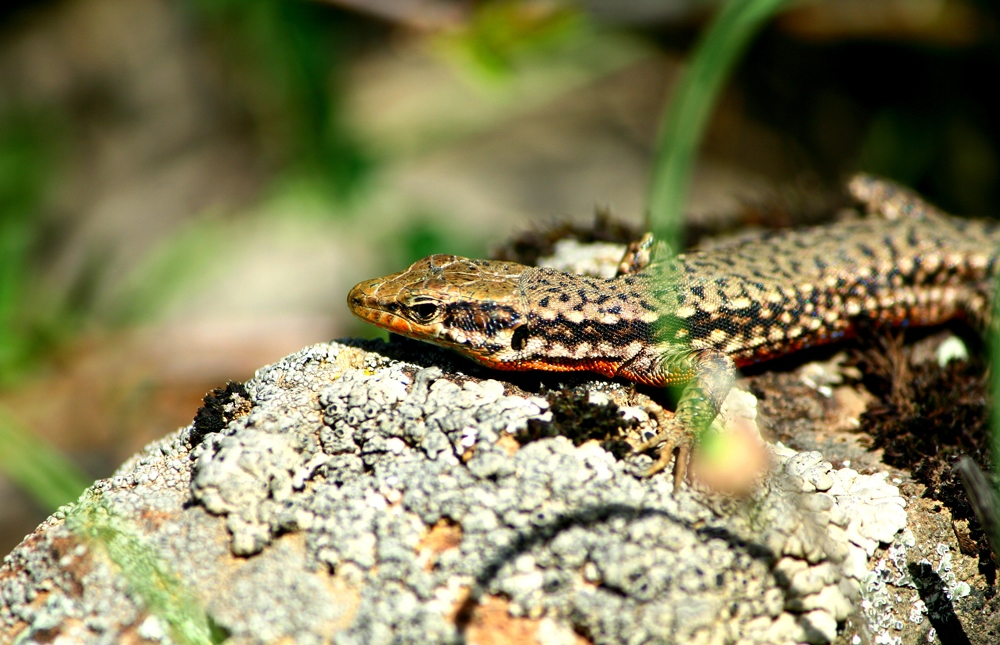
Alborz lizard

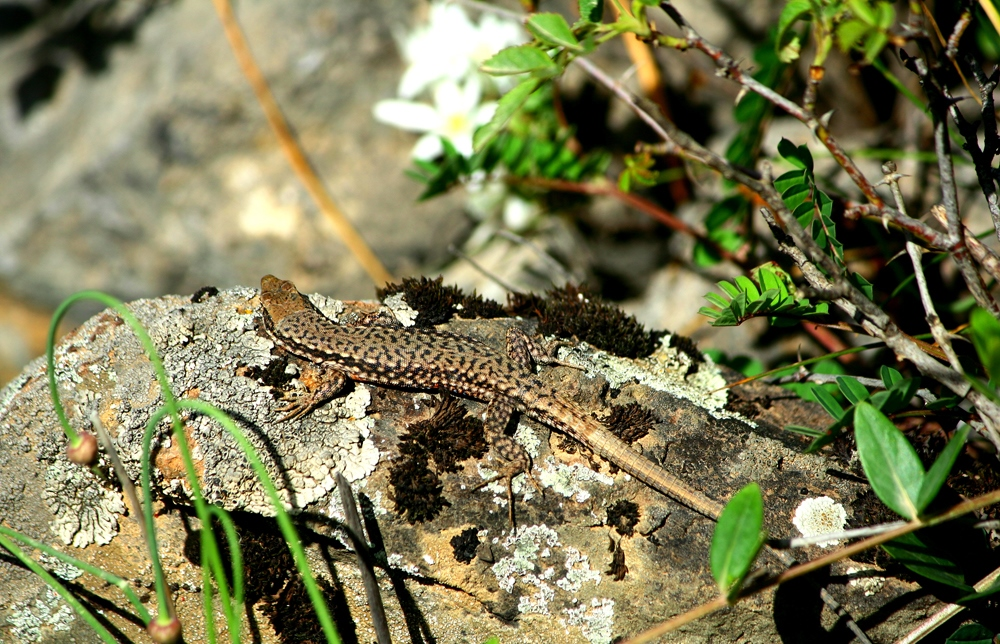
Alborz lizard
