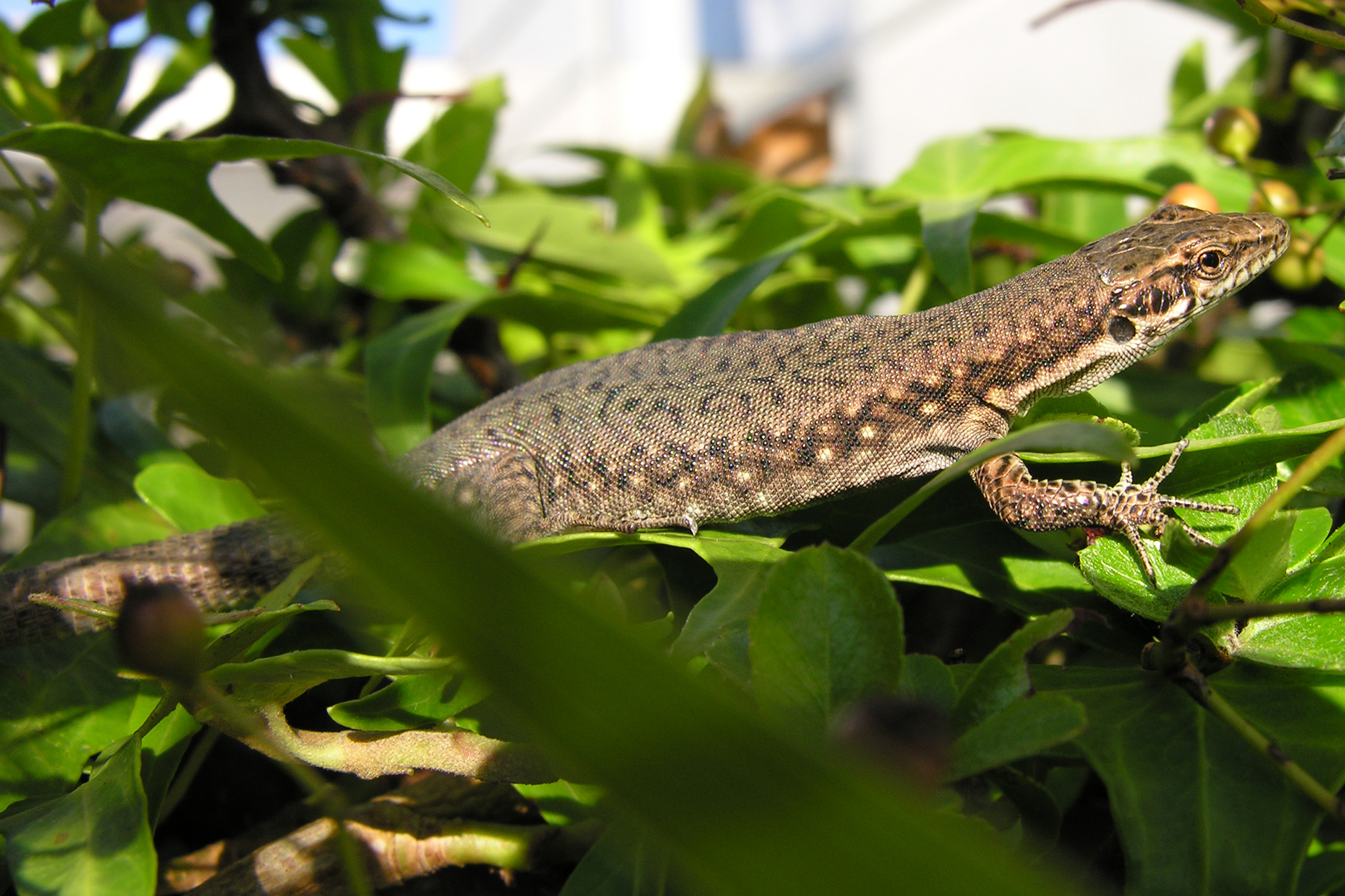

Conservation status
- Near Threatened (IUCN 3.1)

Scientific classification
- Kingdom: Animalia
- Phylum: Chordata
- Class: Reptilia
- Order: Squamata
- Family: Lacertidae
- Genus: Darevskia
- Species: D. dahli

Binomial name
- Darevskia dahli (Darevsky, 1957)

Synonyms
- Lacerta saxicola dahli Darevsky, 1957; Lacerta dahli — Darevsky, 1966; Darevskia dahli — Arribas, 1997

= Darevskia dahli =

Species of lizard

Darevskia dahli is a species of lizard in the family Lacertidae. The species is native to Eastern Europe and Western Asia.

== Etymology ==
The specific name, dahli, is in honor of Russian zoologist Sergei Konstantinovich Dahl.

== Geographic range ==
D. dahli is found in Armenia, Georgia, and Ukraine.

== Habitat ==
The preferred natural habitats of D. dahli are forest and rocky areas, at altitudes of 900–1,700 m (3,000–5,600 ft).

== Reproduction ==
D. dahli is oviparous and parthenogenetic. An adult female may lay a clutch of 2–5 eggs.
