= Darevskia sapphirina =

Conservation status
- Least Concern (IUCN 3.1)

Scientific classification
- Kingdom: Animalia
- Phylum: Chordata
- Class: Reptilia
- Order: Squamata
- Suborder: Lacertoidea
- Family: Lacertidae
- Genus: Darevskia
- Species: D. sapphirina

Binomial name
- Darevskia sapphirina (Schmidtler, Eiselt & Darevsky, 1994)

Synonyms
- Lacerta sapphirina Schmidtler, Eiselt & Darevsky, 1994

Species of lizard

Darevskia sapphirina is a lizard species in the family Lacertidae. It is endemic to eastern Turkey north of Lake Van. It is a rare species with a restricted range. It occurs on rocky and stony open slopes and high steppe habitats at about 2,000 m (6,600 ft) above sea level.
