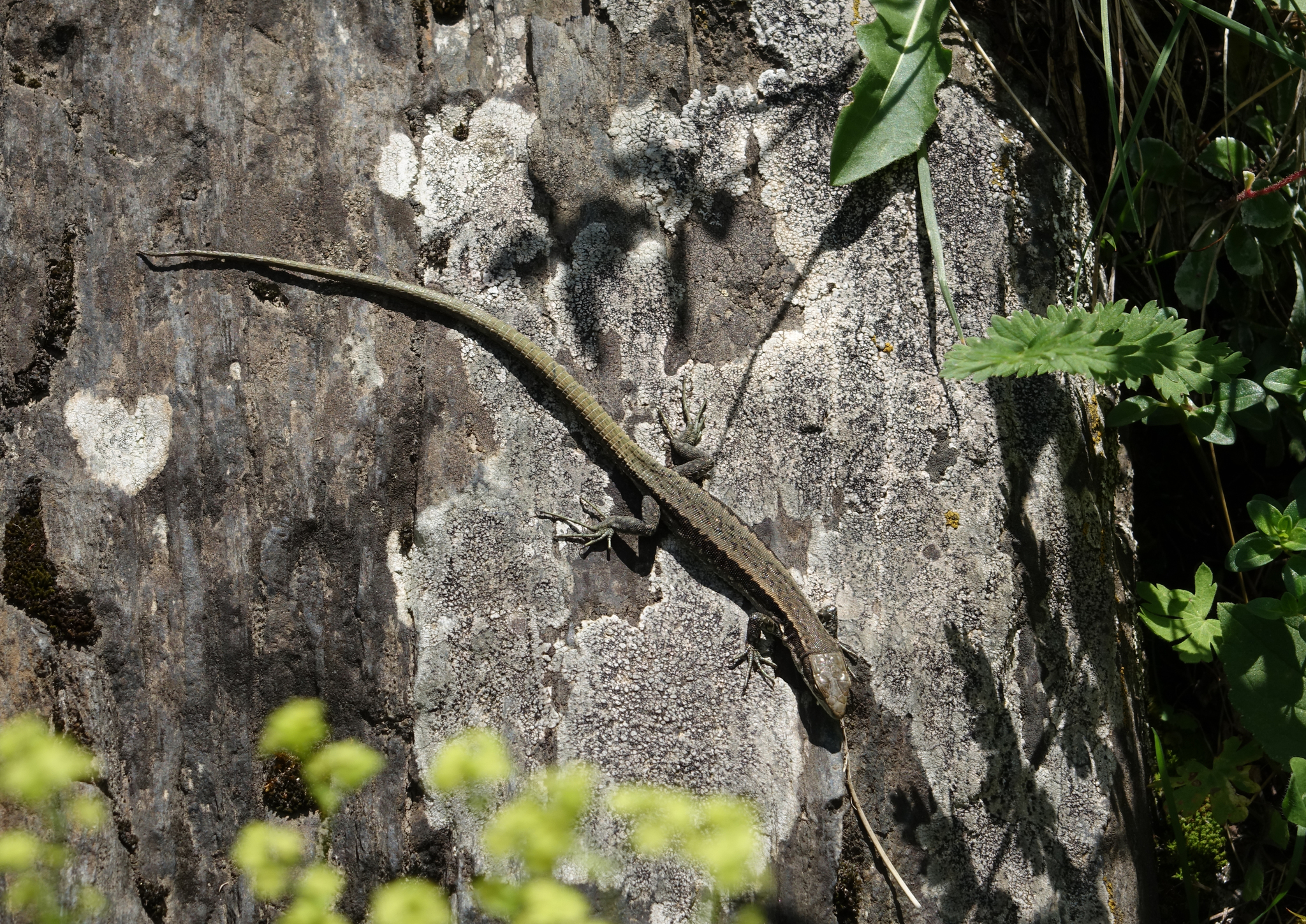

Conservation status
- Least Concern (IUCN 3.1)

Scientific classification
- Domain: Eukaryota
- Kingdom: Animalia
- Phylum: Chordata
- Class: Reptilia
- Order: Squamata
- Family: Lacertidae
- Genus: Darevskia
- Species: D. daghestanica

Binomial name
- Darevskia daghestanica (Darevsky, 1967)

Synonyms
- Lacerta saxicola daghestanica; Lacerta caucasica daghestanica; Lacerta saxicola gracilis; Lacerta daghestanica

= Darevskia daghestanica =

Species of lizard

Darevskia daghestanica is a species of lizard in the family Lacertidae. It is found in Georgia, Azerbaijan, and Russia.
