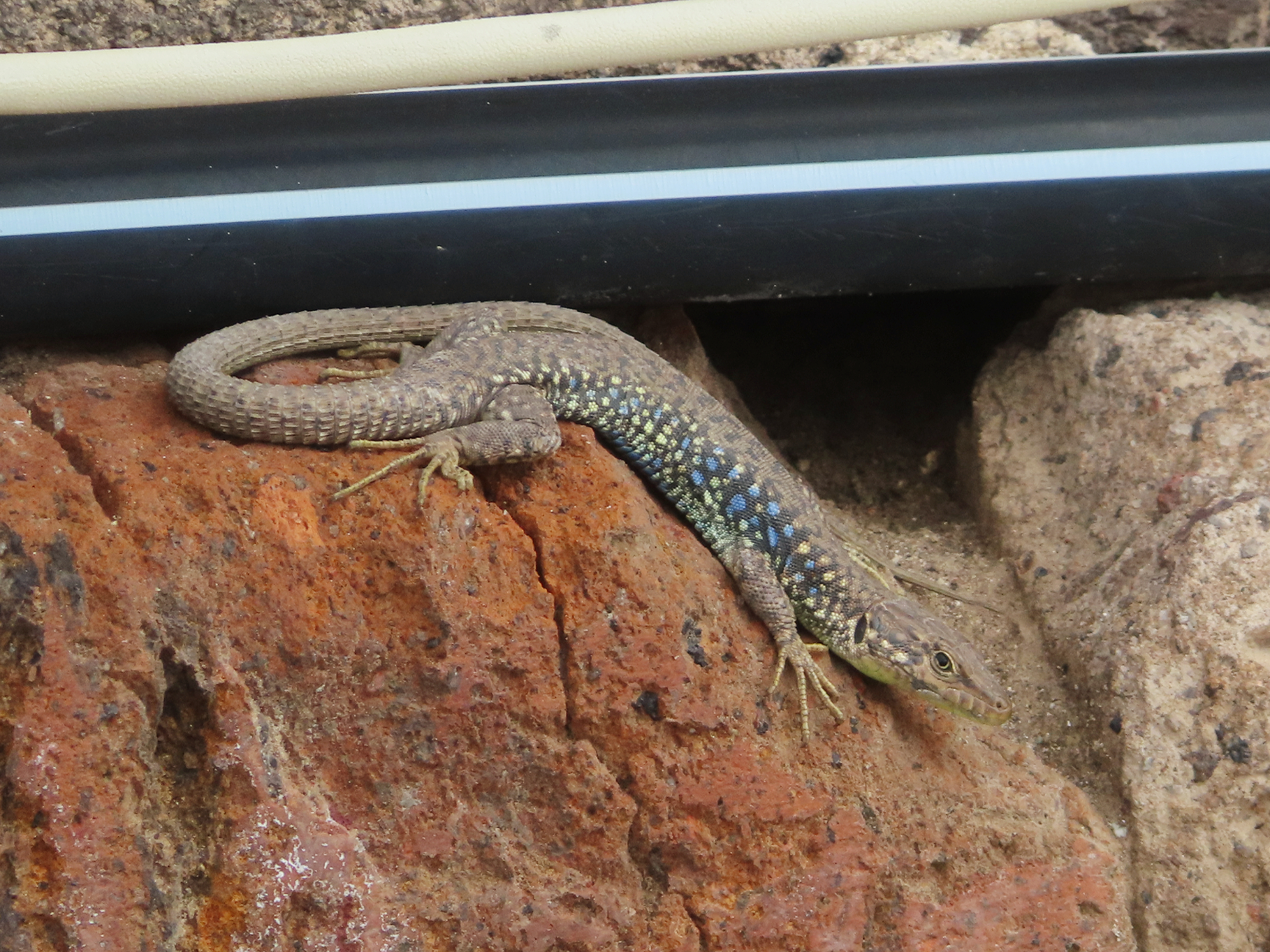
- In Armenia

Scientific classification
- Kingdom: Animalia
- Phylum: Chordata
- Class: Reptilia
- Order: Squamata
- Family: Lacertidae
- Genus: Darevskia
- Species: D. nairensis

Binomial name
- Darevskia nairensis (Darevsky, 1967)

= Darevskia nairensis =

Species of lizard

Darevskia nairensis, the Armenia lizard, is a species of lizard in the family Lacertidae. The species is native to Armenia.
