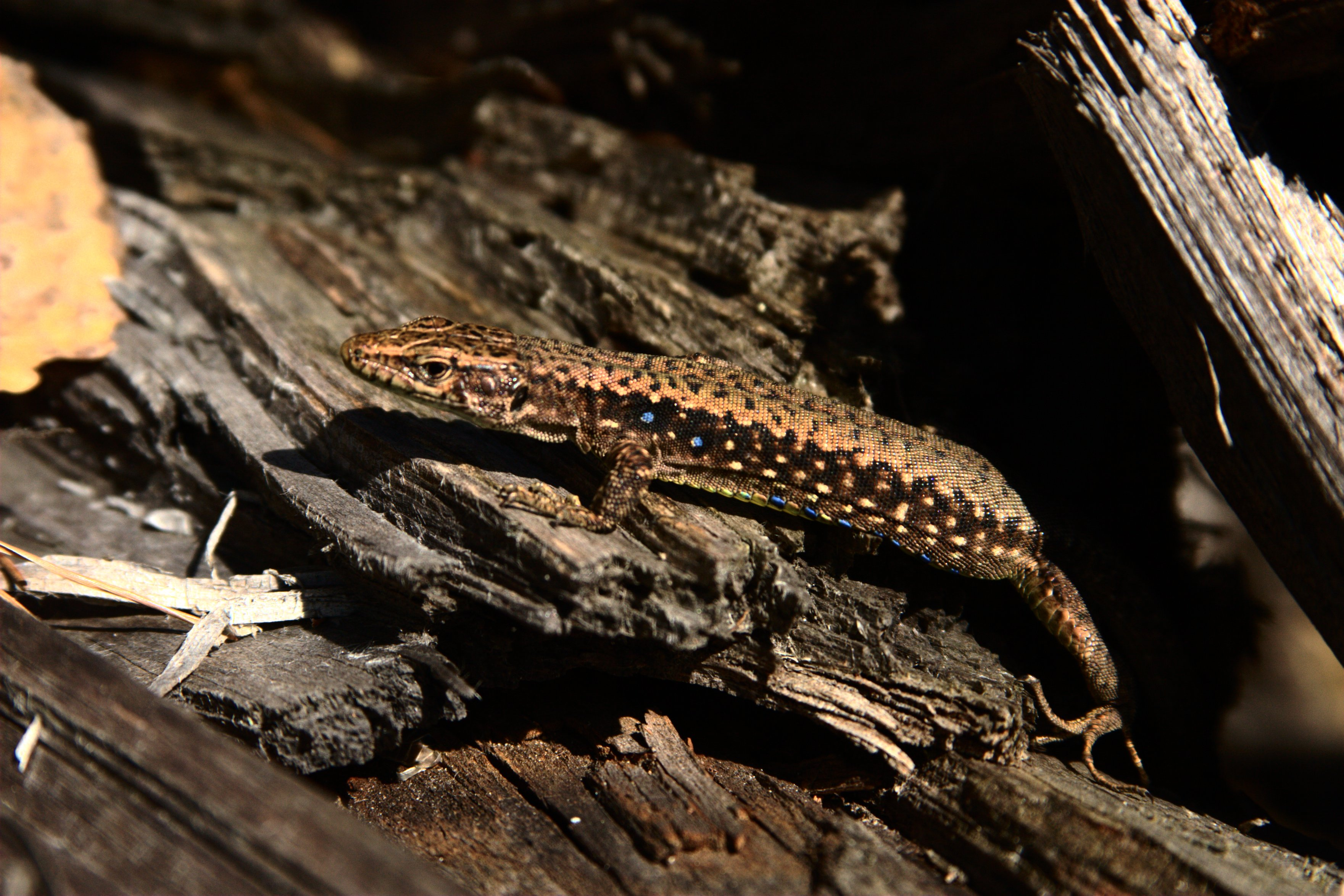

Conservation status
- Least Concern (IUCN 3.1)

Scientific classification
- Kingdom: Animalia
- Phylum: Chordata
- Class: Reptilia
- Order: Squamata
- Suborder: Lacertoidea
- Family: Lacertidae
- Genus: Darevskia
- Species: D. caucasica

Binomial name
- Darevskia caucasica (Méhelÿ, 1909)

Synonyms
- Lacerta caucasica Méhelÿ, 1909

= Darevskia caucasica =

Species of lizard

Darevskia caucasica is a lizard species in the family Lacertidae. It is found in the Caucasus Mountains of Georgia, southern Russia, and Azerbaijan.
