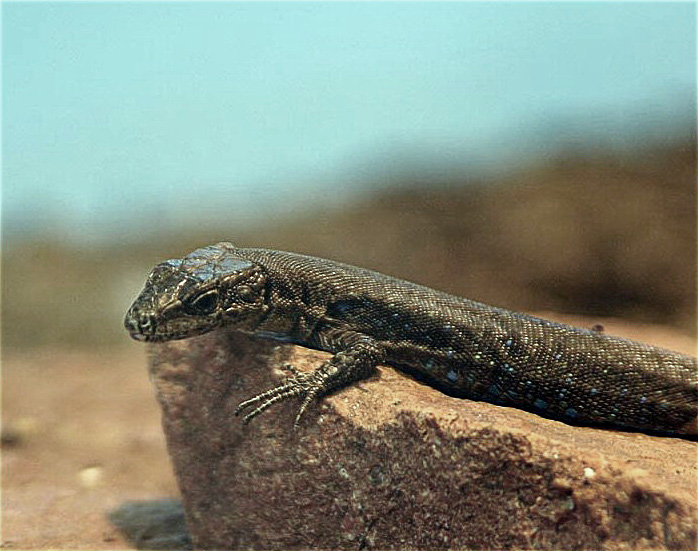

Conservation status
- Least Concern (IUCN 3.1)

Scientific classification
- Kingdom: Animalia
- Phylum: Chordata
- Class: Reptilia
- Order: Squamata
- Family: Lacertidae
- Genus: Darevskia
- Species: D. armeniaca

Binomial name
- Darevskia armeniaca (Méhelÿ, 1909)

Synonyms
- Lacerta saxicola armeniaca Méhelÿ, 1909; Lacerta armeniaca — Fu, Murphy & Darevsky, 1957; Darevskia armeniaca — Arribas, 1997

= Armenian lizard =

Species of reptile

Darevskia armeniaca, commonly known as the Armenian lizard or the Armenian rock lizard, is a parthenogenetic (unisexually breeding) species (or form) of Darevskia, a genus of lizards belonging to the family Lacertidae, the wall lizards. Darevskia armeniaca is native to the Armenian Highland.

== Geographic range ==
It is found in northeastern Turkey, northern and northwestern Armenia, southern Georgia, and western Azerbaijan.

== Gallery ==
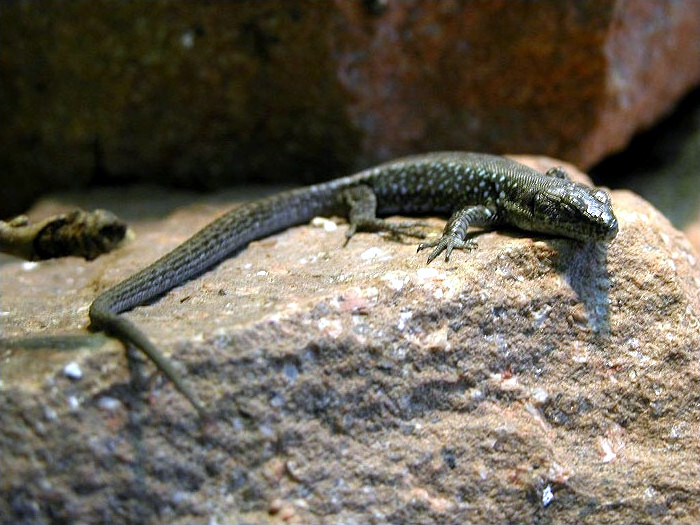
Armenian rock lizard
