= Darevskia chlorogaster =

Conservation status
- Least Concern (IUCN 3.1)

Scientific classification
- Kingdom: Animalia
- Phylum: Chordata
- Class: Reptilia
- Order: Squamata
- Family: Lacertidae
- Genus: Darevskia
- Species: D. chlorogaster

Binomial name
- Darevskia chlorogaster (Boulenger, 1908)

Species of lizard

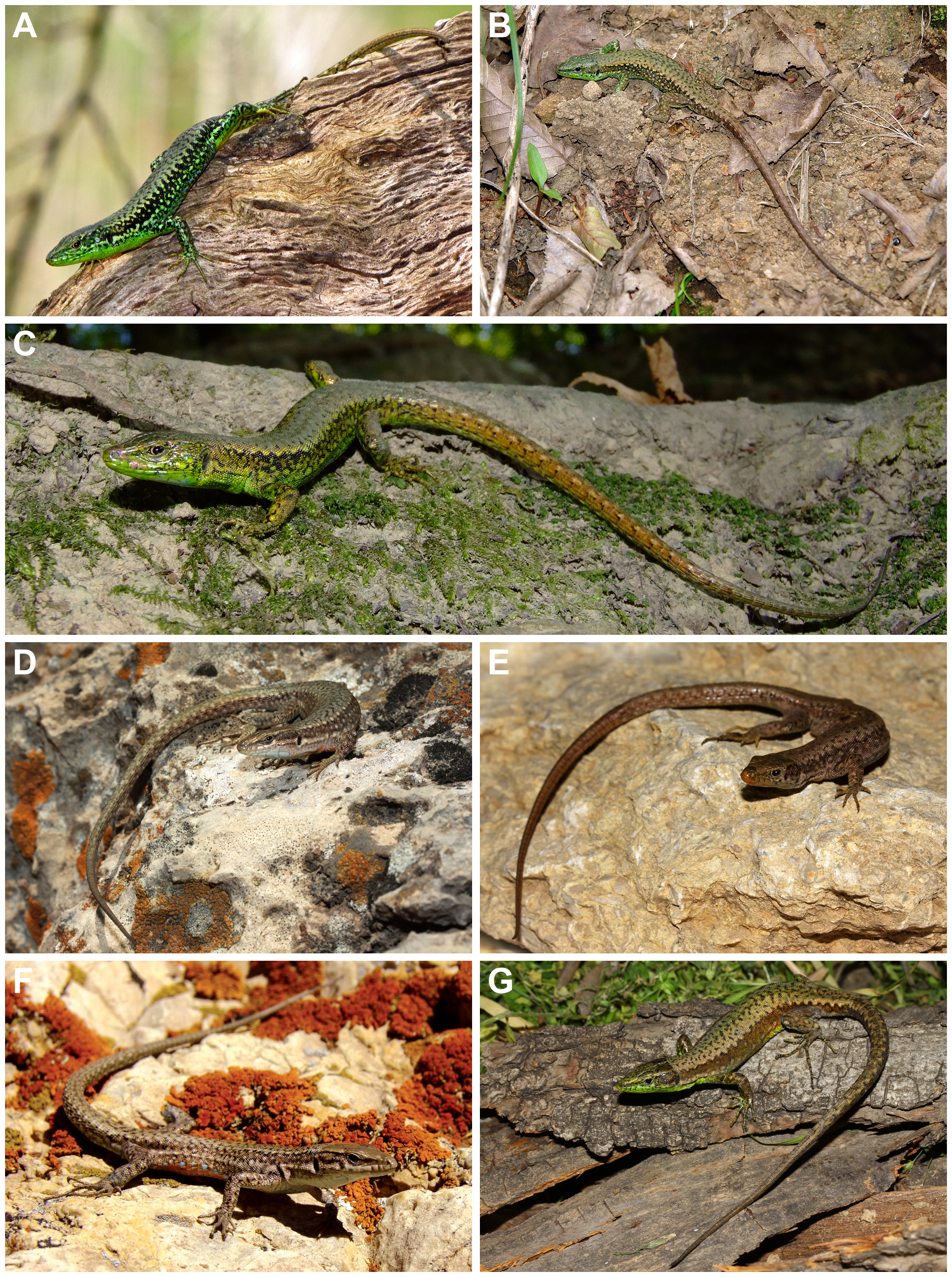
Darevskia chlorogaster (B; photo by M. Auer)

Darevskia chlorogaster, the greenbelly lizard, is a lizard species in the genus of Darevskia. It is found in Azerbaijan and Iran.
