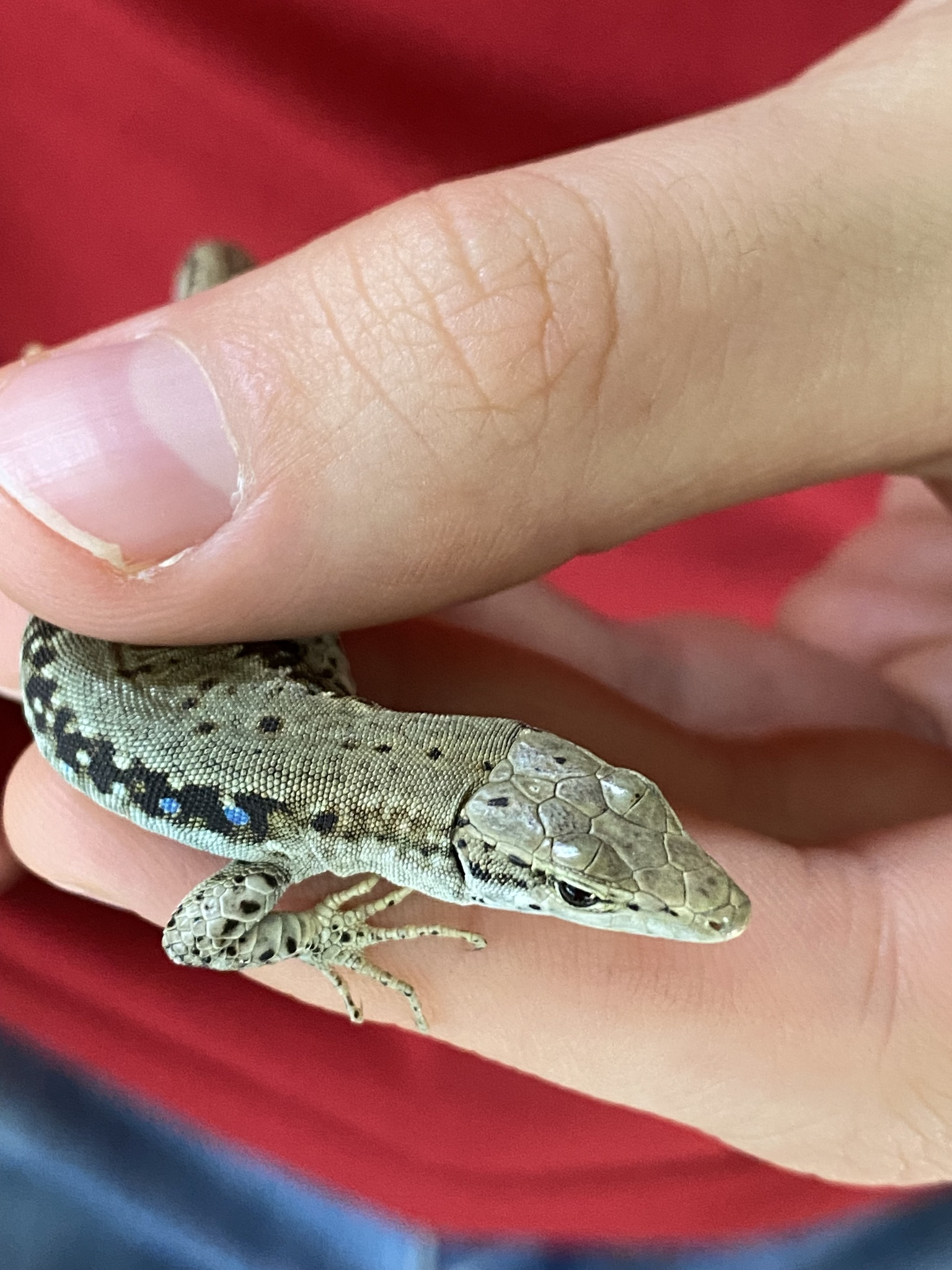

Scientific classification
- Domain: Eukaryota
- Kingdom: Animalia
- Phylum: Chordata
- Class: Reptilia
- Order: Squamata
- Family: Lacertidae
- Genus: Darevskia
- Species: D. szczerbaki

Binomial name
- Darevskia szczerbaki (Lukina, 1963)

Synonyms
- Lacerta saxicola szczerbaki Lukina, 1963; Darevskia brauneri szczerbaki (Lukina, 1963)

= Darevskia szczerbaki =

Species of lizard

Darevskia szczerbaki, also known as Szczerbak's lizard (Russian: ящерица щербака tr. yashcheritsa shcherbaka), is a lizard species in the family Lacertidae. It is endemic to Krasnodar Krai in North Caucasus, Russia, and named after the Soviet herpetologist Mykola Szczerbak.

Its range along the Black Sea is restricted to areas with coastal cliffs, as they are the favored habitat of the lizard, which has difficulty adapting to most other environments. It is classified as an endangered species, and extinction is considered by some herpetologists because of the high amount of human development in the Caucasus coast and its popularity in the illegal lizard trade of Europe. It is rarely preyed upon, as its main two predators are the common kestrel and olive snake.
