= Darevskia dryada =

Conservation status
- Critically Endangered (IUCN 3.1)

Scientific classification
- Domain: Eukaryota
- Kingdom: Animalia
- Phylum: Chordata
- Class: Reptilia
- Order: Squamata
- Family: Lacertidae
- Genus: Darevskia
- Species: D. dryada

Binomial name
- Darevskia dryada (Darevsky & Tuniyev, 1997)

Species of lizard

Darevskia dryada, the Charnali lizard, is a lizard species in the genus Darevskia. It is found in Georgia and Turkey.
