= Darevskia mirabilis =

Scientific classification
- Kingdom: Animalia
- Phylum: Chordata
- Class: Reptilia
- Order: Squamata
- Family: Lacertidae
- Genus: Darevskia
- Species: D. mirabilis

Binomial name
- Darevskia mirabilis Arribas, Ilgaz, Kumluras, Durmus, Avci, & Üzum, 2013

Species of lizard

Darevskia mirabilis is a lizard species in the genus Darevskia. It is found in Turkey.
