= Darevskia salihae =

Scientific classification
- Kingdom: Animalia
- Phylum: Chordata
- Class: Reptilia
- Order: Squamata
- Suborder: Lacertoidea
- Family: Lacertidae
- Genus: Darevskia
- Species: D. salihae

Binomial name
- Darevskia salihae Kurnaz, Şahin & Eroğlu, 2022

Species of lizard

Darevskia salihae, also known as Saliha's rock lizard, is a lizard species in the family Lacertidae. It is endemic to the Artvin Province in northeastern Turkey and known from a coniferous forest area dominated by Picea orientalis at about 1,531 m (5,023 ft) above sea level.

Darevskia salihae measures 52–59 mm (2.0–2.3 in) in snout–vent length.

Morphologically, D. salihae is smaller than other species of the genus and can be distinguished by the absence of blue spots on the flanks and ventral plates, a low number of dorsal scales at midbody, and the lack of carinated (keeled) scales on the tibia. Its dorsal coloration is generally brown to gray without greenish tones, and individuals exhibit no blue pigmentation above the forelimbs, a feature common in related species such as D. rudis and D. valentini.

Genetic analyses based on a 503-base-pair fragment of the mitochondrial cytochrome b gene indicate that D. salihae represents a distinct evolutionary lineage within the Darevskia rudis–valentini–portschinskii group. The species differs by approximately 4% uncorrected genetic distance from these close relatives and forms a separate subclade supported by high bootstrap (100) and posterior probability (1.00) values. The phylogenetic tree places D. salihae as a sister lineage to the rudis–valentini–portschinskii clade, confirming its status as an independent species.

The isolation of D. salihae is believed to have resulted from geological processes such as valley collapse and partial uplift of the Kaçkar Mountains, which limited gene flow between populations of Darevskia lizards. The species likely evolved in situ as an ancient relict of a formerly widespread population. Due to its limited range and habitat specialization, D. salihae may be vulnerable to environmental changes, making it of potential conservation concern.
