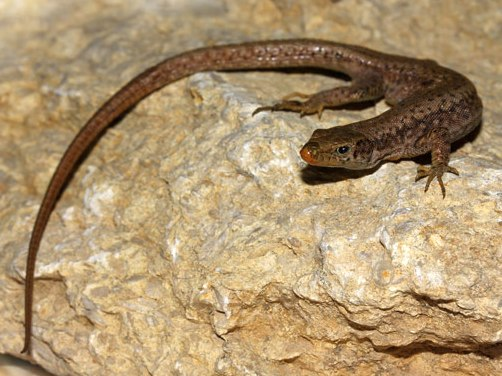

Conservation status
- Endangered (IUCN 3.1)

Scientific classification
- Domain: Eukaryota
- Kingdom: Animalia
- Phylum: Chordata
- Class: Reptilia
- Order: Squamata
- Family: Lacertidae
- Genus: Darevskia
- Species: D. kopetdaghica

Binomial name
- Darevskia kopetdaghica Ahmadzadeh et al., 2013

= Darevskia kopetdaghica =

Species of lizard

Darevskia kopetdaghica is a lizard species in the genus Darevskia. It is endemic to Iran.
