= Darevskia obscura =

Scientific classification
- Domain: Eukaryota
- Kingdom: Animalia
- Phylum: Chordata
- Class: Reptilia
- Order: Squamata
- Family: Lacertidae
- Genus: Darevskia
- Species: D. obscura

Binomial name
- Darevskia obscura Lantz & Cyrén, 1936

Species of lizard

Darevskia obscura is a lizard species in the genus Darevskia. It is found in Georgia and Turkey.
