= Darevskia steineri =

Conservation status
- Data Deficient (IUCN 3.1)

Scientific classification
- Kingdom: Animalia
- Phylum: Chordata
- Class: Reptilia
- Order: Squamata
- Family: Lacertidae
- Genus: Darevskia
- Species: D. steineri

Binomial name
- Darevskia steineri (Eiselt, 1995)

Synonyms
- Lacerta steineri Eiselt, 1995; Lacerta (Archaeolacerta) steineri — Tiedemann & Grillitsch, 1999; Darevskia steineri — Arnold, Arribas & Carranza, 2007

Species of lizard

Darevskia steineri, also known commonly as Steiner's lizard, is a species of lizard in the family Lacertidae. The species is endemic to Iran.

== Etymology ==
The specific name, steineri, is in honor of Austrian herpetologist Hans M. Steiner.

== Geographic range ==
D. steineri is found in northeastern Iran.

== Habitat ==
The preferred natural habitats of D. steineri are forest and rocky areas. It can be found on tree trunks and the forest floor in the Hyrcanian forest.

== Description ==
D. steineri may attain a snout-to-vent length of 7 cm (2.8 in). It has a greenish belly, unlike the reddish bellies of closely related species.

== Reproduction ==
D. steineri is oviparous.
