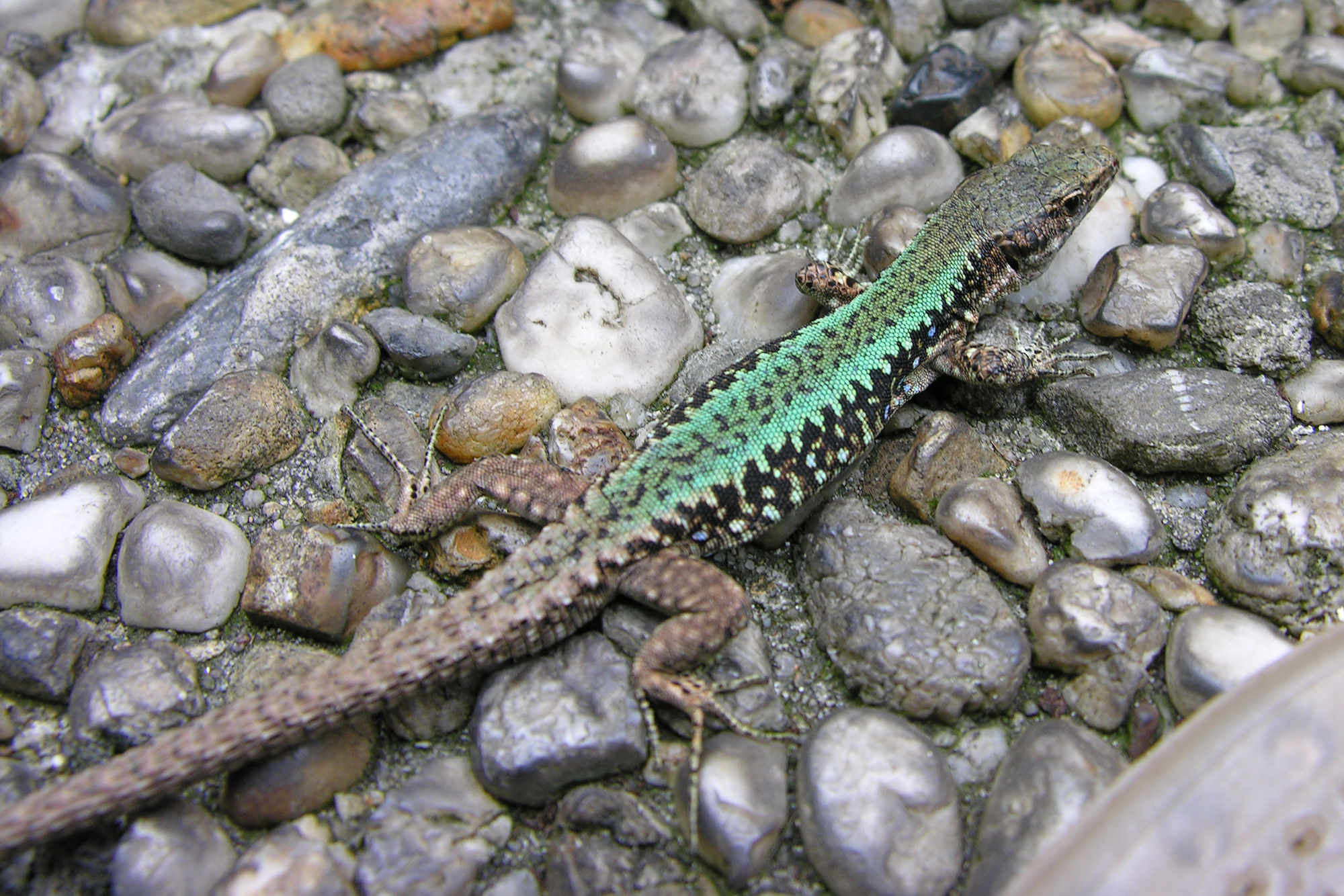

Conservation status
- Near Threatened (IUCN 3.1)

Scientific classification
- Domain: Eukaryota
- Kingdom: Animalia
- Phylum: Chordata
- Class: Reptilia
- Order: Squamata
- Family: Lacertidae
- Genus: Darevskia
- Species: D. mixta

Binomial name
- Darevskia mixta (Méhelÿ, 1909)

= Darevskia mixta =

Species of lizard

Darevskia mixta is a lizard species in the genus Darevskia. It is endemic to Georgia.
