= Darevskia aghasyani =

Scientific classification
- Domain: Eukaryota
- Kingdom: Animalia
- Phylum: Chordata
- Class: Reptilia
- Order: Squamata
- Family: Lacertidae
- Genus: Darevskia
- Species: D. aghasyani

Binomial name
- Darevskia aghasyani Tuniyev & Petrova, 2019

Species of lizard

Darevskia aghasyani is a lizard species in the genus Darevskia. It is endemic to Armenia.
