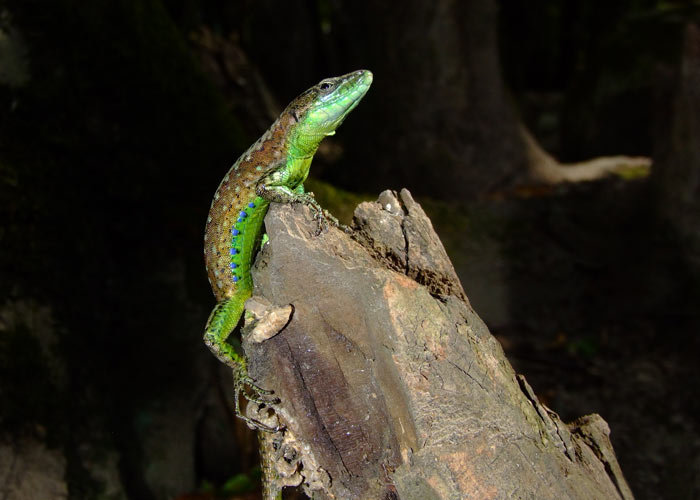

Scientific classification
- Kingdom: Animalia
- Phylum: Chordata
- Class: Reptilia
- Order: Squamata
- Suborder: Lacertoidea
- Family: Lacertidae
- Genus: Darevskia
- Species: D. kamii

Binomial name
- Darevskia kamii Ahmadzadeh et al., 2013

= Darevskia kamii =

Species of lizard

Darevskia kamii is a lizard species in the family Lacertidae. It is endemic to Golestan in northern Iran. It occurs on tree trunks and forest floor within the Hyrcanian forests.

Males can grow to 69 mm (2.7 in) and females to 64 mm (2.5 in) in snout–vent length.
