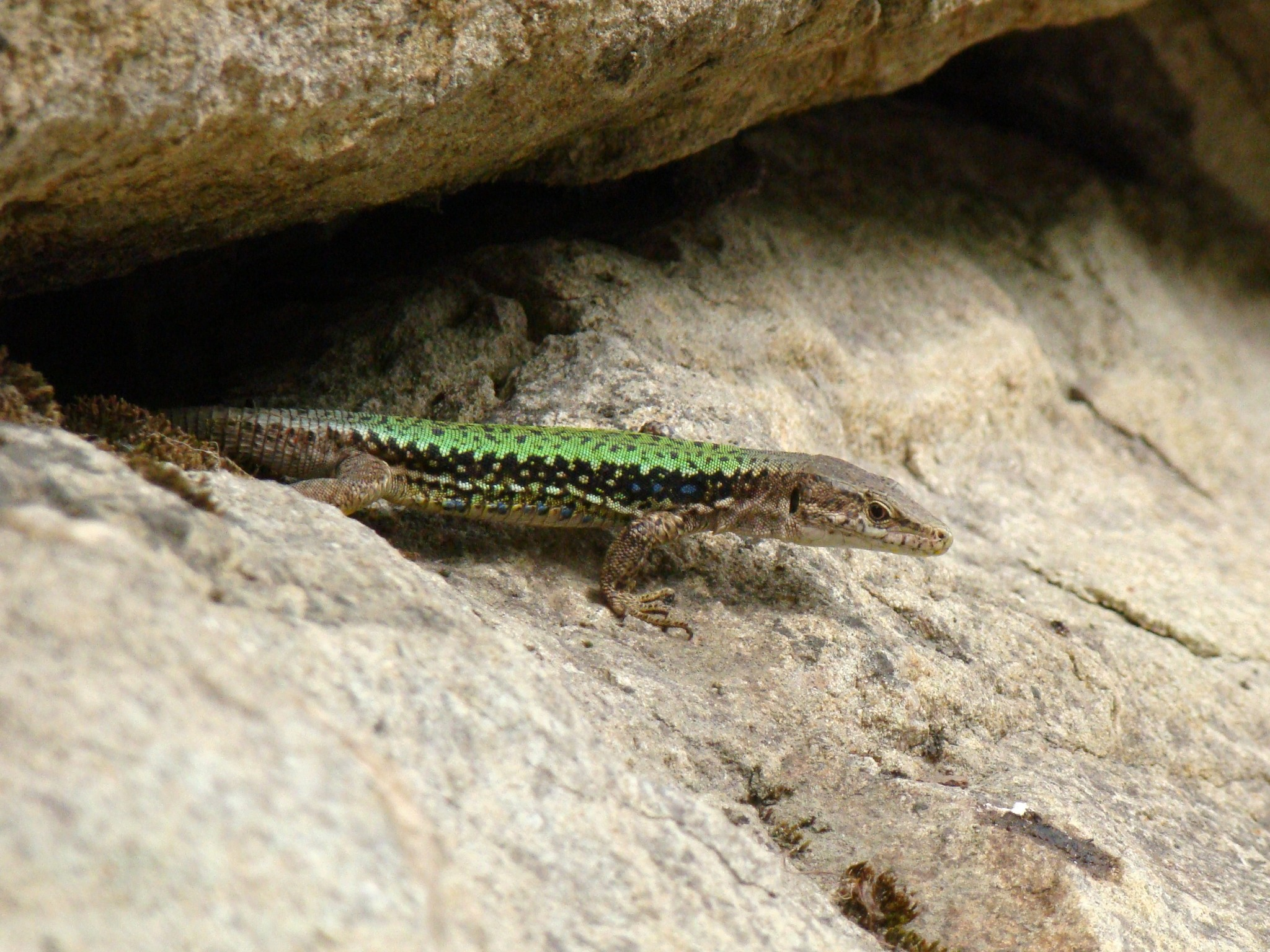

Conservation status
- Least Concern (IUCN 3.1)

Scientific classification
- Domain: Eukaryota
- Kingdom: Animalia
- Phylum: Chordata
- Class: Reptilia
- Order: Squamata
- Family: Lacertidae
- Genus: Darevskia
- Species: D. brauneri

Binomial name
- Darevskia brauneri (Méhelÿ, 1909)

= Darevskia brauneri =

Species of lizard

Darevskia brauneri, Brauner's rock lizard, is a lizard species in the genus Darevskia. It is found in Georgia and Russia.
