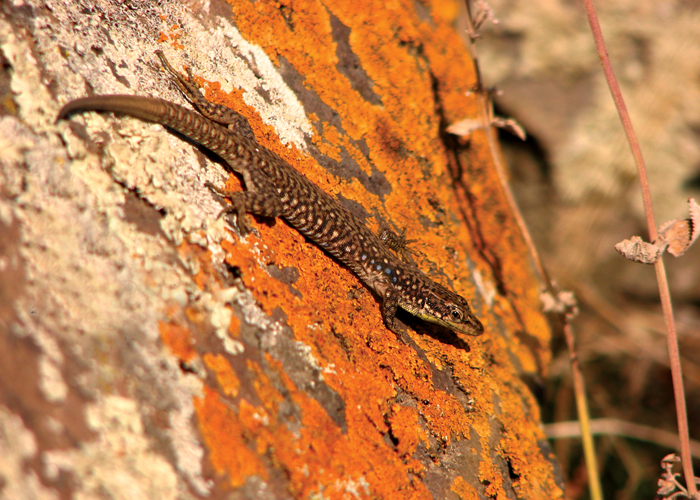

Conservation status
- Least Concern (IUCN 3.1)

Scientific classification
- Kingdom: Animalia
- Phylum: Chordata
- Class: Reptilia
- Order: Squamata
- Family: Lacertidae
- Genus: Darevskia
- Species: D. raddei

Binomial name
- Darevskia raddei (Boettger, 1892)

= Darevskia raddei =

Species of lizard

Darevskia raddei, known commonly as the Azerbaijan lizard, is a species of lizard in the family Lacertidae. The species is endemic to Eurasia. There are three subspecies.

== Etymology ==
The specific name, raddei, is in honor of German naturalist Gustav Radde.

== Geographic range ==
D. raddei is found in Armenia, Azerbaijan, Georgia, Iran, and Turkey.

== Habitat ==
D. raddei is found at altitudes of 600–2,500 m (2,000–8,200 ft) in a variety of habitats including forest, shrubland, grassland and rocky areas.

== Subspecies ==
Three subspecies are recognized as being valid, including the nominotypical subspecies.

- Darevskia raddei chaldoranensis N. Rastegar-Pouyani, Karamiani, Oraei, Khosrawani & E. Rastegar-Pouyani, 2011
- Darevskia raddei raddei (Boettger, 1892)
- Darevskia raddei vanensis (Eiselt, J.F. Schmidtler & Darevsky, 1993)

Nota bene: A trinomial authority in parentheses indicates that the subspecies was originally described in a genus other than Darevskia.
