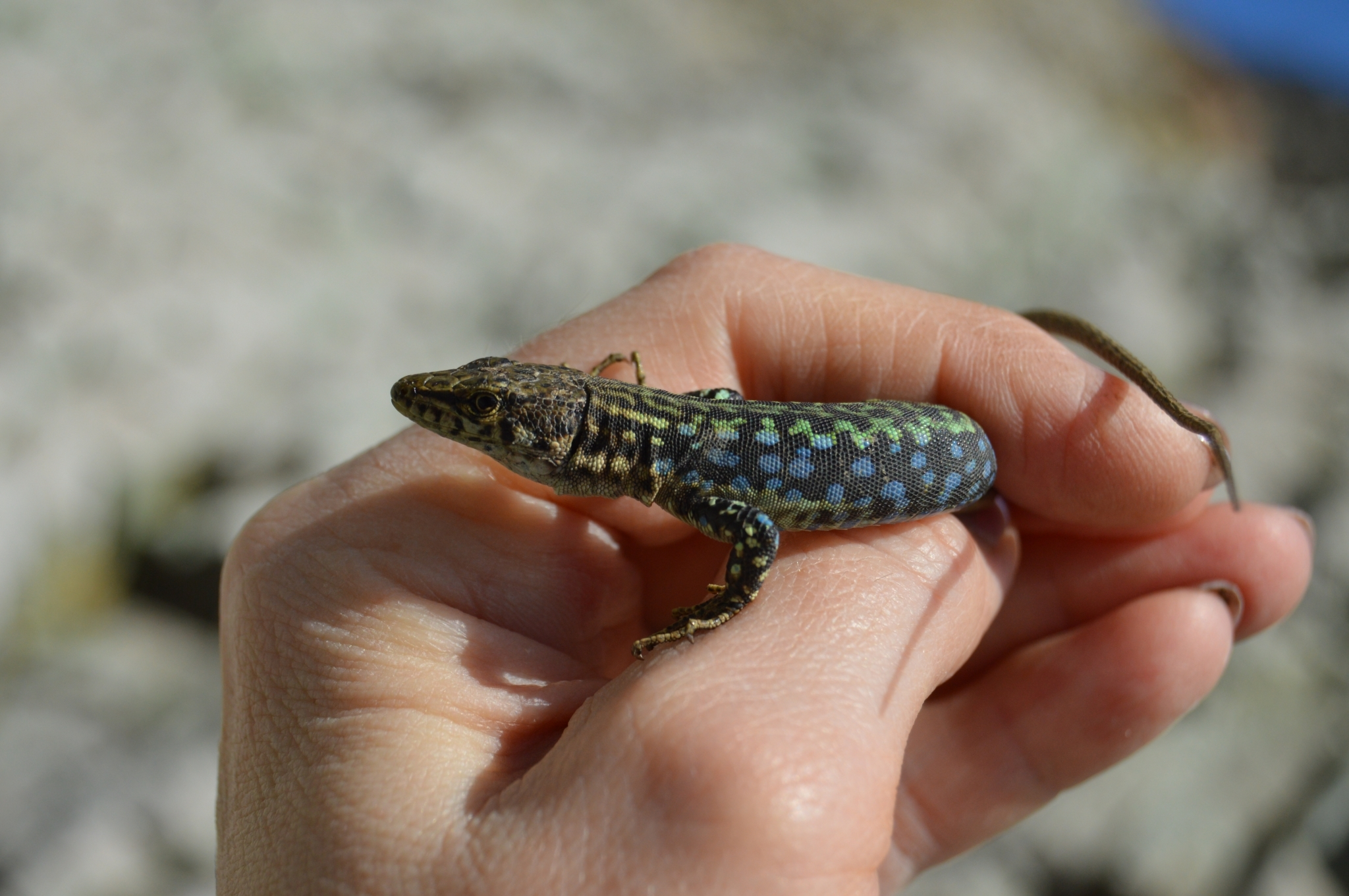

Scientific classification
- Kingdom: Animalia
- Phylum: Chordata
- Class: Reptilia
- Order: Squamata
- Family: Lacertidae
- Genus: Darevskia
- Species: D. lindholmi

Binomial name
- Darevskia lindholmi (Szczerbak, 1962)

= Crimean rock lizard =

Species of lizard

The Crimean rock lizard (Darevskia lindholmi) is a lizard species in the genus Darevskia. It is endemic to Ukraine.
