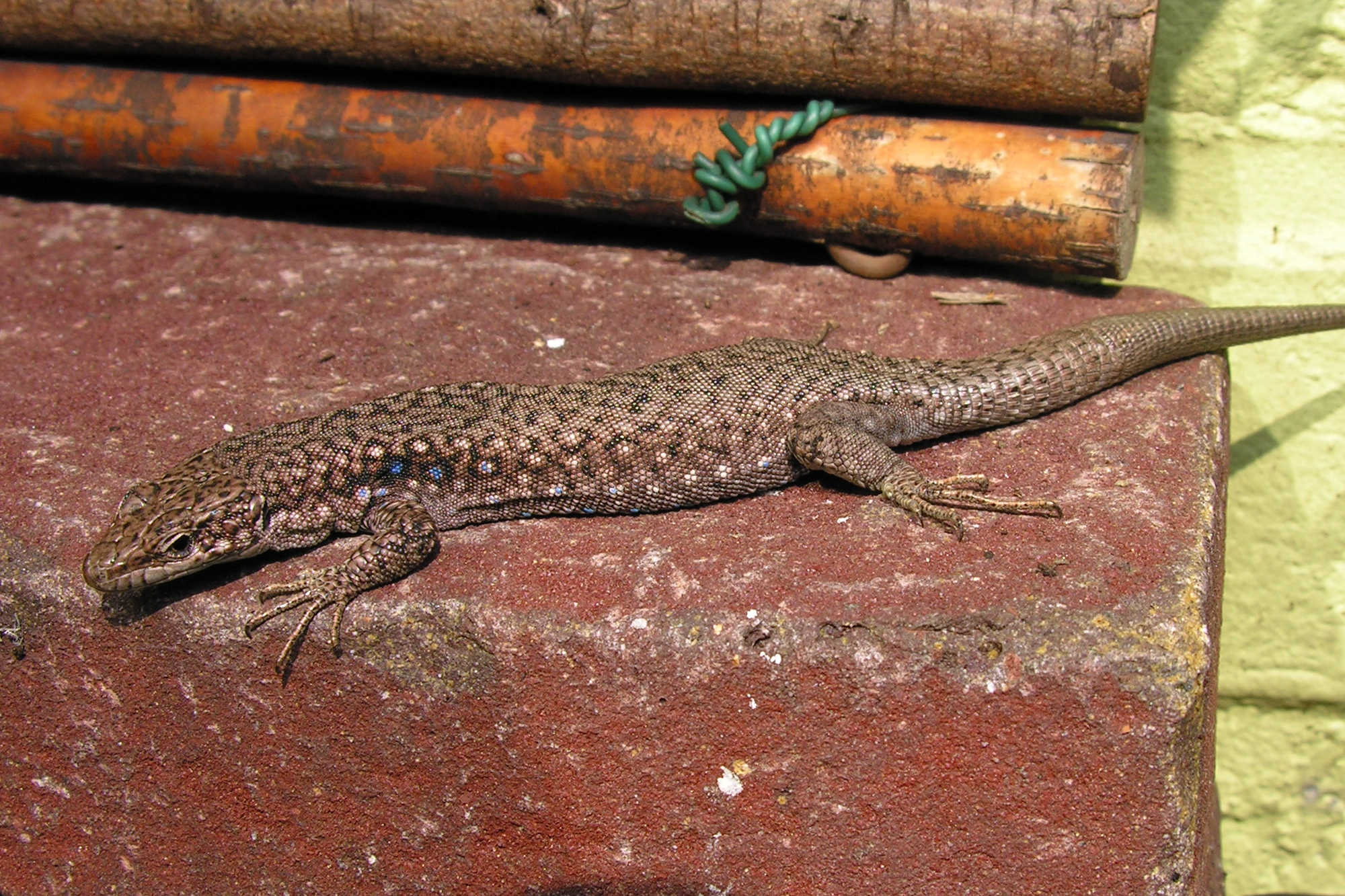

Conservation status
- Near Threatened (IUCN 3.1)

Scientific classification
- Domain: Eukaryota
- Kingdom: Animalia
- Phylum: Chordata
- Class: Reptilia
- Order: Squamata
- Family: Lacertidae
- Genus: Darevskia
- Species: D. unisexualis

Binomial name
- Darevskia unisexualis (Darevsky, 1966)

= Darevskia unisexualis =

Species of lizard

Darevskia unisexualis is a lizard species in the genus Darevskia. It is found in Armenia, Georgia, and Turkey.

D. unisexualis is capable of parthenogenetic reproduction by oogenesis in female only lineages. During the prophase I stage of meiosis homeologous chromosomes (originally inherited from two different parental species) undergo synapsis. A protein MLH1 employed in DNA mismatch repair also appears to be involved in this meiotic process.
