= Darevskia tuniyevi =

Scientific classification
- Kingdom: Animalia
- Phylum: Chordata
- Class: Reptilia
- Order: Squamata
- Family: Lacertidae
- Genus: Darevskia
- Species: D. tuniyevi

Binomial name
- Darevskia tuniyevi Arribas, Candan, Jurnaz, Kumlutaş, Caynak, & Ilgaz, 2022

Species of lizard

Darevskia tuniyevi is a lizard species in the genus Darevskia. It is found in Turkey.
