= Darevskia josefschmidtleri =

Scientific classification
- Kingdom: Animalia
- Phylum: Chordata
- Class: Reptilia
- Order: Squamata
- Family: Lacertidae
- Genus: Darevskia
- Species: D. josefschmidtleri

Binomial name
- Darevskia josefschmidtleri Arribas, Candan, Kornilios, Ayaz, Kumlutas, Gul, Yilmaz, Caynak, & Ilgaz, 2022

Species of lizard

Darevskia josefschmidtleri is a lizard species in the genus Darevskia. It is found in Turkey.
