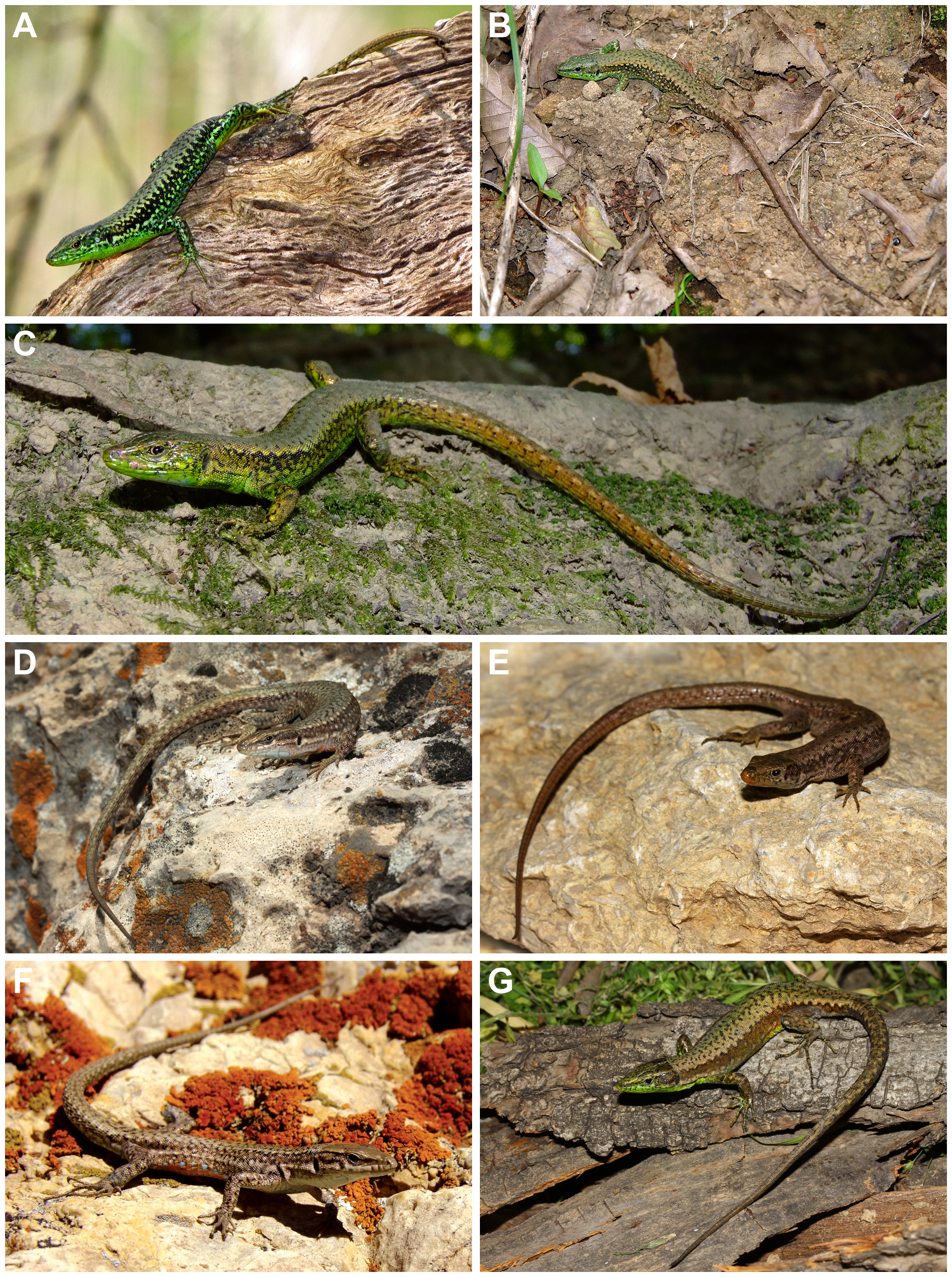
- Darevskia species in life: Darevskia caspica (A; photo by N. Moradi); Darevskia chlorogaster (B; photo by M. Auer); Darevskia kamii (C; photo by O. Mozaffari); Darevskia defilippii (D; photo by A. Shahrdari) Darevskia kopetdaghica (E; photo by O. Moz

Scientific classification
- Kingdom: Animalia
- Phylum: Chordata
- Class: Reptilia
- Order: Squamata
- Suborder: Lacertoidea
- Family: Lacertidae
- Genus: Darevskia
- Species: D. caspica

Binomial name
- Darevskia caspica Ahmadzadeh et al., 2013

= Darevskia caspica =

Species of lizard

Darevskia caspica is a lizard species in the Lacertidae. It is endemic to Mazandaran in northern Iran. It occurs on tree trunks and forest floor within the Hyrcanian forests.

Males can grow to 66 mm (2.6 in) and females to 67 mm (2.6 in) in snout–vent length.
