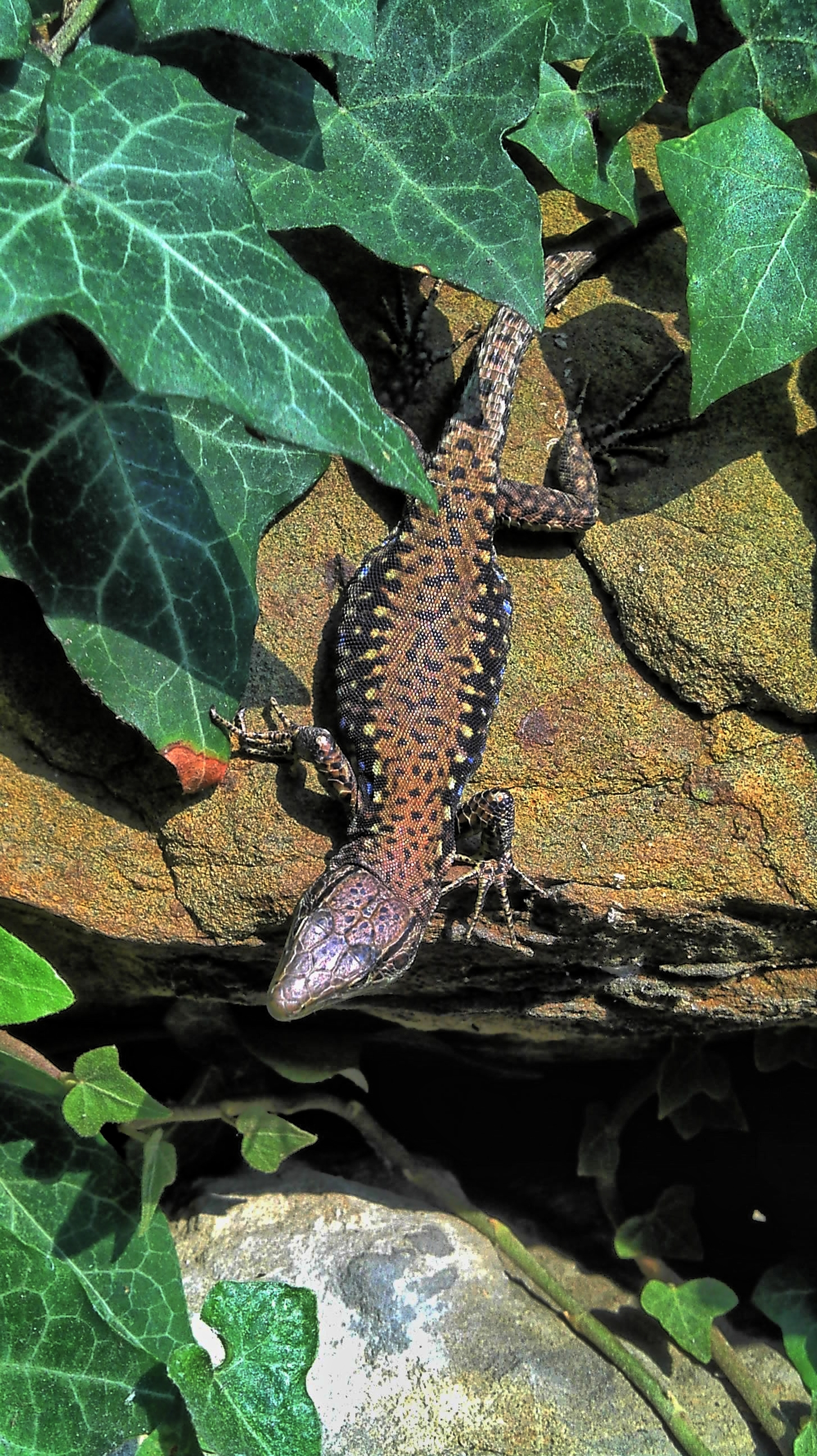
- Darevskia raddei

Scientific classification
- Kingdom: Animalia
- Phylum: Chordata
- Class: Reptilia
- Order: Squamata
- Family: Lacertidae
- Subfamily: Lacertinae
- Genus: Darevskia; Arribas, 1999

= Darevskia =

Genus of lizards

Darevskia is a genus of lizards of the family Lacertidae known colloquially as rock lizards or meadow lizards. Member species are native to the Caucasus, Iran and Turkey, living in forest and grassy habitats with numerous rock outcrops. Among rock lizards, seven parthenogenetic species are known.

== Description ==
Darevskia species are small lizards with a head and body length of 50–85 mm (2.0–3.3 in), and with a tail length about two times longer. The body is usually flattened, the head is pointed in shape and in most species flattened in a vertical plane, which allows lizards to hide in narrow crevices between stones and rocks. Rock lizards have relatively long legs with special calluses on the inner surfaces of the paws and sharp claws, thanks to which they quickly move along the vertical rough surfaces of rocks and stones.

The color of rock lizards varies from different tones of green to sand. Females are usually colored paler than males. On the dorsal side of the body, rock lizards have an occipital stripe composed of a set of black or brown spots and a wide line of the lizard's main color, and dark patterns on the sides of the body. In some species, blue or violet spots with white circles in the center and / or monotonous blue-violet spots at the junction of the abdominal scutes with trunk scales are located on the anterior third of the body. Most types of rock lizards are characterized by a diverse color of the abdominal side of the body, ranging from various shades of pink, red and orange to yellow and green.

== Etymology ==
The generic name, Darevskia, is in honor of Russian herpetologist Ilya Sergeyevich Darevsky.

== Taxonomy and systematics ==
In 1830, a professor at Kazan University, Eduard Friedrich Eversmann (1794–1860) made an expedition to the North Caucasus. As a result of which he described two new species: a meadow lizard, Lacerta praticola (Eversmann, 1834), and a rock lizard Lacerta saxicola (Eversmann, 1834). At that time, European scientists did not recognize the independence of the species L. saxicola, considering it as part of the European L. muralis (Laurenti, 1768). But at the beginning of the XX century between the two zoologists Lajos Méhelÿ (1862–1953) and George Albert Boulenger (1858–1937) there was a lengthy discussion about the taxonomic position of L. saxicola, which was resolved in favor of the former, and L. saxicola and subspecies were further considered separately from L. muralis. For several decades, scientists from different countries studied the monophyletic group of rock lizards independently, highlighting new subspecies, simplifying some taxa and describing new species. It was on this group of lizards that the phenomenon of parthenogenesis in amniotic vertebrates was first discovered by the Russian zoologist Ilya Sergeyevich Darevsky (1924–2009), who also made a significant contribution to understanding the ecology, systematics, and morphology of rock lizards. In 1997, the Spanish scientist Oscar J. Arribas named the genus of rock lizards Darevskia and designated the type species as D. saxicola.

== Cladistics ==
According to Arribas (1997), the genus Darevskia includes four groups (clades), combining species by origin and kinship: “raddei”, “rudis”, “saxicola” and “caucasica”. Subsequently, three more clades were identified: “praticola”, “chlorogaster”, and “defilippii”. In total, the genus includes 35 species, 7 of which breed parthenogenetically, and 22 subspecies.

Raddei	Rudis	Saxicola	Caucasica
Darevskia raddei (Boettger, 1892)	Darevskia rudis (Bedriaga, 1886)	Darevskia saxicola (Eversmann, 1834)	Darevskia caucasica (Mehely, 1909)
Darevskia nairensis (Darevsky, 1967)	Darevskia parvula (Lantz & Cyren, 1913)	Darevskia brauneri (Mehely, 1909)	Darevskia alpina (Darevsky, 1967)
Darevskia bithynica (Mehely, 1909)	Darevskia valentini (Boettger, 1892)	Darevskia sczerbaki (Lukina, 1963)	Darevskia daghestanica (Darevsky, 1967)
Darevskia clarkorum (Darevsky & Vedmederja, 1977)	Darevskia portschinskii (Kessler, 1878)	Darevskia lindholmi (Lantz & Cyren, 1936)	Darevskia derjugini (Nikolsky, 1898)
Darevskia mixta (Mehely, 1909)	Darevskia tuniyevi Arribas, Candan, Jurnaz, Kumlutaş, Caynak, & Ilgaz, 2022		
Darevskia dryada (Darevsky & Tuniyev, 1997)	Darevskia adjarica (Darevsky & Eiselt, 1980)		

Praticola	Chlorogaster	Defilippii	Parthenogenetic species
Darevskia praticola (Eversmann, 1834)	Darevskia chlorogaster (Boulenger, 1908)	Darevskia defilippii (Camerano, 1877)	Darevskia armeniaca (Mehely, 1909)
	Darevskia kamii Ahmadzadeh, Flecks, Carretero, Mozaffari, Bohme, Harris, Freitas & Rodder, 2013	Darevskia kopetdaghica Ahmadzadeh, Flecks, Carretero, Mozaffari, Bohme, Harris, Freitas, Rodder, 2013	Darevskia bendimahiensis (Schmidtler, Eiselt & Darevsky, 1994)
	Darevskia caspica Ahmadzadeh, Flecks, Carretero, Mozaffari, Bohme, Harris, Freitas & Rodder, 2013	Darevskia schaekeli Ahmadzadeh, Flecks, Carretero, Mozaffari, Bohme, Harris, Freitas & Rodder, 2013	Darevskia dahli(Darevsky, 1957)
		Darevskia steineri (Eiselt, 1995)	Darevskia rostombekowi (Darevsky, 1957)
			Darevskia unisexualis (Darevsky, 1966)
			Darevskia uzzelli (Darevsky & Danielyan, 1977)
			Darevskia sapphirina (Schmidtler, Eiselt & Darevsky, 1994)

== Species ==
The following species are recognized as being valid.

- Darevskia adjarica (Darevsky & Eiselt, 1980)
- Darevskia aghasyani (Tuniyev & Petrova, 2019)
- Darevskia alpina (Darevsky, 1967)
- Darevskia armeniaca (Méhelÿ, 1909) – Armenian lizard
- Darevskia arribasi (Tuniyev, Petrova & Lotiev, 2023) – Arribas’ rock lizard
- Darevskia bendimahiensis (Schmidtler, Eiselt & Darevsky, 1994)
- Darevskia bithynica (Méhelÿ, 1909)
- Darevskia brauneri (Méhelÿ, 1909) – Brauner's rock lizard
- Darevskia caspica Ahmadzadeh et al., 2013
- Darevskia caucasica (Méhelÿ, 1909)
- Darevskia chlorogaster (Boulenger, 1908) – greenbelly lizard
- Darevskia clarkorum (Darevsky & Vedmederja, 1977)
- Darevskia daghestanica (Darevsky, 1967)
- Darevskia dahli (Darevsky, 1957)
- Darevskia defilippii (Camerano, 1877) – Elburs lizard
- Darevskia derjugini (Nikolsky, 1898)
- Darevskia dryada (Darevsky & Tuniyev, 1997) – Charnali lizard
- Darevskia josefschmidtleri (Arribas, Candan, Kornilios, Ayaz, Kumlutas, Gul, Yilmaz, Caynak, & Ilgaz, 2022)
- Darevskia kamii (Ahmadzadeh et al., 2013)
- Darevskia kopetdaghica (Ahmadzadeh et al., 2013)
- Darevskia lindholmi (Szczerbak, 1962)
- Darevskia mirabilis (Arribas, Ilgaz, Kumluras, Durmus, Avci, & Üzum, 2013)
- Darevskia mixta (Méhelÿ, 1909)
- Darevskia obscura (Lantz & Cyrén, 1936)
- Darevskia parvula (Lantz & Cyrén, 1913) – red-bellied lizard
- Darevskia portschinskii (Kessler, 1878)
- Darevskia praticola (Eversmann, 1834) – meadow lizard
- Darevskia raddei (Boettger, 1892) – Azerbaijan lizard
- Darevskia rostombekowi (Darevsky, 1957)
- Darevskia rudis (Bedriaga, 1886)
- Darevskia salihae (Kurnaz, Şahin & Eroğlu, 2022)
- Darevskia sapphirina (Schmidtler, Eiselt & Darevsky, 1994)
- Darevskia saxicola (Eversmann, 1834)
- Darevskia schaekeli (Ahmadzadeh et al., 2013)
- Darevskia spitzenbergerae (Eiselt, Darevsky, & Schmidtler, 1992) - Caucasian rock lizard, Valentin's lizard
- Darevskia steineri (Eiselt, 1995) – Steiner's lizard
- Darevskia szczerbaki (Lukina, 1963) – Szczerbak's lizard
- Darevskia unisexualis (Darevsky, 1966)
- Darevskia uzzelli (Darevsky & Danielyan, 1977)
- Darevskia valentini (Boettger, 1892) – Caucasian rock lizard, Valentin's lizard

Nota bene: A binomial authority in parentheses indicates that the species was originally described in a genus other than Darevskia.

== Distribution ==
Rock lizards are common in Abkhazia, Azerbaijan, Armenia, Georgia, Iran, Nagorno-Karabakh, Russia (Adygea, Dagestan, Ingushetia, Kabardino-Balkaria, Karachay-Cherkessia, Krasnodar Territory, Republic of Crimea, North Ossetia-Alania, Stavropol Territory and Chechnya), in Turkey and South Ossetia. It is worth noting that the boundaries of the range of some species are not reliably known, but the expected areas of their encounters coincide with the already indicated distribution sites for the whole genus

== Habitat ==
Rock lizards are found in various high-altitude zones from 0 to 3,000 m (0 to 9,843 ft) above sea level and occupy a variety of landscapes: mountain-steppe, forest-steppe, mountain meadow, mountain forest, anthropogenic and coastal. By confinement to one or another habitat, they can be conditionally divided into several groups:

1) Lizards living in the forest, according to the occupied microreliefs, are divided into: adhering to rock outcrops (D. raddei, D. brauneri) and independent of them, able to live in habitats in which there are no rocks, using rodent burrows as shelters, deciduous litter, cavities in trees and bark (e.g. D. chlorogaster, D. armeniaca).

2) Inhabitants in areas of bedrock outcrops and clayey cliffs in alpine and subalpine meadows. As shelters, they often use rodent burrows, cavities between stones and cracks in the rocks. These habitats are adhered to by D. alpina and D. mixta, D. armeniaca and D. valentini.

3) Rock lizards of dry and moderately dry landscapes (alpine steppes) of rocks and their feet on slopes with dry-loving shrubbery and grassy vegetation, road slopes. Such habitats have a large number of crevices and voids serving as shelters for lizards. Such species are found in such landscapes as: D. rudis, D. portschinski, D. daghestanica, D. raddei, D. saxicola.

4) Occupying anthropogenic habitats: an abandoned building, walls in cities, abandoned temples, monasteries, etc., where their number often exceeds that in natural habitats. For example, D. armeniaca, D. lindholmi, D. dahli.

Rock lizards are found at heights of 0 – 3000 m above sea level. Zonal and geographical distribution is determined by the amount of precipitation, average annual temperature, duration of the adverse season, and exposure of the slope. For example, D. daghestanica on the southern slope of the Greater Caucasus Mountain Range (South Ossetia) is distributed at altitudes of 1,500–1,800 m (4,900–5,900 ft) above sea level, and on the northern slopes (Dagestan) at 50–2,100 m (160–6,890 ft) above sea level.

== Nutrition ==
Rock lizards feed on various invertebrates with a body size from a few millimeters to 4 cm (1.6 in): spiders, diptera, lepidoptera, hymenoptera, cockroaches, orthoptera, semi-rigid-winged, coleoptera, wood lice, worms, slugs, marine and freshwater amphipods, caddis flies, chironomids and sometimes parts of plants. Also, particular cases of cannibalism were recorded when adults ate juvenile individuals.

Despite the diversity of the food supply, rock lizards can develop preferences for feeding on invertebrates of a certain group (for example, flying forms of ants), which is caused by seasonal changes in the availability or abundance of this type of prey. Even after a significant reduction in the density of invertebrates of this group, lizards continue to hunt for them for some time in the presence of more accessible food objects.

== Population density and spatial structure of the population ==
Rock lizards are extremely rare on their own, usually forming settlements. The population density of parthenogenetic rock lizards can vary in a wider range than that of bisexual species: up to 200 individuals per 1 km of the route in unisexual species and up to 80 individuals in bisexual species, which is explained by the fact that parthenogenetic species are less aggressive and have a high population growth rate.

Rock lizards are characterized by complex and diverse social systems, which, in particular, are characterized by stable long-term friendly relations between the male and the female and territorial or hierarchical relations between individuals of the same sex.

The basis of the settlements of bisexual rock lizards are sedentary males and females with individual sites, often overlapping. In a number of species, some males possess territories protected from other males. The territories of males never overlap, but their centers of activity, primarily associated with basking, coincide with the centers of activity of females that live within their territories.

The study of the social behavior and spatial structure of rock lizard populations has been the subject of a number of scientific papers published based on the results of many years of research

== Activity ==
The seasonal activity of rock lizards is determined by temperature indicators. Therefore, species living at different heights differ in terms of exit from wintering shelters, mating period, laying of eggs, hatching of young individuals and time of leaving for wintering. Around the end of February until the end of May, exit from wintering shelters occurs, and the active period is from 6–7 months (in the mountains) and up to 9–10 months (in the valleys and on the seashore). During this period, mature individuals mate, and females lay eggs. Hibernation takes place from late September to mid November.

The beginning and end of the daily activity of the lizard is determined by the lighting conditions within the individual area, and in some individuals it can start early in the morning, while individuals living on the slopes of the northern exposure or in deep forest valleys are active for several hours in the middle of the day [4]. After heating (basking), the body temperature of the lizard reaches about 30–34 °C (86–93 °F), and it begins a routine activity aimed at supporting the body. Late in the evening, when the heat subsides, the animals return to the basking places and stay there for some time, after which they go to their night shelters.

== Reproduction ==
Rock lizards reach maturity in the second (females) and third (males) year of life with a total life expectancy of up to 13 years. Mating of some species of rock lizards occurs after the first molt, approximately 3–5 weeks after leaving wintering (D. brauneri), in others, immediately after leaving wintering shelter (D. valentini). Egg laying begins in the second half of June and lasts until early August. Clutch size is usually 2 to 7 eggs. The incubation period lasts approximately 55–65 days. Young animals with a snout-to-vent length (SVL) of about 25 mm (0.98 in) are born in late summer.

== The evolution and origin of parthenogenetic species of Darevskia ==
Separation of the genus Darevskia from the subfamily Lacertinae occurred approximately 12-16 million years ago, in the middle of the Miocene. Presumably, the ancestral form of the genus Darevskia penetrated the territory of the Western Caucasus in the Middle Miocene or in the Middle Pliocene, when there was a land connection between Asia Minor and the Balkans.

The genus of rock lizards has 7 parthenogenetic species: D. armeniaca, D. bendimahiensis, D. dahli, D. rostombekovi, D. sapphirina, D. unisexualis and D. uzzelli, resulting from the hybridization of males and females of different bisexual species. Moreover, D. valentini and D. portschinskii always enter as paternal species, and D. mixta, D. nairensis, D. raddei always enter as maternal species. From the point of view of the classical concept of a species, homosexual taxa cannot be assigned a species status due to the lack of exchange of genetic material between individuals within the same population. However, on the basis of morphological and cytogenetic characters, they are assigned a species rank.

The appearance of parthenogenetic species is usually associated with the last, Wurm glaciation. Parthenogenetic rock lizards appeared about 10 thousand years ago when, due to the formation of mountain glaciers, the habitats of the parent bisexual species were disturbed, which led to the overlap of their ranges and the hybridogenic formation of parthenogenetic individuals better adapted to the conditions of short summers and long winters. Due to the doubled reproduction rate and successful resettlement, same-sex populations later began to exist independently of the parent species.

Hybridization occurs in places where the ranges of parthenogenetic and bisexual species overlap, resulting in the appearance of triploid sterile females and a small number of males, with changes in the reproductive system (malfunctions in the formation of reproductive products, hermaphroditism). Nevertheless, presumably, these males are able to give offspring, which leads to the appearance of tetraploid hybrids. Sometimes males emerge from unfertilized eggs laid by parthenogenetic females. Like males of hybrid origin, they have reproductive disorders, which may not interfere with their offspring. A small amount of parthenogenetic female males emerging from clutches is explained by frequently occurring mutations incompatible with life.

Despite the fact that as a result of parthenogenesis, individuals are born that receive hereditary material only from the mother's body, a small intraspecific genetic diversity has been revealed due to mutational processes, genetic instability and the appearance of same-sex species as a result of repeated and independent crossing of parental species among themselves.

== See also ==
- Cnemidophorus, another lizard genus containing several parthenogenic species.
