= Darevskia clarkorum =

Conservation status
- Endangered (IUCN 3.1)

Scientific classification
- Kingdom: Animalia
- Phylum: Chordata
- Class: Reptilia
- Order: Squamata
- Family: Lacertidae
- Genus: Darevskia
- Species: D. clarkorum

Binomial name
- Darevskia clarkorum (Darevsky & Vedmederja, 1977)

Synonyms
- Lacerta clarkorum Darevsky & Vedmederja, 1977; Darevskia clarkorum — Arribas, 1997; Archaeolacerta (Caucasilacerta) clarkorum — Sindaco et al., 2000; Darevskia clarkorum — Bischoff, 2007; Lacerta (Darevskia) clarkorum — Sindaco & Jeremčenko, 2008

Species of lizard

Darevskia clarkorum is a species of lizard in the family Lacertidae. The species is native to the Republic of Georgia and Turkey.

== Etymology ==
The specific name, clarkorum (genitive plural), is in honor of British zoologists Richard J. Clark and Erica D. Clark, who are husband and wife.

== Geographic range ==
D. clarkorum is found in Adjara in southwestern Georgia, and also in adjacent northeastern Turkey.

== Habitat ==
The preferred natural habitats of D. clarkorum are forest and rocky areas, at altitudes of 1,500–2,200 m (4,900–7,200 ft).

== Reproduction ==
D. clarkorum is oviparous.
