= Darevskia uzzelli =

Conservation status
- Endangered (IUCN 3.1)

Scientific classification
- Kingdom: Animalia
- Phylum: Chordata
- Class: Reptilia
- Order: Squamata
- Family: Lacertidae
- Genus: Darevskia
- Species: D. uzzelli

Binomial name
- Darevskia uzzelli (Darevsky & Danielyan, 1977)

Synonyms
- Lacerta uzzelli Darevsky & Danielyan, 1977; Darevskia uzzelli — Arribas, 1997; Archaeolacerta (Caucasilacerta) uzzelli — Sindaco et al., 2000; Lacerta (Darevskia) uzzelli — Sindaco & Jeremčenko, 2008; Darevskia uzzelli — W. Böhme, 2014

Species of lizard

Darevskia uzzelli is a species of lizard in the family Lacertidae. The species is endemic to Turkey.

== Etymology ==
The specific name, uzzelli, is in honor of American herpetologist Thomas Marshall Uzzell, Jr. (born 1932).

== Geographic range ==
D. uzzelli is found northeastern Turkey. The type locality is Kars, Turkey.

== Habitat ==
The preferred natural habitats of D. uzzelli are forest and rocky areas, at an altitude of 2,200 m (7,200 ft).

== Reproduction ==
D. uzzelli reproduces by parthenogenesis.
