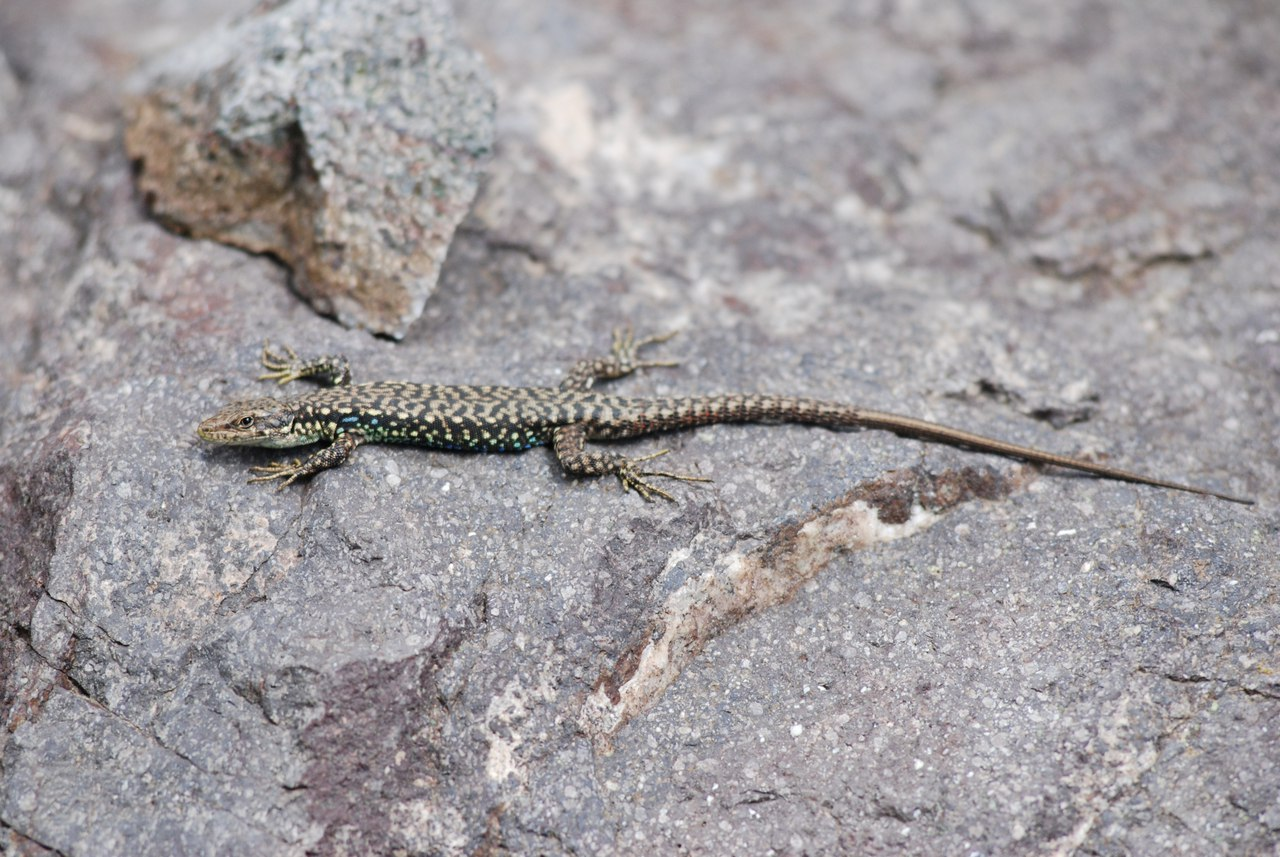

Conservation status
- Least Concern (IUCN 3.1)

Scientific classification
- Kingdom: Animalia
- Phylum: Chordata
- Class: Reptilia
- Order: Squamata
- Family: Lacertidae
- Genus: Darevskia
- Species: D. portschinskii

Binomial name
- Darevskia portschinskii (Kessler, 1878)

Synonyms
- Lacerta portschinskii Kessler, 1878; Lacerta muralis var. portschinskii — Boulenger, 1904; Lacerta saxicola var. portchinskii — Nikolsky, 1913; Lacerta (Zootoca) portschinskii — Bischoff, 1978; Darevskia portschinskii — Arribas, 1997

= Darevskia portschinskii =

Species of lizard

Darevskia portschinskii is a species of lizard in the family Lacertidae. The species is endemic to the South Caucasus region of Eurasia. There are two recognized subspecies.

== Etymology ==
The specific name, portschinskii, is in honor of Russian entomologist Josef Aloizievitsch Portschinski (1848–1916).

== Geographic range ==
D. portschinskii is found in Armenia, Azerbaijan, and Georgia.

== Habitat ==
The natural habitats of D. portschinskii are rocky areas and shrubland at altitudes of 300–1,700 m (980–5,580 ft).

== Reproduction ==
D. portschinskii is oviparous.

== Subspecies ==
The following two subspecies, including the nominotypical subspecies, are recognized as being valid.

- Darevskia portschinskii nigrita (Bakradze, 1976)
- Darevskia portschinskii portschinskii (Kessler, 1878)
