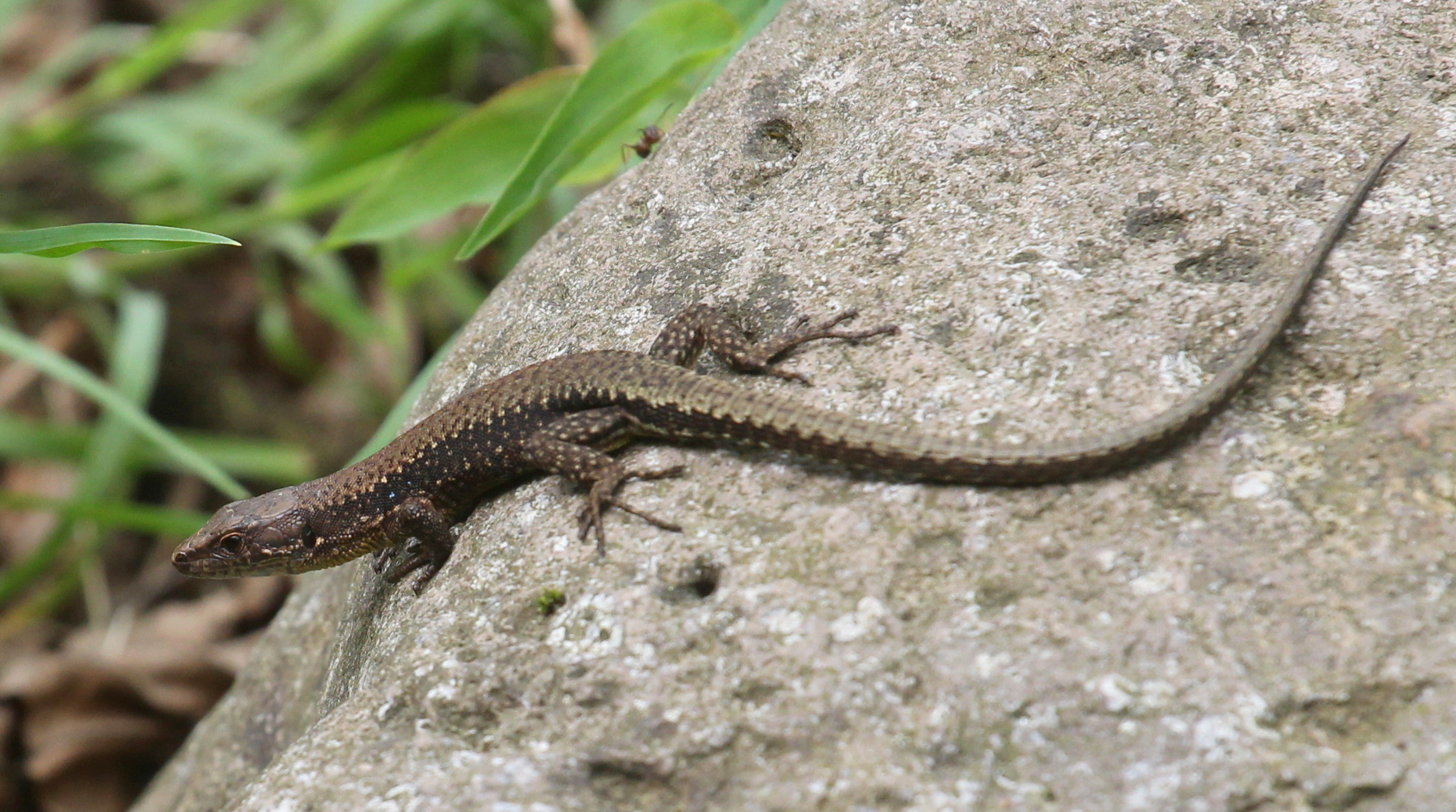

Conservation status
- Near Threatened (IUCN 3.1)

Scientific classification
- Kingdom: Animalia
- Phylum: Chordata
- Class: Reptilia
- Order: Squamata
- Family: Lacertidae
- Genus: Darevskia
- Species: D. derjugini

Binomial name
- Darevskia derjugini (Nikolsky, 1898)

Synonyms
- Lacerta derjugini Nikolsky, 1898; Darevskia derjugini — Arribas, 1997; Archaeolacerta (Caucasilacerta) derjugini — Sindaco et al., 2000; Lacerta (Darevskia) derjugini — Sindaco & Jeremčenko, 2008; Darevskia derjugini — Speybroeck et al., 2020

= Darevskia derjugini =

Species of lizard

Darevskia derjugini is a species of lizard in the family Lacertidae. The species is native to Southeast Europe and Western Asia. There are six recognized subspecies.

== Etymology ==
The specific name, derjugini, is in honor of Russian hydrobiologist Konstantin Michailovich Derjugin.

== Geographic range ==
D. derjugini is found in Azerbaijan, Georgia, southwestern Russia, and Turkey.

== Habitat ==
The preferred natural habitat of D. derjugini is forest, at altitudes of 600–1,700 m (2,000–5,600 ft).

== Reproduction ==
D. derjugini is oviparous. Clutch size is four to eight eggs.

== Subspecies ==
Six subspecies are recognized as being valid, including the nominotypical subspecies.

- Darevskia derjugini abchasica (Bischoff, 1982)
- Darevskia derjugini barani (Bischoff, 1982)
- Darevskis derjugini boehmei (Bischoff, 1982)
- Darevskia derjugini derjugini (Nikolsky, 1998)
- Darevskia derjugini orlowae (Bischoff, 1984)
- Darevskia derjugini silvatica (Bartenef & Reznikova, 1931)
