= Darevskia parvula =

Conservation status
- Least Concern (IUCN 3.1)

Scientific classification
- Domain: Eukaryota
- Kingdom: Animalia
- Phylum: Chordata
- Class: Reptilia
- Order: Squamata
- Family: Lacertidae
- Genus: Darevskia
- Species: D. parvula

Binomial name
- Darevskia parvula (Lantz & Cyrén, 1913)

Species of lizard

Darevskia parvula, the red-bellied lizard, is a lizard species in the genus Darevskia. It is found in Georgia and Turkey.
