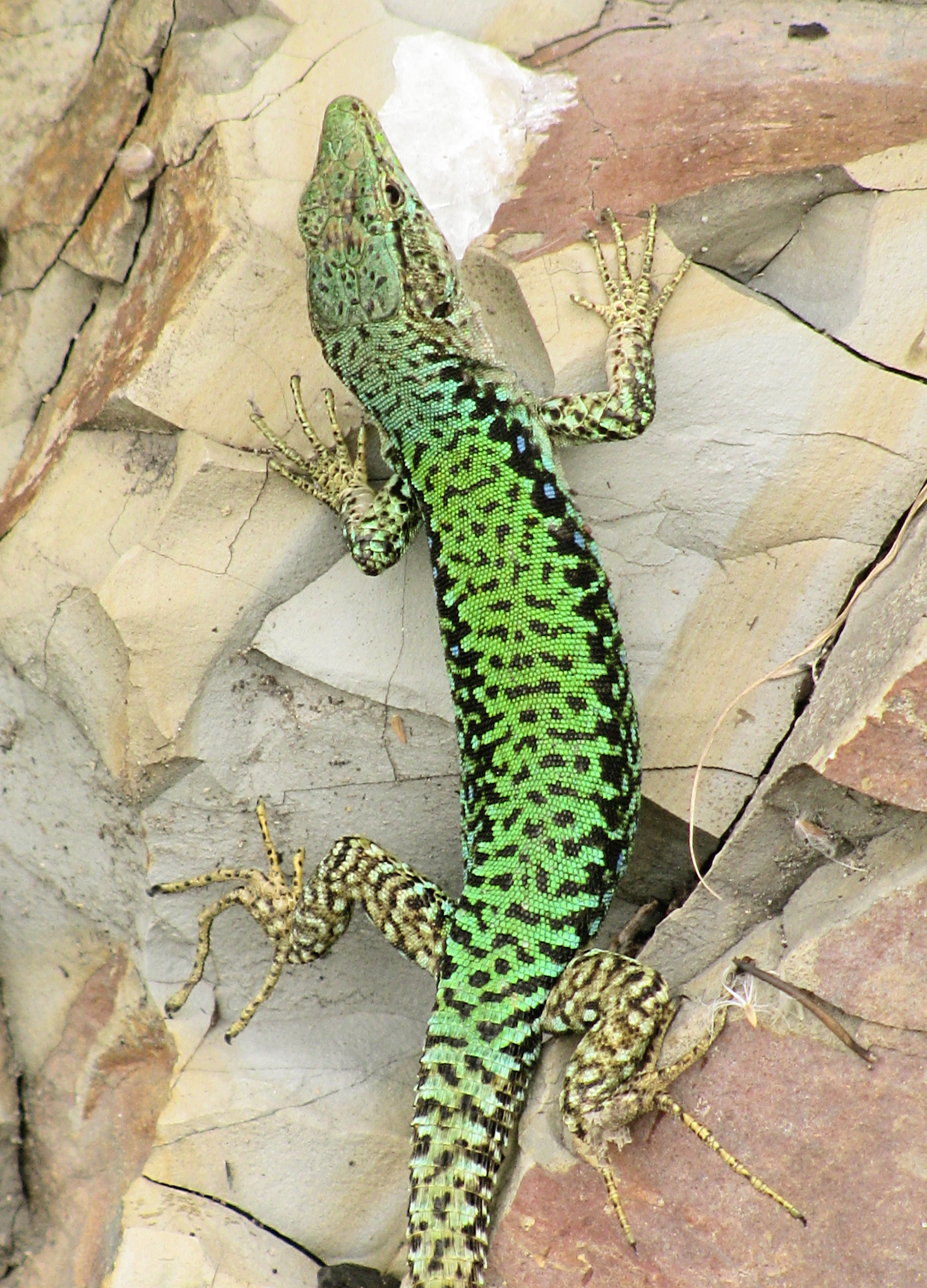

Conservation status
- Least Concern (IUCN 3.1)

Scientific classification
- Kingdom: Animalia
- Phylum: Chordata
- Class: Reptilia
- Order: Squamata
- Suborder: Lacertoidea
- Family: Lacertidae
- Genus: Darevskia
- Species: D. rudis

Binomial name
- Darevskia rudis (Bedriaga, 1886)

= Darevskia rudis =

Species of lizard

Darevskia rudis is a lizard species in the family Lacertidae. It is found in the Caucasus (Georgia, Russia, Azerbaijan) and northern coastal Turkey.

Darevskia rudis is a common species occurring in rocky areas in temperate forests and sometimes in montane steppe at elevations up to 2,400 m (7,900 ft) above sea level.
