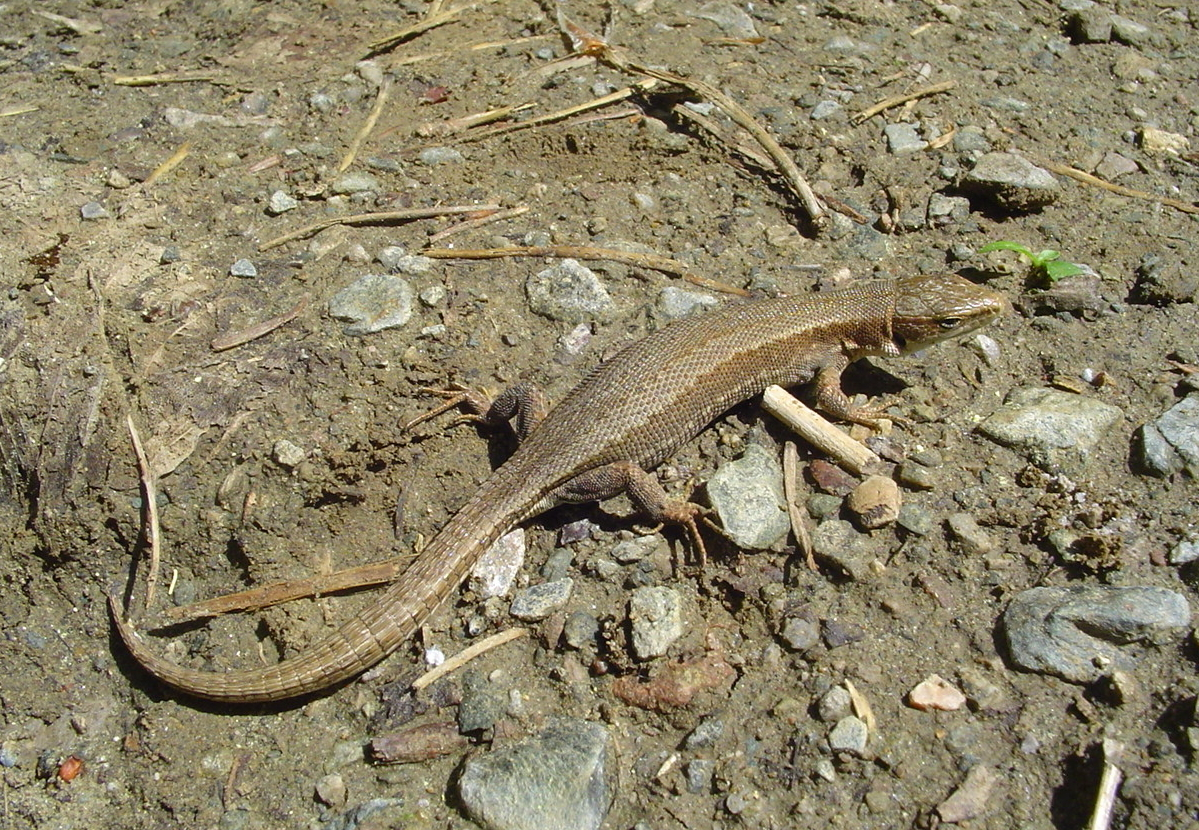

Conservation status
- Near Threatened (IUCN 3.1)

Scientific classification
- Kingdom: Animalia
- Phylum: Chordata
- Order: Squamata
- Family: Lacertidae
- Genus: Darevskia
- Species: D. praticola

Binomial name
- Darevskia praticola (Eversmann, 1834)

= Darevskia praticola =

Species of lizard

Darevskia praticola, the meadow lizard, is a lizard species in the genus Darevskia. It is found in Georgia, Russia, Iran, Serbia, Bulgaria, Romania, Greece, Azerbaijan, Armenia, and Turkey.
