= Ertso Lake =

Lake in South Ossetia

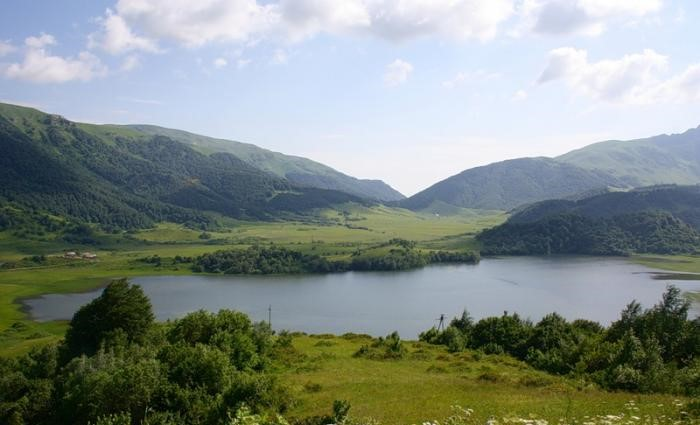
- Ertso Lake

- Location within South Ossetia
- Coordinates: 42°28′13″N 43°45′08″E
- Catchment area: 5.85 km^{2} (2.26 sq mi)
- Basin countries: South Ossetia (de facto) Georgia (de jure)
- Surface area: 0.31 km^{2} (0.12 sq mi)
- Average depth: 2.1 m (6 ft 11 in)
- Max. depth: 19 m (62 ft)
- Water volume: 0.65 million cubic metres (23×10^{6} cu ft)
- Surface elevation: 1,710 m (5,610 ft)

Ertso Lake (Iron Ossetic: Эрцъо), (Georgian: ერწოს ტბა) is a karst lake in the Java Municipality, Shida Kartli region of Georgia. Located in Qvirila river basin, north-west side of the Ertso-Tsona depression, at 1710 m above sea level. Lake Ertso is the biggest known karst lake in Georgia. The area of surface is 0.31 km^{2}, while the catchment area is 5.85 km^{2}. Average depth is 2,1 m, maximal depth is 19 m. The shape of the shore line is complicated. Three permanent rivers inflows of the lake. Lake Ertso extends in a roughly longitudinal direction. Four sinkholes are filled with water. Gets its feed from snow, rainfall and underground waters. The lake surface water temperature is 23–25 °C. The water level is high during May and June and is low during August and September. The lake freezes for almost 5 months in winter. Lake Ertso is included in the "Red List of Georgia". The village of Ertso is located eastern side.

== See also ==
- List of lakes of Georgia
