= Darevskia saxicola =

Conservation status
- Least Concern (IUCN 3.1)

Scientific classification
- Kingdom: Animalia
- Phylum: Chordata
- Class: Reptilia
- Order: Squamata
- Family: Lacertidae
- Genus: Darevskia
- Species: D. saxicola

Binomial name
- Darevskia saxicola (Eversmann, 1834)

Species of lizard

Rock Lizard (Darevskia saxicola)

Darevskia saxicola is a lizard species in the genus Darevskia. It is found in Georgia, Russia, and Turkey.
