= Darevskia bendimahiensis =

Conservation status
- Endangered (IUCN 3.1)

Scientific classification
- Kingdom: Animalia
- Phylum: Chordata
- Class: Reptilia
- Order: Squamata
- Suborder: Lacertoidea
- Family: Lacertidae
- Genus: Darevskia
- Species: D. bendimahiensis

Binomial name
- Darevskia bendimahiensis (Schmidtler, Eiselt, & Darevsky, 1994)

Species of lizard

Darevskia bendimahiensis is a lizard species in the genus Darevskia. It is endemic to Turkey.
