= Josef Eiselt =

Austrian zoologist

- Born: 3 May 1912; Vienna, Austria
- Died: 25 July 2001 (aged 89); Vienna, Austria
- Education: University of Vienna
- Known for: Research on amphibians and reptiles of Southwest Asia; descriptions of new species including Vipera anatolica
- Awards: First president of the Societas Europaea Herpetologica (1979–1985)
- Scientific career
- Fields: Zoology, Herpetology, Carcinology
- Workplaces: University of Vienna; Natural History Museum, Vienna

Josef Eiselt (3 May 1912 – 25 July 2001) was an Austrian zoologist. He specialized in systematic zoology, herpetology, and carcinology.

== Biography ==
After finishing school, Eiselt initially considered becoming an innkeeper, but chose an academic career instead. Beginning in 1933, he studied natural sciences and physics at the University of Vienna. He then worked at the university’s zoological institute. In 1939, under the supervision of Jan Versluys, he earned his doctorate in philosophy with a dissertation on the comparative anatomy of the middle ear in frogs and toads. During his studies he volunteered under Otto Wettstein-Westersheimb in the herpetological department of the Natural History Museum, Vienna, where he later worked as an assistant until he was drafted into the Wehrmacht. At the end of World War II, Eiselt was held as a British prisoner of war until autumn 1945. From 1949 to 1951 he worked as a schoolteacher while also assisting in the reconstruction of the zoological institute. In September 1952, Eiselt became curator of the herpetological department of the Natural History Museum in Vienna. Under his supervision, the collection of over 100,000 preserved specimens—including alcohol preparations and some 3,000 skeletons—was relocated to new facilities. In 1972, he became head of the vertebrate department and retired in 1977.

In 1979, the Societas Europaea Herpetologica was founded, and Eiselt was elected its first president, serving until 1985. Early in his career, Eiselt focused on museum material, especially salamanders, lizards, and Austrian herpetofauna. After the Nubian expedition (1962), he concentrated on the systematics and distribution of amphibians and reptiles of Southwest Asia, especially in Turkey and Transcaucasia. He conducted numerous field expeditions, including to Nubia, Iraq, Iran, Afghanistan, and repeatedly to Turkey (15 times in total). His last expedition, at age 81, was to Yemen. Between 1940 and 1996, Eiselt published 45 herpetological papers. He described numerous new species, including Bufotes oblongus, Bufotes zugmayeri, Anatololacerta budaki, Darevskia bendimahiensis, Darevskia steineri, Eirenis hakkariensis, and Eirenis rechingeri. Among his most significant discoveries were the endangered Anatolian meadow viper (Vipera anatolica) and Iranodon persicus, the first salamandrid discovered in Iran. In addition to his herpetological work, Eiselt also studied copepods. He collaborated closely with German herpetologist Josef Friedrich Schmidtler and was often accompanied on expeditions by Viennese photographer Inge Adametz. In 1979, Eiselt named the subspecies Apathya cappadocica schmidtlerorum in honor of Schmidtler and his father Josef Johann Schmidtler.

== Eponyms ==
Species and subspecies named after Josef Eiselt include:

- Atretochoana eiselti
- Gephyromantis eiselti
- Podarcis tiliguerta eiselti
- Dolichophis caspius eiselti
- Emys orbicularis eiselti
- Ablepharus chernovi eiselti
- Calamaria eiselti
- Eirenis eiselti
- Pseudorabdion eiselti
