= Lajos Méhelÿ =

Hungarian zoologist

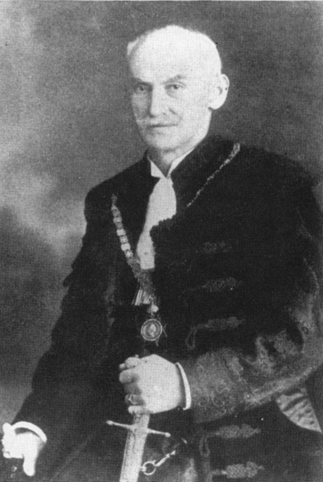
- Born: August 24, 1862; Kisfalud-Szögi, Austrian Empire
- Died: February 4, 1953 (aged 90); Budapest, Hungary
- Education: Budapest University of Technology and Economics
- Occupations: zoologist, racialist, author

Lajos Méhelÿ (August 24, 1862 – February 4, 1953) was a Hungarian zoologist, herpetologist, professor, and author. He remains controversial due to his Social Darwinist and racialist publications. He was a member of the Hungarian Academy of Sciences, but renounced his membership.

Besides his zoological work, he increasingly dedicated his life to Hungarian racial theory and Turanism. As a result, he was imprisoned after the Second World War until his death in old age.

== Early life ==
Méhelÿ was born in Kisfalud-Szögi (today: Bodrogkisfalud). His father served as a bailiff on the Dessewffy estates in Zemplén then Sáros County. He started elementary school in his birthplace and finished fourth grade in Kassa (today: Kosice, Slovakia). He began the first class of grammar school in Eperjes (today: Prešov, Slovakia) but graduated from Lőcse (today: Levoča, Slovakia).

He studied chemistry, zoology, and botany at the Budapest University of Technology and Economics (BME).

== Career ==
He worked as an assistant professor beside János Kriesch, one of his former teachers. After that he taught in Brassó (today: Brașov, Romania) between 1885 and 1896. His first great works emerged there.

From 1896 to 1915 he worked for the Department of Zoology in the Hungarian National Museum, where he was the director of the collection of mounted specimens for three years.

This position was exchanged for a teacher's desk until his retirement in 1932. He taught general zoology and comparative anatomy at the Department of Zoology of the Pázmány Péter Catholic University.

He was a member of the Hungarian Academy of Sciences (MTA) between 1899 and 1931. After the First World War he expanded his Darwinist approach to the human sciences and started dealing with racialist biology. He had devoted his life to this idea, increasingly overtaking his zoological activity. After the Second World War, he was sentenced to life imprisonment by a People's Tribunal in 1945. He died in prison in 1953.

== Herpetology ==
While at the Hungarian National Museum, Méhelÿ studied amphibians and reptiles. He described several new species of frogs, and seven new species of lizards. The snake genus Mehelya was named in his honor.
