= Ilya Darevsky =

Ilya Sergeyevich Darevsky
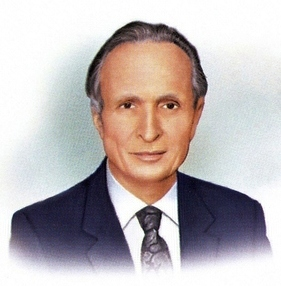
- Born: 18 December 1924; Kiev, Ukrainian SSR, USSR
- Died: 8 August 2009 (aged 84); St. Petersburg, Russia
- Citizenship: Russian
- Education: Moscow State University (1953)
- Scientific career
- Fields: Zoology, herpetology
- Workplaces: Russian Academy of Sciences; Leningrad State University
- Doctoral advisor: Chernov|Sergey A. Chernov

Ilya Sergeyevich Darevsky (Russian: Илья Сергеевич Даревский, 18 December 1924 – 8 August 2009) was a Soviet Russian zoologist-herpetologist and a corresponding member of the Russian Academy of Sciences. During his career he described 34 species of amphibians and reptiles. Darevskia, a genus of Caucasian rock lizards, is named after him.

== Early life and military career ==
Darevsky was born on 18 December 1924 in Kiev. He was interested in amphibians and reptiles since his childhood, when he met Sergey A. Chernov, a herpetologist from Leningrad. During World War II, he was wounded twice and was decorated with the Order of the Red Star and Order of the Great Patriotic War of the 1st degree.

== Scientific career ==
After the war, Darevsky was recruited to join the Biology Faculty of the Moscow State University, from which he graduated in 1953. From 1954 to 1962, he worked in Armenia, first as a Ph. D. student, then as a Junior Researcher, Scientific Secretary and Head of the Department of Zoological Institute, Armenian SSR Academy of Sciences. In 1958, he defended his Kandidat thesis on reptiles of Armenia and their zoogeography (under the supervision of Dr. Sergey A. Chernov). Later on, studies of the Caucasian herpetofauna, and the rock lizards in particular, made him a recognized scientist. In 1962, Darevsky became Junior Researcher at the Zoological Institute of the USSR Academy of Sciences; in 1967, he defended his Doktor of sciences thesis "The Rock Lizards of the Caucasus"; and in 1976, he became the Head of Laboratory of Ornithology and Herpetology, which he led for the next twenty years.

Darevsky made many discoveries in evolutionary biology. He was the first to discover parthenogenesis and polyploidy in higher vertebrates and showed their importance for speciation. These discoveries inspired an explosion of similar investigations across many taxa and made Darevsky a world authority on the evolutionary importance of parthenogenesis and polyploidy in vertebrates.

Darevsky authored more than three hundred scientific papers and several monographs about the systematics, ecology, paleontology, morphology, and conservation of amphibians and reptiles. He has also been part of many zoological expeditions to the Caucasus, Central Asia, Indonesia (Komodo), and Vietnam. He trained many scientists from the Commonwealth of Independent States, Mongolia, and Vietnam, and for many years he lectured on herpetology at Leningrad State University. For the training of next generation foreign scientists, he was awarded the Order of Friendship of Peoples (1982) by the government of the Soviet Union and "Friendship" medal (2000) by the government of Vietnam. In 1985, he was given the honorary title of Honored Scientist of the RSFSR, and in 1987 he became a laureate of Mechnikov Prize. Darevsky was President of the Russian Herpetological Society (1989–2006), honorary member of the Societas Europaea Herpetologica (since 1996) and American Society of Ichthyologists and Herpetologists (since 1973), and a member of many Russian and foreign scientific societies.

Many species of amphibians and reptiles were named in honor of Darevsky. The Caucasian rock lizards, that Darevsky studied for his entire life, were named in his honor as a genus Darevskia, as well as the viper Vipera darevskii, and the lizard Eutropis darevskii. As head of the Laboratory of Ornithology and Herpetology, he introduced a collaborative style of administration that encouraged independent research. Colleagues noted his willingness to support junior researchers and his openness to professional consultation.

During his last ten years, Darevsky was a leader of the St. Petersburg herpetological school. He became seriously ill over the last few years and was unable to visit the Zoological Institute. Nonetheless, he was continuously interested in the life of his colleagues and was upset that he could not work anymore. But as he said before his death: "I did a lot, and now I should have some rest". He died on 8 August 2009 aged 84.

== Selected publications ==
- Orlov, Nikolai; Darevsky, Ilya S. (1999) "Description of a new species of mainland Goniurosaurus genus, from the north-eastern Vietnam". Russian Journal of Herpetology 6 (1): 72–78.
- Darevsky IS, Kupriyanova LA, Roshchin VV (1984). "A new all-female triploid species of gecko and karyological data on the bisexual Hemidactylus frenatus from Vietnam". Journal of Herpetology 18 (3): 277–284.
- Ananjeva NB, Borkin LJ, Darevsky IS, Orlov NL (1998). "[Amphibians and Reptiles]". In: [Encyclopedia of Nature of Russia]. Moscow: ABF. 574 pp. (in Russian).
