= List of screw corvettes of Italy =

Amerigo Vespucci in 1898

The Italian Regia Marina (Royal Navy) built and operated ten steam corvettes in the 19th century. The first four vessels, San Giovanni, Magenta, Etna, and Principessa Clotilde, had been built by the Sardinian, Tuscan, and Neapolitan navies before Italy unified in 1861. The remainder were all built following the unification of Italy.

Key
Armament	The number and type of the primary armament
Displacement	Ship displacement at full combat load
Propulsion	Number of shafts, type of propulsion system, and top speed generated
Service	The dates work began and finished on the ship and its ultimate fate
Laid down	The date the keel assembly commenced
Commissioned	The date the ship was commissioned

== San Giovanni ==
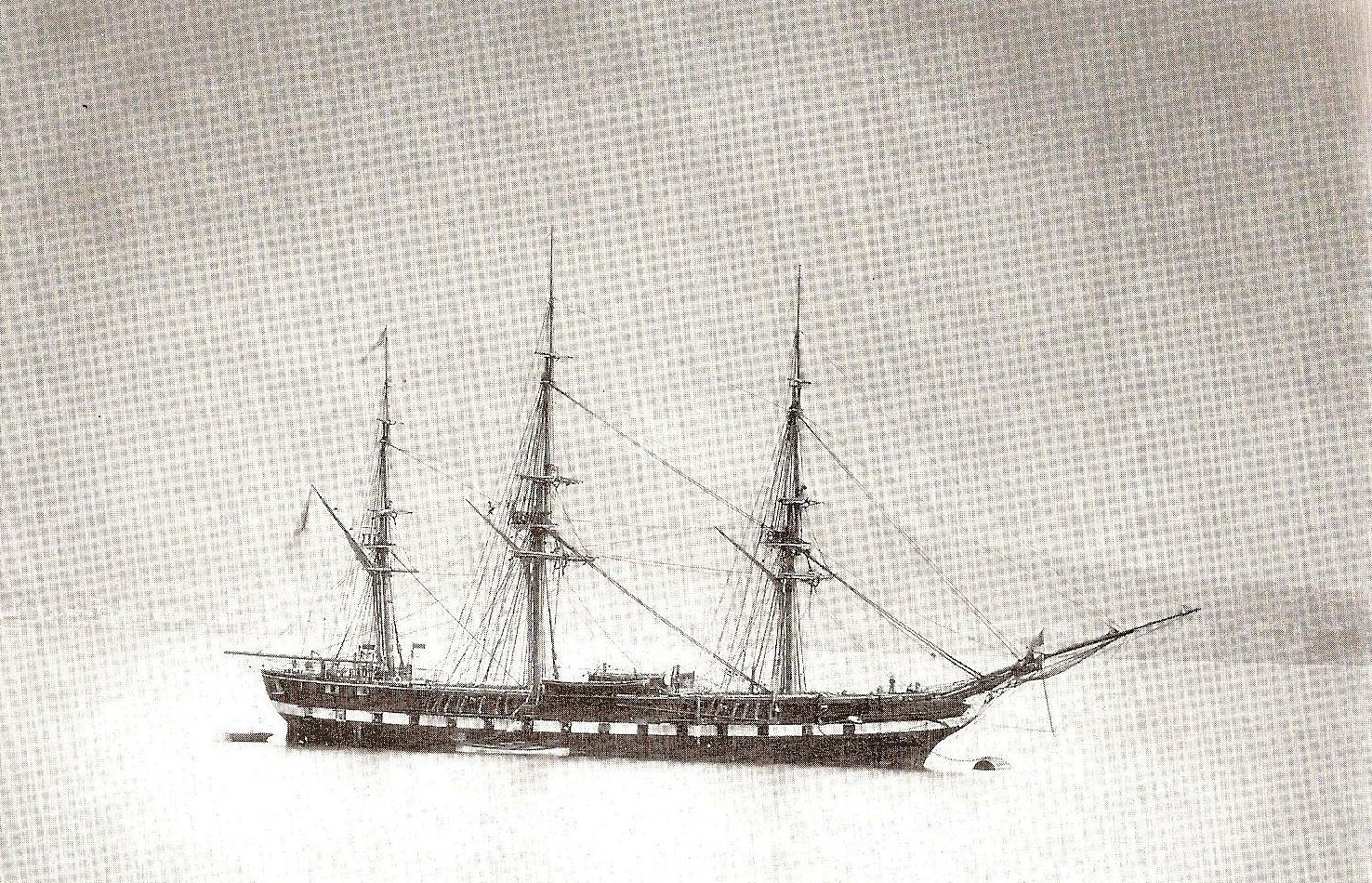
San Giovanni

San Giovanni was originally built for the Royal Sardinian Navy in the late 1840s. Following the Second Italian War of Independence and the unification of most of Italy, the Sardinian fleet formed the nucleus of the new Regia Marina (Royal Navy) and San Giovanni passed into its service.

San Giovanni took part in the Lissa campaign in July 1866 during the Third Italian War of Independence. There, she served in the Second Squadron under Admiral Giovan Battista Albini. Albini was responsible for transporting and landing the Italian army forces that were to seize the island of Lissa, though he failed to follow his orders. In the Battle of Lissa that followed the abortive landing operation, Albini failed to support the ironclad fleet under Admiral Carlo Pellion di Persano, and as a result, San Giovanni saw no action during the battle. Albini was sacked after the battle for his timidity and failure to follow orders.

San Giovanni was laid up in 1875, and by 1878, the Regia Marina had broken her up for scrap.

Ship	Armament	Displacement	Propulsion	Service		
Ship	Armament	Displacement	Propulsion	Laid down	Commissioned	Fate
San Giovanni	32 guns	1,752 long tons (1,780 t)	1848	1849	Unknown	Laid up, 1875

== Magenta ==
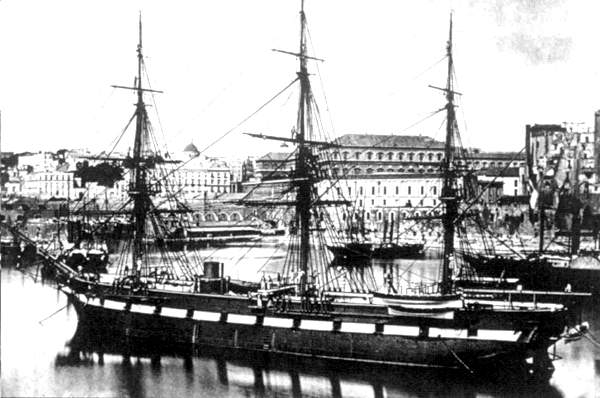
Magenta in 1870

Starting in June 1865, Magenta went on a major cruise around the world, with the anthropologist and zoologist Enrico Hillyer Giglioli aboard. While on the cruise in 1867, Magenta visited Australia and New Zealand. In 1873, the ship visited Tenedos in the Ottoman Empire.

Ship	Armament	Displacement	Propulsion	Service		
Ship	Armament	Displacement	Propulsion	Laid down	Commissioned	Fate
Magenta	20 guns	2,669 long tons (2,712 t)	Unknown	Unknown	Unknown	Laid up, 1875

== Etna ==
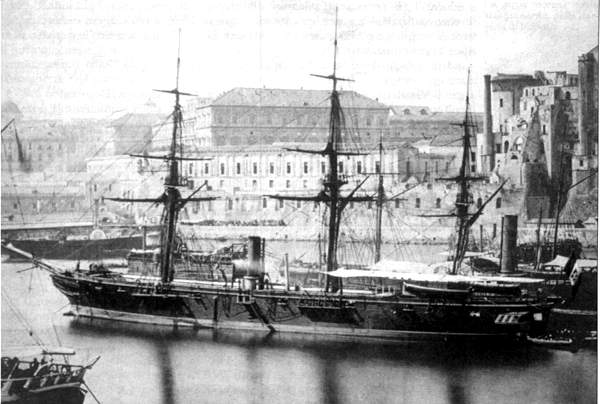
Etna c. 1875

Ship	Armament	Displacement	Propulsion	Service		
Ship	Armament	Displacement	Propulsion	Laid down	Commissioned	Fate
Etna	12 guns	1,538 long tons (1,563 t)	Unknown	Unknown	Unknown	Laid up, 1875

== Principessa Clotilde ==
In 1870, Principessa Clotilde was sent to the western Pacific Ocean on a mission to obtain land in Borneo, which was to be used as a penal colony. Opposition from Britain, the Netherlands, and the United States forced Italy to abandon any claims in the area.

Ship	Armament	Displacement	Propulsion	Service		
Ship	Armament	Displacement	Propulsion	Laid down	Commissioned	Fate
Principessa Clotilde	24 guns	2,184 long tons (2,219 t)	Unknown	Unknown	Unknown	Laid up, 1875

== Caracciolo ==
Caracciolo under sail

The first new cruising ship built for the Italian navy, Caracciolo was laid down originally under the name Brilliante, being renamed at her launching in January 1869. The ship was designed by the Italian naval architect Giuseppe Micheli. Between 1875 and 1880, Caracciolo was used as a training ship. She thereafter went on a major cruise around the world; in 1884, she stopped in Sydney and Melbourne in Australia. She had her engine removed in 1893–1894, and she relied solely on her sailing rig thereafter. As of 1904, Caracciolo was assigned to the training division as a boy's training ship, along with Miseno and Palinuro. They were kept in service for seven months a year. The ship was ultimately sold to ship breakers in March 1907 and subsequently scrapped.

Ship	Armament	Displacement	Propulsion	Service		
Ship	Armament	Displacement	Propulsion	Laid down	Commissioned	Fate
Caracciolo	6 × 160 mm (6.3 in) muzzle-loading (ML) guns	1,553 long tons (1,578 t)	1 shaft, 1 single-expansion steam engine, 9.2 kn (17.0 km/h; 10.6 mph)	October 1865	20 July 1870	Sold for scrap, 10 March 1907

== Vettor Pisani ==
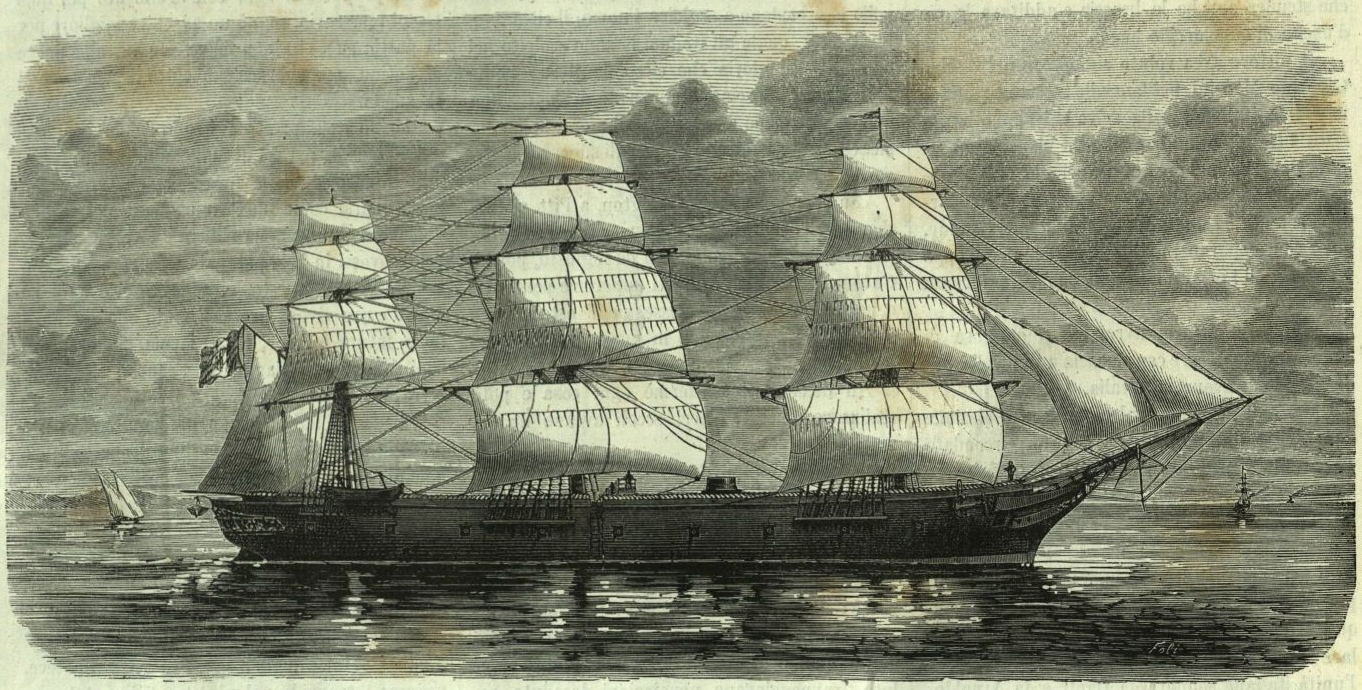
Engraving of Vettor Pisani, c. 1873

Micheli also designed the next Italian corvette, Vettor Pisani. Like her immediate predecessor, she too was laid down under a different name; the ship was originally named Briosa before being renamed in 1868 while still under construction. The ship went on a cruise in the Pacific Ocean in the early 1870s, and in 1872 patrolled off the coast of New Guinea. Vettor Pisani was rebuilt in 1879, and went on another major exploratory cruise in 1883–1885. Upon her return to Italy, she was used as a training ship for the Italian Naval Academy. She served in this capacity until early 1893, when she was sold for scrap.

Ship	Armament	Displacement	Propulsion	Service		
Ship	Armament	Displacement	Propulsion	Laid down	Commissioned	Fate
Vettor Pisani	6 × 120 mm (4.7 in) guns	1,676 long tons (1,703 t)	1 shaft, 1 single-expansion steam engine, 9.76 kn (18.08 km/h; 11.23 mph)	11 May 1867	10 April 1871	Sold for scrap, 12 February 1893

== Cristoforo Colombo ==
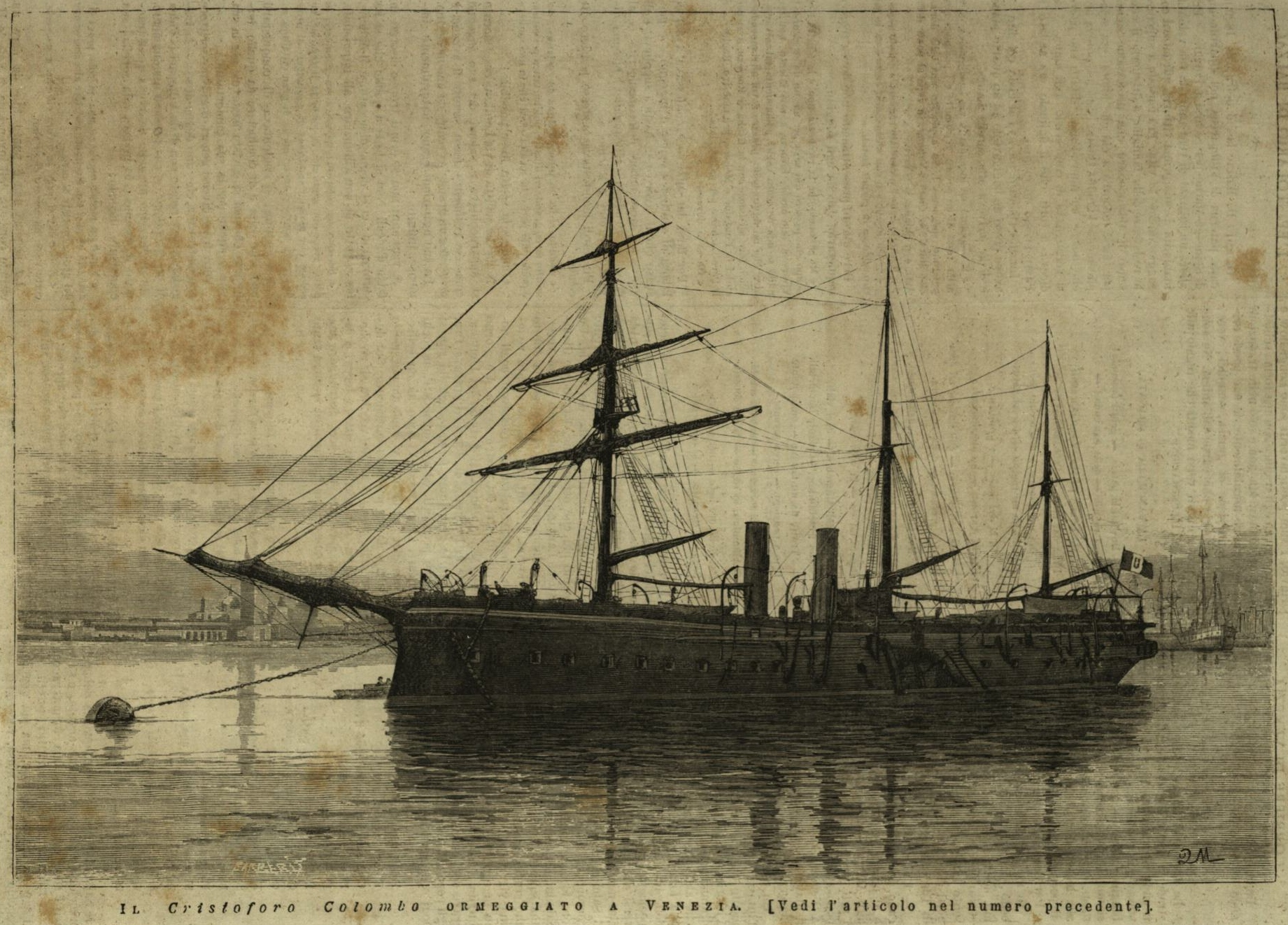
Cristoforo Colombo, c. 1877

The next Italian corvette, Cristoforo Colombo, was designed by the naval architect Benedetto Brin. Brin intended to build a cruising warship with a speed of about 13 knots (24 km/h; 15 mph), but the British engine supplier, J Penn & Sons, provided an engine with more than twice the horsepower that Brin had specified, resulting in a significantly faster ship. Cristoforo Colombo went on a trip to the Pacific in the late 1870s and visited Australia in 1878. She was ultimately sold for scrap in 1891.

Ship	Armament	Displacement	Propulsion	Service		
Ship	Armament	Displacement	Propulsion	Laid down	Commissioned	Fate
Cristoforo Colombo	8 × 120 mm guns	2,325 long tons (2,362 t)	1 shaft, 1 single-expansion steam engine, 16 kn (30 km/h; 18 mph)	1 February 1873	16 November 1876	Sold for scrap, 1891

== Flavio Gioia ==
Flavio Gioia in port

Carlo Vigna designed the first steel-hulled corvette of the Italian fleet, Flavio Gioia. She was converted into a training ship in 1892, a role she filled for the remainder of her career. In 1902, Flavio Gioia was assigned to the training division, along with Amerigo Vespucci. She remained in service as a training ship in 1904, assigned to the Italian Naval Academy, where she was kept in commission for ten months per year. After she was discarded from the navy's inventory in 1920, she was used as a boys' training ship under the designation CM181 until 1923, when she was sold for scrap.

Ship	Armament	Displacement	Propulsion	Service		
Ship	Armament	Displacement	Propulsion	Laid down	Commissioned	Fate
Flavio Gioia	8 × 149 mm (5.9 in) guns	2,493 long tons (2,533 t)	1 shaft, 1 single-expansion steam engine, 14 kn (26 km/h; 16 mph)	26 June 1879	26 January 1883	Sold for scrap, 4 March 1923

== Amerigo Vespucci ==
Also designed by Vigna, Amerigo Vespucci was very similar to Flavio Gioia, though she was slightly heavier and slower. She had her armament reduced in 1892, and she was used thereafter as a training ship, a role she would fill for more than thirty-five years. Amerigo Vespucci joined Flavio Gioia in the training squadron in 1902. She remained in service until January 1928, when she was sold to ship breakers.

Ship	Armament	Displacement	Propulsion	Service		
Ship	Armament	Displacement	Propulsion	Laid down	Commissioned	Fate
Amerigo Vespucci	8 × 149 mm guns	2,751 long tons (2,795 t)	1 shaft, 1 single-expansion steam engine, 13.66 kn (25.30 km/h; 15.72 mph)	9 December 1879	1 September 1884	Sold for scrap, 22 January 1928

== Cristoforo Colombo ==
Cristoforo Colombo in 1896

Ship	Armament	Displacement	Propulsion	Service		
Ship	Armament	Displacement	Propulsion	Laid down	Commissioned	Fate
Cristoforo Colombo	8 × 120 mm guns	2,713 long tons (2,757 t)	1 shaft, 1 single-expansion steam engine, 13 kn (24 km/h; 15 mph)	1 September 1890	16 October 1894	Sold for scrap, 10 March 1907
