= Italian ship Cristoforo Colombo =

Four ships of the Italian Regia Marina (Royal Navy) have been named Cristoforo Colombo, after the Genoese explorer Christopher Columbus:

- Italian corvette Cristoforo Colombo (1875), a wooden-hulled ship built in the 1870s
- Italian corvette Cristoforo Colombo (1892), a steel-hulled ship built to replace the original vessel
- Italian battleship Cristoforo Colombo, a Francesco Caracciolo-class battleship cancelled in 1916
- Italian training ship Cristoforo Colombo, a sail training ship launched in 1928, she was ceded to the Soviet Union in 1949 and given the name Dunay
