= Iranolacerta zagrosica =

Conservation status
- Least Concern (IUCN 3.1)

Scientific classification
- Kingdom: Animalia
- Phylum: Chordata
- Class: Reptilia
- Order: Squamata
- Family: Lacertidae
- Genus: Iranolacerta
- Species: I. zagrosica

Binomial name
- Iranolacerta zagrosica (N. Rastegar-Pouyani & Nilson, 1998)

Synonyms
- Lacerta zagrosica N. Rastegar-Pouyani & Nilson, 1998; Iranolacerta zagrosica — Arnold, Arribas & Carranza, 2007

Species of lizard

Iranolacerta zagrosica, also known commonly as the Zagros Mountains lacerta, is a species of lizard in the family Lacertidae. The species is endemic to Iran.

== Geographic range ==
I. zagrosica occurs in the central Zagros Mountains in Esfahan and Lorestan Provinces, Iran.

== Habitat ==
The Zagros Mountains lacerta's habitat includes rocky outcrops and vertical walls in alpine meadows, at altitudes of 2,450–3,200 m (8,040–10,500 ft).

== Sympatric species ==
I. zagrosica co-occurs with I. brandtii, which prefers horizontal gravel substrates as opposed to rocky slopes.

== Description ==
I. zagrosica has a single postnasal plate, and ten ventral plate rows.

== Reproduction ==
I. zagrosica is oviparous.
