= Italian ship Etna =

Several ships of the Italian Navy have been named Etna, after Mount Etna in Sicily:

- Italian corvette Etna, a screw corvette built in the 1860s
- Italian cruiser Etna, the lead ship of a class of 1880s protected cruisers
- Italian cruiser Etna, an Etna-class cruiser originally ordered for the Thai Navy and subsequently requisitioned for service by the Italian Navy on the outbreak of World War II
- Italian ship Etna (A 5328), originally cargo ship USS Whitley (AKA-91), transferred to Italy in 1962
- Italian ship Etna (A 5326), a replenishment ship that entered service in 1998

== See also ==
- HMS Aetna, British ships
- Etna-class corvette, Napoleonic corvettes of France
