= Iranolacerta =

Scientific classification
- Kingdom: Animalia
- Phylum: Chordata
- Class: Reptilia
- Order: Squamata
- Family: Lacertidae
- Genus: Iranolacerta; Arnold, Arribas & Carranza, 2007

Species
- Two, see text.

Genus of lizards

Iranolacerta is a genus of wall lizards of the family Lacertidae.

== Species ==
- Iranolacerta brandtii (De Filippi, 1863) – Brandt's Persian lizard
- Iranolacerta zagrosica (N. Rastegar-Pouyani & Nilson, 1998) – Zagros Mountains lacerta

Nota bene: A binomial authority in parentheses indicates that the species was originally described in a genus other than Iranolacerta.
