= List of shipwrecks in May 1866 =

The list of shipwrecks in May 1866 includes ships sunk, foundered, grounded, or otherwise lost during May 1866.

== 1 May ==
List of shipwrecks: 1 May 1866
Ship	State	Description
Apolo	Spain	The brig was wrecked on Mindoro, Spanish East Indies with the loss of eight or nine lives. She was on a voyage from Albay to Manila.
Generese	France	The ship foundered. She was on a voyage from Maracaibo, Venezuela to Marseille, Bouches-du-Rhône.
Maharaj	(United Kingdom) British Raj	The steamship was wrecked off Jeetapore with the loss of twelve lives.
"Mary"	United States	The boat sank while coming from Boston to Gloucester, Massachusetts. Crew saved.
Mary Ann	United Kingdom	The ship was driven ashore near Den Helder, North Holland, Netherlands. She was on a voyage from Newcastle upon Tyne, Northumberland to Den Helder. She was refloated and towed into the Nieuwe Diep in a leaky condition.
Mary Jane	United Kingdom	The ship was wrecked. A message in a bottle washed up a Great Yarmouth, Norfolk on May 7, 1867 giving the news.
Mercutio	Austrian Empire	The barque sank in Manila Bay. She was on a voyage from Hong Kong to Manila.
Ortelius	Netherlands	The ship ran aground on the Brouwers Sands, in the Strait of Sunda. She was on a voyage from Amsterdam, North Holland to Batavia, Netherlands East Indies. She was refloated with assistance and resumed her voyage.
Progress	United Kingdom	The barque foundered in the English Channel 20 nautical miles (37 km) south west of Portland, Dorset. Her crew were rescued.
Sir Robert Preston	United Kingdom	The ship ran aground on the Andrews Sand, in the North Sea off the coast of Essex. She was on a voyage from Saint-Valery-sur-Somme, Somme, France to Leith, Lothian. She was refloated and towed in to Harwich, Essex in a leaky condition.
St. Julian	United Kingdom	The ship foundered in the Atlantic Ocean. Her twelve crew were rescued by J. A. Bishop (United States). St. Julian was on a voyage from Havana, Cuba to the Strait of Belle Isle.
Tiempo	Spain	The brig was driven ashore in Manila Bay. She was on a voyage from Shanghai, China to Manila.

== 2 May ==
List of shipwrecks: 2 May 1866
Ship	State	Description
Dauntless	United Kingdom	The ship ran aground at Sunderland, County Durham. She was on a voyage from Leith, Lothian to Sunderland, County Durham. She was refloated with the assistance of two steamships.
Dispatch	United Kingdom	The schooner was driven ashore at Tetney Haven, Lincolnshire. She was on a voyage from Great Yarmouth, Norfolk to Sunderland. She was refloated on 15 May and taken in to Grimsby, Lincolnshire.
Friend	United States	The schooner was scuttled off Eastport, Maine by Fenians, who had seizeed the schooner Wentworth (United Kingdom).
Sterling	United States	The ship was abandoned in the Atlantic Ocean. Her crew were rescued by Anne Mary Dixon (United Kingdom). Sterling was on a voyage from Liverpool, Lancashire, United Kingdom to Boston, Massachusetts.
Washington	United Kingdom	The ship was driven ashore at Ingonish, Nova Scotia, British North America. Her crew were rescued.
Wonga Wonga	(United Kingdom) New Zealand	The 40-ton steamer was lost while attempting to enter the Grey River at Greymouth. A strong current caught her and slewed her, causing her to run aground. The heavy surf knocked her about to the extent that her back was broken. There were no deaths.

== 3 May ==
List of shipwrecks: 3 May 1866
Ship	State	Description
Arcturus	United States	The fishing schooner struck on L'Hommadieu Shoal and sank. Crew saved. She was abandoned to the underwriters, and subsequently raised and sold.
Elsina	Netherlands	The galiot sprang a leak and was beached at Matosinhos, Portugal. Her crew were rescued. She was on a voyage from Newcastle upon Tyne, Northumberland, United Kingdom to Porto, Portugal. She was refloated on 10 May and taken in to Leixões, Portugal.
Flach	Chilean Navy	The submarine sank with the loss of her entire 11-man crew during a test run in the bay off Valparaíso.
Frindsbury	United Kingdom	The barque foundered after striking ice off the Magdalen Islands, Quebec, British North America with the loss of her captain. She was on a voyage from Aberdovey, Cardiganshire to Miramichi, New Brunswick, British North America.
Hornet	United States	The clipper ship burned at sea and sank in the Pacific Ocean during a voyage from New York City to San Francisco, California. The crew abandoned ship in three open lifeboats, two of which disappeared. Fourteen men survived for 43 days aboard the third boat before reaching Hawaii on 15 June.
Leipzic	United Kingdom	The steamship suffered an onboard explosion and caught fire, severely injuring three of her crew. She put back to Hartlepool, County Durham.

== 4 May ==
List of shipwrecks: 4 May 1866
Ship	State	Description
Belle	United Kingdom	The smack struck the wreck of the steamship Barbadian (United Kingdom) during salvage operations and was damaged. She was consequently beached at Wexford. Her crew were rescued.
Clara	United Kingdom	The ship foundered off Scarborough, Yorkshire.
Murray	United Kingdom	The schooner struck rocks at Newton, Northumberland and sank. She was on a voyage from Sunderland, County Durham to Port Gordon, Moray.

== 5 May ==
List of shipwrecks: 5 May 1866
Ship	State	Description
Flora	United Kingdom	The brig ran aground. She was refloated and taken in to Swinemünde, Prussia.
Margaretta	Italy	The brig ran aground at Cardiff, Glamorgan, United Kingdom.

== 6 May ==
List of shipwrecks: 6 May 1866
Ship	State	Description
Indian Empire	United Kingdom	The steamship sank in the Victoria Dock, London.
Royalist	United Kingdom	The ship sank off "Lavenskar". Her crew were rescued.
Undaunted	United Kingdom	The ship was wrecked on Naissaar, Russia. Her crew were rescued. She was on a voyage from Kronstadt, Russia to Sunderland, County Durham.

== 7 May ==
List of shipwrecks: 7 May 1866
Ship	State	Description
Andrew	United Kingdom	The schooner was driven ashore at North Sunderland, Northumberland. She was on a voyage from Sunderland, County Durham to Kirkcaldy, Fife.
Earl Bathurst	United Kingdom	The ship ran aground at Hartlepool, County Durham.
Hutton	United Kingdom	The brig was driven ashore at Lowestoft, Suffolk. She was refloated the next day and resumed her voyage.
Joan Taylor	United Kingdom	The ship foundered 90 nautical miles (170 km) south west of Queenstown, County Cork. Her crew were rescued. She was on a voyage from Liverpool, Lancashire to Barbados.
Success	United Kingdom	The ship ran aground at Great Yarmouth, Norfolk. She was on a voyage from Seaham, County Durham to Great Yarmouth. She was refloated on 10 May.

== 8 May ==
List of shipwrecks: 8 May 1866
Ship	State	Description
Luna	Hamburg	The steamship ran aground at Sunderland, County Durham, United Kingdom. She was on a voyage from Hamburg to Sunderland. She was refloated.
Saucy Lass	United Kingdom	The ship foundered off Marbella, Spain. Her crew survived. She was on a voyage from Cardiff, Glamorgan to Galaţi, Ottoman Empire.

== 9 May ==
List of shipwrecks: 9 May 1866
Ship	State	Description
Benjamin Attwood	Italy	The steamship was driven ashore near Vona, Ottoman Empire. She was on a voyage from Constantinople to Trebizonde, Ottoman Empire.
Centenary	United Kingdom	The schooner was towed in to Porthclais, Pembrokeshire in a derelict condition. She was on a voyage from Barrow in Furness, Lancashire to Briton Ferry, Glamorgan.
Effort	United Kingdom	The brigantine ran aground on the Shipwash Sand, in the North Sea off the coast of Suffolk and was abandoned by her crew. She was on a voyage from Sunderland, County Durham to London. She was refloated and taken in to Harwich, Essex.
Flora	Norway	The brig was driven ashore near Hjørring, Denmark. Her crew were rescued. She was on a voyage from Hartlepool, County Durham to Copenhagen, Denmark.
Young Lochinvar	United Kingdom	The ship was wrecked on Hainan Island, China near with the loss of a crew member. She was on a voyage from Hong Kong to Foo Chow Foo, China.

== 10 May ==
List of shipwrecks: 10 May 1866
Ship	State	Description
Elizabeth Jenkins	(United Kingdom) British North America	The barque ran aground on a reef off the coast of Cuba. She was on a voyage from Havana to Manzanillo.
Euxine	United Kingdom	The barque was driven ashore at Shanghai, China. A crew member was reported missing. She was on a voyage from Woosung to Shanghai. She was refloated and towed in to Shanghai.
Evangelist	United Kingdom	The ship ran aground at the mouth of the River Wear. She was on a voyagte from Sunderland, County Durham to Alexandria, Egypt. She was refloated with the assistance of two tugs and resumed her voyage.
Nubia	United Kingdom	The ship was wrecked on Scatterie Island, Nova Scotia, British North America with the loss of one of her twenty crew. She was on a voyage from Havre de Grâce, Seine-Inférieure, France to Quebec City, Province of Canada, British North America.
Ocean Storm	United Kingdom	The ship was driven ashore in Robin Hoods Bay. She was on a voyage from Sunderland to the Nieuwe Diep. She was refloated and towed back to Sunderland by the tug Robert Burns (United Kingdom).
Paquete de Maule	Spanish Navy	Chincha Islands War: The sidewheel paddle steamer was burned and scuttled near San Lorenzo Island off the coast of Peru.

== 11 May ==
List of shipwrecks: 11 May 1866
Ship	State	Description
Barbadian	United Kingdom	The ship was wrecked on "Roskar", Russia. Her crew were rescued. She was on a voyage from Hartlepool, County Durham to Kronstadt, Russia.
Betsey	United Kingdom	The schooner collided with the steamship Black Diamond (United Kingdom) and sank in the Swin. Her crew were rescued. She was on a voyage from Hartlepool to Gravesend, Kent.
Good Intent	(United Kingdom) British North America	The ship collided with the steamship Africa (United Kingdom) and sank with the loss of all hands. She was on a voyage from Halifax to Mahone Bay, Nova Scotia.
Haabets Anker	Norway	The ship was driven ashore and wrecked near Dunbar, Lothian, United Kingdom. Her crew were rescued. She was on a voyage from Dram to Leith, Lothian.
Hecla	United Kingdom	The paddle tug collided with the paddle steamer Britannia (United Kingdom) and sank at the mouth of the River Tyne. Her three crew were rescued.
Lindisfarne	United Kingdom	The brig ran aground at Guánia, Puerto Rico. She was on a voyage from "Pome", Puerto Rico to Guánia. She was refloated.
Oregon	United Kingdom	The ship was driven ashore by ice near Vyborg, Grand Duchy of Finland.

== 12 May ==
List of shipwrecks: 12 May 1866
Ship	State	Description
Southwick	United Kingdom	The steamship sank at Dunkirk, Nord, France. She was on a voyage from South Shields, County Durham to Dunkirk. She was refloated.

== 13 May ==
List of shipwrecks: 13 May 1866
Ship	State	Description
Annette	(United Kingdom) British North America	The steamship ran aground on St. Roche's Shoal and sank. She was on a voyage from Pictou, Nova Scotia to Montreal, Province of Canada.
Peggy and Elizabeth	United Kingdom	The schooner sprang a leak and foundered east of the Isle of May. Her crew survived. She was on a voyage from Leven, Fife to London.
Pisano	Mexico	The steamship struck a submerged object at the mouth of the Rio Grande and was holed. She was on a voyage from Matamoros to Veracruz. She put back to Matamors, where she was repaired.

== 14 May ==
List of shipwrecks: 14 May 1866
Ship	State	Description
Brisk	(United Kingdom) New Zealand	The cutter was holed and foundered in the Hauraki Gulf. It is thought that it was deliberately scuttled as an insurance fraud.
Dolphin	Flag unknown	Chincha Islands War: The ship, a prize of the Spanish, was burn and scuttled off Valparaíso, Chile.
General Grant	United States	The wreck of General Grant at Auckland Island. The 1,200-ton barque ran aground and sank off the Auckland Islands, south of New Zealand. She was en route from Hobsons Bay, Victoria, to London carrying passengers, plus a cargo of wool, hides, and some 2,576 ounces of gold. Sixty-eight of those aboard (55 passengers and 13 crew) were lost. The remaining crew and passengers were marooned on the Auckland Islands for over a year and a half, and several of them did not survive the ordeal. They survivors were finally rescued by the whaling brig Amherst ( (United Kingdom) New Zealand) in November 1867. Several unsuccessful attempts were made to salvage gold from the wreck.
Pallion	United Kingdom	The brig ran aground on the Heppen Sand, in the Baltic Sea. She was on a voyage from Sunderland, County Durham to Swinemünde, Prussia. She was refloated.
Venetia	Flag unknown	Chicha Island War: The ship, a prize of the Spanish, was burnt and scuttled off Valparaíso.
Unnamed	Flag unknown	The brig was wrecked on the Haisborough Sands, in the North Sea off the coast of Norfolk, United Kingdom with the loss of all hands.

== 15 May ==
List of shipwrecks: 15 May 1866
Ship	State	Description
Scotia	United Kingdom	The ship foundered 40 nautical miles (74 km) off Amherst, Burma with the loss of a crew member. She was on a voyage from Moulmein, Burma to a British port.

== 16 May ==
List of shipwrecks: 16 May 1866
Ship	State	Description
Oscar	United Kingdom	The schooner ran aground on the Longsand, in the North Sea off the coast of Essex. She was on a voyage from Wardenburg, Grand Duchy of Oldenburg to Liverpool, Lancashire. She was refloated and assisted in to Harwich, Essex in a leaky condition.
Rob Roy	United Kingdom	The ship was driven ashore on "Great Wrangel Island". She was on a voyage from Leith, Lothian to Kronstadt, Russia. She was refloated and taken in to Kronstadt.

== 17 May ==
List of shipwrecks: 17 May 1866
Ship	State	Description
Andrew Shaw	United Kingdom	The ship was driven ashore at North Sunderland, County Durham. She was on a voyage from South Shields, County Durham to Kirkcaldy Fife. She was refloated and taken in to North Sunderland for temporary repairs prior to being taken in to Sunderland, County Durham.
Conquest	United Kingdom	The tug became stranded at Greenock, Renfrewshire. She was refloated.
Ellen Simpson	(United Kingdom) New South Wales	The ship was lost off Cape Howe with the loss of nine of her eleven crew.
Lion	(United Kingdom) British North America	The steamboat suffered a boiler explosion and sank in the Saint Lawrence River near Montreal, Province of Canada with the loss of five lives.
Vigilant	United Kingdom	The paddle tug became stranded at Greenock, sinking at the stern.

== 18 May ==
List of shipwrecks: 18 May 1866
Ship	State	Description
Reculvers	United Kingdom	The ship was sunk by ice off "Leskar", Russia. Her crew were rescued.
Spectator	United Kingdom	The ship was driven ashore in the Gulf of Finland. She was on a voyage from Liverpool to Vyborg, Grand Duchy of Finland. She was refloated. She was refloated with the assistance of a steamship and was taken in to Vyborg.

== 19 May ==
List of shipwrecks: 19 May 1866
Ship	State	Description
Daring, and Wave	Jersey; United Kingdom	The schooners off Flamborough Head, Yorkshire. Wave foundered instantly; her crew got on board Daring, which sank in three minutes. All on board took to the boats and reached shore. Daring was on a voyage from Sunderland, County Durham to Jersey. Wave was on a voyage from Middlesbrough, Yorkshire to Rotterdam, South Holland, Netherlands
Progress	(United Kingdom) New Zealand	The cutter was lost several miles off the mouth of the Manukau Harbour. Of the crew of three, only one made it ashore alive.

== 20 May ==
List of shipwrecks: 20 May 1866
Ship	State	Description
Annie Fisher	United Kingdom	The brig sprang a leak and was abandoned in the Atlantic Ocean. Her crew were rescued by the steamship Borussia (United Kingdom). Annie Fisher was on a voyage from Newport, Monmouthshire to Montreal, Province of Canada, British North America.
Exertion	United Kingdom	The schooner sprang a leak and was beached at Withernsea, Yorkshire. She was on a voyage from Bridlington, Yorkshire to London. She was refloated on 22 May and towed in to Grimsby, Lincolnshire for repairs.
Great Northern	United Kingdom	The steamship was driven ashore at Southport, Lancashire. She was on a voyage from Dublin to Liverpool, Lancashire.
Hastings	United Kingdom	The steamship ran aground on the Scroby Sands, Norfolk. She was on a voyage from Newcastle upon Tyne, Northumberland to Lisbon, Portugal. She was refloated with the assistance of two tugs and a boat and taken in to Great Yarmouth, Norfolk.
Providence	United Kingdom	The sloop was severely damaged at Amlwch, Anglesey when the schooner Alnwick (United Kingdom) heeled over onto her.

== 21 May ==
List of shipwrecks: 21 May 1866
Ship	State	Description
Ardgowan	United Kingdom	The paddle steamer ran aground in the Clyde at Whiteinch, Renfrewshire. She was refloated.
Maori	United Kingdom	The schooner ran aground in the River Tay. She was refloated and resumed her voyage.
Sylph	United Kingdom	The barque was wrecked 35 nautical miles (65 km) off Cape St. James. She was on a voyage from Singapore, Straits Settlements to Saigon, French Cochinchina.
Wilhelmine	Denmark	The ship ran aground at Hartlepool, County Durham, United Kingdom. She was on a voyage from Nykøbing to Stockton-on-Tees, County Durham.

== 22 May ==
List of shipwrecks: 22 May 1866
Ship	State	Description
Adele	United Kingdom	The steamship ran aground at the mouth of the Castletown River. She was on a voyage from Grangemouth, Stirlingshire to Dundalk, County Louth. She was refloated but drove ashore.
Kate	United Kingdom	The ship ran aground on the Nore. She was refloated and taken in to Southend-on-Sea, Essex.
Laura	United Kingdom	The brig was wrecked on the Burrows Sand, in the North Sea off the coast of Essex. She was on a voyage from Sunderland, County Durham to Rochester, Kent.
Plover	United Kingdom	The ship was wrecked in the Swin. Her crew were rescued by the Smack Sisters (United Kingdom). Plover was on a voyage from Sunderland to London.
Rosa de Faro	Portugal	The ship ran aground on the Longsand, in the North Sea off the coast of Essex. She was on a voyage from Hamburg to Lisbon. She was refloated and assisted in to Harwich, Essex.
Sarah Smith	United Kingdom	The ship ran agroundat Cardiff, Glamorgan and was run into by Living Age (United Kingdom). She was on a voyage from Cardiff to Martinique. She was refloated and put back to Cardiff.

== 23 May ==
List of shipwrecks: 23 May 1866
Ship	State	Description
Caudor	United Kingdom	The schooner collided with the frigate Princesa de Asturias (Spanish Navy) and sank at Barcelona, Spain.
Principessa Clotilde	Regia Marina	The corvette was driven ashore at Brook, Isle of Wight, United Kingdom. She was on a voyage from Brest, Finistère to Portsmouth, Hampshire, United Kingdom. She was refloated and taken in to Portsmouth.

== 24 May ==
List of shipwrecks: 24 May 1866
Ship	State	Description
Maid of Erin	United Kingdom	The ship ran aground at Folkestone, Kent and collided with Napoleon III (United Kingdom). She was on a voyage from Hartlepool, County Durham to Folkestone.
Topaz	United Kingdom	The schooner ran aground at Wexford. She was refloated.

== 25 May ==
List of shipwrecks: 25 May 1866
Ship	State	Description
Alpha	United Kingdom	The ship sprang a leak and foundered off the coast of Pembrokeshire.
Kusterton	United Kingdom	The sloop was abandoned in Liverpool Bay. She was towed in to Liverpool, Lancashire.
Marina	United Kingdom	The barque was wrecked on an uncharted reef off Double Island, Torres Strait (10°28′S 142°22′E) Her crew were picked up by the schooner Wild Dayrell (United Kingdom). She was on a voyage from Sydney, New South Wales to Singapore, Straits Settlements.
Sappho	United Kingdom	The steamship was driven ashore on "Somniers". She was on a voyage from Saint Petersburg, Russia to Hull, Yorkshire.
Zoar	United Kingdom	The Yorkshire Billyboy ran aground on the Gaa Bank, off the mouth of the River Tay. She was refloated and taken in to Dundee, Forfarshire.

== 26 May ==
List of shipwrecks: 26 May 1866
Ship	State	Description
Elizabeth, and Friendship	United Kingdom	The schooners collided off Land's End, Cornwall and both foundered. Their crews were rescued. Friendship was on a voyage from Plymouth, Devon to Swansea, Glamorgan.
Ellen	United Kingdom	The schooner was driven ashore in Sennen Cove, Cornwall. She was refloated. She was on a voyage from Newport, Monmouthshire to the River Yealm. She was refloated on 26 May and taken in to Penzance, Cornwall.
John Paxton	United Kingdom	The barque ran aground on the Cockle Sand, in the North Sea off the coast of Norfolk. She was on a voyage from South Shields, County Durham to Taranto, Italy. She was refloated and taken in to Great Yarmouth, Norfolk in a leaky condition.

== 27 May ==
List of shipwrecks: 27 May 1866
Ship	State	Description
Eagle	United Kingdom	The schooner ran aground on the Pagin Sand, in the North Sea and was wrecked.
Gondola	(United Kingdom) British North America	The ship was wrecked near Main-à-Dieu, Cape Breton Island, Nova Scotia. Her crew were rescued. She was on a voyage from New York, United States to Quebec City, Province of Canada.
Jessie Jones	United Kingdom	The schooner collided with the full-rigged ship Hibernia (United Kingdom) and sank in New York Bay. Her crew were rescued. She was on a voyage from Puerto Rico to New York, United States.

== 28 May ==
List of shipwrecks: 28 May 1866
Ship	State	Description
Hawk	United Kingdom	The ship ran aground and was damaged at Riga, Russia.
Ino	United Kingdom	The brigantine ran aground off Bouldnor, Isle of Wight. She was on a voyage from Yarmouth, Isle of Wight to Newcastle upon Tyne, Northumberland. She was refloated and resumed her voyage.
John Bright	United Kingdom	The steamship caught fire at Singapore, Straits Settlements. She was on a voyage from Bombay, India to Singapore.

== 29 May ==
List of shipwrecks: 29 May 1866
Ship	State	Description
Dasher	United Kingdom	The smack sank in the River Mersey.
HMS Fawn	Royal Navy	The Cruizer-class sloop was driven ashore. Subsequently refloated, repaired and returned to service.
Helens	United Kingdom	The brig collided with the barque Gilda (Italy) in the Dardanelles and was severely damaged. She was towed in to Constantinople Ottoman Empire.
Morant	(United Kingdom) Jamaica	The sloop was destroyed by fire in Dolland Bay.
Triumph	United Kingdom	The schooner ran aground on the Lorkholm Reef, in the Baltic Sea. She was refloated with the assistance of the steamship Pernau Riga (Russia) and taken in to Pärnu, Russia.

== 30 May ==
List of shipwrecks: 30 May 1866
Ship	State	Description
Brian Boru	United Kingdom	The ship ran aground at Carlingford, County Louth. She was refloated on 5 June and taken in to Warrenpoint, County Antrim.
Lady Bird	United Kingdom	The ship ran aground on Janvrin Island, Nova Scotia, British North America. She was on a voyage from Barbados to Quebec City, Province of Canada, British North America. She was refloated and taken in to Ship Harbour, Nova Scotia.

== 31 May ==
List of shipwrecks: 31 May 1866
Ship	State	Description
Charles Richard	United Kingdom	The ship was wrecked on the Scroby Sands, Norfolk. Her crew were rescued. She was on a voyage from Sunderland, County Durham to London.
Union	United Kingdom	The ship ran aground off Pakefield, Suffolk. She was on a voyage from Sunderland to Teignmouth, Devon. She was refloated, found to be severely leaky, and was beached at Lowestoft, Suffolk.

== Unknown date ==
List of shipwrecks: Unknown date in May 1866
Ship	State	Description
Alliance	(United Kingdom) Straits Settlements	The pilgrim ship was wrecked on an island off Massowah, Sultanate of Aussa. All on board were rescued.
Amandus	Stralsund	The ship sank in the North Sea. Her crew were rescued. She was on a voyage from Stralsund to Leith, Lothian, United Kingdom.
Clara Ewen	United Kingdom	The ship sank off Sagres Point, Portugal.
Clarion	United States	The schooner was lost off Newport, Rhode Island. Crew saved.
Clepper	Flag unknown	The galliot was wrecked at Lisbon, Portugal on or before 2 May.
Commodore	United Kingdom	The ship was sunk by ice off the Magdalen Islands, Nova Scotia, British North America before 7 May. She was on a voyage from a British port to Chatham, New Brunswick, British North America.
Ellen	United Kingdom	The ship was driven ashore on Red Island, Newfoundland. She was on a voyage from Swansea, Glamorgan to Quebec City, Province of Canada, British North America. She was consequently condemned.
Finland	United Kingdom	The ship was wrecked. She was on a voyage from Hull, Yorkshire to Gävle, Sweden.
Glencaira	United Kingdom	The ship was driven ashore at St. Peter's, Nova Scotia. She was on a voyage from Liverpool to Quebec City. She was refloated and completed her voyage, arriving on 15 May.
J. P. Whedore	United States	The ship was abandoned in the Atlantic Ocean before 21 May.
Lawrence	(United Kingdom) British Raj	The steamship sank in the Indus River upstream of Kotree.
Margaret Darling	United Kingdom	The ship was abandoned in the Atlantic Ocean. She was on a voyage from Ambriz, Portuguese West Africa to Liverpool, Lancashire.
Maria	(United Kingdom) New Zealand	The 161-ton schooner went aground on a spit at Hokitika ripping out the starboard side of her hull.
Roi des Bricks	France	The brig was wrecked at the mouth of the Nunez River, French Guinea.
Siam	United Kingdom	The steamship was wrecked on the Alagnada Reef.
St. Pierre	(United Kingdom) British North America	The ship was abandoned before 18 May. Her crew were rescued.
Virginia	France	The ship was wrecked. She was on a voyage from Saint Domingo to Havre de Grâce, Seine-Inférieure.
Washington	United Kingdom	The ship was wrecked in Aspy Bay before 7 May. She was on a voyage from the Clyde to Quebec City, Province of Canada, British North America.
