= Angelo Fava =

Angelo Fava (1808 - 1881) was an Italian educator, scholar, and administrator.

Fava was born in Chioggia (province of Venice) on April 8, 1808, as the son of Gian Giacomo and Teresa Meneghini. He spent his youth in Verona, where his father was a police officer. Fava studied philosophy and medicine at the University of Padua and graduated in 1830.

As a doctor, he studied cholera and other diseases. While in Turin, he oversaw the translation of biblical texts and was involved in the reforms of public education, first as an inspector and then as secretary of the Ministry. He worked with Filippo De Filippi who named a snake after Fava, Atractus favae FILIPPI 1840.
