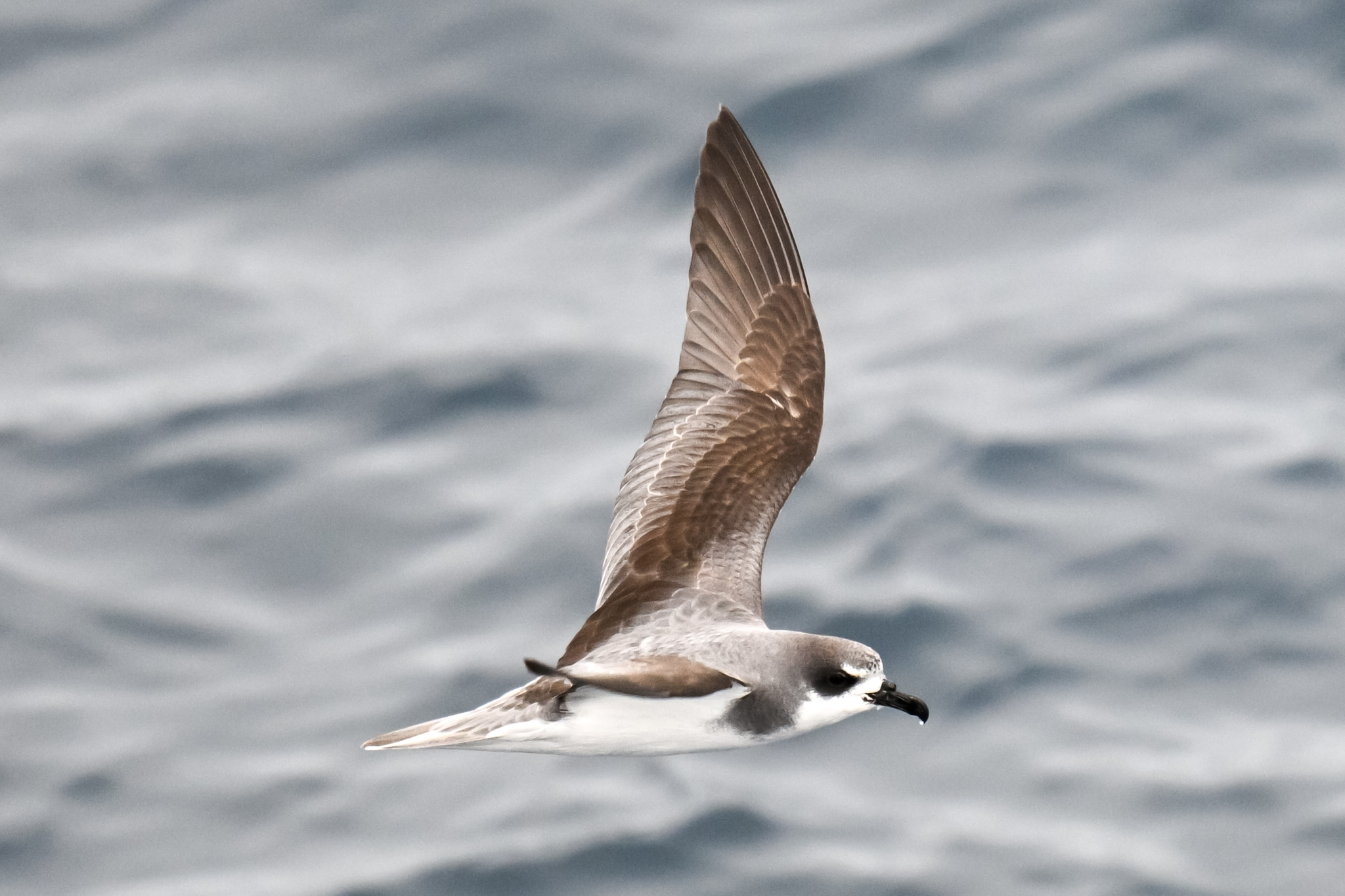

Conservation status
- Vulnerable (IUCN 3.1)

Scientific classification
- Kingdom: Animalia
- Phylum: Chordata
- Class: Aves
- Order: Procellariiformes
- Family: Procellariidae
- Genus: Pterodroma
- Species: P. defilippiana

Binomial name
- Pterodroma defilippiana (Giglioli & Salvadori, 1869)

= Masatierra petrel =

Species of bird

Masatierra petrel (Pterodroma defilippiana) or De Filippi's petrel, is a species of seabird in the family Procellariidae. It is endemic to Chile where it nests in the Juan Fernández Islands (including Masatierra) and Desventuradas Islands. Its natural habitats are open seas and rocky shores.

== Etymology ==
The petrel was first described by Enrico Hillyer Giglioli in 1869 and named in honour of the Italian zoologist Professor Filippo de Filippi. Both these naturalists took part in an Italian government-sponsored scientific voyage to circumnavigate the world in 1866. The vessel returned successfully to Naples in 1868 but de Filippi died in Hong Kong from dysentery during the previous year. Giglioli took over the scientific work of the expedition after the professor's death.

== Description ==
Masatierra petrel grows to a length of about 26 centimetres (10 in). Its cap and mask are dark grey while its forehead is white. It has dark grey plumage on its upperparts with a distinctive "M" mark, a paler grey partial collar and a white throat, belly and under wing-coverts. When seen from below, the wings have black tips and black trailing edges.

== Distribution ==
Masatierra petrel spends the greatest part of the year at sea in the eastern Pacific Ocean south of the equator where the Humboldt Current causes a major upwelling of nutrient-rich cold water. Here the bird feeds by skimming across the surface of the water and scooping up prey on the wing. It nests in two island groups off the coast of Chile. On the Desventuradas Islands, the largest colony is on San Ambrosio where more than 10,000 birds were estimated to be present in 1970. San Félix also had 150 to 200 nesting pairs at that time. On the Juan Fernández Islands, the bird is no longer believed to be nesting on Robinson Crusoe Island but Santa Clara Island had a few hundred birds present in 1991, a number not likely to increase because there is limited availability of suitable nesting sites on the island.

== Status ==
Masatierra petrel is a bird of the open ocean but returns to islands off the coast of Chile to breed on cliff ledges. The total number of birds may be fewer than 20,000 and the IUCN, in its Red List of Threatened Species, lists it as "Vulnerable". This is because of the small number of birds and limited breeding range, and the fact that land-based predators such as feral cats and coatis eat the eggs and young, and are believed to have caused the bird's extinction on Robinson Crusoe Island. Rats are also believed to be predators.
