= Atractus favae =

Conservation status
- Data Deficient (IUCN 3.1)

Scientific classification
- Kingdom: Animalia
- Phylum: Chordata
- Class: Reptilia
- Order: Squamata
- Suborder: Serpentes
- Family: Colubridae
- Genus: Atractus
- Species: A. favae

Binomial name
- Atractus favae (De Filippi, 1840)

Species of snake

Atractus favae, Filippi's ground snake, is a species of snake in the family Colubridae. The species can be found in Suriname and Guyana.

The species was named after Angelo Fava, and Italian scholar and administrator and friend of De Filippi.
