= Vittorio Arminjon =

Italian admiral

Vittorio Arminjon or Victor Arminjon (9 October 1830 – 4 February 1897) was an Italian admiral, explorer and writer.

Arminjon was born in Chambéry to Senator Mathias Arminjon and Henriette Dupy. He joined the Royal Naval School in Genoa in 1842 and became an officer in 1847. He served on the Adriatic Sea (1848-1849) and resigned in 1860 to join the French Navy commanding the Zenobia and later the Asmodeus. He was made a Knight in the Order of the Legion of Honor. He married Enrichetta Alli-Maccarani, daughter of Marquis Alli Maccarani in 1859. In 1861 he joined back with the Royal Italian Navy and served as a captain on a Frigate. In 1865 he commanded the frigate Regina from Naples to Montevideo and from there the corvette Magenta on a voyage around the world. The ship also carried the naturalists Prof. Enrico Hillyer Giglioli and Filippo de Filippi who collected and described various zoological specimens including the Trindade petrel which was named after Arminjon as Pterodroma arminjoniana. In 1866 he signed trade treaties for Italy with Japan and China. He was made Commander of the Order of Saints Maurice and Lazare in February 1867. He then served as Director of Armaments and was appointed Commander of the Royal Naval School. In 1876 he was promoted Rear Admiral and served on the ironclad warship Roma. He resigned in 1877 and spent his time studying agriculture and experimenting with applied chemistry on his lands in the Piedmont.

In 1882 on the occasion of the fourth centenary of Christopher Columbus' service to Isabella of Castile, Admiral Arminjon received the Grand'Croix of Spanish Naval Merit from King Alfonso XII of Spain.
