= Italian corvette Principessa Clotilde =

Class overview
- Name: Principessa Clotilde
- Operators: Royal Sardinian Navy; Regia Marina
- Preceded by: Etna
- Succeeded by: Caracciolo
- Completed: 1

History
- Laid down: 1861
- Launched: 1864
- Completed: 1866

General characteristics
- Type: Screw corvette
- Displacement: 2,148 long tons (2,182 t)
- Length: 66.2 m (217 ft 2 in)
- Beam: 12.5 m (41 ft)
- Draft: 5.1 m (16 ft 9 in)
- Installed power: 1 × fire-tube boiler; 400 hp (300 kW)
- Propulsion: 1 × marine steam engine; 1 × screw propeller
- Speed: 9 knots (17 km/h; 10 mph)
- Range: 800 nmi (1,500 km; 920 mi) at 9 knots
- Complement: 345
- Armament: 14 × smoothbore 160 mm (6.3 in) guns; 10 × rifled 160 mm guns

Principessa Clotilde was a screw corvette of the Italian Regia Marina (Royal Navy) built in the 1860s. The ship was originally laid down for the Royal Sardinian Navy, but by the time the ship was completed, Italy had unified, and so she entered service with the Regia Marina.

== Design ==
Principessa Clotilde was 66.2 m (217 ft 2 in) long, and she had a beam of 12.5 m (41 ft) and a draft of 5.1 m (16 ft 9 in). She displaced 2,148 long tons (2,182 t) normally and up to 2,200 long tons (2,235 t) at full load. She had a wooden hull that was sheathed with copper to protect the wooden timbers from shipworm and biofouling. The ship had a crew of 345 officers and enlisted men. Principessa Clotilde proved to be a very seaworthy vessel.

The ship was propelled by a single marine steam engine that drove a screw propeller. Steam was provided by a single fire-tube boiler that was ducted through a funnel between the fore- and main mast. The propulsion system generated a top speed of 9 knots (17 km/h; 10 mph) from 400 horsepower (300 kW). She carried 130 long tons (130 t) of coal for her boiler, which allowed Principessa Clotilde to steam for 800 nautical miles (1,500 km; 920 mi) at 9 knots. The ship was fitted with a three-masted square rig to supplement the steam engine on long voyages overseas. The ship handled poorly under sail, however, particularly sailing against the wind.

Principessa Clotilde was armed with a main battery of twenty-four 160 mm (6.3 in) iron guns. Fourteen of these were smoothbore guns in the battery deck, and the remaining ten were rifled guns placed on the upper deck. In addition, she carried four small field guns that could be sent ashore with a landing party.

== Service history ==
Principessa Clotilde was built by the Cantiere della Foce shipyard in Genoa, Italy. Her keel was laid down in 1861, originally for the Royal Sardinian Navy, but by the time she was launched in 1864, the Kingdom of Sardinia had unified the rest of the Italian states as the Kingdom of Italy. As a result, when the ship was completed in 1866, she entered service with the Regia Marina (Royal Navy).

By early May 1866, Principessa Clotilde was in active service withe the Italian fleet. At that time in home waters, there were six ironclad warships, the old ship of the line Re Galantuomo, two screw frigates, a second screw corvette, and several smaller vessels in active service. She thereafter departed for a cruise to northern European waters, which included stops in Brest, France, and Spithead in the United Kingdom, where she stopped to take on coal. While there, she exchanged gun salutes with HMS Victory and the garrison at the Portsmouth garrison. While steaming off the Isle of Wight on 26 May, Principessa Clotilde was driven ashore at Brook, Isle of Wight but was refloated and taken in to Portsmouth.

From 1868 to 1871, Principessa Clotilde embarked on a major voyage abroad. Captain Carlo Alberto Racchia served as the ship's commander for the cruise. She sailed south, around Africa, and on to East Asia. In the course of the three-year voyage, the ship traveled some 60,000 nmi (110,000 km; 69,000 mi). During the voyage, the ship visited the island of Borneo twice, first in 1868 and the second in 1870. The first visit was fairly brief, and was made while passing from Singapore to Manila in the Spanish Philippines. During the latter visit, Racchia attempted to secure a site on Borneo for an Italian penal colony, but the other European colonialist powers opposed the move, and Italy abandoned the effort. The ship nevertheless conducted an extensive survey of the coast of the island and created a large number of charts of the area. Following her return to Italy, by October 1871, she was dry-docked in La Spezia for repairs.

The ship was sent to Spanish waters during the Cantonal Revolution in 1873. While she was in Barcelona, Spain, in March 1874, she encountered the Austro-Hungarian ironclad Kaiser, which was also visiting Spain at the time. Principessa Clotilde's captain invited the Austro-Hungarian ship to join the Italians for celebrations marking the 25th anniversary of the reign of Victor Emmanuel II of Piedmont-Sardinia and then unified Italy.

The ship's career was cut short when she was laid up in 1875, after just nine years in service. The Regia Marina requested to sell the ship that year, along with the corvettes Magenta, Etna, and San Giovanni, but the Italian parliament denied the request. Only San Giovanni was permitted to be sold, owing to her age and poor condition, while Principessa Clotilde and the others were to be retained with the fleet. Etna's ultimate fate is unknown.
