= Italian corvette Etna =

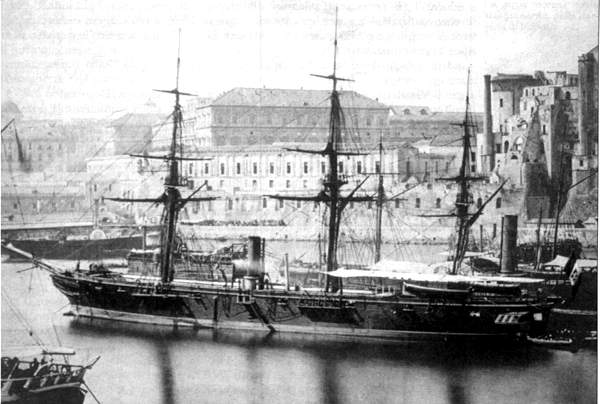
- Etna in port

Class overview
- Name: Etna
- Operators: Real Navy; Regia Marina
- Preceded by: Magenta
- Succeeded by: Principessa Clotilde
- Completed: 1

History
- Builder: Regio Cantiere di Castellammare di Stabia
- Laid down: 1860
- Launched: 17 July 1862
- Completed: 1863
- Fate: Laid up, 1875

General characteristics
- Type: Screw corvette
- Displacement: 1,538 long tons (1,563 t)
- Length: 67.6 m (221 ft 9 in)
- Beam: 10.9 m (35 ft 9 in)
- Draft: 4.3 m (14 ft 1 in)
- Installed power: 2 × fire-tube boilers; 330 hp (250 kW)
- Propulsion: 1 × marine steam engine; 1 × screw propeller
- Speed: 9 knots (17 km/h; 10 mph)
- Complement: 241
- Armament: 8 × 160 mm (6.3 in) smoothbore guns; 2 × 160 mm rifled guns

Etna was a screw corvette of the Italian Regia Marina (Royal Navy), originally ordered by the Real Marina (Royal Navy) of the Kingdom of the Two Sicilies, but completed after the unification of Italy. The ship had a relatively uneventful career, primarily cruising in the Mediterranean Sea in the 1860s, although she also made a deployment to South America from 1869 to 1871. She was laid up in 1875, but her ultimate fate is unknown.

== Design ==
Etna was 67.6 m (221 ft 9 in) long and had a beam of 10.9 m (35 ft 9 in) and a draft of 4.3 m (14 ft). She displaced 1,538 long tons (1,563 t) normally and up to 1,577 long tons (1,602 t) at full load. Her hull was constructed with wood and was fitted with copper sheathing to protect it from biofouling. Her crew numbered 241 officers and enlisted men.

The ship was powered by a single marine steam engine that drove a screw propeller. Steam was provided by a pair of fire-tube boilers that were vented through a single funnel that was located between the fore- and main mast. The engine produced 330 hp (250 kW) for a top speed of 9 knots (17 km/h; 10 mph). To supplement the steam engine on long voyages abroad, she was fitted with a three-masted square rig.

As originally built, the ship carried a main battery of eight 160 mm (6.3 in) smoothbore guns and two 160 mm rifled guns. In addition, she had a pair of small field guns that could be taken ashore with a landing party. By around 1867, her armament had been reduced to six guns of unknown caliber.

== Service history ==
The keel for Etna was laid down at the Regio Cantiere di Castellammare di Stabia (Royal Shipyard of Castellammare di Stabia) shipyard in 1860 for the Real Marina (Royal Navy) of the Kingdom of the Two Sicilies. The ship was launched on 17 July 1862, and was completed the following year. By that time, the various Italian states, including the Kingdom of the Two Sicilies, had unified as Italy, and so Etna entered service with the Regia Marina.

While in Tunis on 15 March 1865, Etna's crew observed a major dust storm. In May, Etna was involved in a minor diplomatic incident in Alexandria in the Egyptian Eyalet of the Ottoman Empire. Altercations between the ship's crew and locals led to a settlement in Italy's favor, including the deportation of the local Ottoman police deputy director. A group of Italian colonists in the region were not satisfied and rioted to protest the agreement, which prompted Etna to send a landing party ashore to suppress the riot. They arrested nineteen colonists and took them aboard Etna.

During the Third Italian War of Independence against the Austrian Empire in 1866, Etna and several other wooden vessels remained behind when the fleet that assembled to attack the island of Lissa in July, and so she did not participate in the Battle of Lissa.

The ship served in South American waters from 1869 to 1871 to protect Italian interests in the region. In 1871, while sailing off the Hornos Islets in the Río de la Plata, south of Colonia del Sacramento, Uruguay, Etna struck a submerged rock that was in about 3.7 m (12 ft) of water.

She was laid up in 1875. The Regia Marina requested to sell the ship that year, along with the corvettes Magenta, Principessa Clotilde, and San Giovanni, but the Italian parliament denied the request. Only San Giovanni was permitted to be sold, owing to her age and poor condition, while Etna and the others were to be retained with the fleet. Etna's ultimate fate is unknown.
