= Italian corvette Caracciolo (1869) =

- Caracciolo cruising under sail

Class overview
- Name: Caracciolo
- Operators: Regia Marina (Royal Navy)
- Preceded by: Principessa Clotilde
- Succeeded by: Vettor Pisani
- Completed: 1

History
- Builder: Regio Cantiere di Castellammare di Stabia
- Laid down: October 1865
- Launched: 18 January 1869
- Completed: 20 July 1870
- Fate: Discarded, 10 March 1907

General characteristics
- Type: Screw corvette
- Displacement: 1,553 long tons (1,578 t)
- Length: 64.3 m (210 ft 11 in) pp
- Beam: 10.94 m (35 ft 11 in)
- Draft: 4.97 m (16 ft 4 in)
- Installed power: 4 × fire-tube boilers; 973 ihp (726 kW)
- Propulsion: 1 × marine steam engine; 1 × screw propeller
- Speed: 9.2 knots (17.0 km/h; 10.6 mph)
- Range: 960 nmi (1,780 km; 1,100 mi) at 8.5 knots (15.7 km/h; 9.8 mph)
- Complement: 247
- Armament: 6 × 160 mm (6.3 in) guns

Caracciolo was a screw corvette of the Italian Regia Marina (Royal Navy) built in the 1860s. She was the first vessel of that type built after the unification of Italy, though the Italian fleet inherited several screw corvettes from the navies of Naples, Tuscany, and Sardinia. The ship was armed with a main battery of six 160 mm (6.3 in) guns. Originally built with both steam and sail propulsion, Caracciolo later had her engine removed for use as a training ship.

== Design ==
The design for Caracciolo, sometimes referred to as Francesco Caracciolo, was prepared by the naval engineer Giuseppe Micheli; she was the first screw corvette to be built by Italy following the unification of the country in 1861, though the unified Regia Marina (Royal Navy) inherited several sail and screw corvettes from the navies of the constituent countries, including Naples, Tuscany, and Sardinia.

The ship was 64.3 meters (210 ft 11 in) long between perpendiculars, and she had a beam of 10.94 m (35 ft 11 in) and an average draft of 4.97 m (16 ft 4 in). She displaced 1,553 long tons (1,578 t). She had a crew of 247. Her hull was of wooden construction, and it was sheathed with copper to prevent marine biofouling during extended cruises.

Her propulsion system consisted of a single marine steam engine that drove a single screw propeller. Steam was supplied by four coal-fired fire-tube boilers that were manufactured by the firm Guppy of Naples. Caracciolo could steam at a top speed of 9.2 knots (17.0 km/h; 10.6 mph) from 973 indicated horsepower (726 kW). The ship had a storage capacity of 144 t (142 long tons; 159 short tons) of coal for the boilers. While steaming at a speed of 8.5 knots (15.7 km/h; 9.8 mph), the ship could cruise for 960 nautical miles (1,780 km; 1,100 mi). To supplement the steam engines, she was fitted with a full ship rig. During an extensive modification in 1893–1894, the ship's engine was removed and she relied solely on her sailing rig.

The main battery for Caracciolo originally consisted of six 160-millimeter (6.3 in) muzzle-loading guns, which were cast-iron weapons that were built-up for greater strength. They were carried on the upper deck, three guns per broadside. In 1875, a single 381 mm (15 in) torpedo tube was installed, though this was only retained for five years. During the 1893–1894 reconstruction, she was rearmed with a light armament consisting of two 75 mm (3 in) guns and four 57 mm (2.2 in) guns.

== Service history ==
The keel for Caracciolo was laid down in October 1865, originally under the name Brilliante. Her name was changed to Caracciolo in January 1869 and she was launched on the 18th. Fitting out work was completed on 20 July 1870. In 1871, Caracciolo was sent overseas to South America. She was stationed in Montevideo, Uruguay at that time. By 1873, she had been moved to La Plata, Argentina, where she led a small division that also included the three screw gunboats Ardita, Confienza, and Veloce. In 1875, Caracciolo was converted into a training ship for torpedo operators; she temporarily carried a torpedo tube through 1880 for this role.

The ship embarked on a circumnavigation of the globe in 1881, which was used to gather navigation data as well as samples of marine animals. She sailed south through the Atlantic to South America; she conducted extensive hydrographic surveys along the coast of Patagonia and the Strait of Magellan. During the tour of South American waters, she visited Valparaíso, Chile. By 1883, she had reached Australia; in December, she rendezvoused in Singapore with the screw corvette Cristoforo Colombo, which had been sent to protect Italian nationals in China. The two ships then sailed north to China, where they patrolled the area to protect Italian nationals in the event of a conflict. By July, Caracciolo had departed, though the corvette Vettor Pisani had been sent to take her place. She returned to Australian waters, cruising there through 1884, during which time she visited Sydney and Melbourne. Caracciolo completed her journey later that year. During the lengthy voyage abroad, seventeen men from her crew deserted, though more than eighty men who had begun the cruise illiterate had learned to read and write.

In 1892, Caracciolo served in the Training Squadron attached to the Italian naval academy at Livorno. That year, she went on a training cruise with the other vessels of the squadron, including the screw corvette Flavio Gioia and the old screw frigate Vittorio Emanuele, supported by the transport ship Conte di Cavour. The voyage began in July and lasted for three and a half months, and included stops in the Azores, Gibraltar, Vigo and Cartagena in Spain, the Balearic Islands, and La Maddalena, Italy, before returning to Livorno. Caracciolo was part of the Reserve Squadron in 1895, serving as a boys' training ship. She was supported by four tenders at that time, and she was based in La Spezia. She was assigned to the Training Squadron in 1904, along with the old ironclads Lepanto, Castelfidardo, and Affondatore and the screw corvette Flavio Gioia. At that time, Caracciolo operated as a boys' training vessel. In October that year, Caracciolo and the screw corvette Amerigo Vespucci visited Toulon, France. The ship was discarded on 10 March 1907, though her ultimate fate is unknown.
