= Italian corvette Amerigo Vespucci =

Screw corvette of the Italian Regia Marina

- Amerigo Vespucci in December 1898

Class overview
- Name: Amerigo Vespucci
- Operators: Regia Marina (Royal Navy)
- Preceded by: Flavio Gioia
- Succeeded by: Cristoforo Colombo
- Completed: 1

History
- Builder: Venice Naval Yard
- Laid down: 9 December 1879
- Launched: 31 July 1882
- Completed: 1 September 1884
- Fate: Discarded, 10 September 1920

General characteristics
- Type: Screw corvette
- Displacement: Normal: 2,493 long tons (2,533 t); Full load: 2,751 long tons (2,795 t)
- Length: 78 m (255 ft 11 in) pp
- Beam: 12.78 m (41 ft 11 in)
- Draft: 5.48 m (18 ft)
- Installed power: 8 × fire-tube boilers; 3,340 ihp (2,491 kW)
- Propulsion: 1 × marine steam engine; 1 × screw propeller
- Speed: 13.66 knots (25.30 km/h; 15.72 mph)
- Complement: 268
- Armament: 8 × 149 mm (5.9 in) guns; 3 × 75 mm (3 in) guns; 4 × Maxim machine guns

Amerigo Vespucci was a screw corvette of the Italian Regia Marina (Royal Navy) built in the late 1870s and early 1880s.

== Design ==
The design for Amerigo Vespucci was prepared by the naval engineer Carlo Vigna, who also designed the similar corvette Flavio Gioia. The Italian navy still largely relied on a fleet of old wooden-hulled cruising ships built in the 1850s and 1860s, but by the 1870s, the world's navies had begun to move to steel construction. The Italians responded with Flavio Gioia and Amerigo Vespucci as part of a modest program to modernize its cruising fleet. The two vessels were similar enough that some sources consider them to have been the same class, though others consider them to be distinct designs.

=== Characteristics ===
Amerigo Vespucci in Toulon in 1902

Amerigo Vespucci was 78 meters (255 ft 11 in) long between perpendiculars, and she had a beam of 12.78 m (41 ft 11 in) and an average draft of 5.48 m (18 ft). She displaced 2,493 long tons (2,533 t) normally and 2,751 long tons (2,795 t) at full load. The ship had a traditional clipper bow and an overhanging stern. Her superstructure was minimal, consisting primarily of a small conning tower placed amidships. She had a crew of 268.

Her propulsion system consisted of a single horizontal, 3-cylinder compound steam engine that drove a single screw propeller. Steam was supplied by eight coal-fired fire-tube boilers that vented into a single funnel located amidships. Her propulsion system was manufactured by Gio. Ansaldo & C. Amerigo Vespucci could steam at a top speed of 13.66 knots (25.30 km/h; 15.72 mph) from 3,340 indicated horsepower (2,490 kW) on her initial sea trials. The ship had a capacity to store 500 long tons (510 t) of coal for the boilers. To supplement the steam engines, she was fitted with a three-masted barque rig.

The main battery for Amerigo Vespucci consisted of eight 149-millimeter (5.9 in) 26-caliber breech-loading guns, four guns per broadside. For close-range defense against torpedo boats, she carried a secondary battery of three 75 mm (3 in) guns. She was also fitted with four Maxim machine guns of unknown caliber. In 1893, she was rearmed with four 120 mm (4.7 in) 40 cal. guns and two 356 mm (14 in) torpedo tubes. The ship was protected by a curved armor deck that was 38 mm (1.5 in) thick, with a layer of extensively subdivided series of watertight compartments below, which was intended to control flooding in the event of damage below the waterline.

== Service history ==
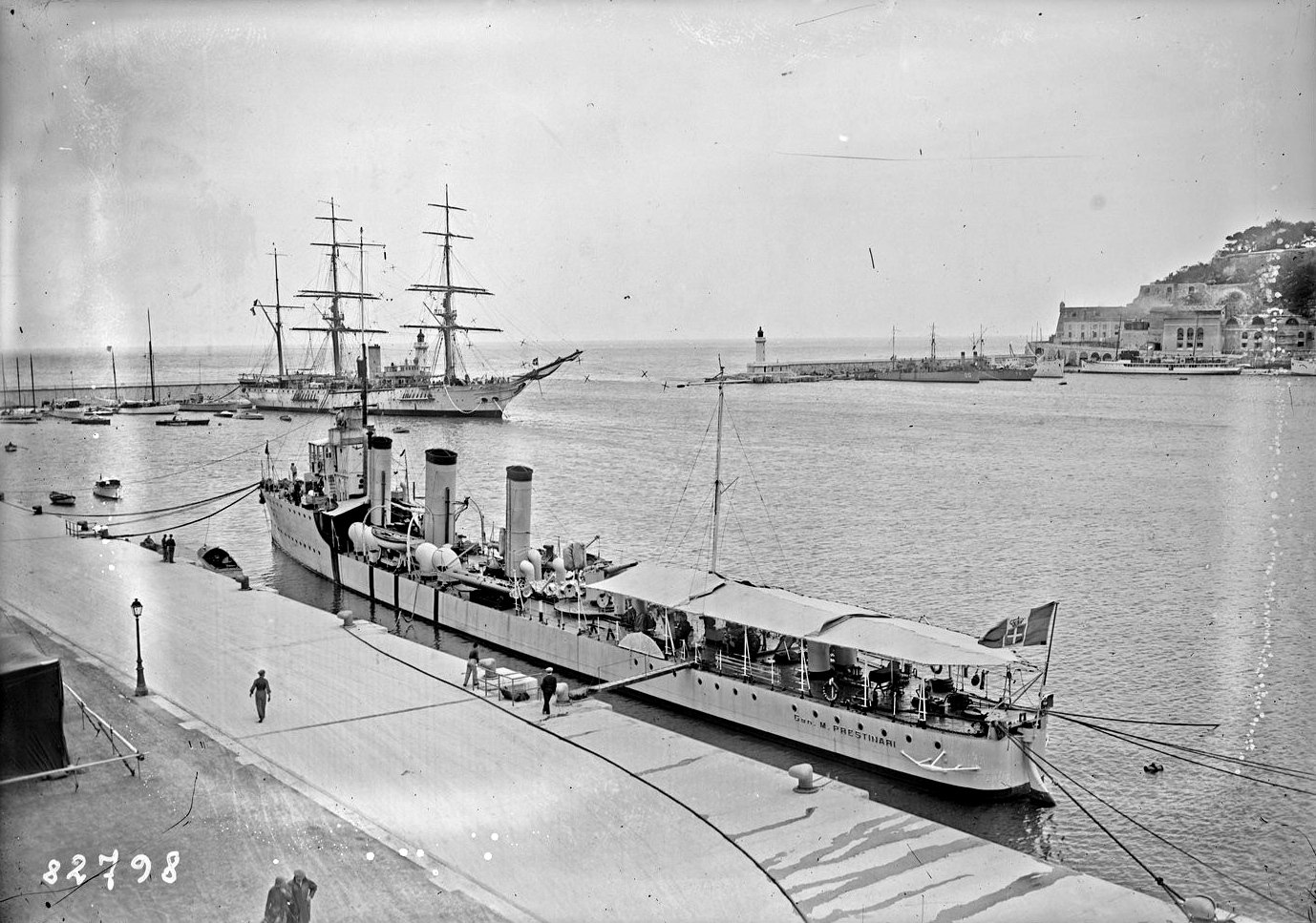
Amerigo Vespucci in port in 1923 along with the destroyer Generale Marcello Prestinari

Work on Amerigo Vespucci began with her keel laying on 9 December 1879, and her completed hull was launched on 31 July 1882. Fitting out was completed on 1 September 1884. The next year, Amerigo Vespucci took part in the annual fleet maneuvers. During the exercises, she formed part of the "Eastern Squadron", along with the ironclad warships Castelfidardo and Principe Amedeo, a sloop, and four torpedo boats. The "Eastern Squadron" defended against an attacking "Western Squadron", simulating a Franco-Italian conflict, with operations conducted off Sardinia.

In 1893, the vessel was converted into a training ship; she served in this capacity for more than three decades, though she also filled other roles as well. On 1 October that year, she was assigned to the 3rd Department, which was stationed in Venice. In 1895, Amerigo Vespucci was stationed in Naples and Taranto as a special service ship. The ship was assigned to the Flying Squadron in 1896, along with the armored cruiser Marco Polo, the protected cruisers Elba and Umbria, and the vessel Volta. In 1899, Amerigo Vespucci was sent to East Asia, again in company with Marco Polo and Elba.

By 1902, Amerigo Vespucci had returned to Italian waters, where she was assigned to the Training Squadron with Flavio Gioia and the gunboat Curtatone. That year, Flavio Gioia spent ten months in commission for training activities. She embarked on a tour of Europe in company with Curtatone that included stops in Germany, Britain, France, in Spain and concluded with the ships' return to La Spezia, Italy. In October 1904, Amerigo Vespucci and the old wooden screw corvette Caracciolo visited Toulon, France. The ship remained in service on training duty until she was ultimately discarded on 22 January 1928. Her ultimate fate is unknown.
