= Italian corvette Vettor Pisani =

Screw corvette of the Italian Regia Marina

- Illustration of Vettor Pisani c. 1879

Class overview
- Name: Vettor Pisani
- Operators: Regia Marina (Royal Navy)
- Preceded by: Caracciolo
- Succeeded by: Cristoforo Colombo
- Completed: 1

History
- Builder: Venice Naval yard
- Laid down: 11 May 1867
- Launched: 22 July 1869
- Completed: 10 April 1871
- Fate: Discarded, 12 February 1893

General characteristics
- Type: Screw corvette
- Displacement: 1,676 long tons (1,703 t)
- Length: 65.1 m (213 ft 7 in) pp
- Beam: 11.84 m (38 ft 10 in)
- Draft: 5.28 m (17 ft 4 in)
- Installed power: 2 × fire-tube boilers; 1,004 ihp (749 kW)
- Propulsion: 1 × marine steam engine; 1 × screw propeller
- Speed: 9.76 knots (18.08 km/h; 11.23 mph)
- Complement: 226
- Armament: 4 × 160 mm (6.3 in) guns; 10 × 120 mm (4.7 in) guns; 3 × 80 mm (3.1 in) guns

Vettor Pisani was a screw corvette of the Italian Regia Marina (Royal Navy) built in the late 1860s and early 1870s, originally with the name Briosa, though she was renamed Vettor Pisani before work was completed. A wooden-hulled corvette with a coppered bottom, Vettor Pisani was armed with a battery of fourteen medium-caliber guns and used both a steam engine and a sailing rig for propulsion. The ship made three voyages round the world, the first from 1871 to 1873; the second from 1874 to 1877; and the third from 1882 to 1885. The last cruise saw the crew conduct a number of scientific experiments, chart significant sections of the ocean, and collect specimens for later study in Italy. Converted to a training ship after returning to Italy in 1885, Vettor Pisani remained in service for several more years before being discarded in 1893; the ship's ultimate fate is unknown.

== Design ==
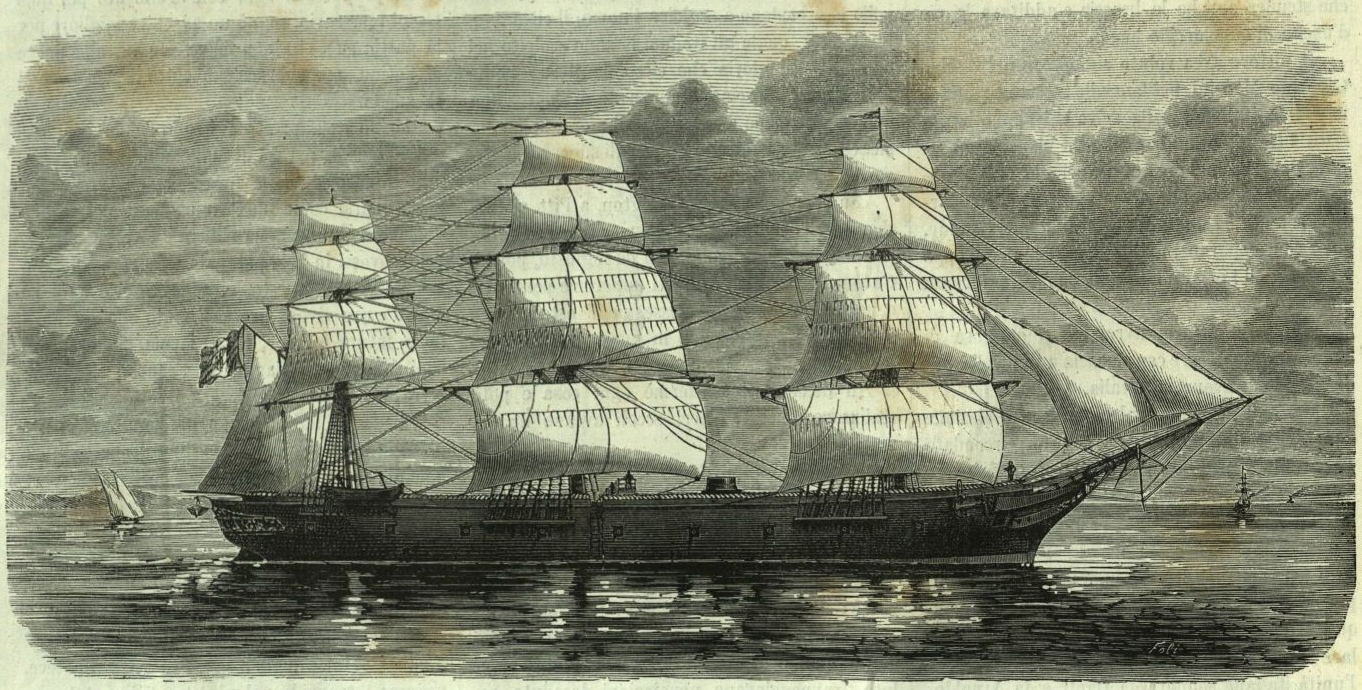
Engraving of Vettor Pisani from 1873

The design for Vettor Pisani was prepared by the naval engineer Giuseppe Micheli. Vettor Pisani was 65.1 meters (213 ft 7 in) long between perpendiculars, and she had a beam of 11.84 m (38 ft 10 in) and an average draft of 5.28 m (17 ft 4 in). She displaced 1,676 long tons (1,703 t). Her hull was constructed of wood and was sheathed with copper to protect it from biofouling during lengthy periods at sea. She had a crew of 226.

Her propulsion system consisted of a single marine steam engine that drove a single screw propeller. Steam was supplied by a pair of coal-fired fire-tube boilers that were manufactured by the firm Guppy of Naples. Vettor Pisani could steam at a top speed of 9.76 knots (18.08 km/h; 11.23 mph) from 1,004 indicated horsepower (749 kW). To supplement the steam engines, she was fitted with a square-rigged, three-masted full ship rig.

The main battery for Vettor Pisani consisted of four rifled 160 mm (6.3 in) built-up guns and ten rifled 120 mm (4.7 in) built-up guns. She also carried three 80 mm (3.1 in) bronze guns.. Her armament was replaced entirely during a refit; her main guns were six 120 mm muzzle-loading guns, three guns per broadside, and a secondary battery of two 75 mm (3 in) guns, two 57 mm (2.2 in) guns, and two 37 mm (1.5 in) guns were added for close-range defense against torpedo boats. During another refit in 1879, she was rearmed with a main battery of ten 120 mm breech-loading guns. Four of these guns were removed in 1885.

== Service history ==
The ship was laid down on 11 May 1867 in the Venice Naval Yard, during a period of naval retrenchment in Italy, following the navy's humiliating defeat at the Battle of Lissa the previous year. Sharply reduced naval budgets slowed construction of new ships. Work on the ship began with the vessel originally under the name Briosa, but while still under construction in 1868, she was renamed Vettor Pisani. Her completed hull was launched on 22 July 1869. Fitting out was completed by 10 April 1871.

=== Overseas cruises ===
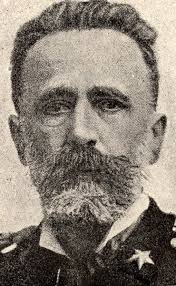
Admiral Giuseppe Palumbo, who commanded Vettor Pisani during her third circumnavigation

After entering service, Vettor Pisani was sent on a cruise to circumnavigate the globe, which she completed between 1871 and 1873. Her commander for the voyage was Captain G. Lovera di Maria. Already in 1871, she had reached Japanese waters. In early 1872, she had sailed south to Singapore, and on 19 May, the ship departed for another visit to Japan. While passing through the South China Sea, the crew conducted extensive hydrographic surveys to chart the region between 6 and 10 June. Vettor Pisani arrived in Yokohama, Japan, on 6 August. She continued her cruise through the region over the rest of the year, which included visits to Australia and New Guinea. While cruising south of New Guinea on 17 December 1872, Vettor Pisani discovered a natural harbor on the island of Kai Kecil that her captain named Princess Margherita Harbor, after Princess Margherita. The crew conducted surveys of the area so that it could be used as an anchorage. The ship had reached Orangerie Bay on the southeast corner of New Guinea by 7 January 1873. There, three days later, her crew discovered an inner anchorage, which they named Vettor Pisani Harbor. She was still in Australian waters in 1873, and arrived home later that year.

Vettor Pisani completed a second voyage around the world that lated from 1874 to 1877. During this voyage, the ship was captained by Prince Tommaso, Duke of Genoa. The ship's route took her through the Suez Canal and Red Sea under steam, and then across the Indian Ocean, which was primarily crossed by sail, at an average pace of 240 to 260 nautical miles (440 to 480 km; 280 to 300 mi) per day. By early 1875, the ship had reached Singapore, which she departed on 4 March, bound for Batavia in the Dutch East Indies. After arriving there on 7 March, she took on coal and then continued on to Makassar. Vettor Pisani was to have taken the prince to Yokohama for a major reception, but an outbreak of cholera prevented the ship from stopping in the city. Instead, the ship sailed north to Vladivostok, Russia. After arriving home in 1877, the ship was modernized in 1879. Later that year, she embarked on a third cruise abroad, this time to China, where she remained until 1881, when she returned home.

Vettor Pisani embarked on her third circumnavigation in 1882, which lasted to 1885. The voyage had a variety of goals, including training the crew, showing the flag, and conducting extensive scientific experiments. These tests included hydrographic surveys, depth soundings, and collection of marine animals for later study. A temporary laboratory was set up in the gun battery deck. The ship's captain was Commander Giuseppe Palumbo for the duration of the voyage. Lieutenants Cesare Marcacci and Gaetano Chierchia were responsible for supervising most of the experiments, and Chierchia had been sent to study at the Zoological Station at Naples for three months before the trip. Anton Dohrn, the director of the facility, came aboard Vettor Pisani to discuss the expedition before the vessel sent sail, and he later welcomed the ship home. The ship departed from Naples on 20 April 1882.

Vettor Pisani conducted surveys off the coast of South America, including around the Chonos Archipelago between 23 November and 6 December 1882. Later, during an exploration of the Gulf of Corcovado, Vettor Pisani ran aground twice but her crew was able to free the vessel at high tide both times. While there, the captain named several islands that had previously not been named. In early 1883, Vettor Pisani visited Valparaíso, Chile; from there, she sailed to Coquimbo and then Caldera, where she conducted extensive surveys of the coast, which had been dangerous for merchant vessels due to insufficient charts. In March 1884, she arrived in the Galápagos Islands, where she conducted further tests. Vettor Pisani then crossed the Pacific, conducting additional surveys along the way, including near the Hawaiian Islands. While still overseas later in 1884, Vettor Pisani was sent to East Asian waters to reinforce the Italian presence there, which at that time consisted of the screw corvette Cristoforo Colombo, during a period of tension that resulted in the Sino-French War. Vettor Pisani arrived back in Italy on 29 April 1885, having collected some 1,600 specimens over the course of the voyage. These included land and sea animals, plants, algae, and samplings of the sea floor, which were studied in several universities organized by the Royal Accademia dei Lincei.

=== Later career ===
Later in 1885, she was reduced to a training ship for naval cadets at the Italian naval academy in Livorno. She served in this capacity until the early 1890s, and on 12 February 1893, the Italian navy discarded the ship. She was struck from the naval register that year. Her ultimate fate is unknown.
