= Iranolacerta brandtii =

Conservation status
- Data Deficient (IUCN 3.1)

Scientific classification
- Kingdom: Animalia
- Phylum: Chordata
- Class: Reptilia
- Order: Squamata
- Family: Lacertidae
- Genus: Iranolacerta
- Species: I. brandtii

Binomial name
- Iranolacerta brandtii (De Filippi, 1863)

Synonyms
- Lacerta brandtii De Filippi, 1863; Darevskia brandtii — Arribas, 1997; Iranoacerta brandtii — Arnold, Arribas & Carranza, 2007

Species of lizard

Iranolacerta brandtii, also known commonly as Brandt's Persian lizard, is a species of lizard in the family Lacertidae. The species is native to eastern Europe and western Asia. There are two recognized subspecies.

== Etymology ==
I. brandtii is named after Johann Friedrich von Brandt, a German zoologist, surgeon, pharmacologist, and botanist.

== Geographic range ==
I. brandtii is found in southern Azerbaijan, northwestern Iran, and Turkey.

== Habitat ==
The preferred natural habitats of I. brandtii are rocky areas, grassland, and shrubland, at altitudes of 500–2,600 m (1,600–8,500 ft).

== Reproduction ==
I. brandti is oviparous.

== Subspecies ==
Two subspecies are recognized as being valid, including the nominotypical subspecies.

- Iranolacerta brandtii brandtii (De Filippi, 1863)
- Iranolacerta brandtii esfahanica (Nilson, N. Rastegar-Pouyani, E. Rastegar-Pouyani & Andrén, 2003)

Nota bene: A trinomial authority in parentheses indicates that the subspecies was originally described in a genus other than Iranolacerta.
