= Italian corvette Flavio Gioia =

Screw corvette of the Italian Regia Marina

- Flavio Gioia, date unknown

Class overview
- Name: Flavio Gioia
- Operators: Regia Marina (Royal Navy)
- Preceded by: Cristoforo Colombo
- Succeeded by: Amerigo Vespucci
- Completed: 1

History
- Builder: Regio Cantiere di Castellammare di Stabia
- Laid down: 26 June 1879
- Launched: 12 June 1881
- Completed: 26 January 1883
- Fate: Discarded, 10 September 1920

General characteristics
- Type: Screw corvette
- Displacement: 2,493 long tons (2,533 t)
- Length: 78 m (255 ft 11 in) pp
- Beam: 12.78 m (41 ft 11 in)
- Draft: 5.19 m (17 ft)
- Installed power: 8 × fire-tube boilers; 4,156 ihp (3,099 kW)
- Propulsion: 1 × marine steam engine; 1 × screw propeller
- Speed: 14 knots (26 km/h; 16 mph)
- Complement: 268
- Armament: 8 × 149 mm (5.9 in) guns; 3 × 75 mm (3 in) guns

Flavio Gioia was a screw corvette of the Italian Regia Marina (Royal Navy) built in the late 1870s and early 1880s.

== Design ==
The design for Flavio Gioia was prepared by the naval engineer Carlo Vigna; the ship was the first steel-hulled cruising vessel of the Italian Regia Marina (Royal Navy). The Italian navy still largely relied on a fleet of old wooden-hulled cruising ships built in the 1850s and 1860s, but by the 1870s, the world's navies had begun to move to steel construction. The Italians responded with Flavio Gioia and the similar Amerigo Vespucci as part of a modest program to modernize its cruising fleet. The two vessels were similar enough that some sources consider them to have been the same class, though others consider them to be distinct designs.

=== Characteristics ===
The ship was 78 meters (255 ft 11 in) long between perpendiculars, and she had a beam of 12.78 m (41 ft 11 in) and an average draft of 5.19 m (17 ft). She displaced 2,493 long tons (2,533 t). The ship had a traditional clipper bow and an overhanging stern. Her superstructure was minimal, consisting primarily of a small conning tower placed amidships. She had a crew of 268.

Her propulsion system consisted of a single horizontal, 3-cylinder compound steam engine that drove a single screw propeller. Steam was supplied by eight coal-fired fire-tube boilers that vented into a single funnel located amidships. Flavio Gioia could steam at a top speed of 14 knots (26 km/h; 16 mph) from 4,156 indicated horsepower (3,099 kW). The ship had a capacity to store 500 long tons (510 t) of coal for the boilers. To supplement the steam engines, she was fitted with a three-masted barque rig.

The main battery for Flavio Gioia consisted of eight 149-millimeter (5.9 in) 40-caliber breech-loading guns, four guns per broadside. For close-range defense against torpedo boats, she carried a secondary battery of three 75 mm (3 in) guns. In 1892, she was rearmed with four 120 mm (4.7 in) 40 cal. guns and two 356 mm (14 in) torpedo tubes. The ship was protected by a curved armor deck that was 38 mm (1.5 in) thick, with a layer of extensively subdivided series of watertight compartments below, which was intended to control flooding in the event of damage below the waterline.

== Service history ==
The keel for Flavio Gioia was laid down on 26 June 1879 at the Regio Cantiere di Castellammare di Stabia shipyard in Castellammare di Stabia. Her completed hull was launched on 12 June 1881 and fitting out was completed by 26 June 1883.

In 1892, Flavio Gioia was rearmed and converted into a training ship. Later that year, Flavio Gioia joined the Training Squadron attached to the Italian naval academy at Livorno. In July, she went on a training cruise with the other vessels of the squadron, including the screw corvette Caracciolo and the old screw frigate Vittorio Emanuele, supported by the transport ship Conte di Cavour. The voyage lasted for three and a half months, and included stops in the Azores, Gibraltar, Vigo and Cartagena in Spain, the Balearic Islands, and La Maddalena, Italy, before returning to Livorno. On 1 October 1893, she was assigned to the 3rd Department, which was stationed in Venice; she remained there through the following year. Beginning on 14 October, the Italian fleet, including Flavio Gioia, assembled in Genoa for a naval review held in honor of King Umberto I at the commissioning of the new ironclad Re Umberto. The festivities lasted three days. Flavio Gioia operated as a cadet training vessel in company with the corvette Cristoforo Colombo in 1895. Flavio Gioia was based in Naples and Taranto that year.

In 1902, she was assigned to the Training Squadron with Amerigo Vespucci and the gunboat Curtatone. That year, Flavio Gioia spent ten months in commission for training activities. Flavio Gioia remained in the Training Squadron in 1903, and for four months of the year, she was attached to the Italian naval academy. The Training Squadron had been expanded by 1904; Flavio Gioia served as the main cadet training ship with the Italian naval academy, while the old ironclads Castelfidardo, Affondatore, and Lepanto served as gunnery and torpedo training ships, and the corvette Caracciolo operated as a boys' training vessel. The ship remained in service until she was stricken on 10 September 1920. She was thereafter renamed CM181 and was used as a training ship in Naples until 4 March 1923. During this period, she was unofficially referred to as Caracciolo. Her ultimate fate is unknown.
