= Filippo De Filippi =

Italian zoologist (1814–1867)

Filippo De Filippi (20 April 1814 – 9 February 1867) was an Italian medical doctor, traveler and zoologist.

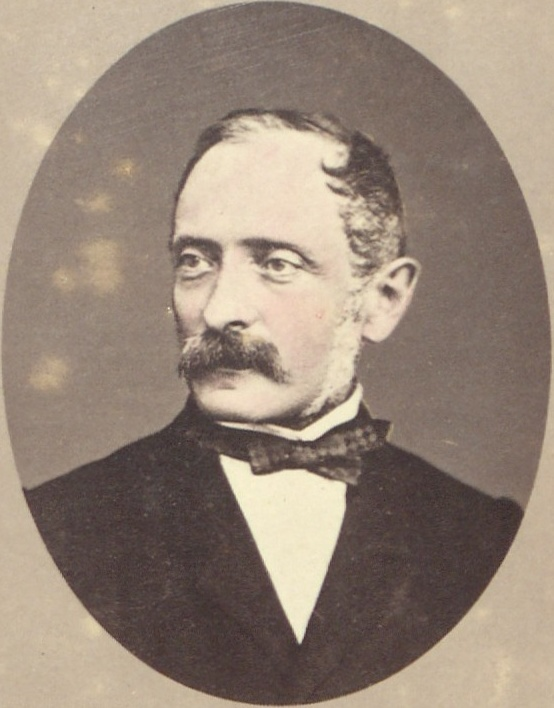
Filippo De Filippi

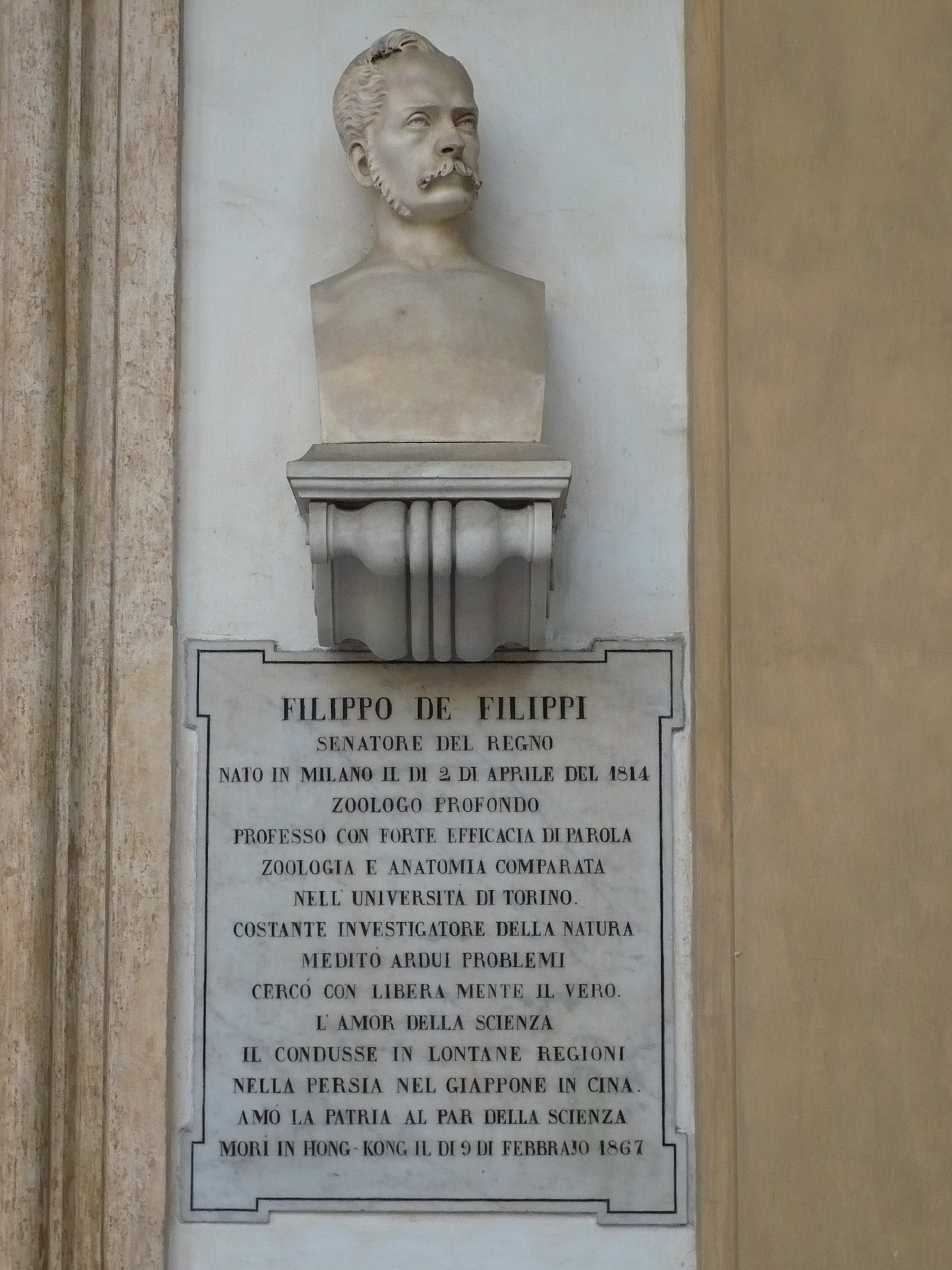
Bust of Filippo De Filippi, University of Turin

== Career ==
Filippo De Filippi was born in Pavia. In 1836, he received his medical degree from the University of Pavia, where afterwards he worked as an assistant to the chair of zoology. From 1840 he worked at the museum of natural history in Milan. In 1848 he succeeded Giuseppe Gené as professor of zoology and comparative anatomy at the University of Turin.

He was the director of the scientific group affiliated with the first official mission sent to Persia in 1862, intended to re-establish diplomatic relations between the two countries. While here, he maintained a diary that subsequently became an interesting travel book on the country. Upon his return to Italy, he wrote a number of articles on the botany and zoology of Persia.

Later he became a senator of the Kingdom of Italy, but De Filippi set out in 1866 on a government-sponsored scientific voyage to circumnavigate the globe. The ship, the Italian corvette Magenta, sailed under the command of Vittorio Arminjon, departing Montevideo on 2 February 1866. It reached Naples on 28 March 1868. However, De Filippi himself died en route at Hong Kong, on 9 February 1867 from serious dysentery and liver problems. He was 52 years old.

The scientific report was completed by his assistant, Professor Enrico Hillyer Giglioli, who returned to Italy in 1868.

== Scientific work ==
His name is associated with the following species:

- Masatierra petrel (Pterodroma defilippiana)
- Causus defilippii (Jan, 1862), also known as the snouted night adder.
- Darevskia defilippii (Camerano, 1877), also known as the Elburs lizard.

Filippi also described a number of new species, including four reptile species:

- Atractus favae (De Filippi 1840), named after Angelo Fava
- Iranolacerta brandtii (De Filippi 1863)
- Laudakia nupta (De Filippi 1843)
- Phrynocephalus persicus De Filippi 1863

== Darwinism ==
De Filippi embraced transformism before discovering Charles Darwin's On the Origin of Species. He was an opponent of Georges Cuvier's catastrophism.

He was one of the earliest supporters of Darwinism in Italy. In 1864, he gave a controversial lecture entitled Sull'uomo e le scimmie (On Man and Apes).

== Works ==
- Uomo e le scimie (in Italian). Milano: Daelli. 1864.

== See also ==
- European and American voyages of scientific exploration
- Category:Taxa named by Filippo De Filippi
