= Italian corvette Cristoforo Colombo (1875) =

Screw corvette of the Italian Regia Marina

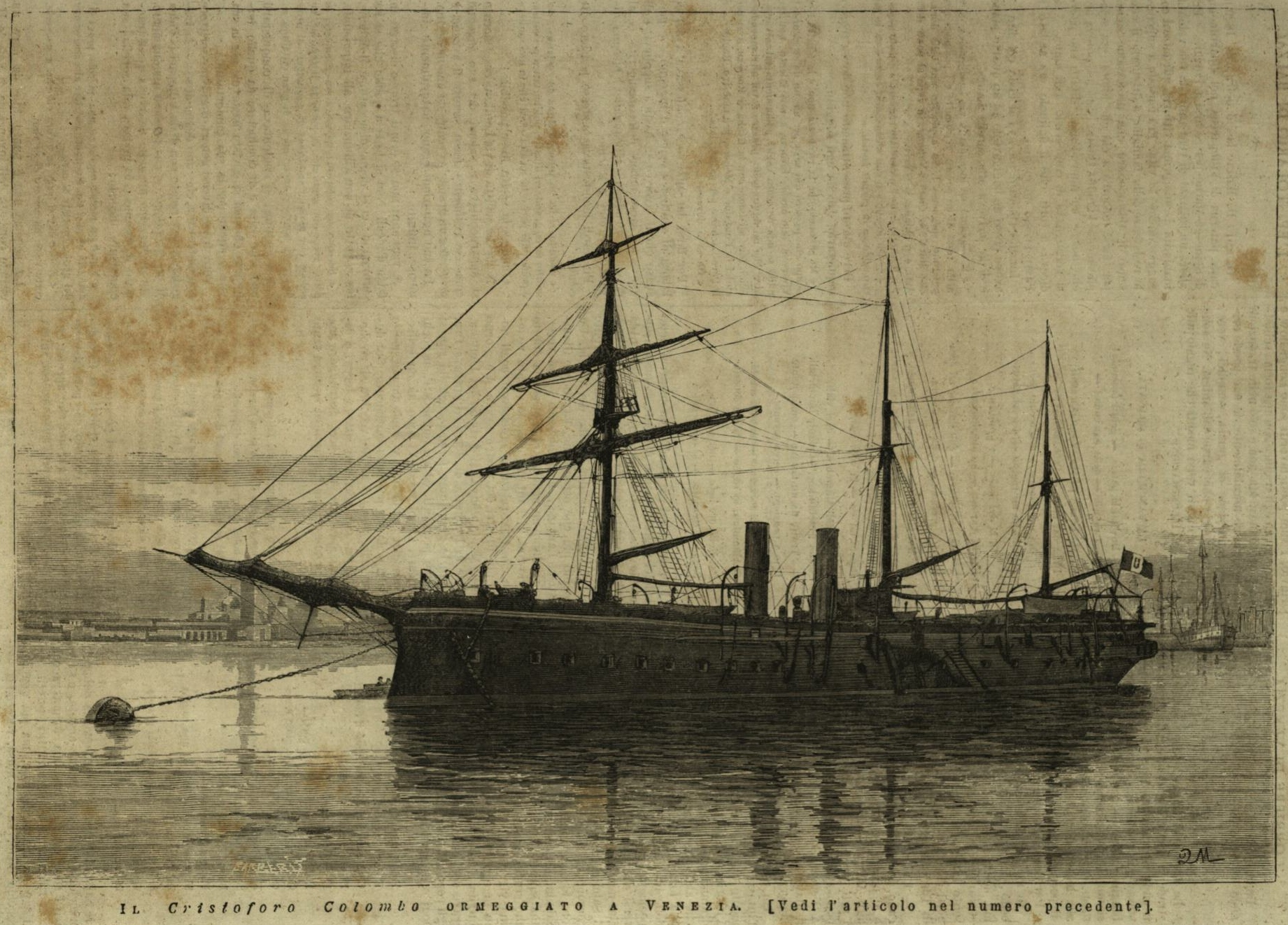
- Cristoforo Colombo in Venice, c. 1877

Class overview
- Name: Cristoforo Colombo
- Builders: Venice Naval Yard
- Operators: Regia Marina (Royal Navy)
- Preceded by: Vettor Pisani
- Succeeded by: Flavio Gioia
- Completed: 1

History
- Builder: Venice Naval yard
- Laid down: 1 February 1873
- Launched: 17 September 1875
- Completed: 16 November 1876
- Fate: Discarded, 1891

General characteristics
- Type: Screw corvette
- Displacement: 2,325 long tons (2,362 t)
- Length: 75.72 m (248 ft 5 in) pp
- Beam: 11.3 m (37 ft 1 in)
- Draft: 4.25 m (13 ft 11 in)
- Installed power: 6 × fire-tube boilers; 3,782 ihp (2,820 kW)
- Propulsion: 1 × marine steam engine; 1 × screw propeller
- Speed: 16 knots (30 km/h; 18 mph)
- Complement: 207
- Armament: 8 × 120 mm (4.7 in) guns

Cristoforo Colombo was a screw corvette of the Italian Regia Marina (Royal Navy) built in the 1870s.

== Design ==
The design for Cristoforo Colombo was prepared by the noted naval engineer Benedetto Brin, and she was the first modern cruiser type vessel of the Italian fleet. Brin had originally intended to build a traditional sloop type cruising vessel, but a more powerful engine became available and Brin altered the design to accommodate it. The ship marked a significant advance over earlier Italian screw corvettes.

=== Characteristics ===
Cristoforo Colombo was 75.72 meters (248 ft 5 in) long between perpendiculars, and she had a beam of 11.3 m (37 ft 1 in) and an average draft of 5.25 m (17 ft 3 in). She displaced 2,325 long tons (2,362 t). The ship was of composite construction, with iron framing decks and wood hull planking. She was the last wooden-hulled cruiser of the Italian navy. The hull was divided into eight watertight compartments. She had a crew of 207.

Her propulsion system consisted of a single marine steam engine manufactured by John Penn and Sons; the engine drove a single screw propeller. Steam was supplied by six coal-fired fire-tube boilers that were vented into a pair of closely-spaced funnels placed amidships. Cristoforo Colombo could steam at a top speed of 16 knots (30 km/h; 18 mph) from 3,782 indicated horsepower (2,820 kW). She had a fuel capacity of 630 long tons (640 t) of coal, which enabled a cruising radius of 4,160 to 4,480 nautical miles (7,700 to 8,300 km; 4,790 to 5,160 mi) at a speed of 13 to 14 knots (24 to 26 km/h; 15 to 16 mph). To supplement the steam engines on extended voyages, she was fitted with a barquentine sailing rig. The foremast was square-rigged, while the main and mizzen masts were gaff-rigged.

The main battery for Cristoforo Colombo consisted of eight 120-millimeter (4.7 in) breech-loading guns, four guns per broadside. According to the Italian naval historian Aldo Fraccaroli, the ship probably had a 356 mm (14 in) torpedo tube installed later in the ship's career, though he provides no further details.

== Service history ==
The ship was laid down on 1 February 1873 in the Venice Naval Yard, and her completed hull was launched on 17 September 1875. Fitting out was completed by 16 November 1876. The ship went on a long-distance cruise in 1878, sailing as far as Australia and New Guinea. On 6 March 1879, she towed the Italian brig San Guiseppe in to Gibraltar. The brig had been severely damaged in a storm in the Atlantic Ocean on 19 February. In June 1880, Cristoforo Colombo visited Kiel, Germany, where she met the main German ironclad squadron.

The ship cruised in East Asian waters in the mid-1880s, departing from home waters in late 1883. She passed through Aden in early December and proceeded to Singapore, where she rendezvoused with the screw corvette Caracciolo, which had been cruising in Australian waters. The two ships then sailed north to China, where they patrolled the area to protect Italian nationals in the event of a conflict. On 5 April 1884, Cristoforo Colombo accidentally ran aground on the Quemoy Bank off Amoy in heavy fog, but her crew was able to free the ship at high tide. The vessel was not damaged in the accident. By July, Caracciolo had departed, though the corvette Vettor Pisani had been sent to join Cristoforo Colombo on the China station. At that time, tensions between China and France were high, and Italy and other foreign powers were concerned that the outbreak of a conflict between the two would threaten their nationals in China. Cristoforo Colombo was stationed in Shanghai, where her captain, Captain Accini, concluded agreements with the commanders of the United States gunboat USS Monocacy and the British corvette HMS Cleopatra to coordinate the defense of the city. Accini, as the most senior officer of the three, was placed in command of the proposed arrangement. At the start of the Sino-French War in August, both countries agreed to a limited area of hostilities, and Shanghai was in the neutral region, so the defense agreement was not put into effect.

Cristoforo Colombo was eventually discarded by the Regia Marina in 1891, though her ultimate fate is unknown. The following year, the ship was replaced by a steel-hulled vessel of the same name, which was also designed by Brin, and was in most respects identical to the original Cristoforo Colombo
