= Italian corvette Magenta =

Italian Regia Marina warship

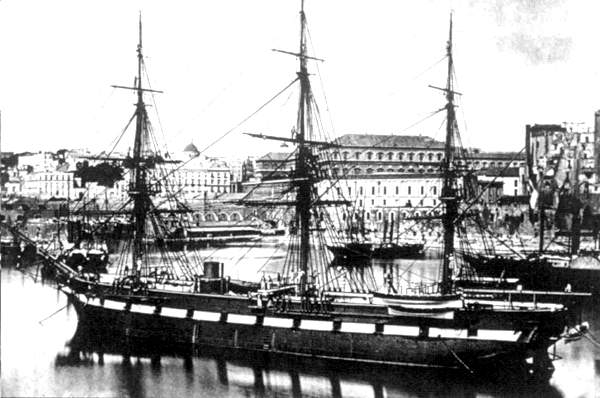
- Magenta in port

Class overview
- Name: Magenta
- Operators: Tuscan Navy; Regia Marina (Royal Navy)
- Preceded by: San Giovanni
- Succeeded by: Etna
- Completed: 1

History
- Laid down: 1859
- Launched: 18 July 1862
- Completed: 1863
- Fate: Broken up, 1875

General characteristics
- Type: Screw corvette
- Displacement: 2,669 long tons (2,712 t)
- Length: 67.1 m (220 ft 2 in) loa
- Beam: 12.9 m (42 ft 4 in)
- Draft: 5.9 m (19 ft 4 in)
- Installed power: 2 × fire-tube boilers; 1,900 ihp (1,400 kW)
- Propulsion: 1 × marine steam engine; 1 × screw propeller
- Speed: 10 knots (19 km/h; 12 mph)
- Complement: 308
- Armament: 2 × 200 mm (7.9 in) howitzers; 4 × 160 mm (6.3 in) rifled guns; 14 × 40-pound smoothbore guns

Magenta was a screw corvette, originally of the Tuscan Navy, which was later incorporated into the Italian Regia Marina during the unification of Italy. The ship was built in the late 1850s and early 1860s; by the time she was completed, Italy had unified and so she only served in the Regia Marina. She made a circumnavigation of the globe, which lasted from 1865 to 1868, making her the first Italian vessel to do so. The voyage included diplomatic missions to China and Japan, along with scientific explorations and surveys. She saw little service thereafter, and was laid up in 1875 and broken up that same year.

== Design ==
Magenta was 63.7 m (209 ft) long between perpendiculars and 67.1 m (220 ft 2 in) long overall, and a beam of 12.9 m (42 ft 4 in). She drew up to 5.9 m (19 ft 4 in). She had a displacement of 2,512 long tons (2,552 t) at normally and 2,669 long tons (2,712 t) at full load. Her hull was constructed with wood and sheathed with copper to protect the wood from marine biofouling. The ship had a crew of 308 officers and enlisted men.

The ship was propelled by a single marine steam engine that drove a screw propeller. Steam was provided by a pair of fire-tube boilers that were vented through a single funnel. The ship had a top speed of 10 knots (19 km/h; 12 mph) under steam, and the propulsion system was rated to produce 1,900 indicated horsepower (1,400 kW). She was fitted with a three-masted square rig to supplement the steam engine on long voyages overseas.

She was armed with a main battery of twenty guns. These consisted of four 160 mm (6.3 in) rifled guns, two 200 mm (7.9 in) howitzers, and fourteen 40-pounder smoothbore guns.

== Service history ==
The keel for Magenta was laid down in 1859 at the Medici Arsenal in Livorno for the Tuscan Navy. She was launched on 18 July 1862, by which time Tuscany had been absorbed into the newly created Kingdom of Italy. At her launching ceremony, the ship had to be lowered slowly into the water, as the narrow confines of the Vecchia Darsena, where she had been built, prevented a traditional slipway launching; to have done so would have allowed the unfinished ship to crash into the sea wall on the opposite side of the harbor. Instead, she had to be lowered by chains. The work lasted some six hours, and during the operation, one of the chains snapped and killed one of the shipyard workers and wounded several other men. Magenta was completed in 1863 and entered service with the Regia Marina (Royal Navy).

Magenta had been sent to South American waters by 1864. The Italian Navy, and the Royal Sardinian Navy before it, maintained a small squadron there to protect Italian commercial interests. The unit also included the paddle steamer Ercole and the gunboat Veloce. Magenta and Ercole were stationed in Río de la Plata, which forms the border of Argentina and Uruguay, while Ercole was stationed in Buenos Aires, Argentina. The screw frigate Principe Umberto was also in the region on a training cruise.

=== Circumnavigation ===
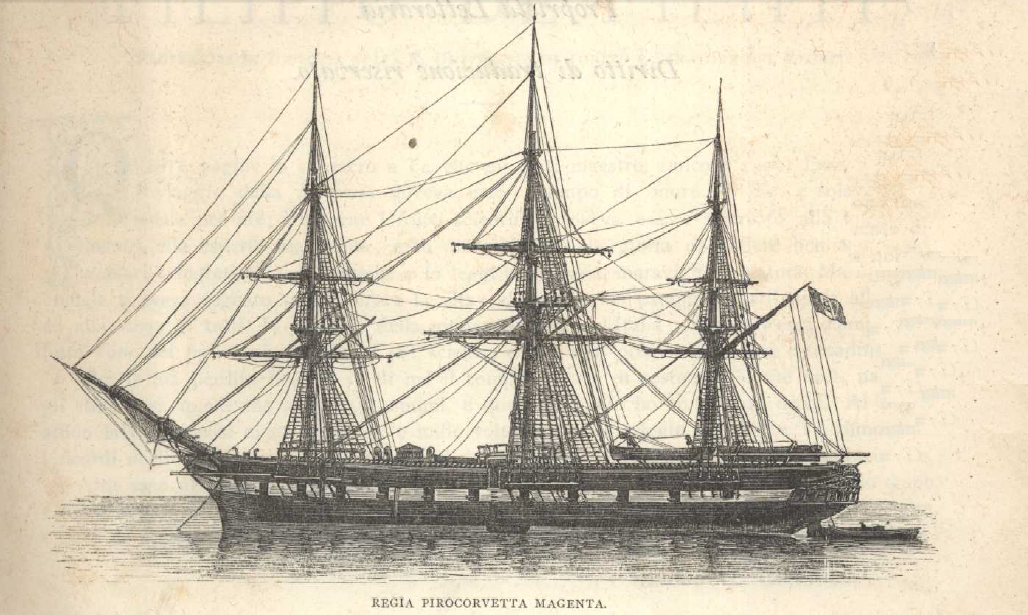
Sketch of Magenta

From 1865 to 1868, Magenta went on a major cruise around the world, under the command of Frigate Captain Vittorio Arminjon. Magenta was the first Italian ship to circumnavigate the globe. The ship carried several passengers during the voyage, including a diplomatic delegation that was to be the first Italian mission to Qing China; the group was meant to establish trading relations with China and Japan on the trip. The mission to Japan had particular importance, as the Italians sought to import silkworms to replace the previously imported worms that had been devastated by disease in the early 1860s. She also had several scientists aboard, among them the anthropologist and zoologist Enrico Hillyer Giglioli and the scientist Filippo De Filippi.

Because Magenta was already in South America, the diplomats and scientists traveled from Naples, Italy, aboard the steamers Regina and Ordita, departing on 8 November 1865 and arriving in Montevideo, Uruguay, on 5 January. Magenta met the vessels there to embark the group of scientists and diplomats. She then proceeded around the Cape of Good Hope in southern Africa. After passing through the Indian Ocean and entering the Pacific in 1866, Magenta made stops at the British colony of Singapore and then Saigon in French Cochinchina. The ship next sailed for Japan, arriving in Edo on 5 July. The ship remained in Japan for the next two months, and Arminjon and the diplomats met with representatives of the Japanese government. On 1 September, she departed Japan for Shanghai, China, and then later sailed north, entered the Yangtze River, and then anchored in the Bohai Sea. While in China, Arminjon signed the Treaty of Friendship and Commerce with the Qing government. While the ship was in Hong Kong, China, Filippi died. After departing China, Magenta was damaged in a typhoon and had to stop in Java in the Dutch East Indies for repairs that lasted a month.

By May 1867, Magenta had sailed to visit Australia and New Zealand, including a month-long stay in Sydney. During her period in Australian waters, she conducted an extensive survey of the island of Tasmania. She attempted to stop in Auckland, New Zealand, but contrary winds prevented her from entering the harbor. Instead, Magenta then continued across the south Pacific, bound for Lima, Peru. The ship sailed south for Valparaíso, Chile, on 23 August, arriving there a month later on 25 September. She then passed through the Straits of Magellan late in the year. While the ship cruised in South American waters, Giglioli made extensive observations of whales and dolphins. Magenta also carried out hydrographic surveys of the treacherous waters in the Straits of Magellan, which were not well documented at the time. The ship arrived back in Montevideo on 17 December. She sailed north to Buenos Aires, but was unable to dock there due to an outbreak of cholera in the city. On 2 January 1868, the ship got underway to return to Italy. She passed the Strait of Gibraltar on 15 September and anchored in Naples on 28 September, arriving to little public fanfare, which surprised Giglioli, who remarked that "it was as if the ship had come back from Cagliari."

In addition to the observations made by Giglioli and the other scientists and the hydrographic surveys conducted in South American waters, Magenta also brought back twenty-five boxes of valuable items for display in Italian museums. Giglioli later noted that Magenta carried too many guns for the expedition, which was intended to be a peaceful mission, and they took up space that could have been more useful to store additional maps and scientific instruments.

=== Later career ===
By October 1871, Magenta was based in Venice, along with several other smaller vessels, including the screw corvette San Giovanni. The Italian government sought to establish a penal colony on the island of Borneo in the Pacific in the early 1870s, and in 1872, a plan was formulated to send the vessels Cambria and Citta di Napoli with Magenta as an escort. Preparations were begun for the voyage, but British objections to the plan led to its cancellation, however. In 1873, the ship visited Tenedos in the Ottoman Empire. In 1875, the ship was laid up and thereafter broken up for scrap.
