= Italian corvette Cristoforo Colombo (1892) =

Screw corvette of the Italian Regia Marina

- Cristoforo Colombo in 1896

Class overview
- Name: Cristoforo Colombo
- Operators: Regia Marina (Royal Navy)
- Preceded by: Amerigo Vespucci
- Succeeded by: None
- Completed: 1

History
- Name: Cristoforo Colombo
- Builder: Venice Naval yard
- Laid down: 1 September 1890
- Launched: 24 September 1892
- Completed: 16 October 1894
- Fate: Discarded 10 March 1907

General characteristics
- Type: Screw corvette
- Displacement: Full load: 2,713 long tons (2,757 t)
- Length: 76.4 meters (251 ft) pp
- Beam: 11.3 m (37 ft)
- Draft: 5.69 m (18.7 ft)
- Installed power: 6 boilers; 2,321 ihp (1,731 kW)
- Propulsion: 1 shaft reciprocating
- Speed: 13 knots (24 km/h; 15 mph)
- Complement: 238
- Armament: 8 × 120 mm (4.7 in) guns; 2 × 75 mm (3 in) guns

Cristoforo Colombo was a steel-hulled corvette built in the early 1890s for the Italian Regia Marina (Royal Navy). The ship was built as a replacement for an earlier vessel of the same name, based on a nearly identical design. The new ship was intended to serve in Italy's colonial empire in eastern Africa, and was designed to be able to operate at long range, far from home ports, for an extended period of time.

The Regia Marina ultimately sold the ship in March 1907, though her ultimate fate is unknown.

== Design ==
In the late 1880s, the Italian Regia Marina's chief designer, Benedetto Brin, prepared the design for a new screw corvette to replace the earlier Cristoforo Colombo, which was by then more than a decade old. The new vessel is sometimes referred to as a reconstruction of the original vessel, but they were in fact distinct ships. That vessel's wooden hull had been superseded by newer steel-hulled ships like Flavio Gioia and Amerigo Vespucci that had been completed in the early 1880s. Brin's new design was an essential copy of the earlier vessel, though with a steel hull instead of the wooden one used in the old corvette. The Regia Marina intended to use the new ship as a colonial station ship in the Red Sea to help control Italian Eritrea. The new Cristoforo Colombo proved to be the final corvette of the Italian fleet; the navy thereafter turned to protected cruisers like Calabria for its colonial patrol duties.

=== Characteristics ===
Cristoforo Colombo was 76.4 meters (251 ft) long between perpendiculars, with a beam of 11.3 m (37 ft) and a draft of 5.69 m (18.7 ft). She displaced 2,713 long tons (2,757 t) at full load. Her steel hull was sheathed in copper to reduce biofouling, which was necessary for a ship intended to be stationed far from the level of maintenance facilities in home ports. Cristoforo Colombo had a crew of 238 officers and enlisted men.

The ship was powered with the same machinery used in the older Cristoforo Colombo, though it produced a lower speed. The engine was a 3-cylinder marine steam engine, which drove a single propeller shaft. Steam was provided by six boilers that were ducted into a pair of funnels. The propulsion system produced a top speed of 13 knots (24 km/h; 15 mph) from 2,321 indicated horsepower (1,731 kW), though the contemporary source The Naval Pocket-Book credits the ship with a top speed of 15 knots (28 km/h; 17 mph) from 3,780 ihp (2,820 kW). Coal storage capacity amounted to 445 long tons (452 t). To supplement the steam engine, particularly on long voyages to and from Italy's colonial empire, Cristoforo Colombo carried a barque sailing rig.

Cristoforo Colombo carried a relatively heavy gun battery for her small size, including eight 120-millimeter (4.7 in) 40-caliber guns. These were placed in single mounts in sponsons, four guns per broadside. Later in the ship's career, two of these guns were removed. For close-range defense against torpedo boats, she carried a secondary battery of two 75 mm (3 in) 24-caliber guns.

== Service history ==
The keel for Cristoforo Colombo was laid down on 1 September 1890, and her completed hull was launched on 24 September 1892. Fitting-out work was completed on 16 October 1894, after which the ship entered service with the Regia Marina. She had already been formally assigned to the 3rd Department, based in Venice, on 1 October 1893, though she did not actually join the unit until the following year. In 1895, the ship was assigned to the Training Squadron to serve as a training ship for naval cadets in company with the corvette Flavio Gioia. The ship was based in Venice at that time.

By 1901, Cristoforo Colombo was assigned to the Red Sea to patrol Italy's East African colony in Italian Somaliland, along with the gunboats Volturno and Provana and the training vessel Volta. She remained there the following year in company with Volturno. In 1903, the unit was renamed the Red Sea and Benadir Division, and was reinforced with the torpedo cruiser Caprera and the aviso Barbarigo. The following year, the unit consisted of Cristoforo Colombo, Volturno, the torpedo cruiser Coatit, and the aviso Galileo. The Regia Marina discarded the ship on 10 March 1907. Her ultimate fate is unknown.
