= Italian corvette San Giovanni =

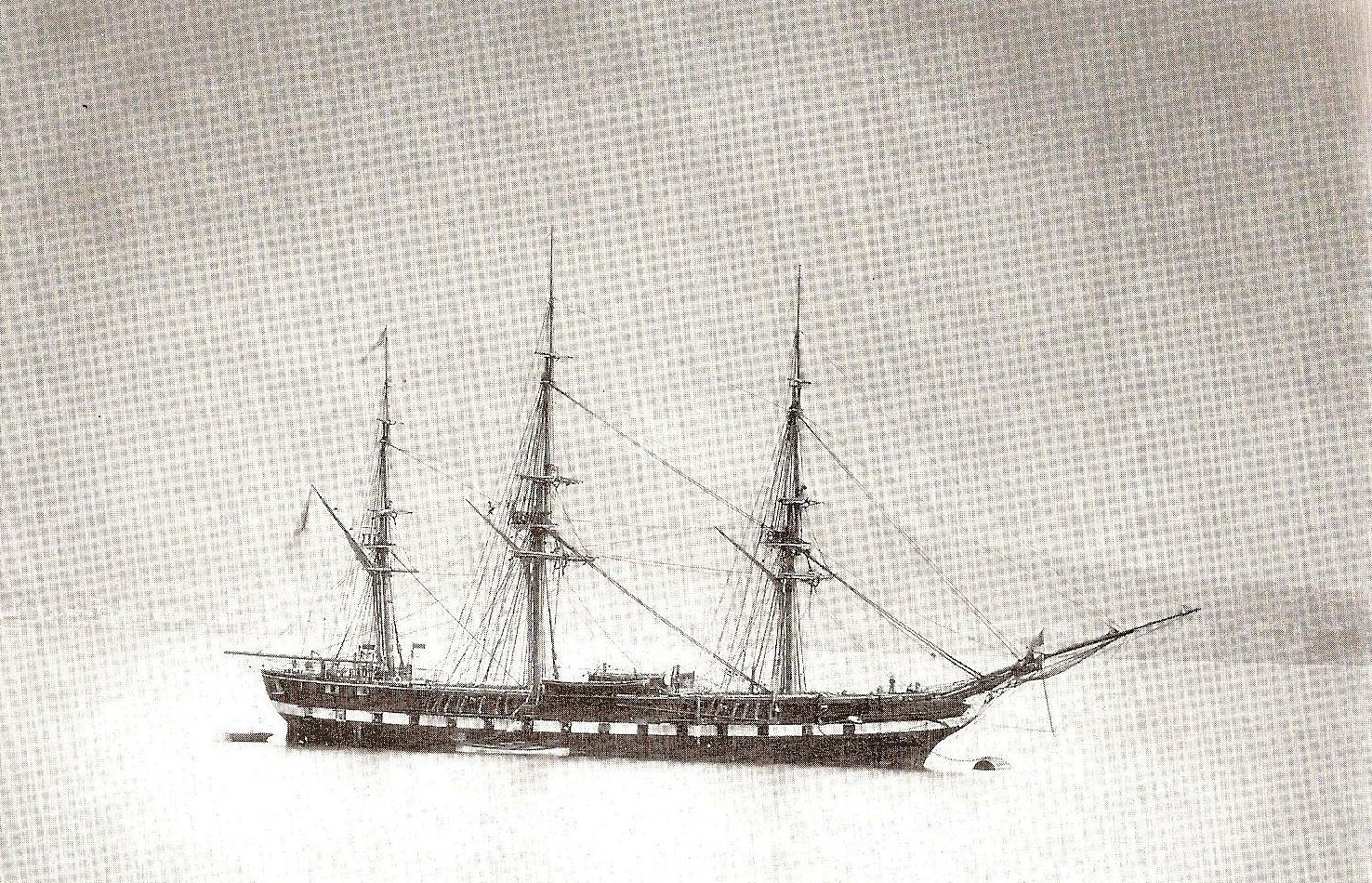
- San Giovanni

Class overview
- Name: San Giovanni
- Operators: Royal Sardinian Navy; Regia Marina (Royal Navy)
- Preceded by: None
- Succeeded by: Magenta
- Completed: 1

History
- Builder: Cantiere della Foce
- Laid down: 1848
- Launched: 1849
- Fate: Broken up, 1878

General characteristics
- Type: Corvette
- Displacement: 1,752 long tons (1,780 t)
- Length: 53 m (174 ft) loa
- Beam: 12.8 m (42 ft)
- Draft: 5.8 m (19 ft)
- Propulsion: Full ship rig
- Complement: 345
- Armament: 32 × guns

General characteristics (1862 refit)
- Type: Screw corvette
- Installed power: 1 × boiler; 220 metric horsepower (217 ihp)
- Propulsion: 1 × marine steam engine; 1 × screw propeller
- Speed: 9 knots (17 km/h; 10 mph)
- Range: 1,515 nautical miles (2,806 km; 1,743 mi) at 9 kn

San Giovanni was a sail corvette built for the Royal Sardinian Navy in the late 1840s. In 1861, she was converted into a screw corvette by which time the unification of Italy had been largely completed. As a result, she served with the Italian Regia Marina when the work on the ship was finished. She was present for the Battle of Lissa in 1866 during the Third Italian War of Independence, though she did not engage the Austrian Navy in the battle. She was eventually laid up in 1875 and broken up for scrap in 1878.

== Design ==
San Giovanni was 53 m (174 ft) long overall, with a beam of 12.8 m (42 ft) and a draft of 5.8 m (19 ft). She had a displacement of 1,752 long tons (1,780 t). Her wooden hull was sheathed with copper to protect it from shipworm and biofouling. The ship had a crew that varied over the course of her career from 326 to 345 officers and enlisted sailors.

She was fitted with a three masted full-ship rig. The ship was converted in 1861–1862 with a single marine steam engine that was supplied with a single boiler. It drove a screw propeller and was rated to produce a top speed of 9 knots (17 km/h; 10 mph), from 220 metric horsepower (217 ihp). The ship could carry up to 148 long tons (150 t), which enabled her to steam for 1,515 nautical miles (2,806 km; 1,743 mi) at 9 knots. As refitted with steam propulsion, she retained the sailing rig for auxiliary use.

The ship's armament varied over the course of her career. As completed, she was armed with a battery of twenty 16 cm (6.3 in) guns; fourteen of these were smoothbore guns in her broadside battery deck, eight guns per side. The remainder were rifled howitzers mounted on her upper deck. She carried four 8 cm (3.1 in) field guns that could be sent ashore with a landing party. A refit in 1870 saw her armament reduced to eight 16 cm smoothbore guns in the battery, though she retained the upper deck howitzers.

== Service history ==
The keel for San Giovanni was laid down in 1848 at the Cantiere della Foce shipyard in Genoa for the Royal Sardinian Navy. Her completed hull was launched the following year. In September 1850, San Giovanni sailed to Tunis in Ottoman Tunisia, arriving there on the 29th.

San Giovanni was sent to Toulon, France, to be converted into a screw-powered steam corvette. By the time she was launched in September 1861, the Italian states had unified as the Kingdom of Italy. Work on the ship continued into 1862.

=== Third Italian War of Independence ===
In June 1866, Italy declared war on Austria, as part of the Third Italian War of Independence, which was fought concurrently with the Austro-Prussian War. The Italian fleet commander, Admiral Carlo Pellion di Persano, initially adopted a cautious course of action; he was unwilling to risk battle with the Austrian Navy, despite the fact that the Austrian fleet was much weaker than his own. Persano claimed he was simply waiting on the ironclad ram Affondatore, en route from Britain, but his inaction weakened morale in the fleet, with many of his subordinates openly accusing him of cowardice.

Rear Admiral Wilhelm von Tegetthoff brought the Austrian fleet to Ancona on June 27, in attempt to draw out the Italians. At the time, many of the Italian ships were in disarray; many ships were experiencing various difficulties with their engines or armament. Persano held a council of war aboard the ironclad Principe di Carignano to determine whether he should sortie to engage Tegetthoff, but by that time, the Austrians had withdrawn, making the decision moot. The Minister of the Navy, Agostino Depretis, urged Persano to act and suggested the island of Lissa, to restore Italian confidence after their defeat at the Battle of Custoza the previous month. On 7 July, Persano took the fleet out of Ancona and conducted a sweep into the Adriatic, but encountered no Austrian ships and returned on the 13th.

San Giovanni took part in the Lissa campaign in July 1866 during the Third Italian War of Independence. There, she served in the Second Squadron under Admiral Giovan Battista Albini. Albini was responsible for transporting and landing the Italian army forces that were to seize the island of Lissa though he failed to follow his orders. After the initial attack, Albini held a council of war aboard his flagship that determined further attempts to land troops on the island would be unsuccessful and would only incur further damage to his ships. He sent San Giovanni to inform Persano of his decision to cancel further landing attempts. In the Battle of Lissa that followed the abortive landing operation, Albini failed to support the ironclad fleet under Persano, and as a result, San Giovanni saw no action during the battle. Albini was sacked after the battle for his timidity and failure to follow orders.

Later in the 1860s, San Giovanni was used as a stationary training ship for ship's boys. The navy requested funds to make repairs to the vessel in 1870, but the work was not done at that time. As of October 1871, she was stationed in Venice along with a number of other cruising vessels, including the screw corvette Magenta. Repairs had still not been carried out by 1874, and her condition had deteriorated to the point that it was no longer considered worthwhile to repair her. The ship was laid up in 1875, and by 1878, the Regia Marina had broken her up for scrap.
