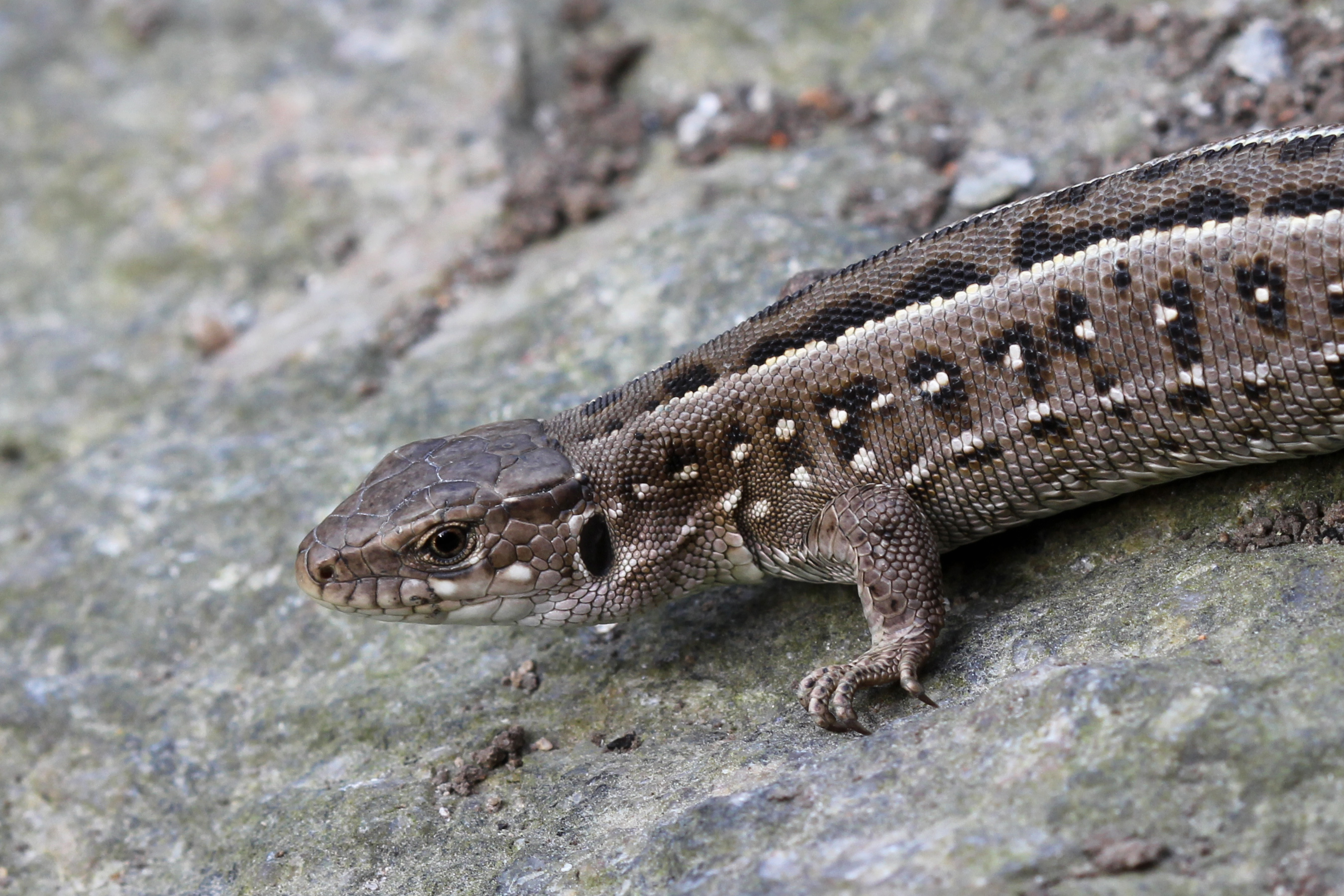
- Sand lizard (Lacerta agilis)

Scientific classification
- Kingdom: Animalia
- Phylum: Chordata
- Class: Reptilia
- Order: Squamata
- Family: Lacertidae
- Tribe: Lacertini
- Genus: Lacerta; Linnaeus, 1758

Type species
- Lacerta agilis Linnaeus, 1758

Species
- Ten, see text.
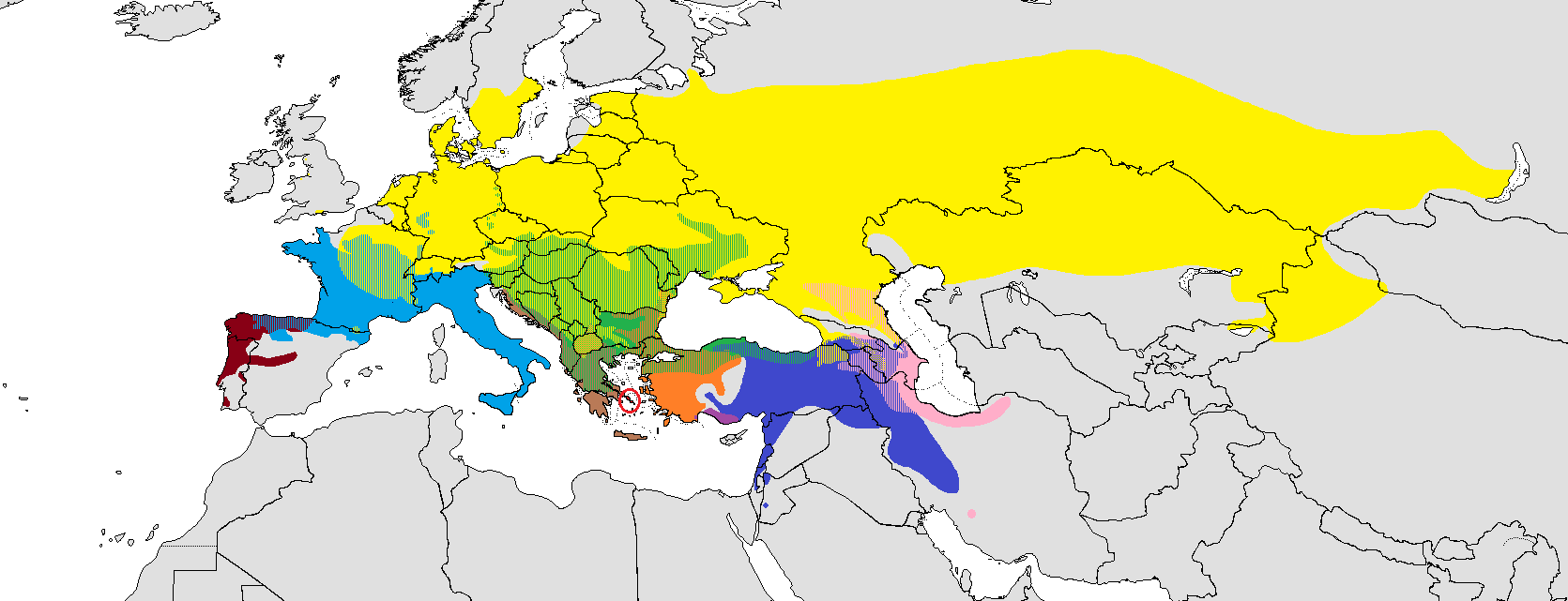
- Modern range of Lacerta species: L. agilis L. bilineata L. citrovittata L. diplochondrodes L. media L. pamphylica L. schreiberi L. strigata L. trilineata L. viridis

= Lacerta (genus) =

Lacerta Temporal range: Miocene—Present, 15–0 Ma

Genus of lizards

Lacerta is a genus of lizards of the family Lacertidae.

== Taxonomy ==
Lacerta was a fairly diverse genus containing around 40 species, until it was split into nine genera in 2007 by Arnold, Arribas & Carranza.

== Fossil record ==
The earliest known members of the genus Lacerta are known from early Miocene epoch fossils indistinguishable in anatomy from the modern green lizards such as Lacerta viridis. Some fossil species from the ice-age mediterranean, such as Lacerta siculimelitensis, reached especially large sizes.

== Species ==
The genus Lacerta contains the following species.

Image	Name	Distribution
	Lacerta agilis – sand lizard	
	Lacerta bilineata – western green lizard	
	Lacerta citrovittata – Tinos green lizard	Greece
	Lacerta diplochondrodes – Rhodos green lizard	Greece
	Lacerta media	Georgia, Armenia, Azerbaijan, Iran, Turkey, Israel, Jordan, Syria, Lebanon and Russia
	Lacerta pamphylica	Turkey
	Lacerta schreiberi – Iberian emerald lizard	
	Lacerta strigata – Caucasus emerald lizard	Georgia, Armenia, Azerbaijan, Turkmenistan, Turkey and Iran
	Lacerta trilineata – Balkan green lizard	
	Lacerta viridis – European green lizard	

== Some species formerly in Lacerta ==
Arranged alphabetically by specific name:

- Anatololacerta anatolica – Anatolian rock lizard
- Atlantolacerta andreanskyi – Atlas dwarf lizard, Andreansky's lizard
- Iberolacerta aranica – Aran rock lizard
- Iberolacerta aurelioi – Aurelio's rock lizard
- Archaeolacerta bedriagae – Bedriaga's rock lizard
- Iberolacerta bonnali – Pyrenean rock lizard
- Apathya cappadocica – Anatolian lizard
- Darevskia chlorogaster – Green-bellied lizard
- Phoenicolacerta cyanisparsa
- Omanosaura cyanura – blue-tailed Oman lizard
- Anatololacerta danfordi – Danford's lizard
- Darevskia defilippii – Elburs lizard
- Darevskia dryada (Darevsky & Tuniyev, 1997)
- Teira dugesii – Madeiran wall lizard
- Geosaurus giganteus
- Hellenolacerta graeca – Greek rock lizard
- Iberolacerta horvathi – Horvath's rock lizard
- Omanosaura jayakari – Jayakar's lizard
- Phoenicolacerta kulzeri
- Phoenicolacerta laevis – Lebanon lizard
- Timon lepidus – ocellated lizard, foot lizard
- Iberolacerta monticola – Iberian rock lizard
- Dinarolacerta mosorensis - Mosor rock lizard
- Podarcis muralis – common wall lizard
- Anatololacerta oertzeni
- Dalmatolacerta oxycephala – sharp-snouted rock lizard
- Parvilacerta parva – dwarf lizard
- Darevskia steineri
- Zootoca vivipara – viviparous lizard
- Iranolacerta zagrosica
