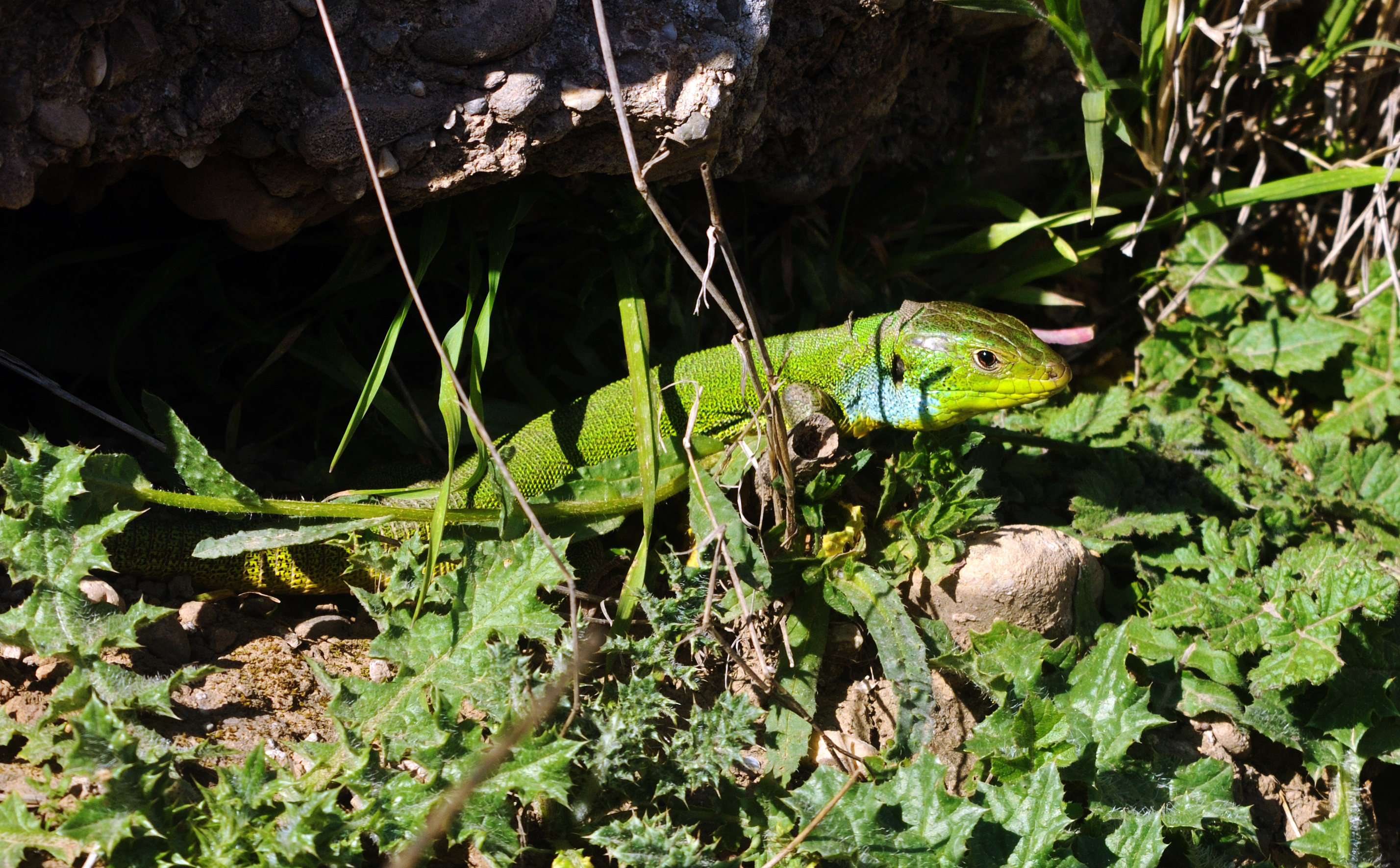

Conservation status
- Least Concern (IUCN 3.1)

Scientific classification
- Kingdom: Animalia
- Phylum: Chordata
- Class: Reptilia
- Order: Squamata
- Family: Lacertidae
- Genus: Lacerta
- Species: L. media

Binomial name
- Lacerta media Lantz & Cyrén, 1920

= Lacerta media =

Species of lizard

Lacerta media, the medium lizard, three-lined lizard, Caucasian green lizard or Levant green lizard is a species of lizard in the family Lacertidae, the family which includes the so call "true" lizards and wall lizards. This lizard has a wide distribution in southwestern Asia.

== Taxonomy ==
Lacerta media was first formally described as a subspecies of the European green lizard, Lacerta viridis media in 1920 by the French herpetologist Amédée Louis Lantz and the Swedish chemical engineer and amateur zoologist Otto Cyrén. The lectotype was designated in 2019 by I.V. Doronin and M.A. Doronina, the type locality is Samtskhe–Javakheti, Borjomi, Kvabishevi river valley in Georgia. It was Cyrén who first used the binomial Lacerta media in 1933.

=== Subspecies ===
Lacerta media has been classified into the following subspecies:

- Lacerta media media Lantz & Cyrén, 1920 - southern Russia Geirgia, Armenia, Azerbaijan and Iran;
- Lacerta media ciliciensis Schmidtler, 1975 - southeastern Turkey;
- Lacerta media isaurica Schmidtler, 1975 - south central Turkey;
- Lacerta media israelica Peters, 1964 - Syria, Israel and Jordan;
- Lacerta media wolterstorffi Mertens, 1922 - extreme southeatsren Turkey, Lebanon, the Golan Heights in Syria.

== Description ==
Lacerta media reaches a snout to vent length of 12 to 14 cm (4.7 to 5.5 in). The top of the head is greenish or brownish, the rest of the upper surface of adult males is entirely green, while females have pale longitudinal stripes. The tail is long, and the posterior end may be brownish. Both sexes have blue spots on the sides of the neck; in males, these spots are also found on the sides and at the base of the tail.

== Distribution and habitat ==
Lacerta media occurs in southwester Asia from southern central Turkey east to Iran, north to southern Russia and south to northern Israel. It is found from sea level to over 2,000 m (6,600 ft) above sea level in Armenia. It typically inhabits herbaceous, shrubby, or sparsely wooded habitats. It may be found sympatrically with L. strigata, a species which prefers grassy habitats, including dry meadows, while shrubby terrain and pine forests are more important for L. media. Overall, this species inhabits more diverse habitats than L. strigata. Remarkably, the medium lizard also occurs uncommonly on the Black Sea coast, in dune areas overgrown with box trees near the beach.
