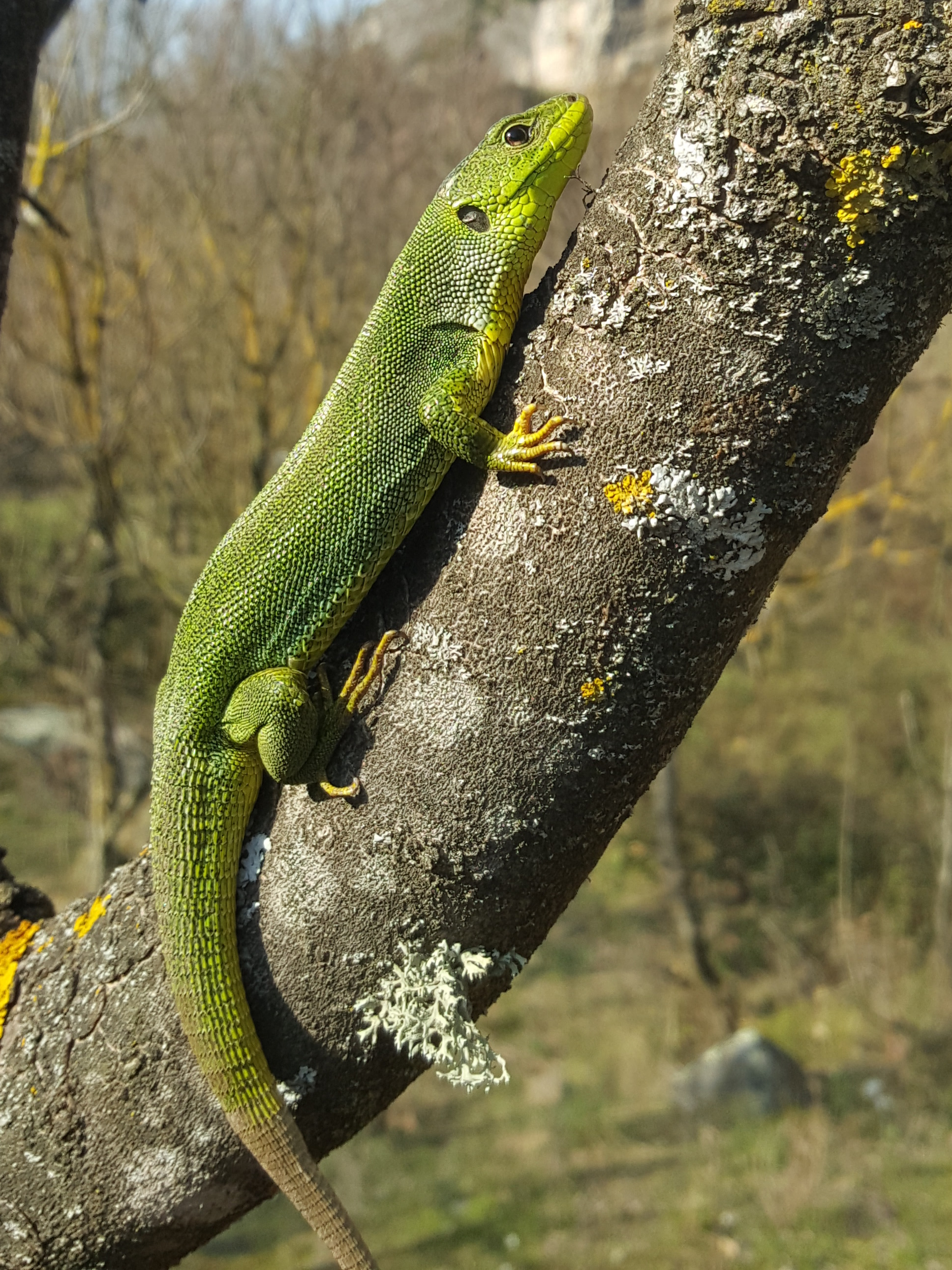

Scientific classification
- Kingdom: Animalia
- Phylum: Chordata
- Class: Reptilia
- Order: Squamata
- Family: Lacertidae
- Genus: Lacerta
- Species: L. diplochondrodes

Binomial name
- Lacerta diplochondrodes Wettstein, 1952

Synonyms
- Lacerta trilineata diplochondrodes

= Lacerta diplochondrodes =

Species of lizard

Lacerta diplochondrodes, the Rhodos green lizard, is a species of lizard in the family Lacertidae. It is found in Greece, Romania, Bulgaria and Turkey.
