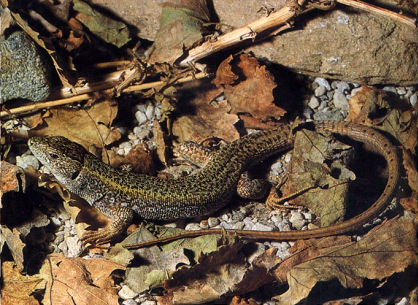

Conservation status
- Least Concern (IUCN 3.1)

Scientific classification
- Kingdom: Animalia
- Phylum: Chordata
- Class: Reptilia
- Order: Squamata
- Suborder: Lacertoidea
- Family: Lacertidae
- Genus: Lacerta
- Species: L. trilineata

Binomial name
- Lacerta trilineata Bedriaga, 1886
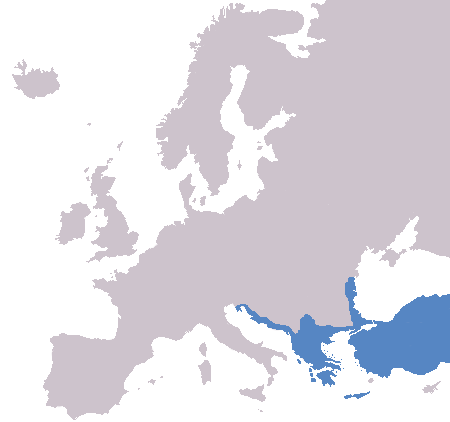

= Balkan green lizard =

Species of lizard

The Balkan green lizard (Lacerta trilineata) is a species of lizard in the family Lacertidae. It is the most widespread of the Balkans lizard species. It is found in Albania, Kosovo, Bosnia and Herzegovina, Bulgaria, Croatia, Greece, Montenegro, North Macedonia, Romania, Serbia, Palestine, Syria, and Turkey. Its natural habitats are Mediterranean-type shrubby vegetation, sandy shores, arable land, pastureland, plantations, and rural gardens. It is threatened by habitat loss.

== Reproduction ==
Males and females from Greece have a reproductive cycle that begins in April and ends in July. Both sexes achieve sexual maturity when they reach approximately 80 millimeters in body size.
