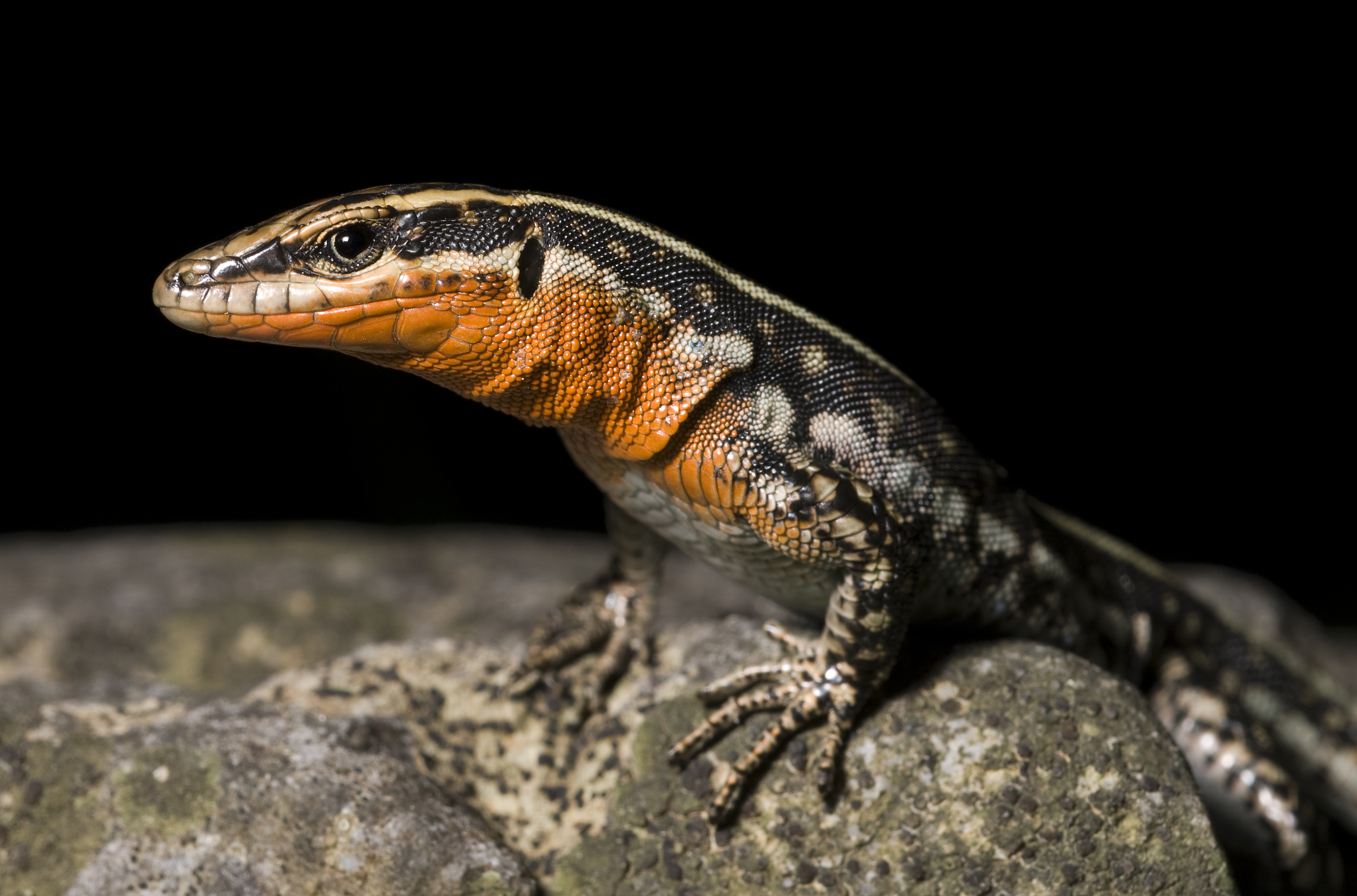
- Anatololacerta anatolica

Scientific classification
- Kingdom: Animalia
- Phylum: Chordata
- Class: Reptilia
- Order: Squamata
- Family: Lacertidae
- Genus: Anatololacerta; Arnold, Arribas & Carranza, 2007

Species
- Six, see text.

= Anatololacerta =

Genus of lizards

Anatololacerta is a genus of lizards in the subfamily Lacertinae of the family Lacertidae.

== Species ==
- Anatololacerta anatolica (F. Werner, 1900) – Anatolian rock lizard
- Anatololacerta danfordi (Günther, 1876) – Danford's lizard
- Anatololacerta finikensis (Eiselt & Schmidtler, 1987)
- Anatololacerta ibrahimi (Eiselt & Schmidtler, 1986)
- Anatololacerta oertzeni (F. Werner, 1904)
- Anatololacerta pelasgiana (Mertens, 1959)

Nota bene: A binomial authority in parentheses indicates that the species was originally described in a genus other than Anatololacerta.
