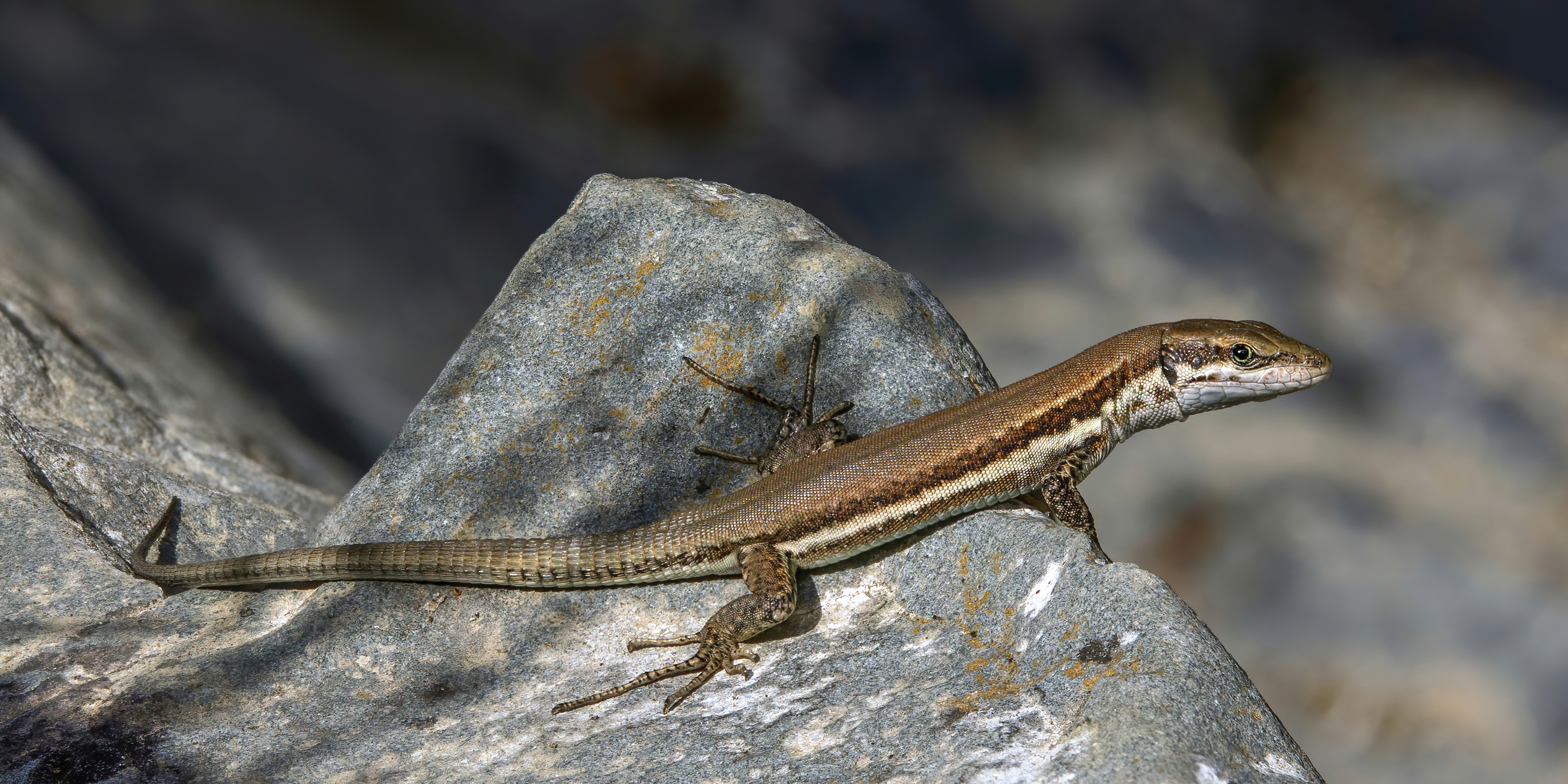

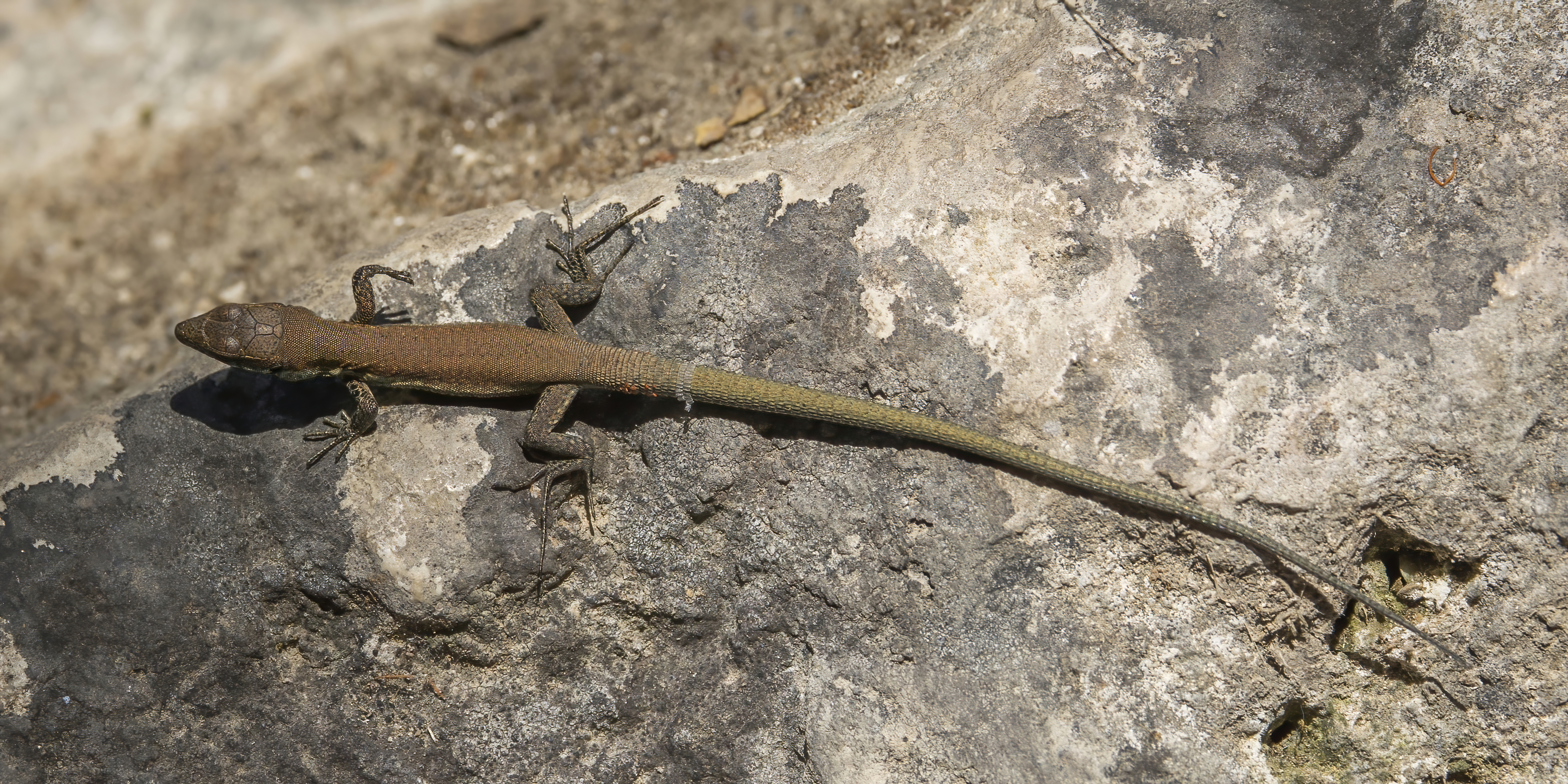

Conservation status
- Least Concern (IUCN 3.1)

Scientific classification
- Kingdom: Animalia
- Phylum: Chordata
- Class: Reptilia
- Order: Squamata
- Family: Lacertidae
- Genus: Phoenicolacerta
- Species: P. troodica

Binomial name
- Phoenicolacerta troodica (Werner, 1936)

Synonyms
- Lacerta laevis troodica Werner 1936

= Phoenicolacerta troodica =

Species of lizard

Phoenicolacerta troodica, commonly known as the Troodos wall lizard, Troodos rock lizard, Troodos lizard, Cyprus lizard or Cyprus wall lizard is a species of lizard belonging to the family Lacertidae. This lizard is endemic to Cyprus.

== Taxonomy ==
Phoenicolacerta troodica was first formally described as Lacerta laevis troodica in 1936 by the Austrian herpetologist Franz Werner with its type locality given as Platraes. The Cyprus lizard is now classified as a valid species within the genus Phoenicolacerta which belongs to the family Lacertidae, the African and Eurasian "typical lizards".

== Etymology ==
Phoenicolacerta troodica is classified within the genus Phoenicolacerta, a name which prefixes the Latin word, Phoenice, meaning "Phoenicia", the coast of the Levant, where most of the species of these lizards are found, with lacerta, "a lizard". The specific name refers to the type locality being in the Troodos Mountains of Cyprus.

== Description ==
Phoenicolacerta troodica is a small lizard with a maximum length of 15 cm (5.9 in), although 10 cm (3.9 in) is more typical. The overall colour is brownish green to greyish green with a broad, longitudinal dark brown stripe running along the sides from the snout to the tail, with a white line along the lower margin of this stripe, separating it from the pale underside. In the breeding season the males develop orange blotches on the sides of the head and their underside also changes to orange with blue and red spots along the flanks.

== Distribution and habitat ==
Phoenicolacerta troodica is endemic to Cyprus where it is found all over the island from sea level to 1,600 m (5,200 ft) above sea level in a wide variety of habitats, with the availability of shade being the most important requirement.
