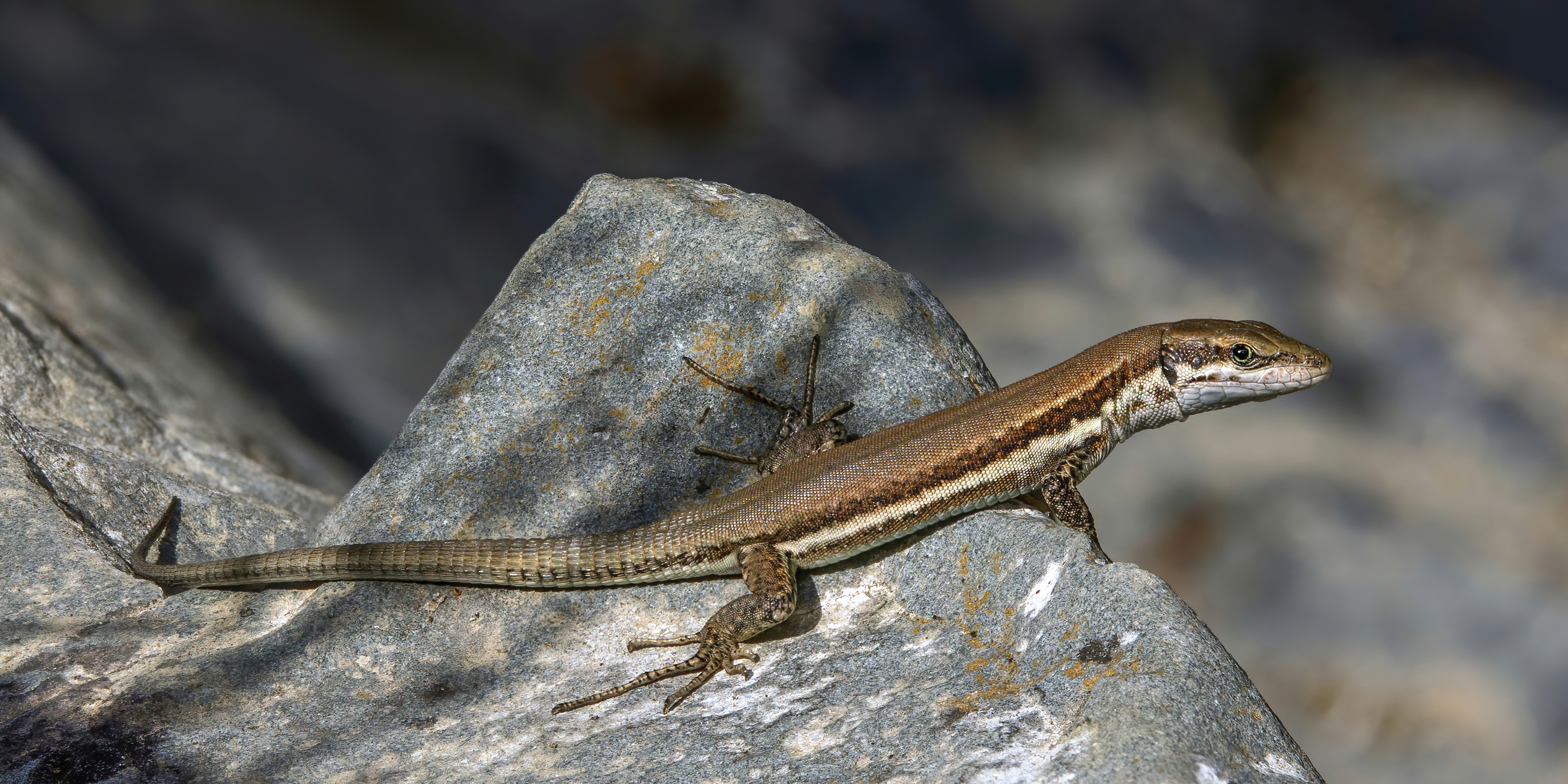
- Troodos lizard Phoenicolacerta troodica

Scientific classification
- Kingdom: Animalia
- Phylum: Chordata
- Class: Reptilia
- Order: Squamata
- Family: Lacertidae
- Genus: Phoenicolacerta; Arnold, Arribas & Carranza, 2007

Species
- Four, see text.

= Phoenicolacerta =

Genus of lizards

Phoenicolacerta is a genus of wall lizards of the family Lacertidae. The genus was described in 2007.

== Species ==
- Phoenicolacerta cyanisparsa (J.F. Schmidtler & Bischoff, 1999)
- Phoenicolacerta kulzeri (L. Müller & Wettstein, 1933)
- Phoenicolacerta laevis (Gray, 1838)
- Phoenicolacerta troodica (F. Werner, 1936)

Nota bene: A binomial authority in parentheses indicates that the species was originally described in a genus other than Phoenicolacerta.
