= Lacerta pamphylica =

Conservation status
- Least Concern (IUCN 3.1)

Scientific classification
- Kingdom: Animalia
- Phylum: Chordata
- Class: Reptilia
- Order: Squamata
- Suborder: Lacertoidea
- Family: Lacertidae
- Genus: Lacerta
- Species: L. pamphylica

Binomial name
- Lacerta pamphylica Schmidtler, 1975

Species of lizard

Lacerta pamphylica is a species of lizard in the family Lacertidae. It is endemic to Turkey.
