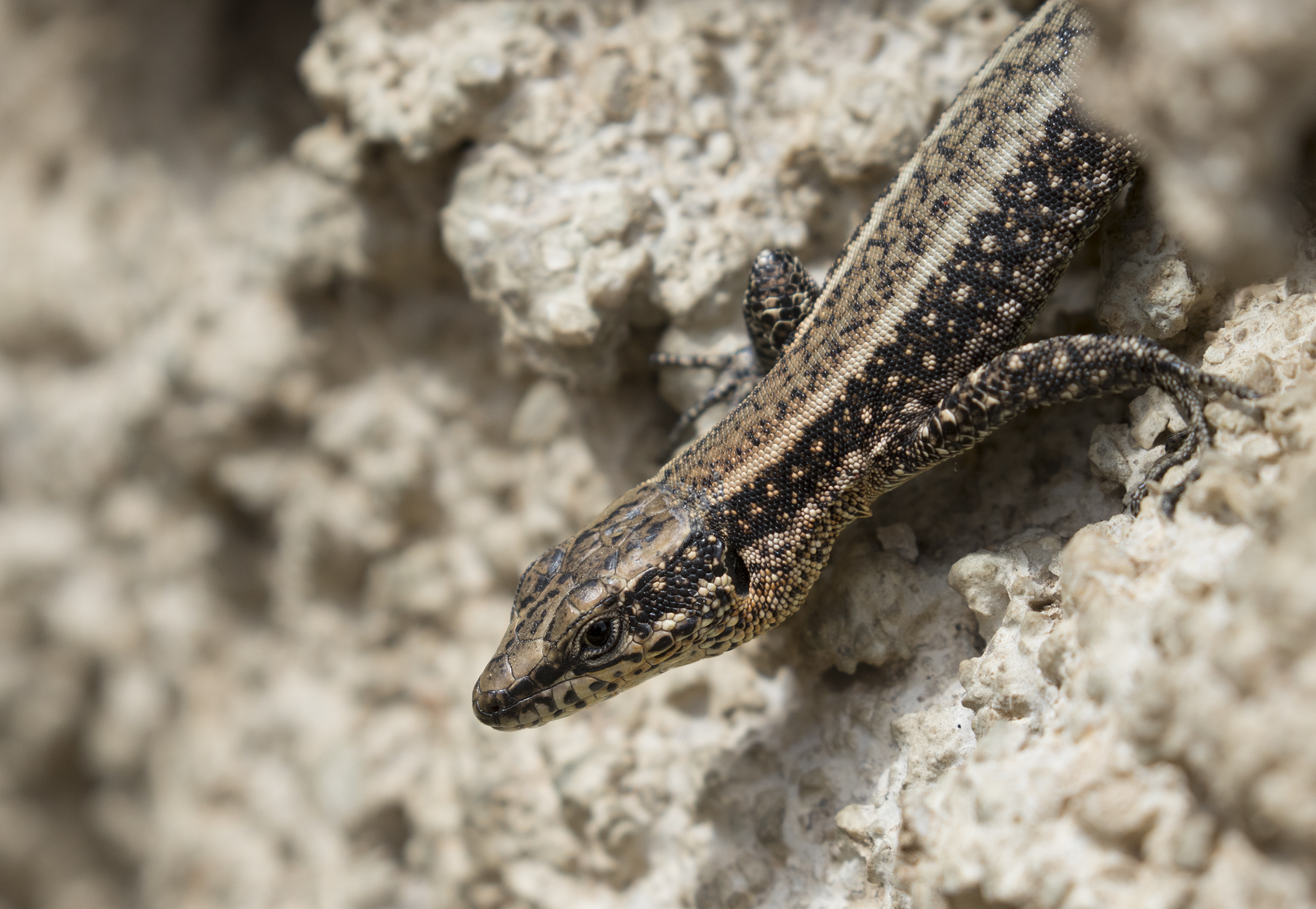

Conservation status
- Least Concern (IUCN 3.1)

Scientific classification
- Kingdom: Animalia
- Phylum: Chordata
- Class: Reptilia
- Order: Squamata
- Suborder: Lacertoidea
- Family: Lacertidae
- Genus: Anatololacerta
- Species: A. pelasgiana

Binomial name
- Anatololacerta pelasgiana (Mertens, 1959)

= Anatololacerta pelasgiana =

Pelasgian rock lizard

Species of lizard

The Pelasgian rock lizard (Anatololacerta pelasgiana) is a species of lizard found in Turkey and Greece.
