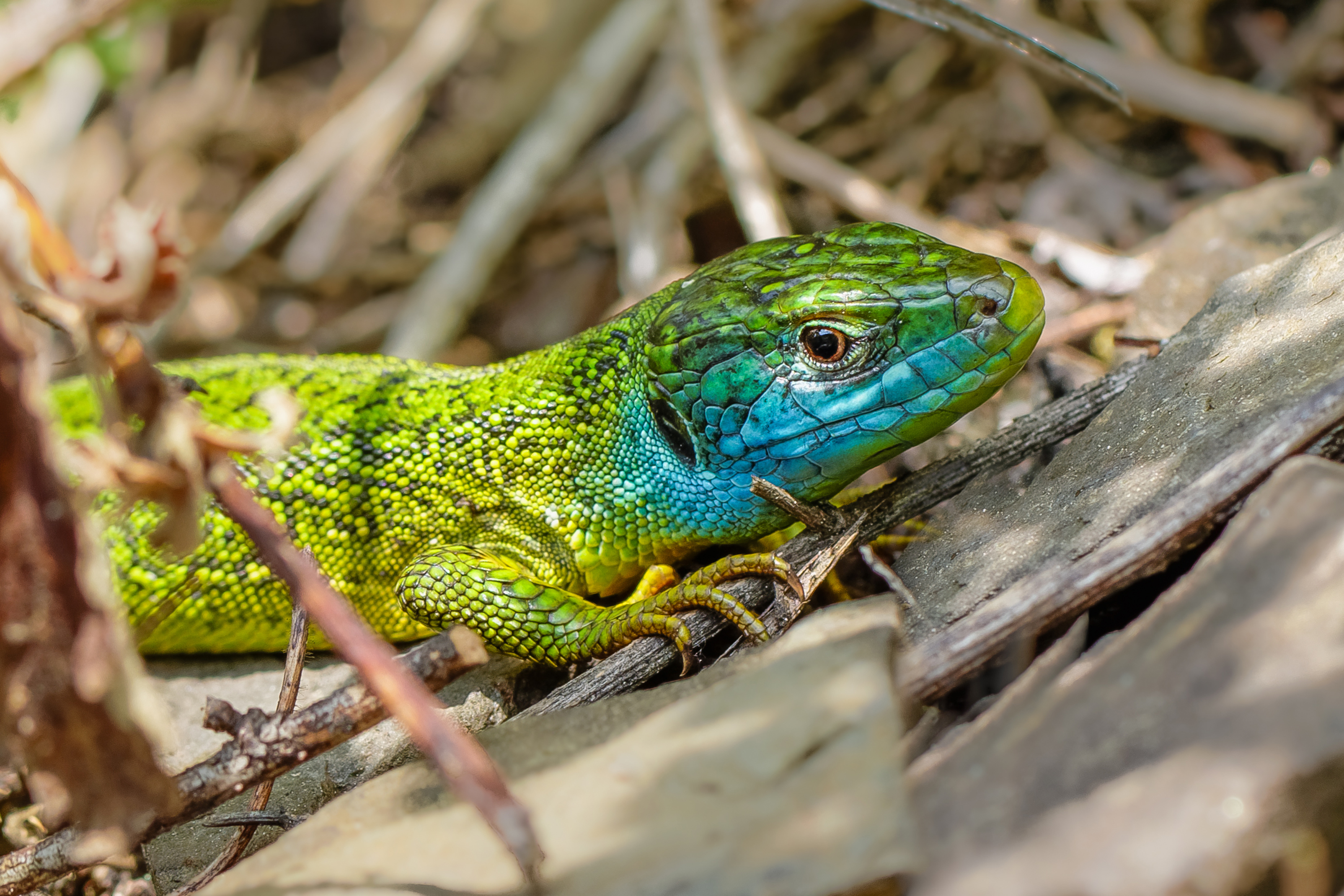
- Male
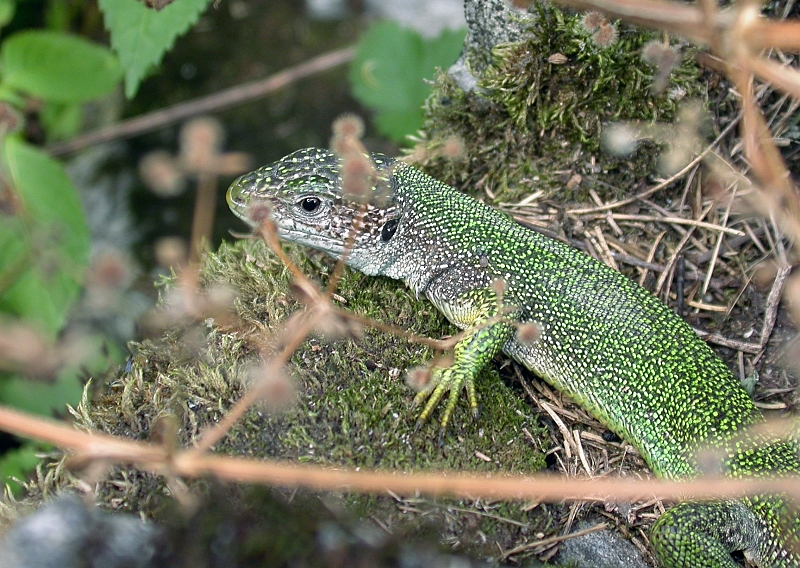
- Female

Conservation status
- Least Concern (IUCN 3.1)

Scientific classification
- Kingdom: Animalia
- Phylum: Chordata
- Class: Reptilia
- Order: Squamata
- Family: Lacertidae
- Genus: Lacerta
- Species: L. bilineata

Binomial name
- Lacerta bilineata Daudin, 1802
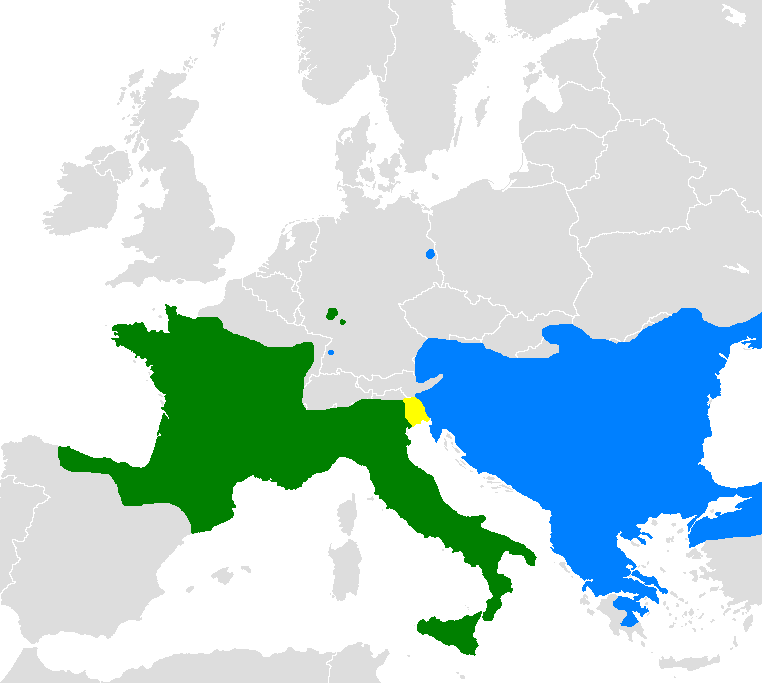
- The western green lizard is in green The eastern green lizard is in blue

Synonyms
- Lacerta viridis bilineata Engelmann et al., 1993

= Western green lizard =

Species of lizard

The western green lizard (Lacerta bilineata) is a lizard of the family Lacertidae.

== Etymology ==
The genus name Lacerta and the species name bilineata are Latin words respectively meaning "lizard" and "with two lines", with reference to the pale lines present on the flanks of the young individuals.

== Subspecies ==
- Lacerta bilineata bilineata Daudin, 1802 (in Spain, France, Switzerland and Germany)
- Lacerta bilineata chloronota Rafinesque-Schmaltz, 1810 (in southern Italy and Sicily)
- Lacerta bilineata chlorosecunda Taddei, 1950 (in southeastern Italy)
- Lacerta bilineata fejervaryi Vasvary, 1926 (in Italy from Tuscany up to Naples)

== Distribution ==
It is native in Andorra, Croatia, France, Germany, Italy, Monaco, Serbia, Slovenia, Spain, Switzerland, Guernsey and Jersey in the Channel Isles. and introduced into the United States. There are also introduced colonies on the south coast of the U.K, notably around Poole Bay in Dorset.

== Description ==
Lacerta bilineata reaches an average length (excluding tail) of about 13 centimetres (5.1 in), with a maximum of 40 centimetres (16 in), including tail. The tail may reach up to twice the body length. The average weight is about 35 grams. The body is bright green. The head is bigger in males than in females, and the males often show a blue throat. Juveniles are almost brown, with a yellowish belly and two to four pale, longitudinal lines along the flanks. Sub-adults also have these lines, together with several small brown spots on their backs.

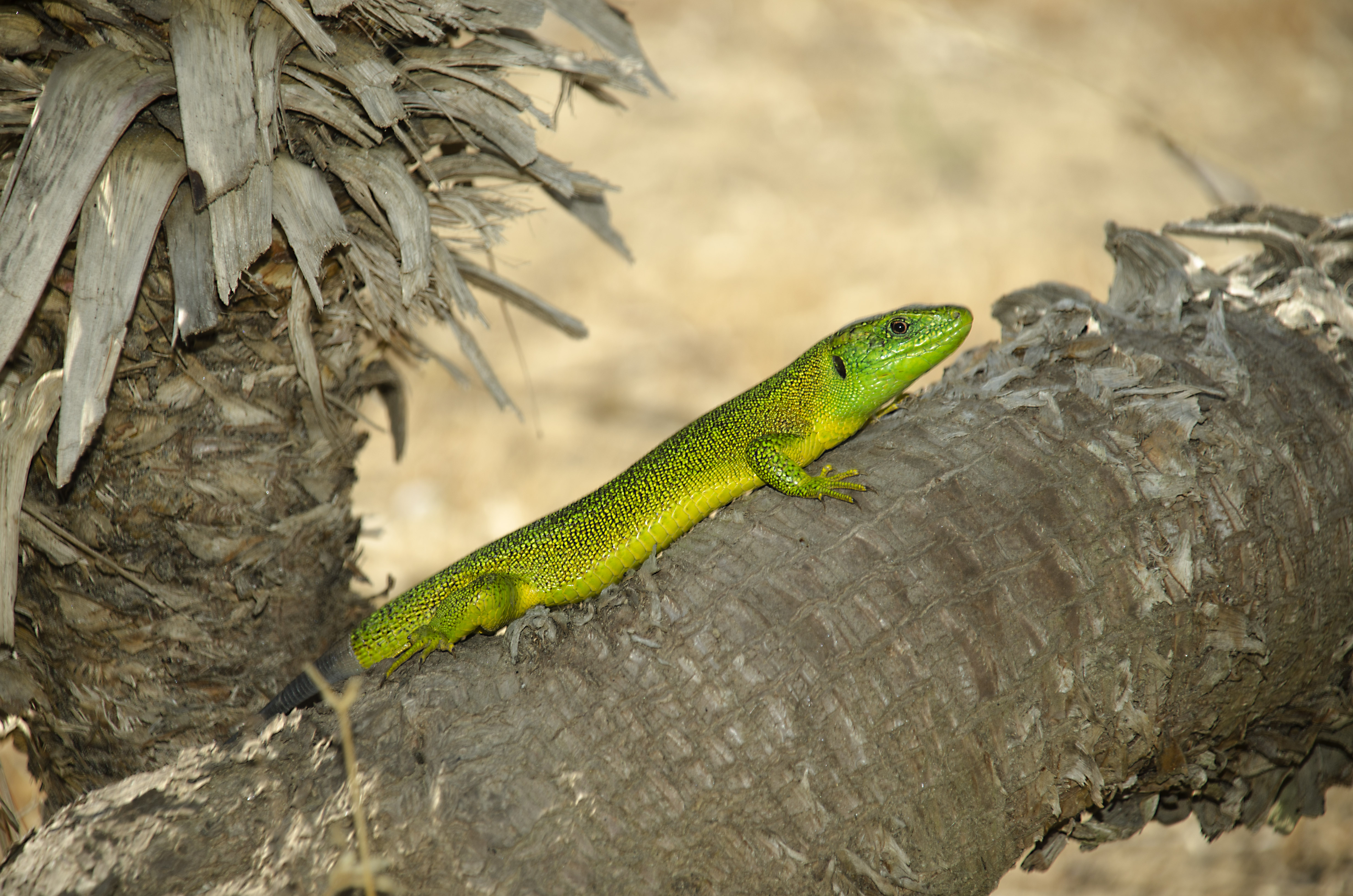
Male of Lacerta bilineata

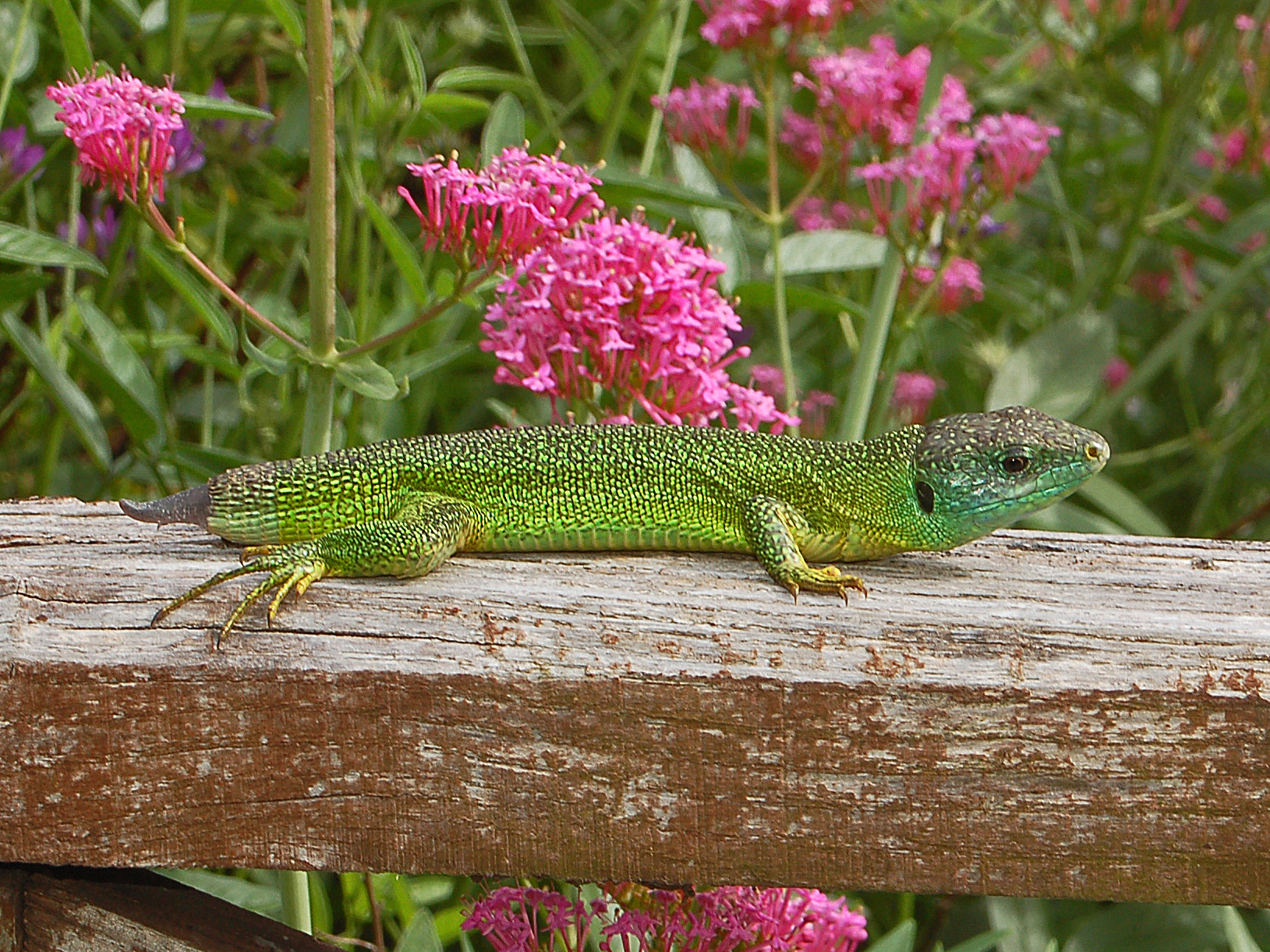
Lacerta bilineata regenerating its previously shed tail (autotomy)

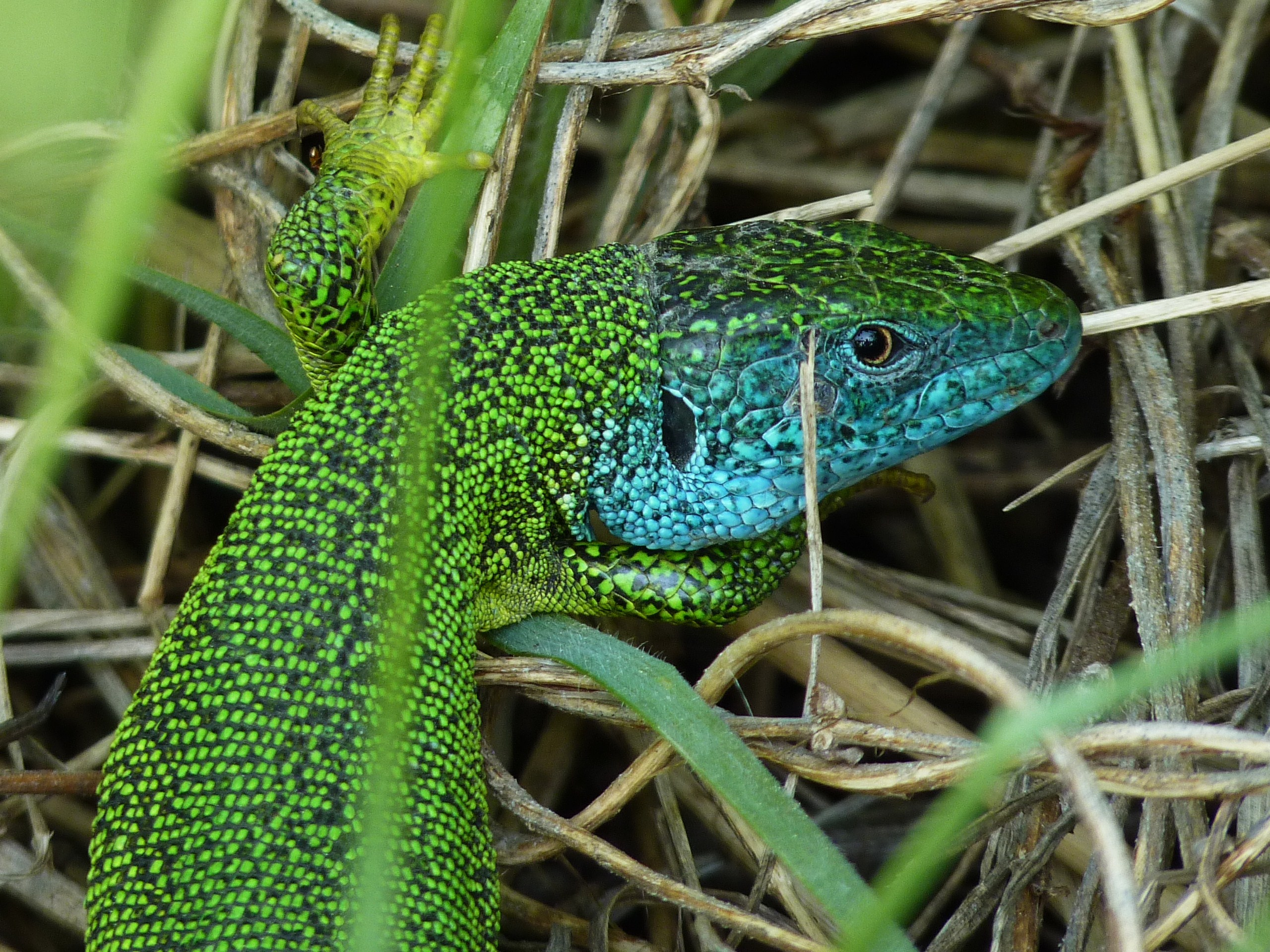
Close-up

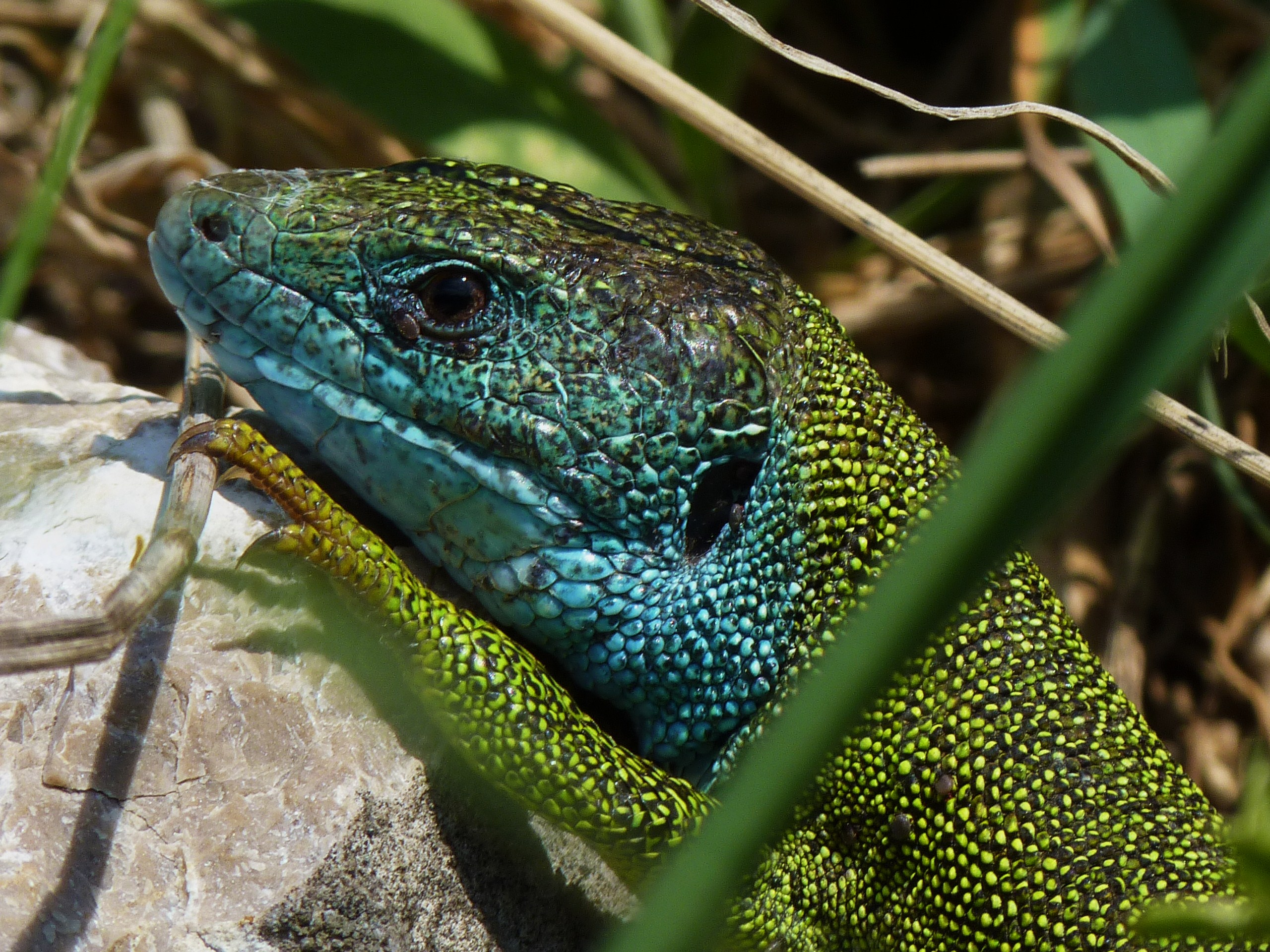
Close-up

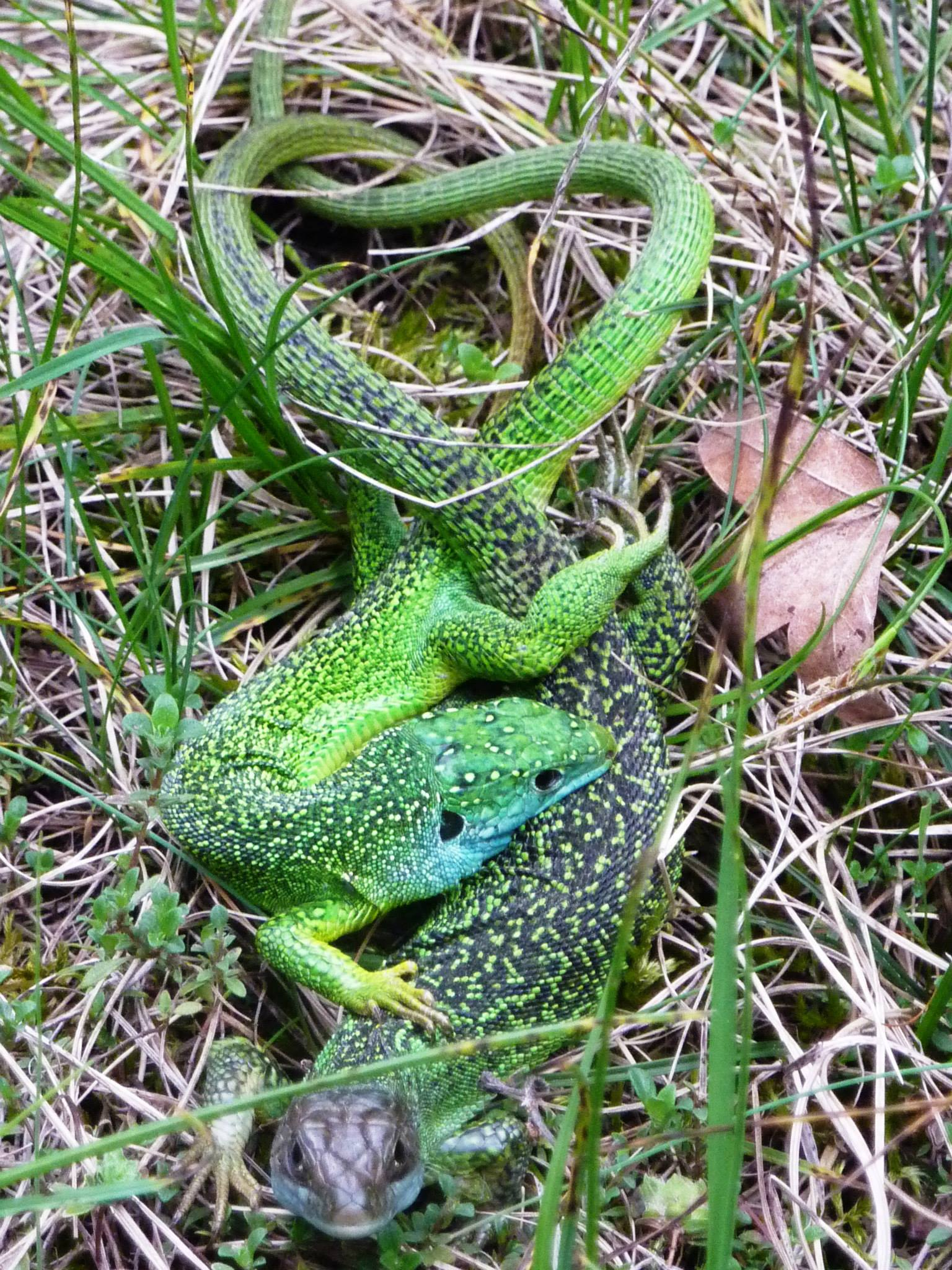
Coupling

These lizards are territorial animals. They attain sexual maturity at around two years, when they are about 8 cm long (excluding tail). The males fight each other, especially during the mating period, when they are very aggressive towards rivals. The mating ritual is precise, and starts with a bite to the base of the female's tail. The females lay 6 to 25 eggs in a humid and warm site, such as in a decomposing log. The average life span of this species is about 15 years.

They feed on arthropods, like large insects, isopods and spiders.

== Habitat ==
Its natural habitats are green humid areas, temperate forest, the edges of woods, shrubland, open grassland, arable land, and pastureland. It is threatened by habitat loss.
