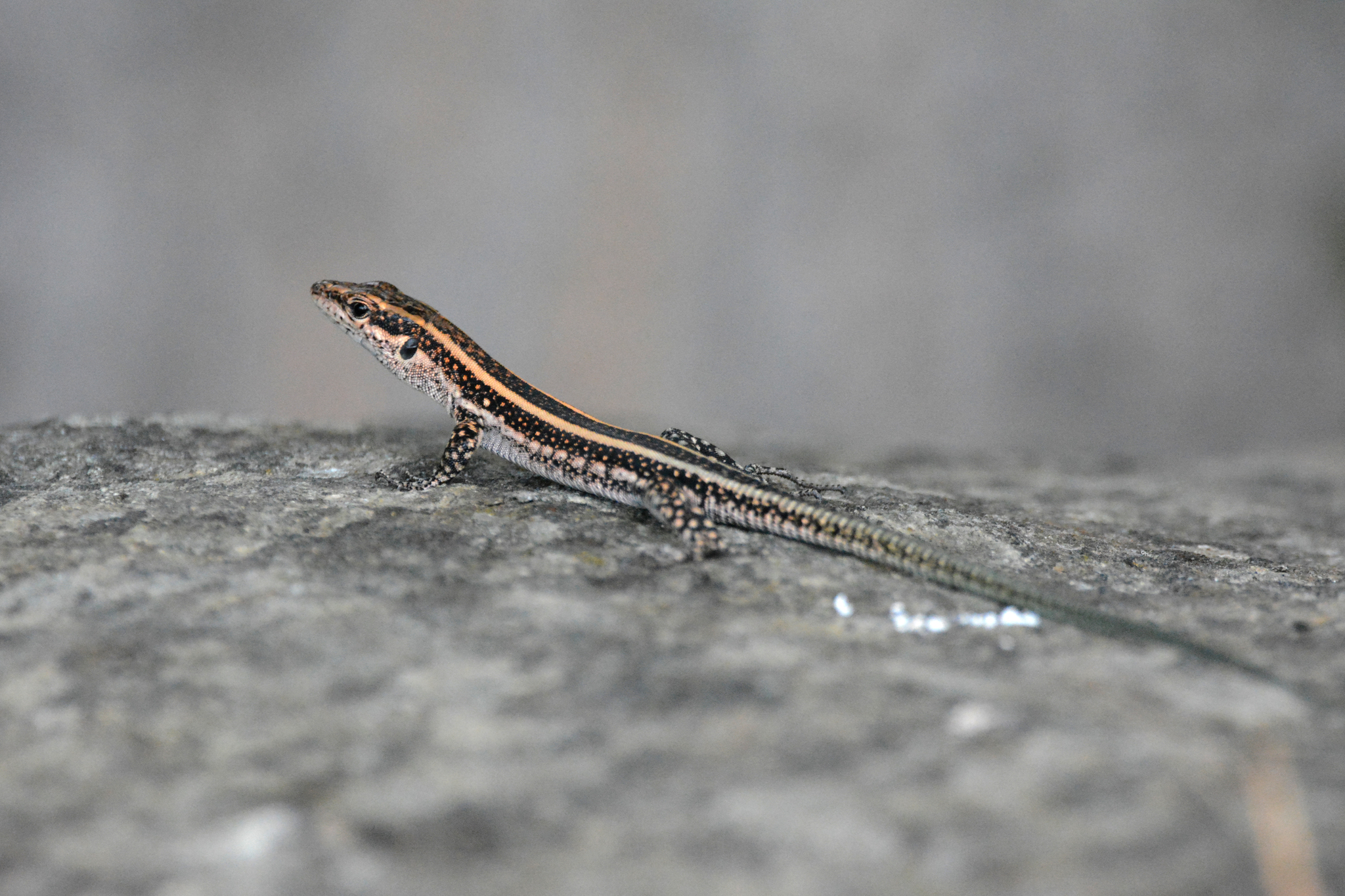

Scientific classification
- Domain: Eukaryota
- Kingdom: Animalia
- Phylum: Chordata
- Class: Reptilia
- Order: Squamata
- Family: Lacertidae
- Genus: Anatololacerta
- Species: A. ibrahimi

Binomial name
- Anatololacerta ibrahimi (Eiselt & Schmidtler, 1986)

= Anatololacerta ibrahimi =

Species of lizard

Anatololacerta ibrahimi, Baran's lizard, is a species of lizard found in Turkey.
