= Lacerta citrovittata =

Scientific classification
- Kingdom: Animalia
- Phylum: Chordata
- Class: Reptilia
- Order: Squamata
- Family: Lacertidae
- Genus: Lacerta
- Species: L. citrovittata

Binomial name
- Lacerta citrovittata Werner, 1938

Synonyms
- Lacerta trilineata citrovittata

Species of lizard

Lacerta citrovittata, the Tinos green lizard, is a species of lizard in the family Lacertidae. It is endemic to Greece.
