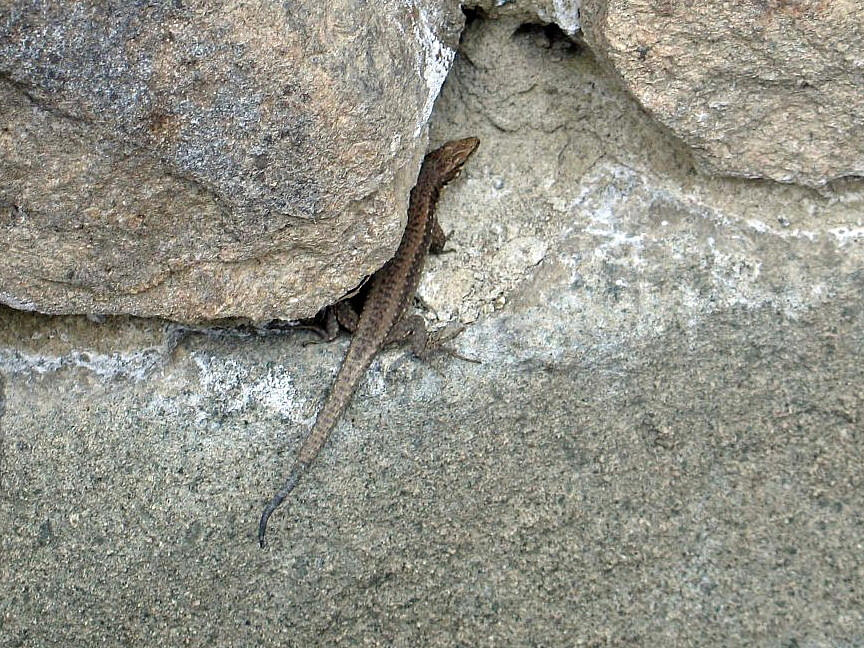

Conservation status
- Least Concern (IUCN 3.1)

Scientific classification
- Kingdom: Animalia
- Phylum: Chordata
- Class: Reptilia
- Order: Squamata
- Family: Lacertidae
- Genus: Anatololacerta
- Species: A. anatolica

Binomial name
- Anatololacerta anatolica Werner, 1902

Synonyms
- Lacerta danfordi ssp. anatolica Werner, 1902

= Anatolian rock lizard =

Species of lizard

The Anatolian rock lizard (Anatololacerta anatolica) is a species of lizard in the family Lacertidae. It is found in western Anatolia and on islands off the coast, where its natural habitats are temperate forests and rocky areas. A common species, the IUCN has listed it as being of "least concern".

== Description ==
This lizard grows to a snout-to-vent length of about 7.5 centimetres (3.0 in) with a tail twice as long as its body. The head and body are somewhat flattened, and the markings are rather variable. The basal colour is dark olive-brown, and there are usually two series of pale dorso-lateral spots which may merge into each other, forming lines. The areas between these stripes have further pale speckling. The throat may be reddish, but the rest of the underparts are pale, sometimes with a few dark spots on the flanks. Lizards on Icaria have particularly bold, contrasting markings.

== Distribution and habitat ==
The Anatolian rock lizard is endemic to the western Anatolian peninsula (Turkey) north of the Büyük Menderes River and to some Greek islands close to the coast. It is present on Samos, Icaria and Thymaina. It occurs at altitudes of up to 1,700 metres (5,600 ft) and its typical habitat is rocky outcrops, cliffs, boulders and dry stone walls. It is often present in rocky areas in woodland and near streams in otherwise arid locations.

== Status ==
The species has a wide range and is generally common. The population is large and stable, and the main threat it faces is wildfires. The International Union for Conservation of Nature has assessed its conservation status as being of "least concern".
