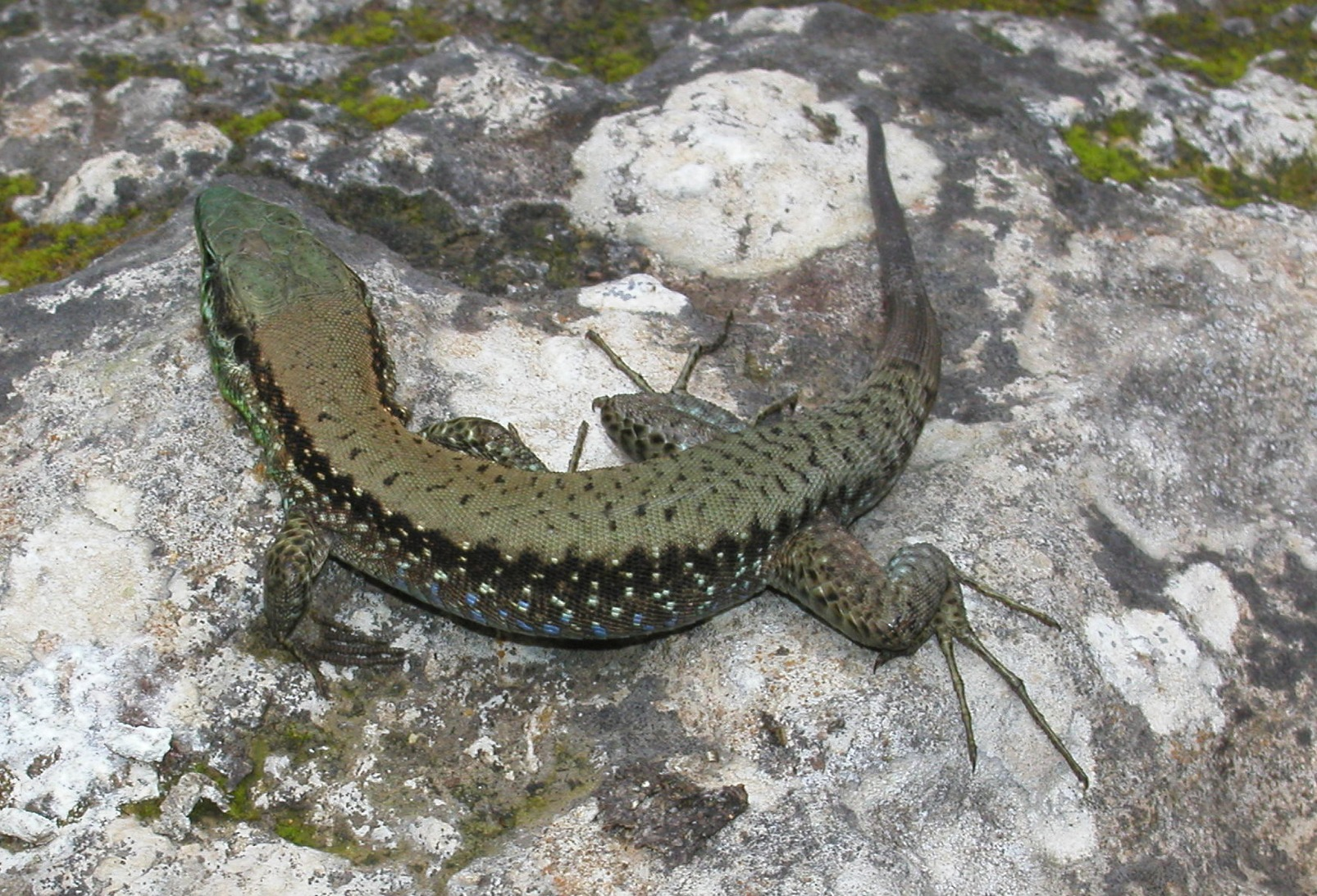

Conservation status
- Least Concern (IUCN 3.1)

Scientific classification
- Kingdom: Animalia
- Phylum: Chordata
- Class: Reptilia
- Order: Squamata
- Suborder: Lacertoidea
- Family: Lacertidae
- Genus: Phoenicolacerta
- Species: P. laevis

Binomial name
- Phoenicolacerta laevis (Gray, 1838)

Synonyms
- Lacerta laevis Gray 1838

= Phoenicolacerta laevis =

Species of lizard

Phoenicolacerta laevis, the Lebanon lizard, is a species of lizard in the family Lacertidae. It is found in Israel, west Jordan, Lebanon, north-west Syria and south Turkey. Its natural habitats are temperate forest, Mediterranean-type shrubby vegetation, rocky areas, arable land, pastureland, plantations, and rural gardens. It is threatened by habitat loss.
