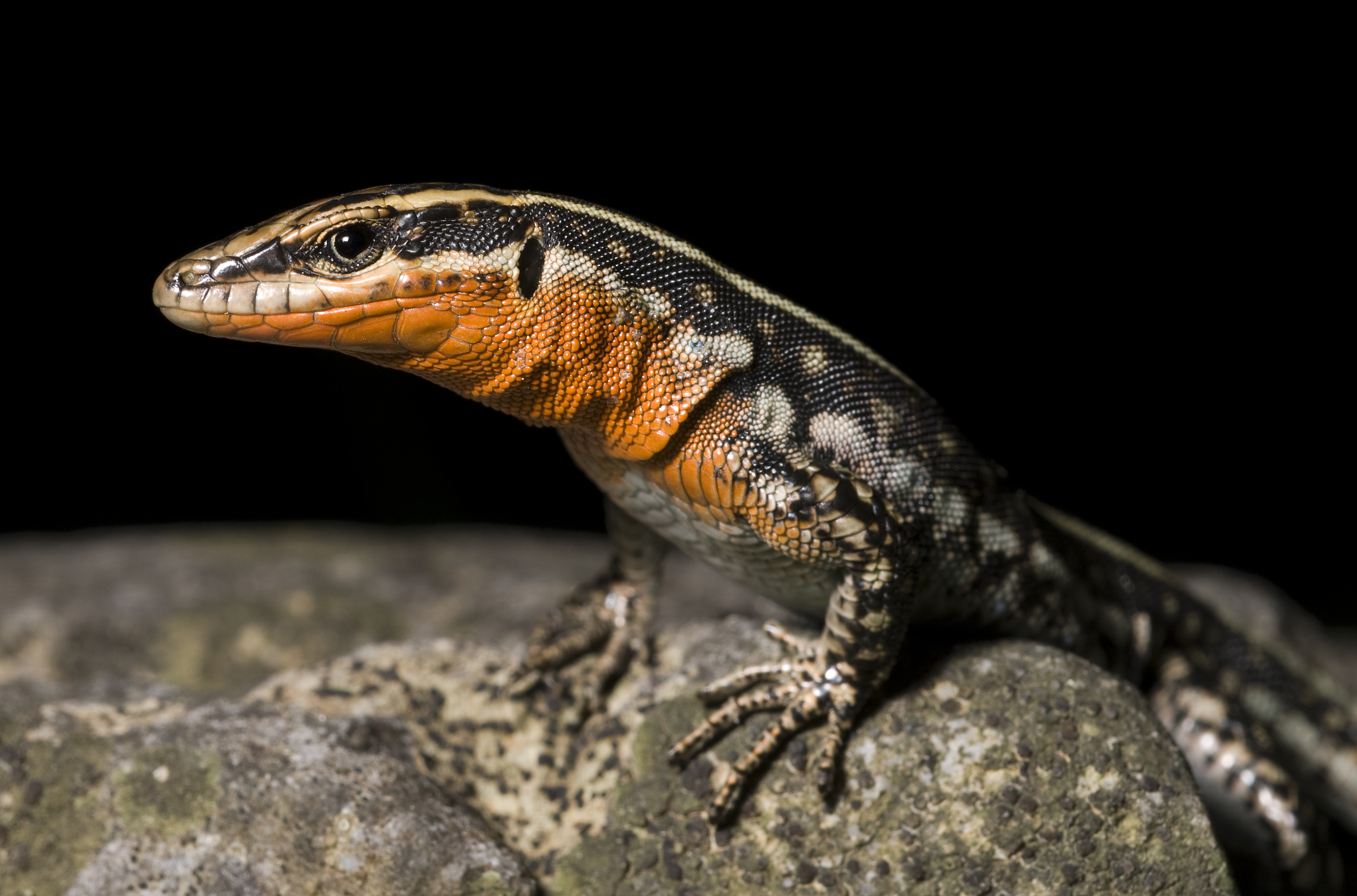

Conservation status
- Least Concern (IUCN 3.1)

Scientific classification
- Kingdom: Animalia
- Phylum: Chordata
- Class: Reptilia
- Order: Squamata
- Suborder: Lacertoidea
- Family: Lacertidae
- Genus: Anatololacerta
- Species: A. oertzeni

Binomial name
- Anatololacerta oertzeni Werner, 1904

= Anatololacerta oertzeni =

Species of lizard

Anatololacerta oertzeni, the rock lizard, is a species of lizard in the family Lacertidae. It is found in Greece and Turkey. Its natural habitats are Mediterranean-type shrubby vegetation, rocky areas, rocky shores, pastureland, plantations, and rural gardens.
