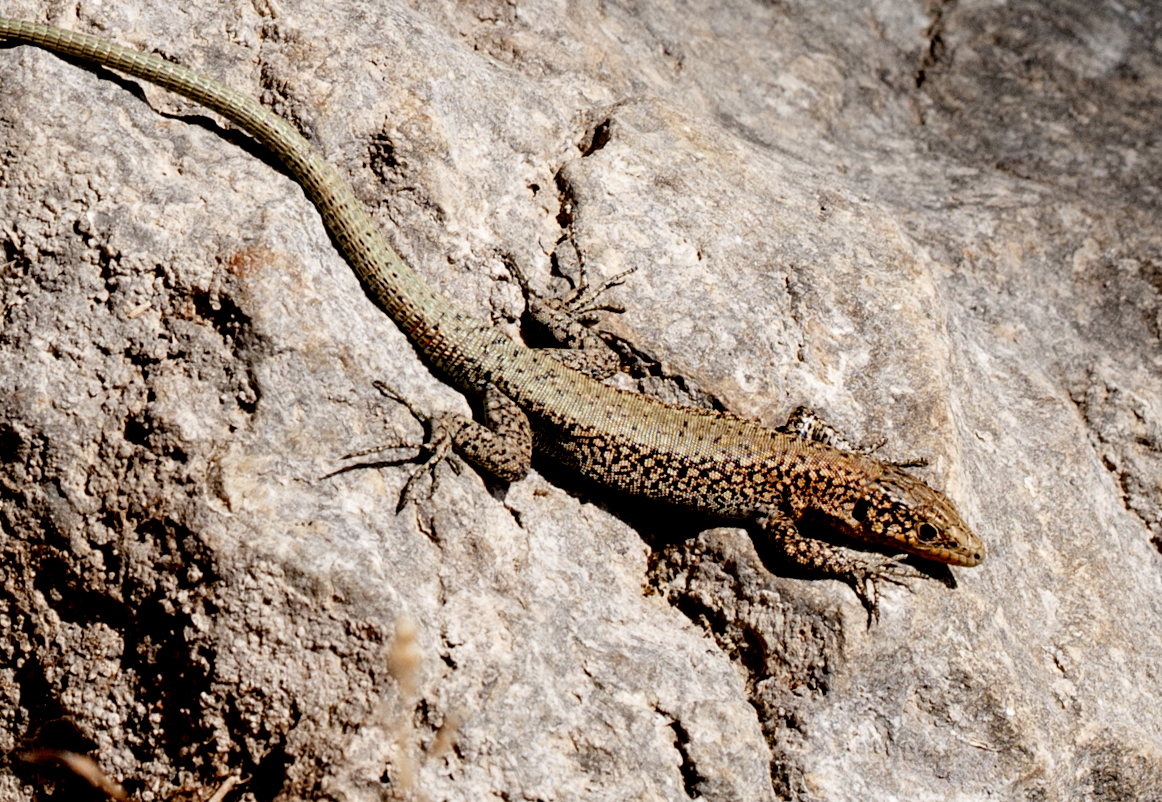

Conservation status
- Least Concern (IUCN 3.1)

Scientific classification
- Kingdom: Animalia
- Phylum: Chordata
- Class: Reptilia
- Order: Squamata
- Family: Lacertidae
- Genus: Anatololacerta
- Species: A. danfordi

Binomial name
- Anatololacerta danfordi (Günther, 1876)

Synonyms
- Zootoca danfordi Günther, 1876; Podarcis danfordi — Camerano, 1877; Lacerta danfordi — Bedriaga, 1879; Archaeolacerta danfordi — Sindaco et al., 2000; Anatololacerta danfordi — Arnold et al., 2007

= Danford's lizard =

Species of lizard

Danford's lizard (Anatololacerta danfordi) is a species of lizard in the family Lacertidae. The species is native to Greece and Turkey. There are no subspecies that are recognized as being valid.

== Etymology ==
The specific name, danfordi, is in honor of zoologist Charles G. Danford (1843–1928).

== Habitat ==
The preferred natural habitat of A. danfordi is rocky areas in forest and shrubland, at altitudes from sea level to 2,100 m (6,900 ft).

== Reproduction ==
A. danfordi is oviparous. An adult female may lay a clutch of 3–8 eggs.
