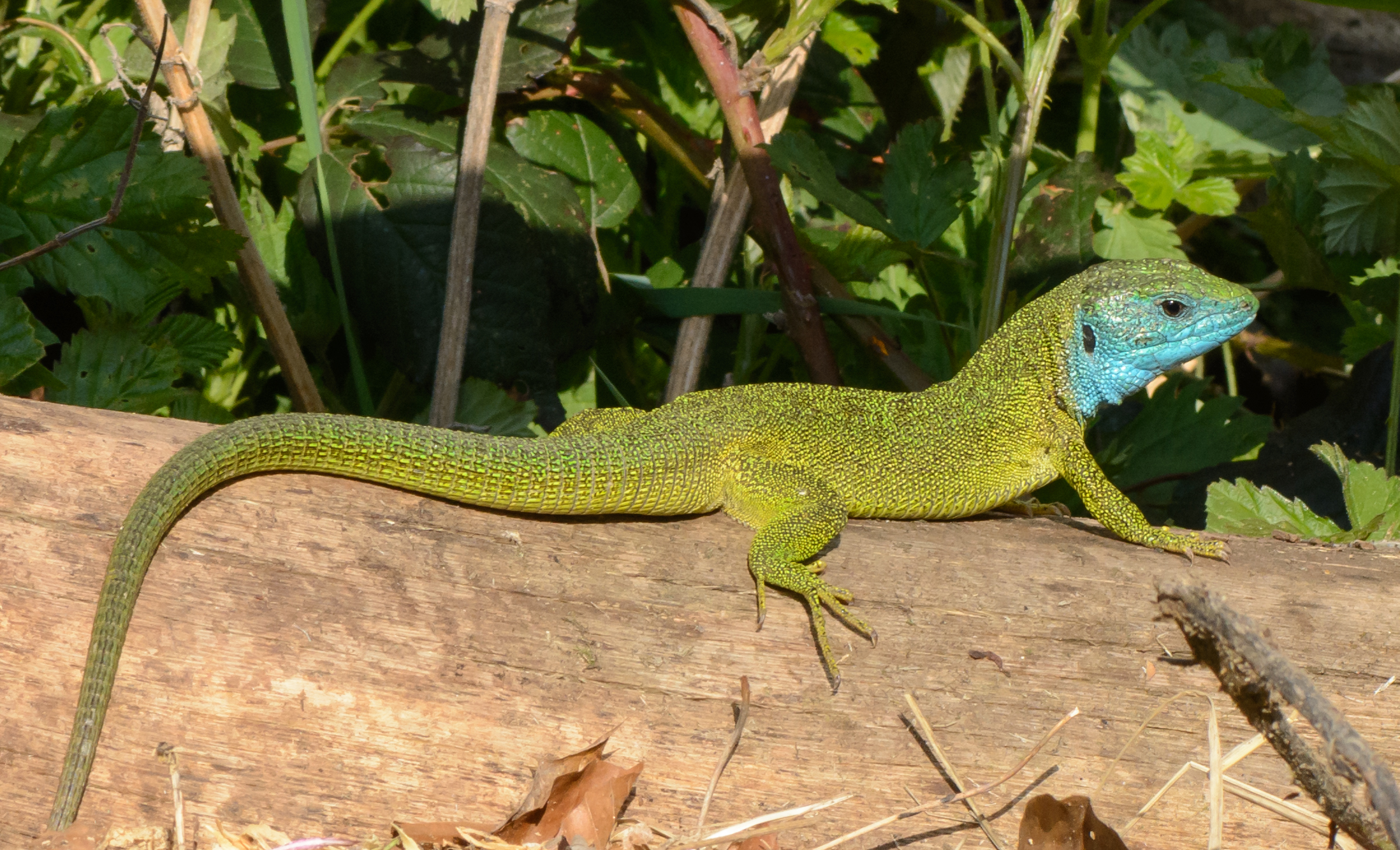
- Male
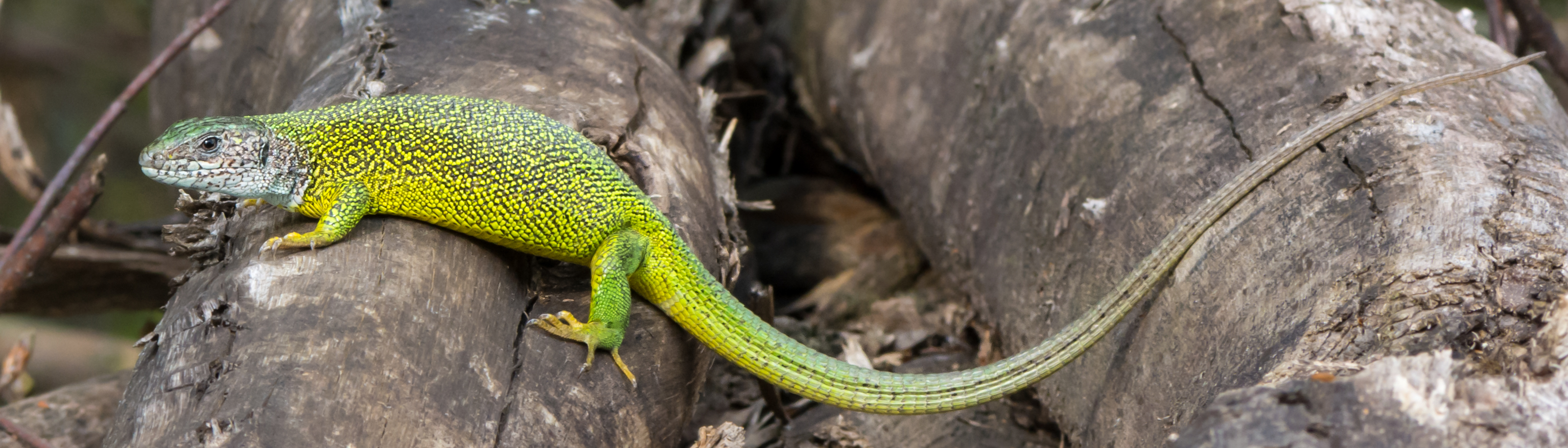
- Female

Conservation status
- Least Concern (IUCN 3.1)

Scientific classification
- Kingdom: Animalia
- Phylum: Chordata
- Class: Reptilia
- Order: Squamata
- Family: Lacertidae
- Genus: Lacerta
- Species: L. viridis

Binomial name
- Lacerta viridis (Laurenti, 1768)
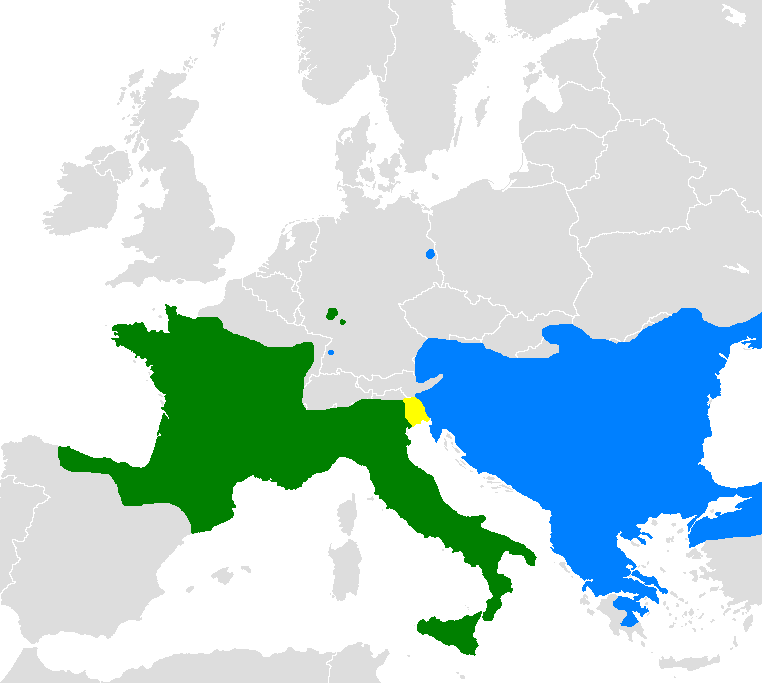
- Range of L. viridis in blue, and L. bilineata in green

Synonyms
- Seps viridis Laurenti, 1768

= European green lizard =

Species of lizard

The European green lizard (Lacerta viridis) is a large lizard distributed across European mid-latitudes from Slovenia and eastern Austria to as far east as the Black Sea coasts of Ukraine and Turkey. It is often seen sunning on rocks or lawns, or sheltering amongst bushes.

== Taxonomy ==
There is an ongoing discussion as to whether Lacerta viridis and Lacerta bilineata are separate species. Genetic data weakly supports their separation into two species, but more investigation needs to be done.

== Description ==
The lizard reaches up to 15 cm (5.9 in) from the tip of the muzzle to the cloaca. The tail can be up to twice the length of the body; the total length is up to 40 cm (16 in). This lizard sometimes sheds its tail (autotomy) to evade the grasp of a predator, regrowing it later.

The male has a larger head and a uniform green colour punctuated with small spots that are more pronounced upon its back. The throat is bluish in the adult male and to a lesser extent in the female. The female is more slender than the male and is more uniform in colour, often displaying between two and four light bands bordered by black spots.

== Distribution and habitat ==
The European green lizard is native to southeastern Europe. Its range extends from southern Germany, Austria, Hungary, the Czech Republic, Slovakia, Italy, Slovenia, Croatia, Bosnia & Herzegovina, Serbia, Montenegro, Albania, North Macedonia and Greece to southern Ukraine, Romania, Bulgaria and western Turkey. It is known from elevations up to 2,200 m (7,218 ft) above sea level; its typical habitat is dense bushy vegetation in open woodland, hedgerows, field margins, embankments and bramble thickets. In the northern part of its range it may be found on bushy heathland and in the southern part it prefers damp locations.

Various attempts have been made to introduce green lizards into Britain since the late 19th century, and a colony identified as L. bilineata has survived at Bournemouth since the late 1990s. L. bilineata also occurs in Jersey in the Channel Islands, where it may be native. It has been introduced into the state of Kansas in the United States.

== Behaviour ==
A pair of male European green lizards (Lacerta viridis viridis) fighting for dominance.

The European green lizard lives on the ground and in low, dense vegetation and likes to bask in the sun, early and late in the day. It feeds mainly on insects and other small invertebrates but it also sometimes takes fruit, birds eggs, fledglings, small lizards and even mice. In spring, the female lays six to twenty eggs which hatch in two to four months. Newly hatched juveniles are pale brown with a snout-to-vent length of 3 to 4 cm (1.2 to 1.6 in). They become mature the following year by which time they will have doubled in size.

== Predators ==
Predators include red foxes, badgers, domestic cats, birds such as buzzards, kestrels and crows, and snakes (such as adders).

== Status ==
The IUCN lists the European green lizard as being of "Least Concern". This is because it has a wide range and is common in at least part of that range. It is an adaptable species and no substantial threats have been identified over most of its range. However, in Turkey it may be affected by the use of pesticides.
