= Phoenicolacerta cyanisparsa =

Conservation status
- Least Concern (IUCN 3.1)

Scientific classification
- Kingdom: Animalia
- Phylum: Chordata
- Class: Reptilia
- Order: Squamata
- Suborder: Lacertoidea
- Family: Lacertidae
- Genus: Phoenicolacerta
- Species: P. cyanisparsa

Binomial name
- Phoenicolacerta cyanisparsa (Schmidtler & Bischoff, 1999)

Synonyms
- Lacerta cyanisparsa Schmidtler & Bischoff, 1999

Species of lizard

Phoenicolacerta cyanisparsa is a species of lizard in the family Lacertidae. It is found in Syria and Turkey. It is an egg-laying species. The population trend of Phoenicolacerta cyanisparsa is stable. It is abundant within its small range.

== Habitat ==
Its natural habitats are rocky habitats with Mediterranean-type shrubby vegetation. It can also occur in lightly grazed or cultivated areas.
