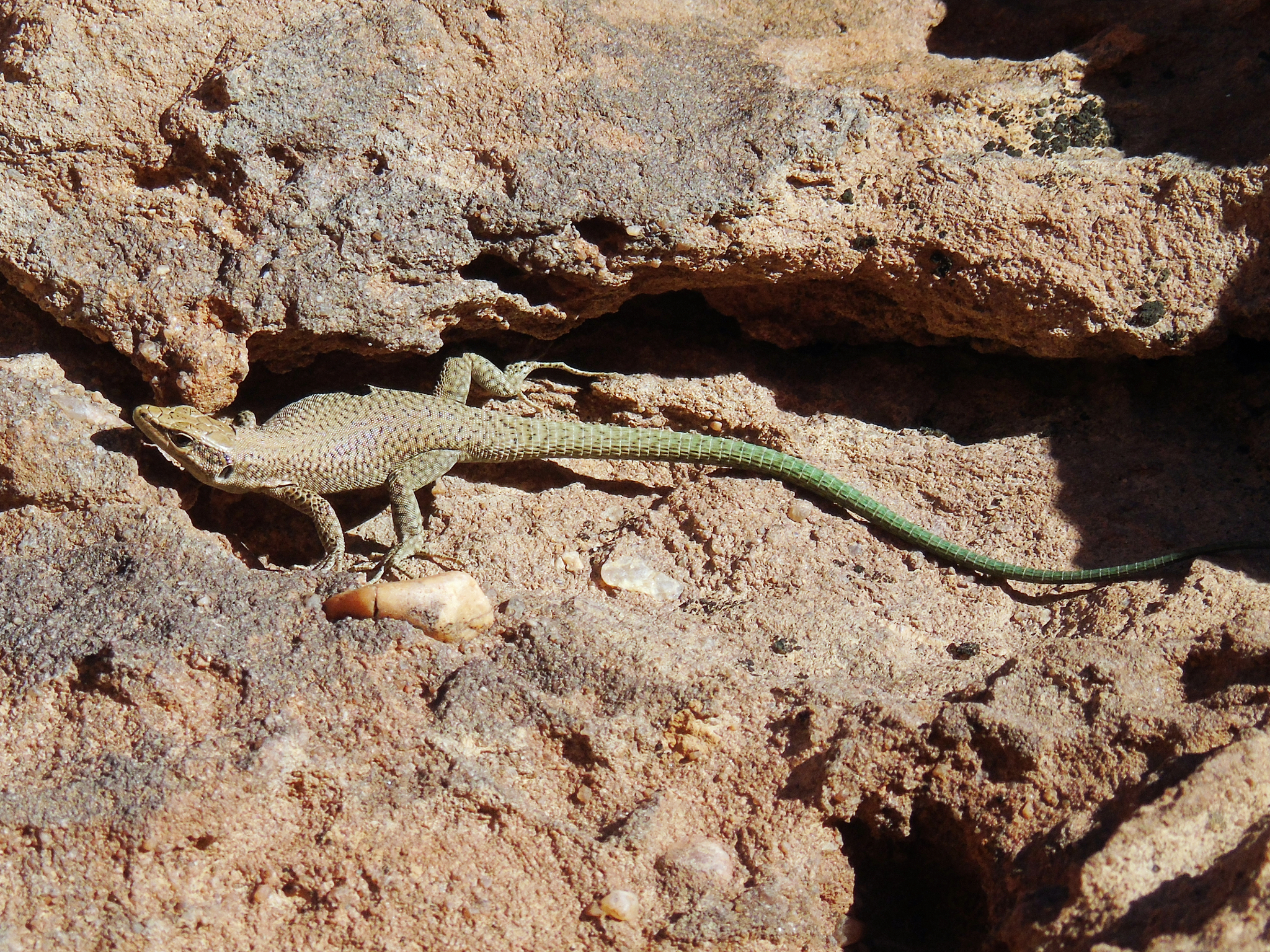
- Kulzer's Rock Lizard (Phoenicolacerta kulzeri) in Jordan

Conservation status
- Endangered (IUCN 3.1)

Scientific classification
- Kingdom: Animalia
- Phylum: Chordata
- Class: Reptilia
- Order: Squamata
- Family: Lacertidae
- Genus: Phoenicolacerta
- Species: P. kulzeri

Binomial name
- Phoenicolacerta kulzeri L. Müller & Wettstein, 1932

Synonyms
- Lacerta kulzeri L. Müller & Wettstein, 1932; Lacerta danfordi kulzeri — L. Müller & Wettstein, 1933; Lacerta laevis kulzeri — Eiselt & J.F. Schmidtler, 1987; Phoenicolacerta kulzeri — Arnold et al., 2007

= Phoenicolacerta kulzeri =

Species of lizard

Phoenicolacerta kulzeri, also known commonly as Kulzer's Lizard, Kulzer's rock lizard, and the Petra lizard, is a species of lizard in the family Lacertidae. The species is native to Western Asia.

== Etymology ==
The specific name, kulzeri, is in honor of German coleopterist Hans Kulzer (1889–1974), collector of the holotype.

== Geographic range ==
P. kulzeri is found in Israel, Jordan, Lebanon, and Syria.

== Habitat ==
The natural habitat of P. kulzeri is rocky areas.

== Reproduction ==
P. kulzeri is oviparous.

== Conservation status ==
P. kulzeri is threatened by habitat loss.

== Subspecies ==
Three subspecies are recognized as being valid, including the nominotypical subspecies.

- Phoenicolacerta kulzeri petraea (Bischoff & J. Müller, 1999)
- Phoenicolacerta kulzeri khasaliensis Modrý, Necas, Rifai, Bischoff, Hamidan & Amr, 2013
- Phoenicolacerta kulzeri kulzeri (L. Müller & Wettstein, 1932)

Nota bene: A trinomial authority in parentheses indicates that the subspecies was originally described in a genus other than Phoenicolacerta.

== Gallery ==
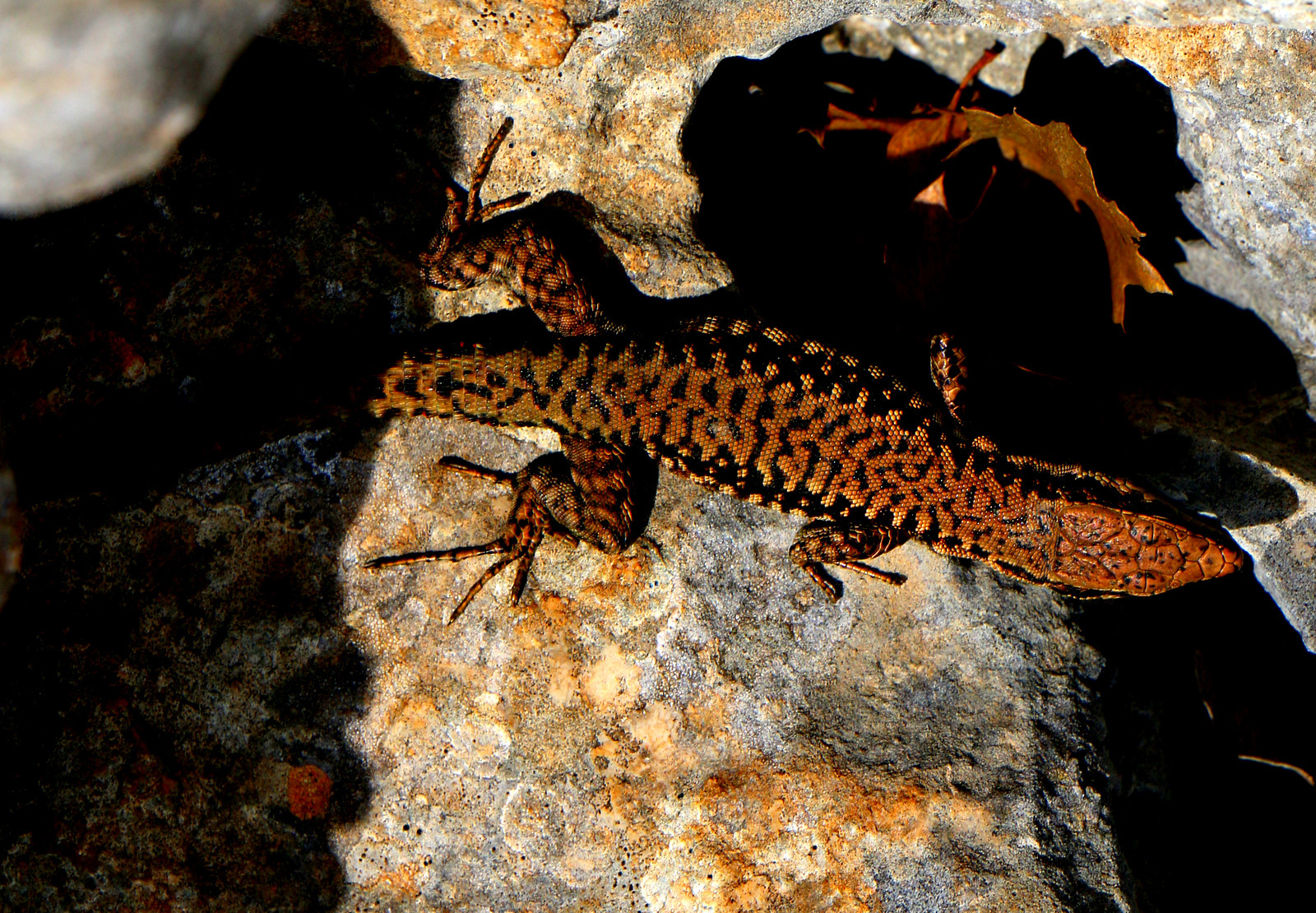
In Lebanon

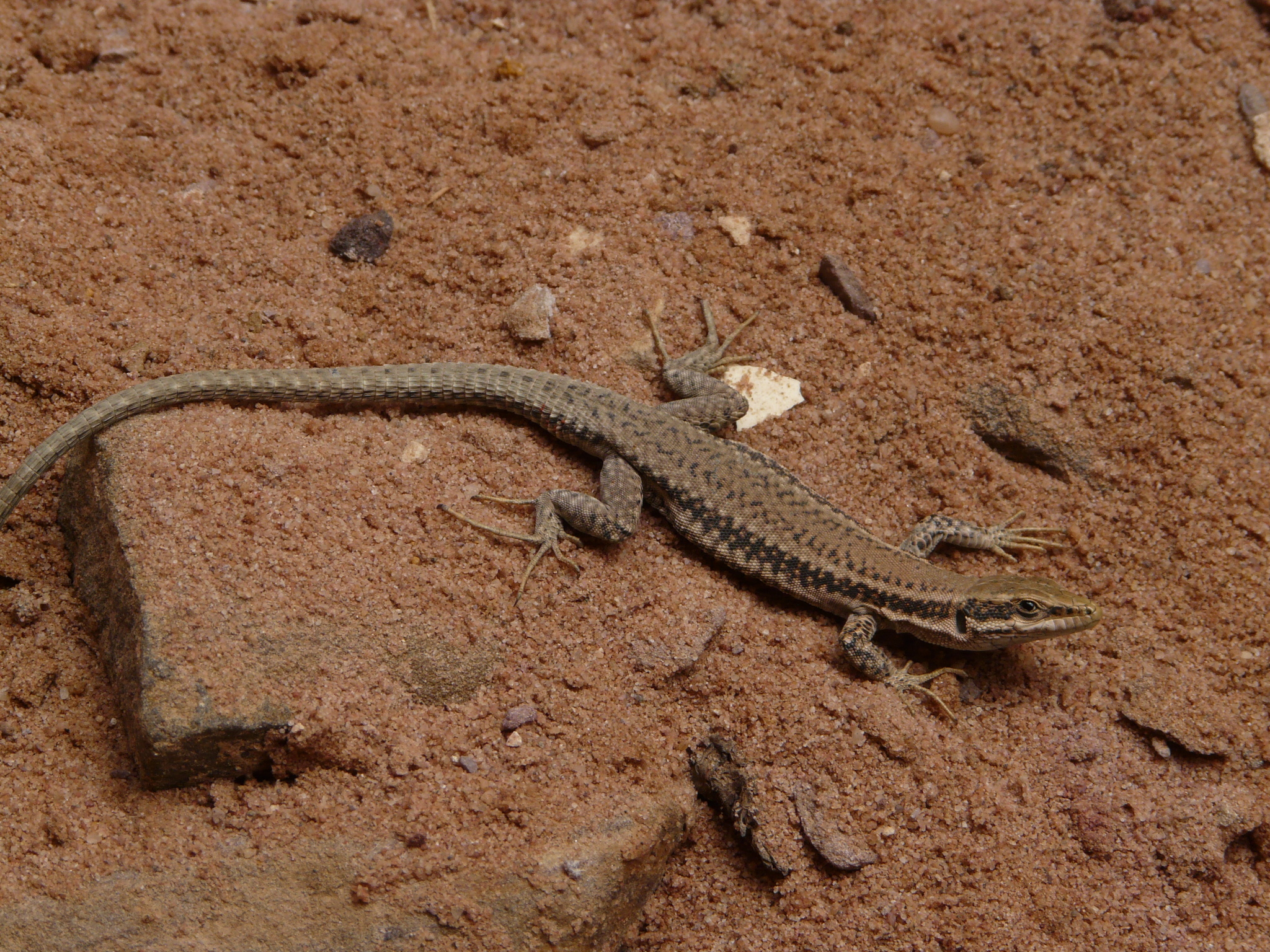
Phoenicolacerta kulzeri petraea in Jordan
