= SVL =

SVL may refer to:

- SVL, IATA code for Savonlinna Airport
- SVL, an experimental turbojet train
- Lobaev Sniper Rifle, (Snaj'perskaj'a Vintovka Lobaj'eva in Russian)
- Saginaw Valley League, a high school athletics conference in Michigan
- Scientific Vector Language
- Shakey's V-League, a volleyball league in the Philippines
- Snout–vent length, a measurement in herpetology.
- Sport Vereniging Langbroek, a multi-sports club in Langbroek, Netherlands
- Union of Clothing Workers, a former trade union in Finland
