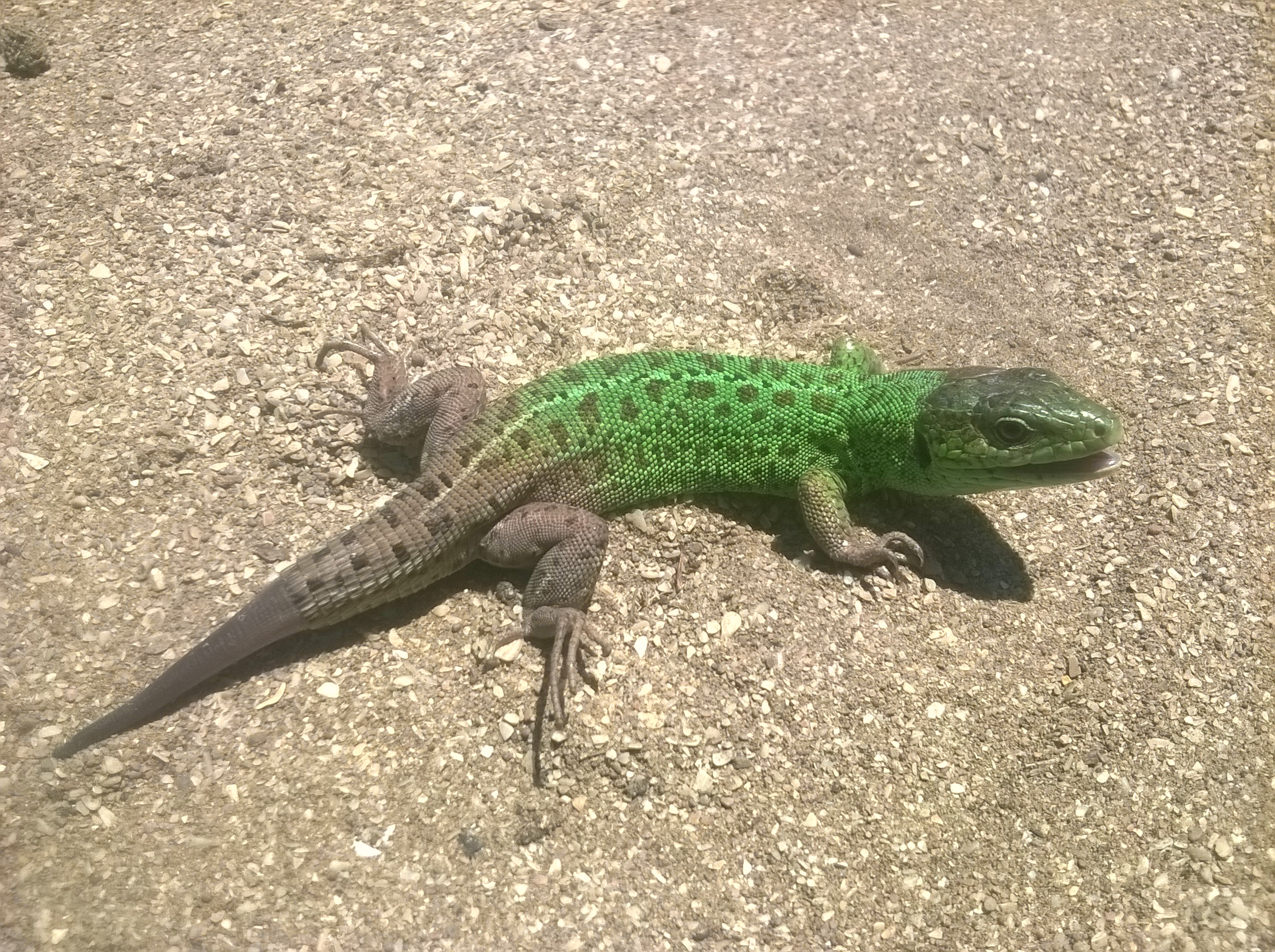

Conservation status
- Least Concern (IUCN 3.1)

Scientific classification
- Domain: Eukaryota
- Kingdom: Animalia
- Phylum: Chordata
- Class: Reptilia
- Order: Squamata
- Family: Lacertidae
- Genus: Lacerta
- Species: L. strigata

Binomial name
- Lacerta strigata Eichwald, 1831

= Lacerta strigata =

Species of lizard

Lacerta strigata, the Caucasus emerald lizard, five-streaked lizard, or Caspian green lizard, is a species of lizard in the family Lacertidae. It is found in Georgia, Armenia, Azerbaijan, Turkmenistan, Turkey, and Iran.
