= List of reptiles of Egypt =

Reptiles found in Egypt include:

== Family Gekkonidae ==
=== Genus Cyrtopodion ===
- Cyrtopodion scabrum

=== Genus Hemidactylus ===
- Hemidactylus flaviviridis
- Hemidactylus foudaii
- Hemidactylus mindiae
- Hemidactylus robustus
- Hemidactylus sinaitus
- Hemidactylus turcicus

=== Genus Pristurus ===
- Pristurus flavipunctatus

=== Genus Ptyodactylus ===
- Ptyodactylus guttatus
- Ptyodactylus hasselquistii
- Ptyodactylus ragazzii
- Ptyodactylus siphonorhina

=== Genus Stenodactylus ===
- Stenodactylus mauritanicus
- Stenodactylus petrii
- Stenodactylus sthenodactylus

=== Genus Tarentola ===
- Tarentola annularis
- Tarentola mauritanica
- Tarentola mindiae

=== Genus Tropiocolotes ===
- Tropiocolotes bisharicus
- Tropiocolotes nattereri
- Tropiocolotes nubicus
- Tropiocolotes steudneri
- Tropiocolotes tripolitanus

== Family Agamidae ==
=== Genus Agama ===
- Agama spinosa

=== Genus Laudakia ===
- Laudakia stellio

=== Genus Pseudotrapelus ===
- Pseudotrapelus sinaitus

=== Genus Trapelus ===
- Trapelus mutabilis
- Trapelus pallidus
- Trapelus savignii

=== Genus Uromastyx ===
- Uromastyx aegyptia
- Uromastyx ocellata
- Uromastyx ornata

== Family Chamaeleonidae ==
=== Genus Chamaeleo ===
- Chamaeleo africanus
- Chamaeleo chamaeleon

== Family Lacertidae ==
=== Genus Acanthodactylus ===
- Acanthodactylus aegyptius
- Acanthodactylus boskianus
- Acanthodactylus longipes
- Acanthodactylus pardalis
- Acanthodactylus scutellatus

=== Genus Latastia ===
- Latastia longicaudata

=== Genus Mesalina ===
- Mesalina bahaeldini
- Mesalina brevirostris
- Mesalina guttulata
- Mesalina martini
- Mesalina olivieri
- Mesalina pasteuri
- Mesalina rubropunctata

=== Genus Ophisops ===
- Ophisops elbaensis
- Ophisops elegans
- Ophisops occidentalis

=== Genus Philochortus ===
- Philochortus zolii

=== Genus Pseuderemias ===
- Pseuderemias mucronata

== Family Varanidae ==
=== Genus Varanus ===
- Varanus griseus
- Varanus niloticus

== Family Scincidae ==
=== Genus Ablepharus ===
- Ablepharus rueppellii

=== Genus Chalcides ===
- Chalcides ocellatus
- Chalcides cf. humilis

=== Genus Eumeces ===
- Eumeces schneiderii

=== Genus Scincus ===
- Scincus scincus

=== Genus Sphenops ===
- Sphenops sepsoides

=== Genus Trachylepis ===
- Trachylepis quinquetaeniata
- Trachylepis vittata

== Family Typhlopidae ==
=== Genus Ramphotyphlops ===
- Ramphotyphlops braminus

=== Genus Typhlops ===
- Typhlops vermicularis

== Family Leptotyphlopidae ==
=== Genus Leptotyphlops ===
- Leptotyphlops cairi
- Leptotyphlops macrorhynchus
- Leptotyphlops nursii

== Family Boidae ==
=== Genus Eryx ===
- Eryx colubrinus
- Eryx jaculus

== Family Colubridae ==
=== Genus Dasypeltis ===
- Dasypeltis scabra

=== Genus Dolichophis ===
- Dolichophis jugularis

=== Genus Eirenis ===
- Eirenis coronella

=== Genus Hemorrhois ===
- Hemorrhois algirus
- Hemorrohis nummifer

=== Genus Lycophidion ===
- Lycophidion capense

=== Genus Lytorhynchus ===
- Lytorhynchus diadema

=== Genus Macroprotodon ===
- Macroprotodon cucullatus

=== Genus Malpolon ===
- Malpolon moilensis
- Malpolon monspessulanus

=== Genus Natrix ===
- Natrix tessellata

=== Genus Platyceps ===
- Platyceps florulentus
- Platyceps rogersi
- Platyceps saharicus
- Platyceps sinai

=== Genus Psammophis ===
- Psammophis aegyptius
- Psammophis punctulatus
- Psammophis schokari
- Psammophis sibilans

=== Genus Rhynchocalamus ===
- Rhynchocalamus melanocephalus

=== Genus Spalerosophis ===
- Spalerosophis diadema

=== Genus Telescopus ===
- Telescopus dhara
- Telescopus hoogstraali

== Family Elapidae ==
=== Genus Naja ===
- Naja haje
- Naja nubiae

=== Genus Walterinnesia ===
- Walterinnesia aegyptia

== Family Atractaspididae ==
=== Genus Atractaspis ===
- Atractaspis engaddensis

== Family Viperidae ==
=== Genus Cerastes ===
- Cerastes cerastes
- Cerastes vipera

=== Genus Echis ===
- Echis coloratus
- Echis pyramidum

=== Genus Pseudocerastes ===
- Pseudocerastes fieldi

== Family Crocodylidae ==
=== Genus Crocodylus ===
- Crocodylus niloticus

== Family Testudinidae ==
=== Genus Testudo ===
- Testudo kleinmanni

== Family Cheloniidae ==
=== Genus Caretta ===
- Caretta caretta

=== Genus Chelonia ===
- Chelonia mydas

=== Genus Eretmochelys ===
- Eretmochelys imbricata

=== Genus Lepidochelys ===
- Lepidochelys olivacea

== Family Dermochelyidae ==
=== Genus Dermochelys ===
- Dermochelys coriacea

== Family Trionychidae ==
=== Genus Trionyx ===
- Trionyx triunguis

== Family Emydidae ==
=== Genus Trachemys ===
- Trachemys scripta (introduced)
