= List of reptiles of Qatar =

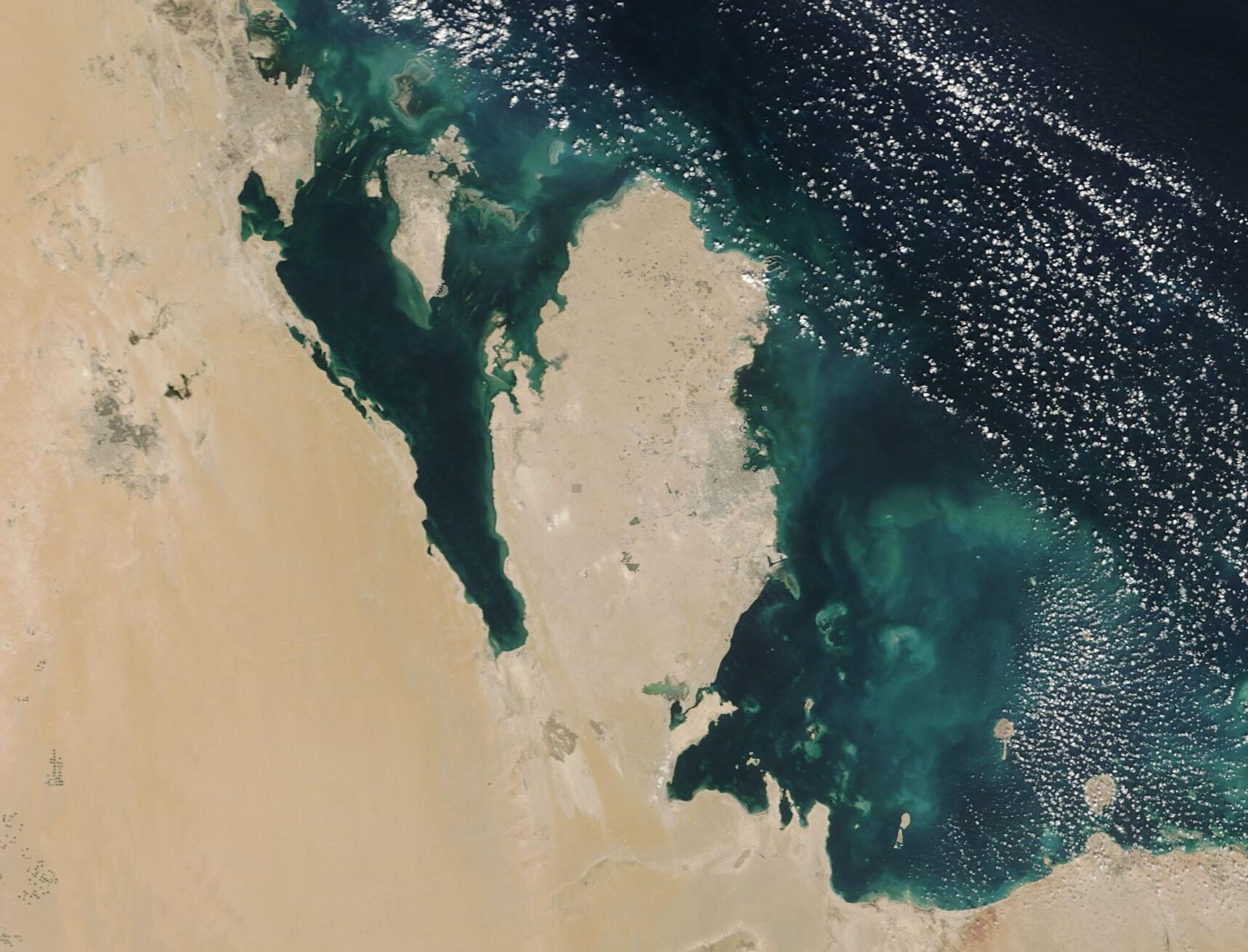
A satellite image of Qatar taken in 2022

Qatar is a nation situated eastwards of the Arabian Peninsula of which it is considered a part of. Upwards of 30 reptile species have been recorded as living in the country. Most of the country is arid, with a presence of dunes in the far south, close to neighbouring Saudi Arabia.

Qatar possesses three forms of environment in which reptiles can be observed – arid, urban, and marine. The country is relatively even in height and low, as its highest natural point is only 103 metres above sea level.

There are several species that are considered dangerous, thus an exclamation mark (!) will be used to highlight a species that may cause harm to humans, and a skull ( (executed) ) if the animal is responsible for at least one human fatality.

== Sea turtles ==
Order: Testudines Family: Cheloniidae

Cheloniidae is a family of sea turtles with cosmopolitan distribution. The family contains seven species in five genera. Two of these species have been recorded in Qatar.

Common name	Binomial name	Carapace length	Mass	Global status	Global trend	Distribution	Image
Green turtle	Chelonia mydas	150 cm (59 in)	160 kg (350 lb)	Endangered	▼	Primarily aquatic. May be found at coasts or islands where it comes to nest.	
Hawksbill turtle	Eretmochelys imbricata)	100 cm (39 in)	80 kg (180 lb)	Critically endangered	▼	Primarily aquatic, and most likely to nest in Fuwayrit given its soft sand	

== Leatherback turtle ==
Order: Testudines Family: Dermochelyidae

Dermochelyidae is a family of turtles which historically had 7 species. Currently, only one species still exists - the leatherback turtle. It is the largest member of its order, and the third-largest reptile in terms of average mass. Though uncommon, it has been reported in the country.

Common name	Binomial name	Carapace length	Mass	Global status	Trend	Distribution	Image
Leatherback turtle	Dermochelys coriacea	230 cm (91 in)	600 kg (1,300 lb)	Vulnerable	▼	Primarily aquatic, rare to see in the country.	

== Geckos ==
Order: Squamata Family: Gekkonidae

Gekkonidae is a large family of cosmopolitan lizards. It is a remarkably diverse family with upwards of a thousand species. Bearing specially designed pads on their toes, geckos are granted effective adhesion to several surfaces. Vernacularly known as “بريعصي", there are at least 10 species in Qatar.

Common name	Binomial name	Length	Global status	Trend	Habitat and distribution	Image
Big-headed gecko	Stenodactylus slevini	10 cm (3.9 in)	Least concern	Steady	A nocturnal lizard. It inhabits compact dry environments with shrubs.	
Northern house gecko	Hemidactylus flaviviridis	15 cm (5.9 in)	Least concern	▲	This nocturnal lizard favours urban environments, inhabiting homes as well as abandoned ruins where it may find insect prey. Individuals can be found hiding in crevices or under surfaces.	
Baluch stone gecko	Bunopus tuberculatus	10 cm (3.9 in)	Least concern	Steady	Like other nocturnal lizard, the stone gecko inhabits arid and rural regions. During the day, it prefers to hide under rocks and is active at night, searching the habitat for food.	
Keeled rock gecko	Cyrtopodion scabrum	10 cm (3.9 in)	Least concern	Steady	Prefers to hide out in uninhabited towns and buildings during the day.	
Arabian sand gecko	Trigonodactylus arabicus	12 cm (4.7 in)	Least concern	Steady	Hides in burrows during the day. It is strictly ground-dwelling and may be found in open deserts or at dunes in the south and Doha during nighttime	
Gulf sand gecko	Pseudoceramodactylus khobarensis	12 cm (4.7 in)	Least concern	▼	Found in mainland Qatar as well as the offshore islands in which it was first observed. It prefers soil and soft sand and may be encountered in beaches.	
Heyden's gecko	Hemidactylus robustus	10 cm (3.9 in)	Least concern	▲	Found on the mainland, it tolerates a wide variety of habitat. Hiding during the day, it can be found in fields, sparse semi-deserts and urban environments.	
Persian leaf-toed gecko	Hemidactylus persicus	10 cm (3.9 in)	Least concern	Steady	Endemic to Halul island, has not been found in the mainland. Found elsewhere in the Persian Gulf	

== Agamids ==
Order: Squamata Family: Agamidae

Agamidae is a large family of Old World lizards distributed across a multitude of habitats. Globally, the family contains approximately 350 species.

Common name	Binomial name	Length	Global status	Trend	Habitat and distribution	Image
Jayakar's agama	Agama flavimaculata	25 cm (9.8 in)	Least concern	Steady	Diurnal and found in open rocky areas. In breeding season, males acquire extreme colour changes as the head becomes blue and the tail red.	
Sinai agama	Pseudotrapelus sinaitus	25 cm (9.8 in)	Least concern	▲	Similar to the Jayakar's agama in both behaviour and shape.	
Toad-headed agama	Phrynocephalus arabicus	20 cm (7.9 in)	Least concern	Steady	This species is diurnal and prefers soft sand, as is found in the dunes at Doha.	
Giant spike-tailed agama	Uromastyx aegyptia	75 cm (30 in)	Vulnerable	▼	Prefers open desert throughout the country, particularly arid regions with dense sand, allowing it to burrow	

== Skinks ==
Order: Squamata Family: Scincidae

Scincidae is a family of lizards, commonly known as skinks. It is one of the biggest families in the entire order, bearing well over 1,500 species. They are primarily terrestrial and insectivorous.

Common name	Binomial name	Length	Global status	Trend	Habitat and distribution	Image
Eastern sandfish	Scincus mitranus	20 cm (7.9 in)	Least concern	Steady	A diurnal lizard, this species is found in the south of the countries exclusively inhabiting dunes, as it dives under the sand when a threat is perceived.	
Ocellated skink	Chalcides ocellatus	26 cm (10 in)	Least concern	Steady	Inhabits overgrowth and meadow-like environments in Qatar. May be found in parks as a result.	
Golden grass-skink	Heremites septemtaeniatus	18 cm (7.1 in)	Least concern	Steady	Possibly introduced, this skink exclusively inhabits man-made habitats like gardens and lawns in the country	

== Monitors ==
Order: Squamata Family: Varanidae

Varanidae is a family of highly predatory and venomous lizards in the old world. There are about 45 species, one of which is found in Qatar.

Common name	Binomial name	Length	Global status	Trend	Habitat and distribution	Image
Desert monitor (!)	Varanus griseus	110 cm (43 in)	Least concern	▼	Once common throughout open deserts in the country, this is now a scarce species. It prefers vast plains where it can spot and chase down prey.	

== True Lizards ==
Order: Squamata Family: Lacertidae

Lacertidae is a family diverse family of lizards, of which the entire suborder derived its name.

Common name	Binomial name	Length	Global status	Trend	Habitat and distribution	Image
Fringe-toed sand lizard	Acanthodactylus boskianus	15 cm (5.9 in)	Least concern	Steady	Found in coastal plains, oases and cultivated regions. Diurnal.	
Nidua	Acanthodactylus scutellatus	15 cm (5.9 in)	Least concern	Steady	Prefers open desert and shrubbery.	
Short-nosed desert lizard	Eremias brevirostris	15 cm (5.9 in)	Least concern	Steady	Found nationwide in scrubs, as well as wide sandy areas.	
Arnold's fringe-fingered lizard	Acanthodactylus opheodurus	18 cm (7.1 in)	Least concern	Steady	Inhabits arid desert with shrubbery, particularly because females deposit eggs in holes dug under bushes.	
Schmidt's fringe-fingered lizard	Acanthodactylus opheodurus	18 cm (7.1 in)	Least concern	Steady	Found in more sandy areas, especially dunes near the capital Doha	
Hadramout sand lizard	Mesalina adramitana	12 cm (4.7 in)	Least concern	N/A	Found in more sandy areas, especially dunes near the capital Doha	

== Palaearctic worm-lizard ==
Order: Squamata Family: Trogonophidae

Trogonophidae is a family of amphisbaenians. They do not possess any limbs and engage in a primarily underground lifestyle.

Common name	Binomial name	Length	Global status	Trend	Habitat and distribution	Image
Arabian worm-lizard	Diplometopon zarudnyi	30 cm (12 in)	Least concern	Steady	Inhabiting soft soils as well as caves, thus subterranean animal is not common in the country due to its adapted habitat.	

== Colubrids ==
Order: Squamata Family: Colubridae

Colubridae is the largest family of snakes, with over 230 species. They are primarily constrictors, however there are some species that possess venom.

Common name	Binomial name	Length	Global status	Trend	Habitat and distribution	Image
Glossy-bellied racer	Platyceps ventromaculatus	120 cm (47 in)	Least concern	Steady	This non-venomous snake prefers both desert and man-made environments especially to hide.	
Afro-Asian sand snake	Psammophis schokari	100 cm (39 in)	Least concern	?	Mildly venomous, or prefers areas with vegetation and avoids barren desert.	
False cobra	Malpolon moilensis	170 cm (67 in)	Least concern	Steady	Found further from urban environments, preferring to inhabit open desert and barren outcrops.	
Crowned leaf-nosed snake	Lytorhinchus diadema	30 cm (12 in)	Least concern	Steady	This small non-venomous snake lives all across the country, preferring soft sand and gravel plains.	
Diadem ratsnake	Spalerosophis diadema	170 cm (67 in)	Least concern	Steady	Mildly venomous snake, found in sandy habitats and open desert in Qatar, as well as savannahs elsewhere.	
Dwarf crowned racer	Eirenis coronella	30 cm (12 in)	Least concern	Steady	A non venomous snake that inhabits temperate environments. In Qatar it prefers man-made agricultural habitats.	

== Sea snakes ==
Order: Squamata Family: Hydrophiinae

Hydrophiinae is a family of snakes, most of which are highly venomous. They inhabit coastal environments and are specially adapted for an aquatic lifestyle.

Common name	Binomial name	Length	Global status	Trend	Habitat and distribution	Image
Blue-banded sea snake (executed)	Hydrophis cyanocinctus	180 cm (71 in)	Least concern	?	A highly venomous snake that inhabits shallow waters in the indo-pacific.	
Persian Gulf sea snake	Hydrophis lapemoides	95 cm (37 in)	Least concern	Steady	Common in the Indian Ocean. May be found in coastal waters and reefs	
Yellow banded sea-snake (!)	Pelamis pelaturus	2.75 m (9 ft 0 in)	Least concern	?	Perhaps the largest sea snake, it inhabits shallow water in the Indo-pacific.	
Yellow-bellied sea snake (executed) .	Pelamis platurus	65 cm (26 in)	Least concern	Steady	Very flattened and adaptable when it comes to marine environments; may be found in deeper water.	

== Vipers ==
Order: Squamata Family: Viperidae

Viperidae is a family of highly venomous snakes found throughout the majority of the mainland continents. It is a relatively diverse family with more than 200 species.

Common name	Binomial name	Length	Global status	Trend	Habitat and distribution	Image
Arabian horned viper (!)	Cerastes gasperettii	75 cm (30 in)	Least concern	Steady	Distributed through the peninsula, this viper prefers vegetated habitats with soft sand in which it partially buries itself.	
Saw-scaled viper (executed)	Echis carinatus	50 cm (20 in)	Least concern	Steady	Found in man-made habitats as well as deserts from the Indian subcontinent to the Arabian peninsula	

== Boas ==
Order: Squamata Family: Boidae

Boidae is a family of nonvenomous constricting snakes that inhabit tropical and semi-tropical regions. There are over 40 species in the family.

Common name	Binomial name	Length	Global status	Trend	Habitat and distribution	Image
Arabian sand boa	Eryx jayakari	40 cm (16 in)	Least concern	Steady	Widespread across the peninsula as well as Iran. It hides under deep sand in the day and is only active during darkness	

== Elapids ==
Order: Squamata Family: Elapidae

Elapidae is a family of highly venomous snakes with non-retractable fangs. It includes the well-known cobras. There are over 300 species in the family.

Common name	Binomial name	Length	Global status	Trend	Habitat and distribution	Image
Desert black snake (executed)	Walterinnesia morgani	60 cm (24 in)	Least concern	▼	Exclusively nocturnal, this species inhabits east Arabia. It prefers vegetated sandy habitats	
