= Parbatthorax =

Scientific classification
- Kingdom: Animalia
- Phylum: Arthropoda
- Subphylum: Chelicerata
- Class: Arachnida
- Order: Araneae
- Infraorder: Araneomorphae
- Family: Linyphiidae
- Genus: Parbatthorax; Tanasevitch, 2019

Type species
- P. unicornis Tanasevitch, 2019

Species
- Parbatthorax proiectus Irfan & Peng, 2019; Parbatthorax unicornis Tanasevitch, 2019
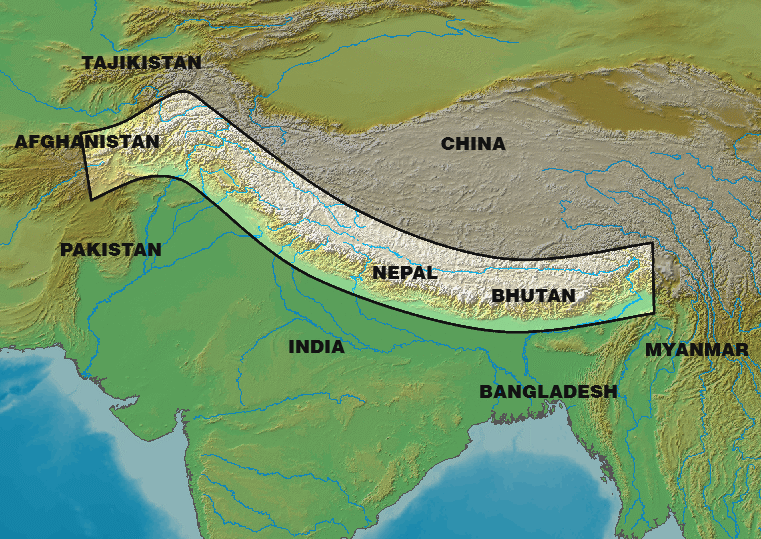
- The general location of the Himalayas mountain range

Genus of spiders

Parbatthorax is a small genus of Asian sheet weavers first described by A. V. Tanasevitch in 2019. As of April 2022 it contains only two species: P. proiectus and P. unicornis. Its appearance resembles members of Gongylidioides and Glebala, but it can be distinguished by the unique shape of its carapace and a highly modified palpal tibia and paracymbium. The genus name is a combination of the Parbat District, where the first specimen was found, and the "thorax", whose unique shape is one of its distinguishing factors.
