= Palestine kukri snake =

There are two species of snake named Palestine kukri snake:

- Rhynchocalamus melanocephalus
- Rhynchocalamus satunini
