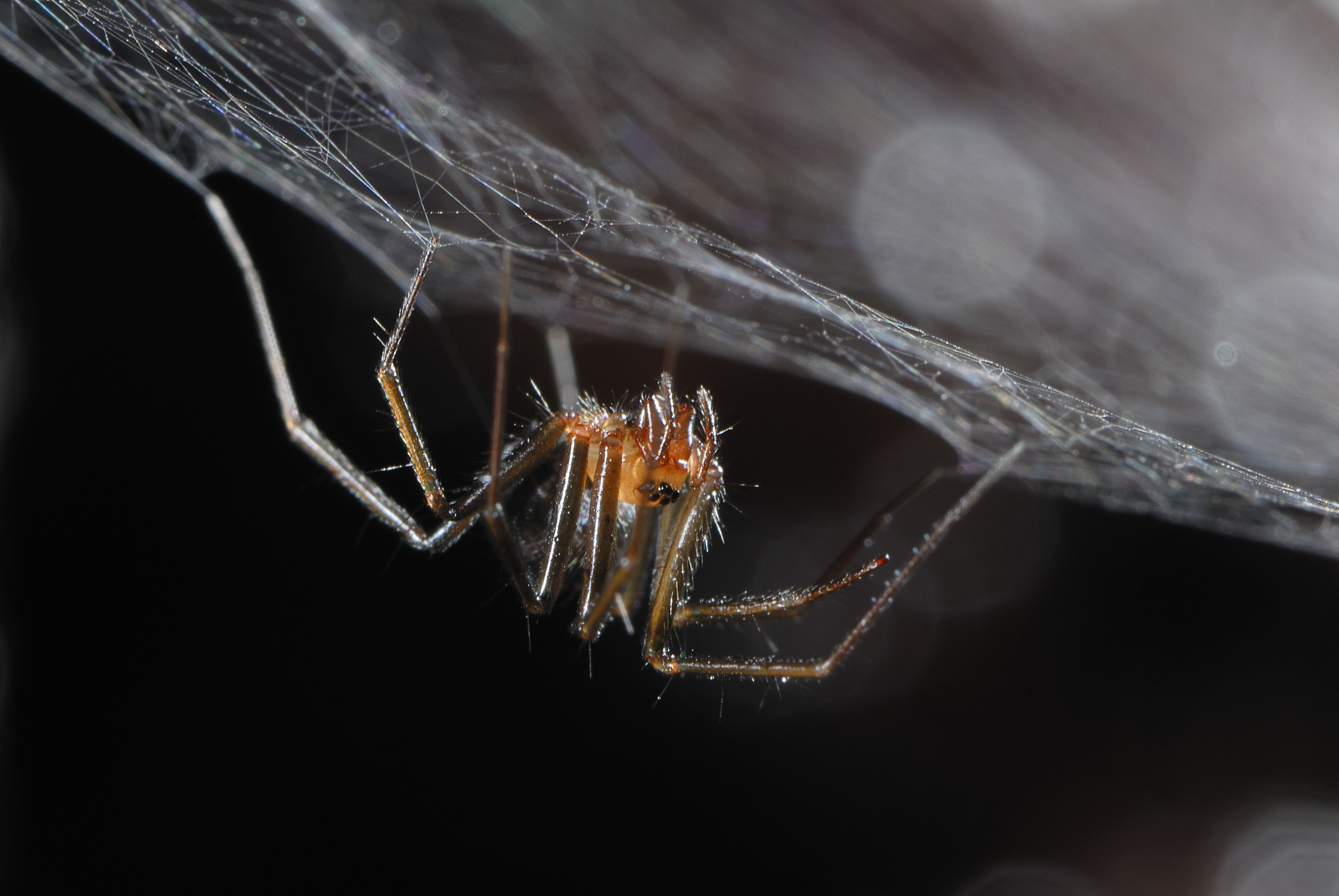
- T. cavernicola, female

Scientific classification
- Kingdom: Animalia
- Phylum: Arthropoda
- Subphylum: Chelicerata
- Class: Arachnida
- Order: Araneae
- Infraorder: Araneomorphae
- Family: Linyphiidae
- Genus: Turinyphia van Helsdingen, 1982

Type species
- T. clairi (Simon, 1884)

Species
- 4, see text

= Turinyphia =

Genus of spiders

Turinyphia is a genus of sheet weavers that was first described by P. J. van Helsdingen in 1982.

== Species ==
As of June 2019 it contains four species:

- Turinyphia cavernicola Wunderlich, 2008 – Azores
- Turinyphia clairi (Simon, 1884) (type) – Southern Europe
- Turinyphia maderiana (Schenkel, 1938) – Madeira
- Turinyphia yunohamensis (Bösenberg & Strand, 1906) – China, Korea, Japan
