= Wiehlenarius =

Scientific classification
- Kingdom: Animalia
- Phylum: Arthropoda
- Subphylum: Chelicerata
- Class: Arachnida
- Order: Araneae
- Infraorder: Araneomorphae
- Family: Linyphiidae
- Genus: Wiehlenarius; Eskov, 1990

Type species
- W. boreus Eskov, 1990

Species
- 2, see text

Genus of spiders

Wiehlenarius is a genus of sheet weavers that was first described by K. Y. Eskov in 1990.

== Species ==
As of June 2019 it contains only two species:

- Wiehlenarius boreus Eskov, 1990 – Russia
- Wiehlenarius tirolensis (Schenkel, 1939) – Switzerland, Austria, Greece
