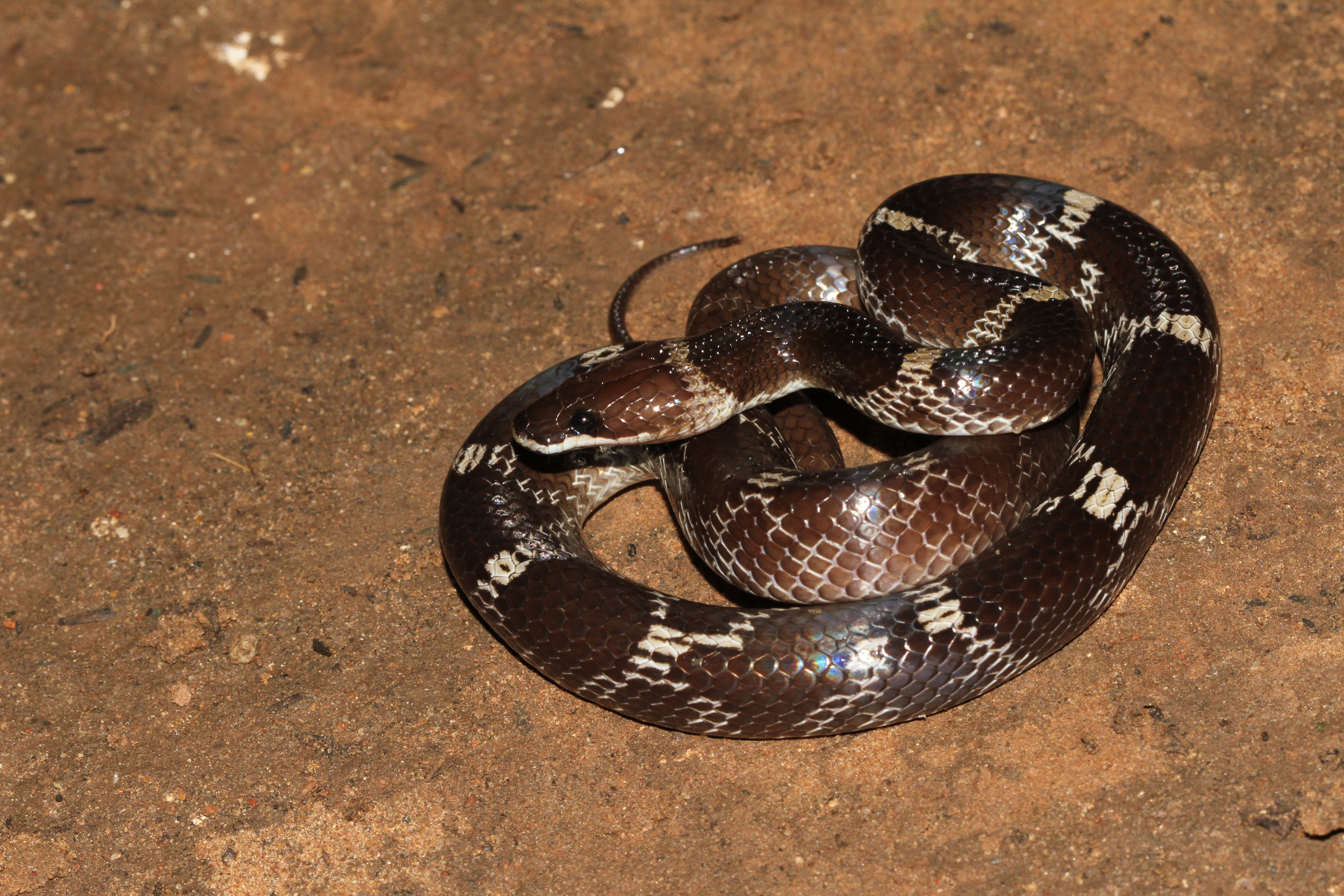
- Indian wolf snake

Conservation status
- Least Concern (IUCN 3.1)

Scientific classification
- Kingdom: Animalia
- Phylum: Chordata
- Class: Reptilia
- Order: Squamata
- Suborder: Serpentes
- Family: Colubridae
- Genus: Lycodon
- Species: L. aulicus

Binomial name
- Lycodon aulicus (Linnaeus, 1758)

Synonyms
- Coluber aulicus Linnaeus, 1758; Lycodon aulicus F. Boie, 1827

= Lycodon aulicus =

Species of snake

Lycodon aulicus, commonly known as the Indian wolf snake and the common wolf snake, is a species of nonvenomous snake in the subfamily Colubrinae of the family Colubridae. The species is native to South Asia and Southeast Asia. Early naturalists suggested its resemblance to the venomous common krait, an instance of Batesian mimicry.

== Description ==
The colouration of this snake is variable.

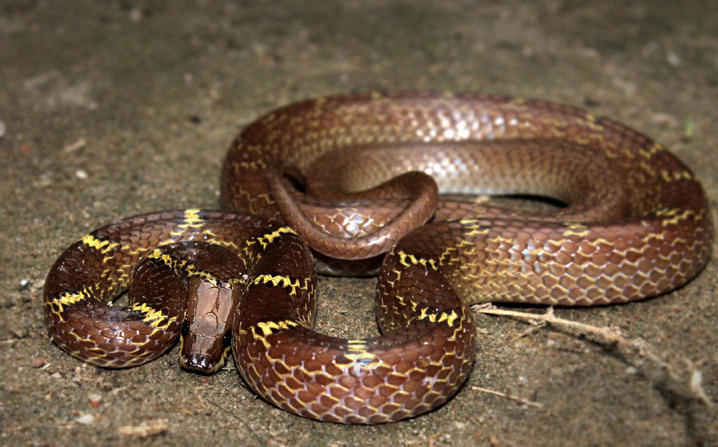
Indian wolf snake

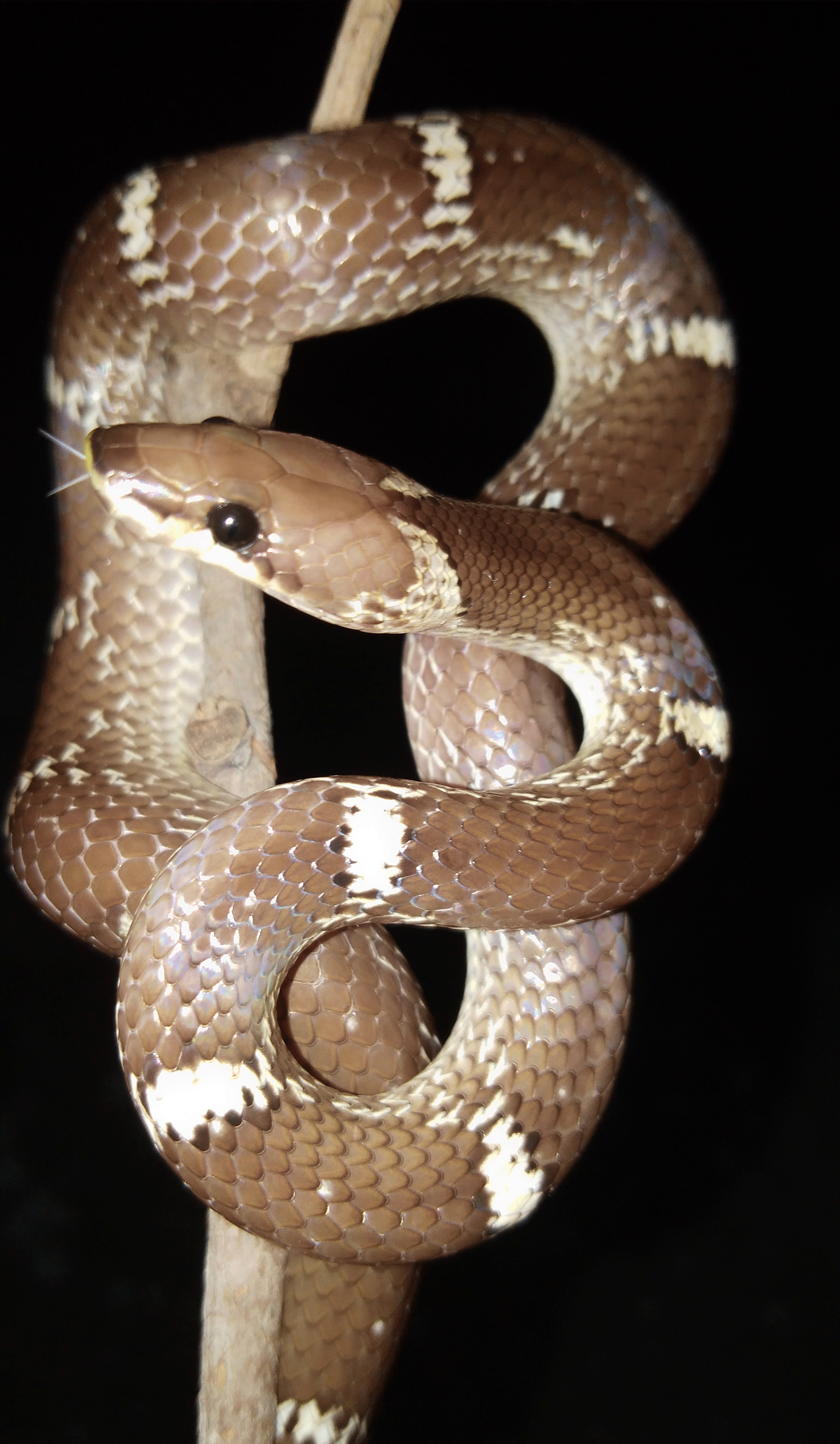
Indian wolf snake

This snake is often confused with the common krait. The presence of a loreal shield can be used to distinguish it from kraits.

The following is a description of various forms from Albert Günther's Reptiles of British India (1864).

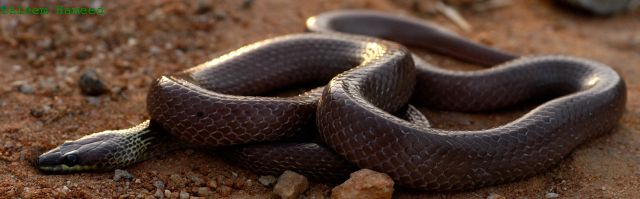
Indian wolf snake

Snout broad, much depressed, long, spatulate, with the upper lip swollen, and without canthus rostralis. Rostral shield very low, broad, slightly bent backwards on the upper surface of the snout; anterior frontals [= internasals] very small; posterior frontals [= prefrontals] longer than broad, much more so in adult specimens than in young ones; there is a lateral notch between the anterior and posterior frontals, in which the inner anterior angle of the loreal is received; the posterior frontals have an obtuse lateral angle corresponding to the suture between loreal and praeocular; occipitals elongate. Nostril small, directed upwards, between two nasals, the anterior of which is situated on the foremost part of the snout. Loreal single, large, nearly twice as long as broad. Praeocular single, in contact with the vertical [= frontal] and with the third labial; specimens in which it does not reach the vertical are very scarce. Two postoculars; supraciliary rather small. Nine upper labials, the third, fourth, and fifth of which enter the orbit. Temporals numerous, scale-like. Scales smooth, with a minute apical groove, in seventeen rows. Abdomen and tail with an angular ridge on each side. Ventrals 183-209; anal bifid, in a few specimens entire; subcaudals 57-77. Each maxillary is armed with two fangs in front, placed in a transverse line, the outer being much larger than the inner; the lateral longitudinal series of teeth commences at some distance from the fangs; they are small, from four to twelve in number, the last being considerably larger than the others; pterygoido-palatine teeth small, of equal size; mandible with two or three fangs on each side and with a series of small teeth.

Coloration variable.

- I. Continental varieties. The posterior frontals are moderately elongate-in young specimens nearly as broad as long. Each upper labial with a brown spot. [To this category belong also specimens from the Philippine Islands.]
  - Var. a. Uniform brown above, without collar: Malayan peninsula, Bengal, Madras.
  - Var. b. Uniform brown above, with a while collar: Madras.
  - Var. c. Brown or greyish brown, With indistinct traces of a white network, and with a white collar, more distinct in young specimens than in old ones: Coast of Malabar, Pinang, Malayan peninsula, Gamboja, Philippine Islands, Timor.
  - Var. d. Ferruginous or chestnut-brown, with white, brown-edged cross bars on the back, which are sometimes bifid on the sides, the branches of one band joining a branch of the preceding and following bands. The first band forms a collar; those on the hind part of the body gradually become indistinct. This variety is very common, and similar to, but specifically distinct from, the snake figured by Russell (i. pl. 16): we have received it from Pinang, Bengal, Nepal, Kangra (Himalayas), the Dekkan, and the Anamallay Mountains.
- II. Ceylonese varieties. The posterior frontals are much elongate, much longer than broad in every age. Upper labials while or shaded with brown.
  - Var. e. Uniform brownish grey above.
  - Var. f. Brown, with three or four broad, distant, white cross bands on the anterior half of the body; the anterior forms a collar, the others being broadest on the sides.
  - Var. g. Brown or greyish, with pure-while or reticulated while cross bands extending downwards to the belly, where they are broadest.

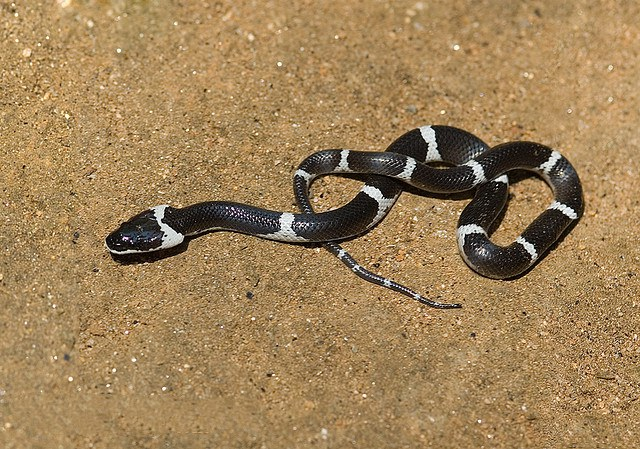
Another south Indian specimen (melanistic) from Sholayar reserve forests, Kerala.

The following description is from Boulenger's Fauna of British India, Reptilia and Batrachia volume (1890):

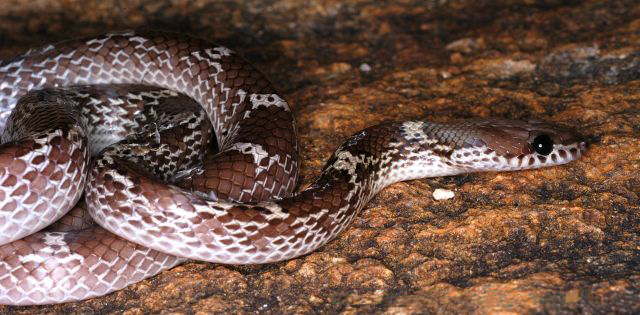

Snout much depressed, with swollen lips, spatulate in the adult; eye rather small. Rostral much broader than long, just visible from above: internasals much shorter than the prefrontals; frontal usually shorter than its distance from the end of the snout or than the parietals; loreal elongate, not entering the eye; one praeocular, usually in contact with the frontal; two postoculars; temporals small, scale-like, 2+3 or 3+3; 9 upper labials, third, fourth, and fifth entering the eye; 4 or 5 lower labials in contact with the anterior chin-shields, which are longer than the posterior. Scales smooth, in 17 rows. Ventrals 183-209, obtusely angulate laterally; anal divided; subcaudals 57-77, in two rows. Coloration variable; uniform brown above, or with white transverse bands, or with white reticulation; upper lip uniform white, or with brown spots; lower parts uniform white.

Total length 71 cm (28 in); tail 11 cm (4.3 in).

Habitat: India and Ceylon, Himalayas, Burma, Siam, Malay Peninsula, Java, Philippines, Timor. A common snake in India.

== Scalation ==
The rostral touches six shields. The frontal touches the parietals, supraoculars, prefrontals and preoculars. The supraoculars are small. The parietals are one and a half times the size of the frontal. The preoculars are entire, while the postoculars and temporals are divided into two shields. There are nine supralabials, with the 3rd, 4th, and 5th touching the eye. The ventrals are 170 to 224 in number. The anal shield is divided. The subcaudals are 56 to 80 and are divided.

== Distribution ==
Lycodon aulicus is found in Pakistan, Sri Lanka, India (north to Himalayas and Assam; Maharashtra, Gujarat), Bangladesh, Nepal, Myanmar (= Burma), Maldives. It is one of the most common snakes of India and Ceylon, but becomes scarcer on the coasts of the southeastern parts of India.

== Behaviour ==
The Indian wolf snake is nocturnal and is inactive in the day. It is of fierce habits and defends itself vigorously, however it is nonvenomous. It is known to defend itself when barred of escape, and can cause severe lacerations with its fine sharp "fangs". It may also feign death to lure in potential prey and to avoid being chased by predators.

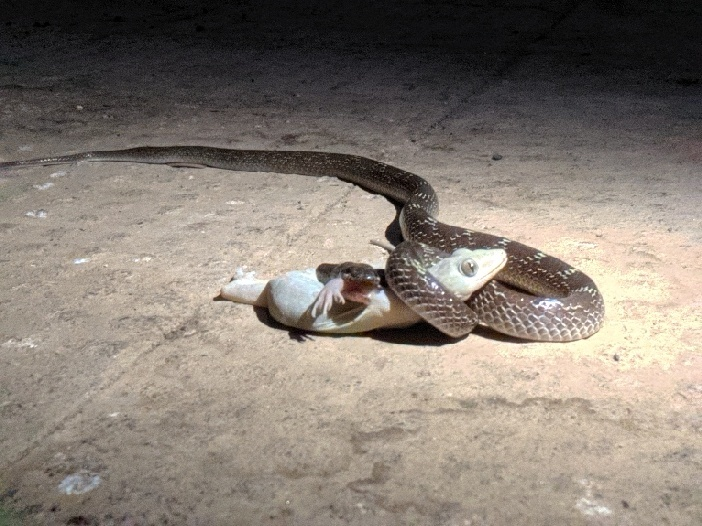
Eating a northern house gecko

== Diet ==
Lycodon aulicus feeds on lizards and frogs. According to Günther (1864) it is one of the most formidable enemies of the skinks, which form almost its sole food, the "fangs" in the front of its jaws being adapted for piercing and making good its hold on the hard smooth scales with which those lizards are coated.

== Reproduction ==
Females may be larger than males. They breed prior to the monsoons and lay 5-7 eggs.

The eggs hatch in September or October, and the hatchlings are 14–19 cm (5.5–7.5 in) long.
