= Nusoncus =

Scientific classification
- Kingdom: Animalia
- Phylum: Arthropoda
- Subphylum: Chelicerata
- Class: Arachnida
- Order: Araneae
- Infraorder: Araneomorphae
- Family: Linyphiidae
- Genus: Nusoncus; Wunderlich, 2008
- Species: N. nasutus

Binomial name
- Nusoncus nasutus (Schenkel, 1925)

Genus of spiders

Nusoncus is a monotypic genus of dwarf spiders containing the single species, Nusoncus nasutus. The genus was described by J. Wunderlich in 2008. It is considered new to the fauna of Latvia since 2009.
