= Janetschekia =

Scientific classification
- Kingdom: Animalia
- Phylum: Arthropoda
- Subphylum: Chelicerata
- Class: Arachnida
- Order: Araneae
- Infraorder: Araneomorphae
- Family: Linyphiidae
- Genus: Janetschekia; Schenkel, 1939

Type species
- J. monodon (O. Pickard-Cambridge, 1873)

Species
- J. monodon (O. Pickard-Cambridge, 1873) – Switzerland, Germany, Austria, Italy, Albania; J. necessaria Tanasevitch, 1985 – Central Asia

Genus of spiders

Janetschekia is a genus of dwarf spiders that was first described by E. Schenkel in 1939. As of May 2019 it contains only two species, both found in Albania, Austria, Germany, Italy, and Switzerland: J. monodon and J. necessaria.
