= Frontiphantes =

Scientific classification
- Kingdom: Animalia
- Phylum: Arthropoda
- Subphylum: Chelicerata
- Class: Arachnida
- Order: Araneae
- Infraorder: Araneomorphae
- Family: Linyphiidae
- Genus: Frontiphantes; Wunderlich, 1987
- Species: F. fulgurenotatus

Binomial name
- Frontiphantes fulgurenotatus (Schenkel, 1938)

Genus of spiders

Frontiphantes is a monotypic genus of European dwarf spiders containing the single species, Frontiphantes fulgurenotatus. It was first described by J. Wunderlich in 1987, and has only been found in Portugal.
