= Metopobactrus =

Scientific classification
- Kingdom: Animalia
- Phylum: Arthropoda
- Subphylum: Chelicerata
- Class: Arachnida
- Order: Araneae
- Infraorder: Araneomorphae
- Family: Linyphiidae
- Genus: Metopobactrus; Simon, 1884

Type species
- M. falcifrons Simon, 1884

Species
- 11, see text

Genus of spiders

Metopobactrus is a genus of dwarf spiders that was first described by Eugène Louis Simon in 1884.

== Species ==
As of May 2021 it contains eleven species:

- Metopobactrus ascitus (Kulczyński, 1894) – Eastern Europe
- Metopobactrus cavernicola Wunderlich, 1992 – Canary Is.
- Metopobactrus cornis Seo, 2018 – Korea
- Metopobactrus deserticola Loksa, 1981 – Slovakia, Hungary
- Metopobactrus falcifrons Simon, 1884 (type) – France, Spain
- Metopobactrus nadigi Thaler, 1976 – Switzerland, Austria, Italy
- Metopobactrus nodicornis Schenkel, 1927 – Switzerland, Austria
- Metopobactrus orbelicus Deltshev, 1985 – Bulgaria
- Metopobactrus pacificus Emerton, 1923 – USA
- Metopobactrus prominulus (O. Pickard-Cambridge, 1873) – Canada, Europe, Turkey, Caucasus, Russia (Europe to Far East), Japan
- Metopobactrus verticalis (Simon, 1881) – France, Corsica, Italy
