= Tchatkalophantes =

Scientific classification
- Kingdom: Animalia
- Phylum: Arthropoda
- Subphylum: Chelicerata
- Class: Arachnida
- Order: Araneae
- Infraorder: Araneomorphae
- Family: Linyphiidae
- Genus: Tchatkalophantes; Tanasevitch, 2001

Type species
- T. tchatkalensis (Tanasevitch, 1983)

Species
- 10, see text

Genus of spiders

Tchatkalophantes is a genus of sheet weavers that was first described by A. V. Tanasevitch in 2001.

== Species ==
As of May 2019 it contains ten species, found in Asia:

- Tchatkalophantes baltistan Tanasevitch, 2011 – Pakistan
- Tchatkalophantes bonneti (Schenkel, 1963) – China
- Tchatkalophantes huangyuanensis (Zhu & Li, 1983) – China
- Tchatkalophantes hyperauritus (Loksa, 1965) – Mongolia
- Tchatkalophantes karatau Tanasevitch, 2001 – Kazakhstan
- Tchatkalophantes kungei Tanasevitch, 2001 – Kyrgyzstan
- Tchatkalophantes mongolicus Tanasevitch, 2001 – Mongolia
- Tchatkalophantes rupeus (Tanasevitch, 1986) – Kazakhstan
- Tchatkalophantes tarabaevi Tanasevitch, 2001 – Kazakhstan
- Tchatkalophantes tchatkalensis (Tanasevitch, 1983) (type) – Central Asia
