= Qattara (disambiguation) =

Qattara may refer to:

- Qattara Depression, Libyan Desert basin in north-western Egypt
- Qattara Gecko, species of lizard
- Qattara Oasis within the UAE city of Al Ain
- il-Qattara locality in Rabat, Malta
- Qattara (or:Karana), an ancient city in northern Iraq, in Ninawa (Nineveh) province, in Sinjar region, modern day name: Tell al-Rimah
