= Hemidactylus mandebensis =

Scientific classification
- Domain: Eukaryota
- Kingdom: Animalia
- Phylum: Chordata
- Class: Reptilia
- Order: Squamata
- Infraorder: Gekkota
- Family: Gekkonidae
- Genus: Hemidactylus
- Species: H. mandebensis

Binomial name
- Hemidactylus mandebensis Šmíd et al., 2015

Species of lizard

Hemidactylus mandebensis is a species of house gecko from Yemen. It grows to 42 mm (1.7 in) in snout–vent length. It is a relatively small-sized member of the Hemidactylus robustus species group.

== Etymology ==
The specific name mandebensis refers to Bab-el-Mandeb strait, close to which the species is found.

== Distribution and habitat ==
This species is known from two nearby localities in the mountainous southwestern Yemen at elevations of 1,182–1,253 m (3,878–4,111 ft) above sea level. The specimens were observed at night climbing rock faces by irrigated fields. They were found in sympatry with several other gecko species from the genera Hemidactylus, Ptyodactylus, and Pristurus.
