= Mesalina ercolinii =

Conservation status
- Data Deficient (IUCN 3.1)

Scientific classification
- Kingdom: Animalia
- Phylum: Chordata
- Class: Reptilia
- Order: Squamata
- Family: Lacertidae
- Genus: Mesalina
- Species: M. ercolinii

Binomial name
- Mesalina ercolinii (Lanza & Poggesi, 1975)

Synonyms
- Eremias ercolinii Lanza & Poggesi, 1975; Mesalina ercolinii — Arnold et al., 1998

Species of lizard

Mesalina ercolinii is a species of sand-dwelling lizard in the family Lacertidae. The species is endemic to Somalia.

== Etymology ==
The specific name, ercolinii, is in honor of Italian ichthyologist Antonio Ercolini.

== Description ==
M. ercolinii is rather large, and is short-legged. The holotype, an adult female, has a snout-to-vent length (SVL) of 6.6 cm (2.6 in).

== Reproduction ==
M. ercolinii is oviparous.
