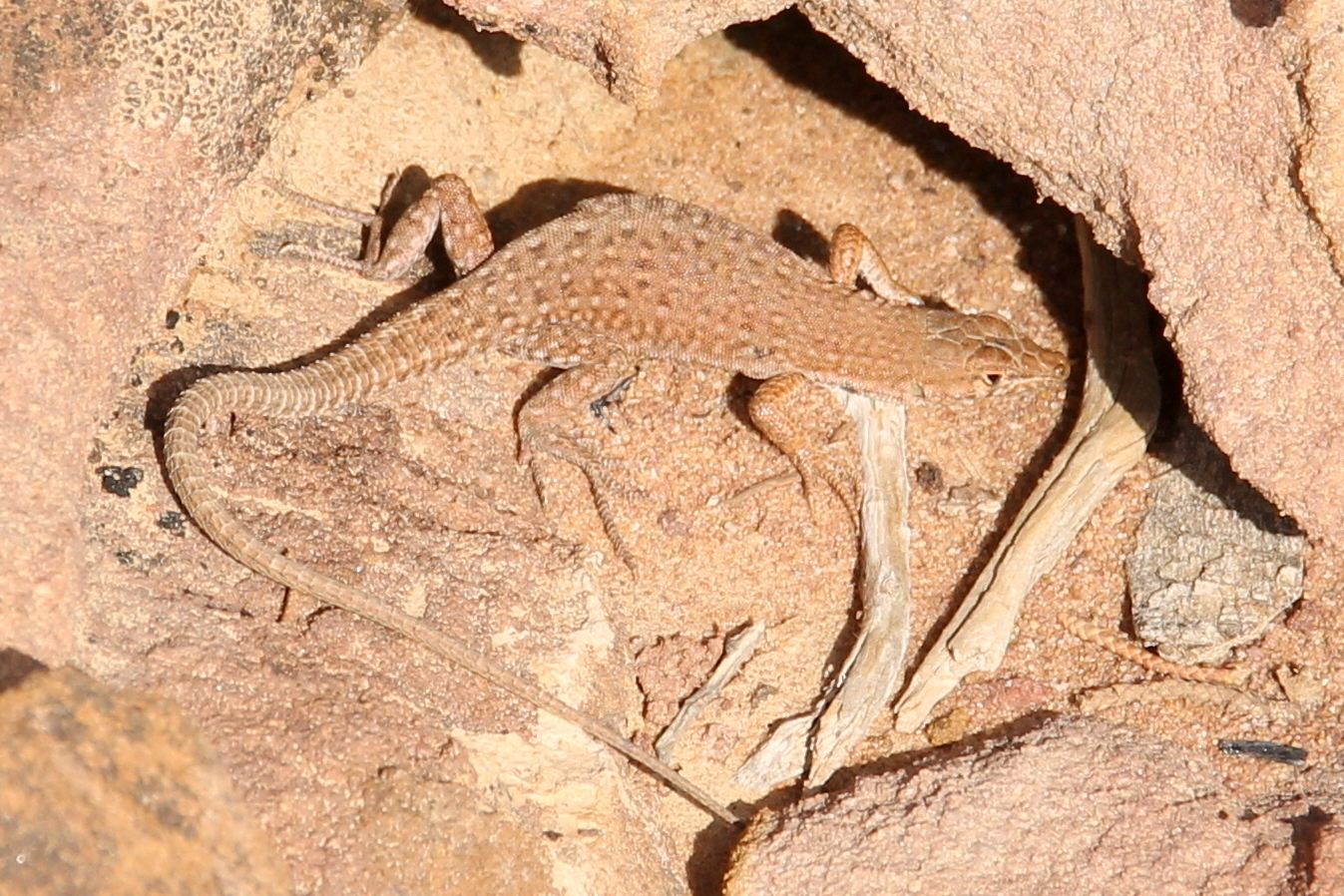

Conservation status
- Least Concern (IUCN 3.1)

Scientific classification
- Kingdom: Animalia
- Phylum: Chordata
- Class: Reptilia
- Order: Squamata
- Family: Lacertidae
- Genus: Mesalina
- Species: M. bahaeldini

Binomial name
- Mesalina bahaeldini Segoli, Cohen & Y. Werner, 2002

= Mesalina bahaeldini =

Species of lizard

Mesalina bahaeldini is a species of lizard in the family Lacertidae. The species is found in Sinai, Israel, Jordan, and northwestern Saudi Arabia.

== Etymology ==
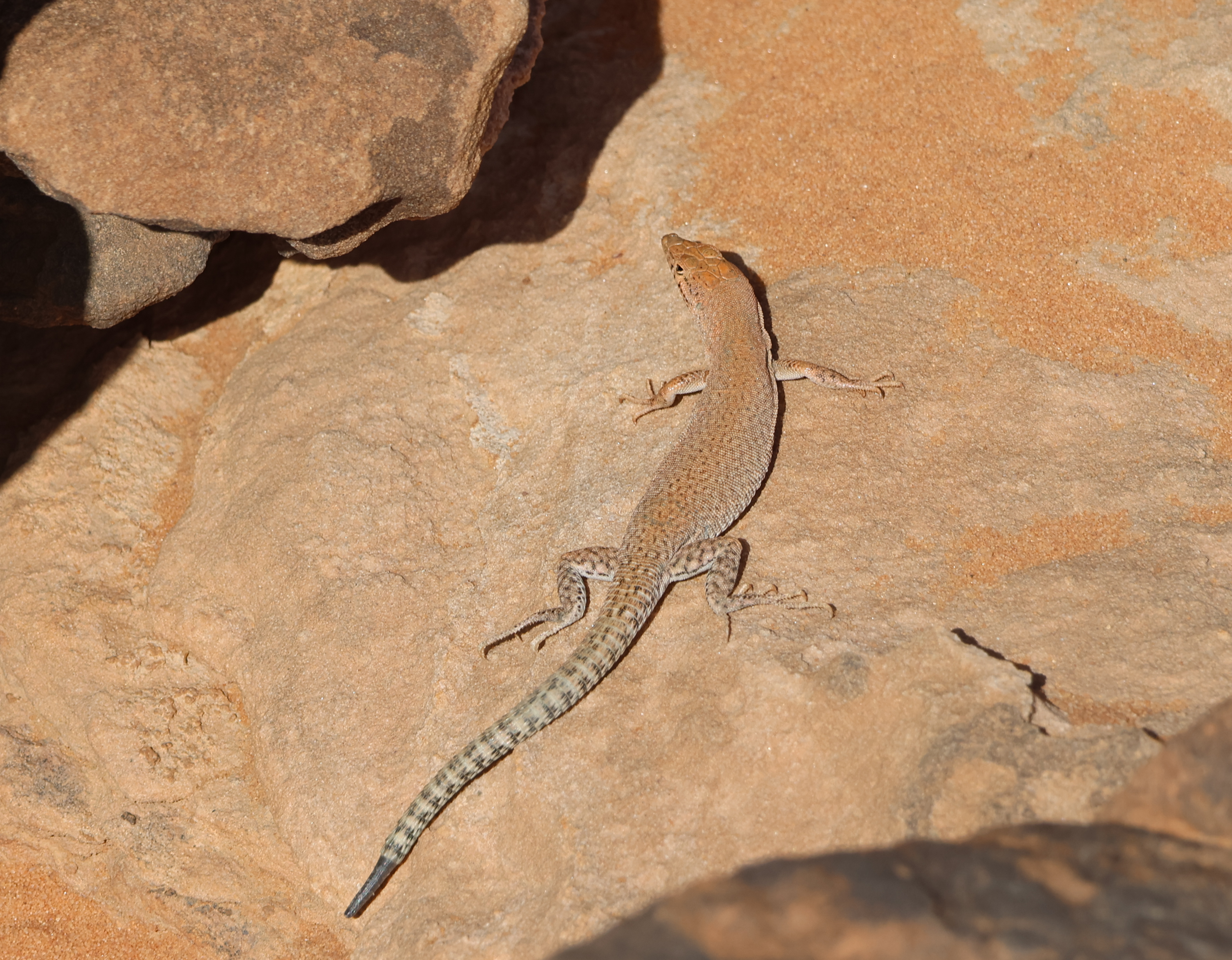
Mesalina bahaeldini from North Western Saudi Arabia

The specific name, bahaeldini, is in honor of Egyptian zoologist Sherif M. Baha El Din, who is the husband of the late American-born herpetologist Mindy Baha El Din.

== Habitat ==
The natural habitat of M. bahaeldini is rocky areas.

== Reproduction ==
M. bahaeldini is oviparous.

== Conservation status ==
M. bahaeldini is threatened by habitat loss.

== Subspecies ==
Two subspecies are recognized as being valid, including the nominotypical subspecies.

- Mesalina bahaeldini bahaeldini Segoli, Cohen & Y. Werner, 2002
- Mesalina bahaeldini curatorum Y. Werner & Ashkenazi, 2010
