= Mesalina austroarabica =

Scientific classification
- Kingdom: Animalia
- Phylum: Chordata
- Class: Reptilia
- Order: Squamata
- Family: Lacertidae
- Genus: Mesalina
- Species: M. austroarabica

Binomial name
- Mesalina austroarabica Sindaco, Simo-Riudalbas, Sacchi, & Carranza, 2018

Species of lizard

Mesalina austroarabica is a species of sand-dwelling lizard in the family Lacertidae. It is endemic to Oman.
