= Mesalina simoni =

Conservation status
- Least Concern (IUCN 3.1)

Scientific classification
- Kingdom: Animalia
- Phylum: Chordata
- Class: Reptilia
- Order: Squamata
- Family: Lacertidae
- Genus: Mesalina
- Species: M. simoni

Binomial name
- Mesalina simoni (Boettger, 1881)

Synonyms
- Podarces (Mesalina) simoni Boettger, 1881; Eremias olivieri simoni — Bons, 1959; Mesalina simoni — Arnold, 1986

Species of lizard

Mesalina simoni, known commonly as Simon's desert racer, is a species of lizard in the family Lacertidae. The species is endemic to Morocco.

== Etymology ==
The specific name, simoni, is in honor of Hans Simon who was a German collector of natural history specimens.

== Geographic range ==
In Morocco M. simoni is found on the central coast of the Atlantic Ocean.

== Habitat ==
The natural habitat of M. simoni is rocky areas.

== Reproduction ==
M. simoni is oviparous.
