= Mesalina adrarensis =

Scientific classification
- Kingdom: Animalia
- Phylum: Chordata
- Class: Reptilia
- Order: Squamata
- Family: Lacertidae
- Genus: Mesalina
- Species: M. adrarensis

Binomial name
- Mesalina adrarensis Pizzigalli, Crochet, Geniez, Martínez-Freiría, Velo-Antón, & Brito, 2021

Species of lizard

Mesalina adrarensis is a species of sand-dwelling lizard in the family Lacertidae. The species is endemic to Mauritania.
