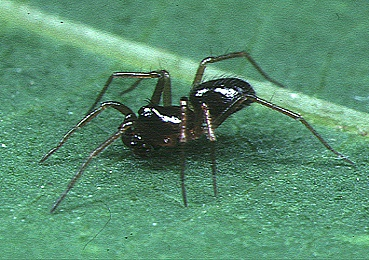
- G. onoi, male

Scientific classification
- Kingdom: Animalia
- Phylum: Arthropoda
- Subphylum: Chelicerata
- Class: Arachnida
- Order: Araneae
- Infraorder: Araneomorphae
- Family: Linyphiidae
- Genus: Gongylidioides; Oi, 1960

Type species
- G. cucullatus Oi, 1960

Species
- 18, see text

= Gongylidioides =

Genus of spiders

Gongylidioides is a genus of Asian dwarf spiders that was first described by R. Oi in 1960.

== Species ==
As of May 2019 it contains eighteen species, found in China, India, Japan, Korea, Malaysia, Russia, Taiwan, and Vietnam:

- Gongylidioides acmodontus Tu & Li, 2006 – China
- Gongylidioides angustus Tu & Li, 2006 – Taiwan
- Gongylidioides communis Saito & Ono, 2001 – Japan
- Gongylidioides cucullatus Oi, 1960 (type) – Japan
- Gongylidioides diellipticus Song & Li, 2008 – Taiwan
- Gongylidioides foratus (Ma & Zhu, 1990) – China
- Gongylidioides galeritus Saito & Ono, 2001 – Japan
- Gongylidioides griseolineatus (Schenkel, 1936) – Russia (Far East), China
- Gongylidioides kaihotsui Saito & Ono, 2001 – Japan, Korea
- Gongylidioides keralaensis Tanasevitch, 2011 – India
- Gongylidioides kouqianensis Tu & Li, 2006 – China
- Gongylidioides lagenoscapis Yin, 2012 – China
- Gongylidioides monocornis Saito & Ono, 2001 – Japan
- Gongylidioides onoi Tazoe, 1994 – China, Vietnam, Japan
- Gongylidioides pectinatus Tanasevitch, 2011 – India, Malaysia
- Gongylidioides protegulus Tanasevitch & Marusik, 2019 – Taiwan
- Gongylidioides rimatus (Ma & Zhu, 1990) – Russia (Far East), China
- Gongylidioides ussuricus Eskov, 1992 – Russia (Far East), China, Korea
