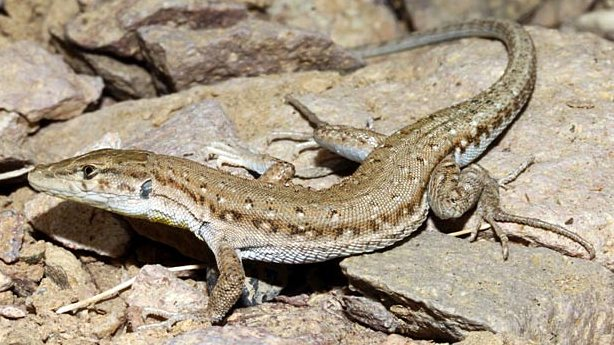

Scientific classification
- Kingdom: Animalia
- Phylum: Chordata
- Class: Reptilia
- Order: Squamata
- Family: Lacertidae
- Genus: Mesalina
- Species: M. watsonana

Binomial name
- Mesalina watsonana (Stoliczka, 1872)

Synonyms
- Eremias (Mesalina) watsonana Stoliczka, 1872; Mesalina watsonana — Murray, 1884; Eremias guttulata watsonana — M.A. Smith, 1935; Mesalina guttulata watsonana — Nilson & Andrén, 1981; Mesalina watsonana — Bischoff, 1995

= Mesalina watsonana =

Species of reptile

Mesalina watsonana, commonly known as the Persian long-tailed desert lizard, is a species of sand-dwelling lizard in the family Lacertidae. The species is endemic to Asia.

== Etymology ==
The specific name, watsonana, is in honor of "Mr. H. E. Watson" who was a civil officer in Pakistan.

== Geographic range ==
Mesalina watsonana occurs in, from west to east, Iran, Turkmenistan, Afghanistan, Pakistan, and India.

== Reproduction ==
Mesalina watsonana is oviparous.
