= Wiehlenarius boreus =

Scientific classification
- Kingdom: Animalia
- Phylum: Arthropoda
- Subphylum: Chelicerata
- Class: Arachnida
- Order: Araneae
- Infraorder: Araneomorphae
- Family: Linyphiidae
- Genus: Wiehlenarius
- Species: W. boreus

Binomial name
- Wiehlenarius boreus Eskov, 1990

Species of spider

Wiehlenarius boreus is a species of Araneomorph spider in the Linyphiidae family.

The species is endemic to Russia. It is known from Siberia.
