= Rhynchocalamus levitoni =

Scientific classification
- Kingdom: Animalia
- Phylum: Chordata
- Class: Reptilia
- Order: Squamata
- Suborder: Serpentes
- Family: Colubridae
- Genus: Rhynchocalamus
- Species: R. levitoni

Binomial name
- Rhynchocalamus levitoni Torki, 2017

Species of snake

Rhynchocalamus levitoni is a species of snake of the family Colubridae.

The snake is found in Iran.
