= Rhynchocalamus dayanae =

Scientific classification
- Kingdom: Animalia
- Phylum: Chordata
- Class: Reptilia
- Order: Squamata
- Suborder: Serpentes
- Family: Colubridae
- Genus: Rhynchocalamus
- Species: R. dayanae

Binomial name
- Rhynchocalamus dayanae Tamar, Šmíd, Göçmen, Meiri, & Carranza, 2016

Species of snake

Rhynchocalamus dayanae, commonly known as Dayan's kukri snake, belongs to the family Colubridae. The snake is endemic to the Negev Mountains in Israel. It was named in honor of the Israeli zoologist, Tamar Dayan.
