= Rhynchocalamus arabicus =

Conservation status
- Data Deficient (IUCN 3.1)

Scientific classification
- Kingdom: Animalia
- Phylum: Chordata
- Class: Reptilia
- Order: Squamata
- Suborder: Serpentes
- Family: Colubridae
- Genus: Rhynchocalamus
- Species: R. arabicus

Binomial name
- Rhynchocalamus arabicus (Schmidt, 1933

Species of snake

Rhynchocalamus arabicus, the Aden kukri snake, is a species of snake of the family Colubridae.

The snake is found in Yemen and Oman.
