= Mesalina bernoullii =

Scientific classification
- Kingdom: Animalia
- Phylum: Chordata
- Class: Reptilia
- Order: Squamata
- Family: Lacertidae
- Genus: Mesalina
- Species: M. bernoullii

Binomial name
- Mesalina bernoullii (Schenkel-Haas, 1901)

Synonyms
- Eremias bernoullii Schenkel, 1901; Mesalina bernoullii — Šmíd et al., 2017

Species of lizard

Mesalina bernoullii, also known commonly as Bernoulli's short-nosed desert lizard, is a species of sand-dwelling lizard in the family Lacertidae. The species is endemic to the Middle East.

== Etymology ==
The specific name, bernoullii, is in honor of architect W. Bernoulli.

== Geographic range ==
M. bernoullii occurs in Egypt, Iran, Iraq, Israel, Jordan, Saudi Arabia, and Syria.

== Reproduction ==
M. bernoullii is oviparous.
