= Mesalina kuri =

Conservation status
- Least Concern (IUCN 3.1)

Scientific classification
- Kingdom: Animalia
- Phylum: Chordata
- Class: Reptilia
- Order: Squamata
- Family: Lacertidae
- Genus: Mesalina
- Species: M. kuri

Binomial name
- Mesalina kuri Joger & Mayer, 2002

Species of lizard

Mesalina kuri is a species of sand-dwelling lizard in the family Lacertidae. The species is endemic to the island of Abd al Kuri in the Socotra Archipelago of Yemen.
