= Mesalina balfouri =

Conservation status
- Least Concern (IUCN 3.1)

Scientific classification
- Kingdom: Animalia
- Phylum: Chordata
- Class: Reptilia
- Order: Squamata
- Family: Lacertidae
- Genus: Mesalina
- Species: M. balfouri

Binomial name
- Mesalina balfouri (Blanford, 1881)

Synonyms
- Eremias (Mesalina) balfouri Blanford, 1881; Eremias guttulata balfouri — Neumann, 1905; Mesalina olivieri balfouri — Haas, 1951; Mesalina balfouri — Arnold, 1986

Species of lizard

Mesalina balfouri is a species of sand-dwelling lizard in the family Lacertidae. The species is endemic to Socotra.

== Etymology ==
The specific name, balfouri, is in honor of Scottish botanist Isaac Bayley Balfour.

== Habitat ==
The preferred habitats of M. balfouri are rocky areas and shrubland at altitudes of 0–1,045 m (0–3,428 ft).

== Reproduction ==
M. balfouri is oviparous.
