= Mesalina microlepis =

Scientific classification
- Domain: Eukaryota
- Kingdom: Animalia
- Phylum: Chordata
- Class: Reptilia
- Order: Squamata
- Family: Lacertidae
- Genus: Mesalina
- Species: M. microlepis

Binomial name
- Mesalina microlepis (Angel, 1936)

Species of lizard

Mesalina microlepis, also known as the small-scaled desert lizard, is a species of sand-dwelling lizard in the family Lacertidae. It occurs in Syria, Lebanon, Egypt, Israel, Jordan, Iraq, and Iran.
