= Mesalina ayunensis =

Conservation status
- Data Deficient (IUCN 3.1)

Scientific classification
- Kingdom: Animalia
- Phylum: Chordata
- Class: Reptilia
- Order: Squamata
- Family: Lacertidae
- Genus: Mesalina
- Species: M. ayunensis

Binomial name
- Mesalina ayunensis Arnold, 1980

Species of lizard

Mesalina ayunensis, also known as the Ayun sand lizard or Arnold's sand lizard, is a species of sand-dwelling lizard in the family Lacertidae. It is endemic to Oman.
