= Mesalina arnoldi =

Scientific classification
- Kingdom: Animalia
- Phylum: Chordata
- Class: Reptilia
- Order: Squamata
- Family: Lacertidae
- Genus: Mesalina
- Species: M. arnoldi

Binomial name
- Mesalina arnoldi Sindaco, Simó-Riudalbas, Sacchi & Carranza, 2018

Species of lizard

Mesalina arnoldi is a species of sand-dwelling lizard in the family Lacertidae. The species is endemic to Yemen.

== Etymology ==
The specific name, arnoldi, is in honor of British herpetologist E. Nicholas "Nick" Arnold.

== Habitat ==
The preferred habitat of M. arnoldi is sparsely-vegetated rocky plateaus at elevations of 1,300–2,800 m (4,300–9,200 ft).
