= Mesalina saudiarabica =

Scientific classification
- Kingdom: Animalia
- Phylum: Chordata
- Class: Reptilia
- Order: Squamata
- Family: Lacertidae
- Genus: Mesalina
- Species: M. saudiarabica

Binomial name
- Mesalina saudiarabica Moravec, Šmíd, Schmitz, Shobrak & Wilms, 2017

Species of lizard

Mesalina saudiarabica is a species of sand-dwelling lizard in the family Lacertidae. The species is endemic to Saudi Arabia.
