= Hemidactylus foudaii =

Conservation status
- Least Concern (IUCN 3.1)

Scientific classification
- Kingdom: Animalia
- Phylum: Chordata
- Class: Reptilia
- Order: Squamata
- Suborder: Gekkota
- Family: Gekkonidae
- Genus: Hemidactylus
- Species: H. foudaii

Binomial name
- Hemidactylus foudaii S. Baha El Din, 2003

Species of lizard

Hemidactylus foudaii, also known commonly as the Elba gecko, is a species of lizard in the family Gekkonidae. The species is native to North Africa.

== Etymology ==
The specific name, foudaii, is in honor of Egyptian conservationist Moustafa Mokhtar Fouda.

== Geographic range ==
H. foudaii is found in Egypt and possibly Sudan.

== Habitat ==
The natural habitats of H. foudaii are dry savanna, subtropical or tropical dry shrubland, and rocky areas, at altitudes up to 450 m (1,480 ft).

== Reproduction ==
H. foudaii is oviparous.

== Conservation status ==
H. foudaii is threatened by habitat loss.
