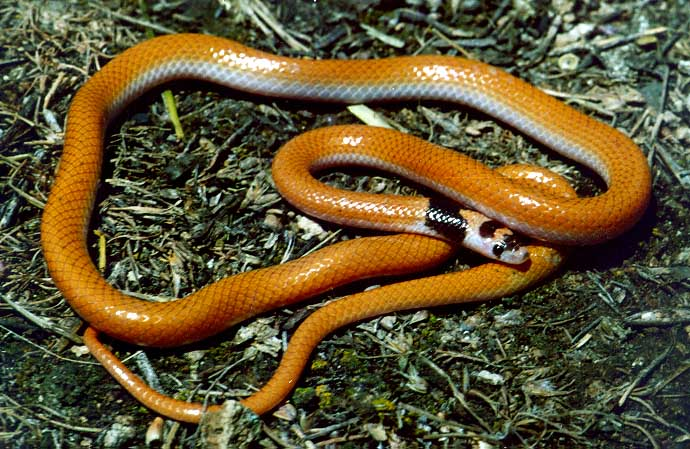
- Adult from Armenia

Scientific classification
- Kingdom: Animalia
- Phylum: Chordata
- Class: Reptilia
- Order: Squamata
- Suborder: Serpentes
- Family: Colubridae
- Genus: Rhynchocalamus
- Species: R. satunini

Binomial name
- Rhynchocalamus satunini (Nikolsky, 1899)

= Rhynchocalamus satunini =

Species of snake

Rhynchocalamus satunini, the Palestine kukri snake, is a species of snake of the family Colubridae.

The snake is found in Turkey, Armenia, Iraq, Iran, and Azerbaijan.
