= Hadramaut sand lizard =

Conservation status
- Least Concern (IUCN 3.1)

Scientific classification
- Kingdom: Animalia
- Phylum: Chordata
- Class: Reptilia
- Order: Squamata
- Suborder: Lacertoidea
- Family: Lacertidae
- Genus: Mesalina
- Species: M. adramitana

Binomial name
- Mesalina adramitana (Boulenger, 1917)

Species of lizard

Hadramaut sand lizard (Mesalina adramitana), is a species of sand-dwelling lizard in the genus Mesalina. The origin of this species is estimated to be around 8 Mya and receives its name from its type locality, the Hadramaut region.

== Distribution/Habitat ==
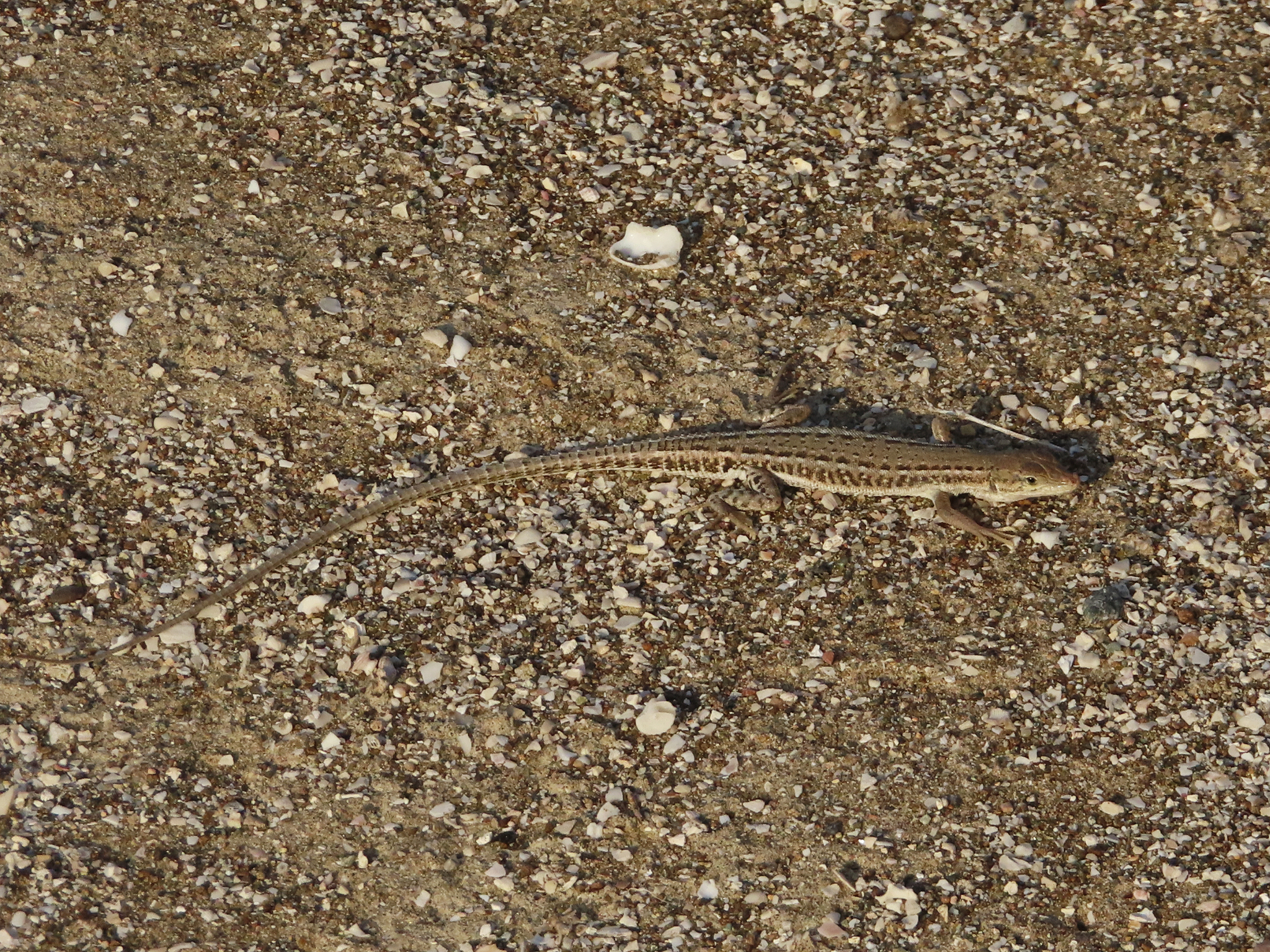
Hadramaut Sand Lizard from Kalba, Sharjah, United Arab Emirates

Mesalina adramitana can be found distributed through the Southern Arabian Peninsula, Qatar, Yemen, Oman, United Arab Emirates, and Saudi Arabia. Populations have been recorded from both gravel plains, but also in flat desert plains; that lack vegetation. Evidence confirms there are two distinct lineages of M. adramitana referred to as South and North. While these two lineages prefer similar habitats M. adramitana differ in their temperature preference. Mesalina adramitana South tolerates lower temperatures and occupies areas with lower precipitation compared to M. adramitana North, occurring in warmer areas with a preference for higher precipitation levels.

== Biogeography ==
Mesalina adramitana has five distinct lineages with two divergent sister lineages that have adapted to differing environmental and climatic conditions in their own regions. Mesalina adramitana South appears to have no apparent barriers to dispersal, as all of southern Oman is suitible for M. adramitana lineages, leading to the association with the isolation-by-distance model. The M. adramitana North lineage is surrounded by unsuitable habitat (The Hajar Mountains of northern Oman), that presents a barrier to dispersal and therefore restricts gene flow.

== Ecology ==
=== Diet ===
Mesalina adramitana has a diet that consists of insects with ants being the main prey. Mesalina adramitana hunt during the daylight hours and have been observed feeding during the early evening under road lighting. Mesalina adramitana have been observed to be prey for shrikes as this species has been found impaled on palm trees, which, indicates shrike predation.

=== Reproduction ===
Mesalina adramitana are oviparous, meaning they lay eggs rather than live babies.

== Phenotype ==
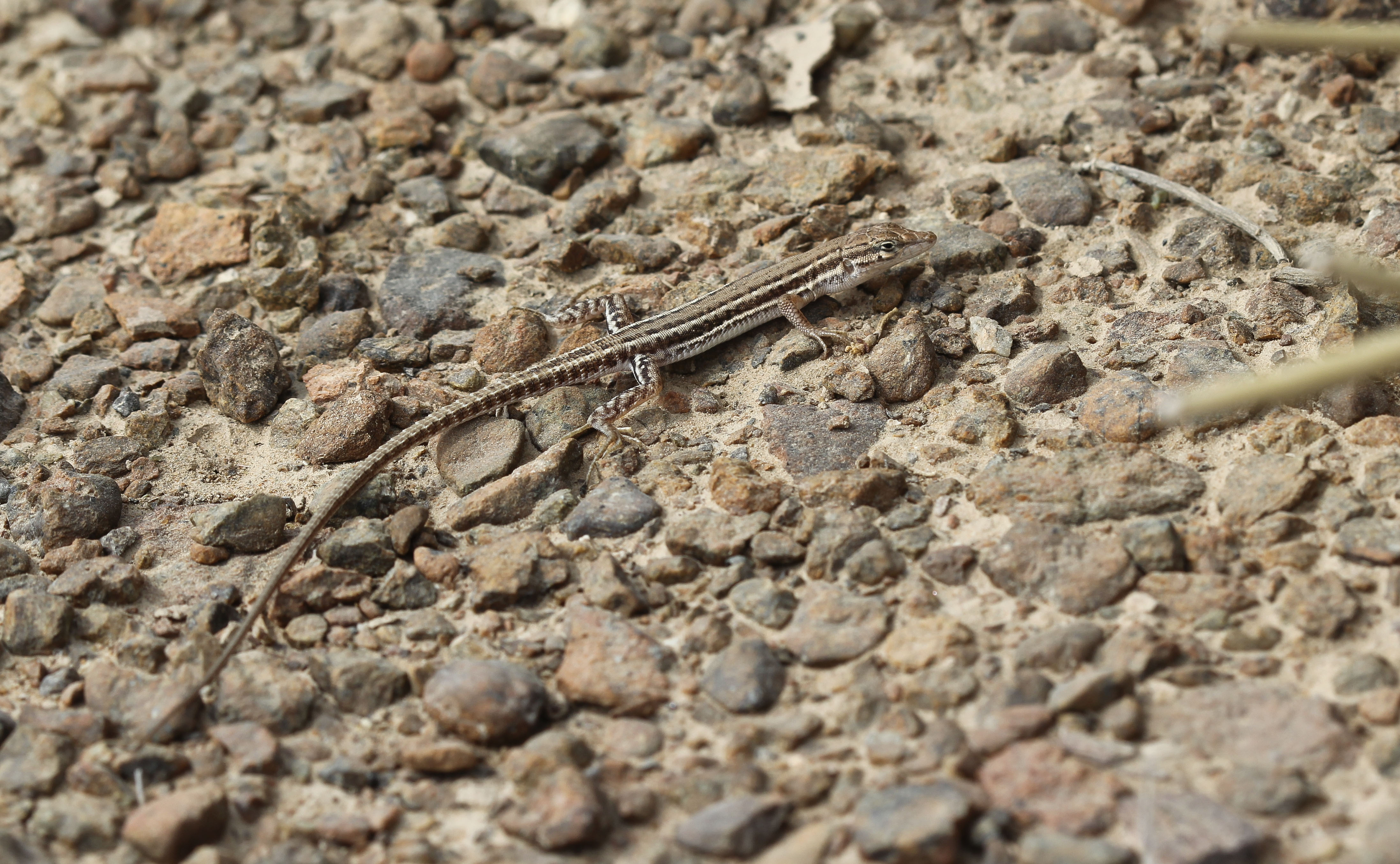
Mesalina adramitana from Fujiarah, United Arab Emirates

Morphological differentiation and color variations occur among distinct populations of M. adramitana. Mesalina adramitana is distinguished by an unmarked center along the back bordered by dotted lines on either side. Below the dotted line is a lighter stripe and then a dark strip along the sides and then a cream-colored underbelly. While this pattern can vary, M. adramitana always tend to have dark sides with light spots. Scales are smooth along the surface of the lower leg. Adult snout length ranges from 42 mm to 46 mm.

== Conservation ==
Mesalina adramitana in 2012 was assessed by the IUCN Red List of Threatened Species where it was listed as least concern due to the lack of outstanding threats and the species large range. Mesalina adramitana occurs in at least one protected area where in-place land/water protection are prevalent but there has ultimately been a continuous decline in area, extent and/or quality of habitat. Oman has 22 areas dispersed through the country established for the protection and conservation of species. Many areas within the Hajar Mountains and throughout the rest of Oman remain unprotected with 3.91% of the country having no coverage for protected areas.
