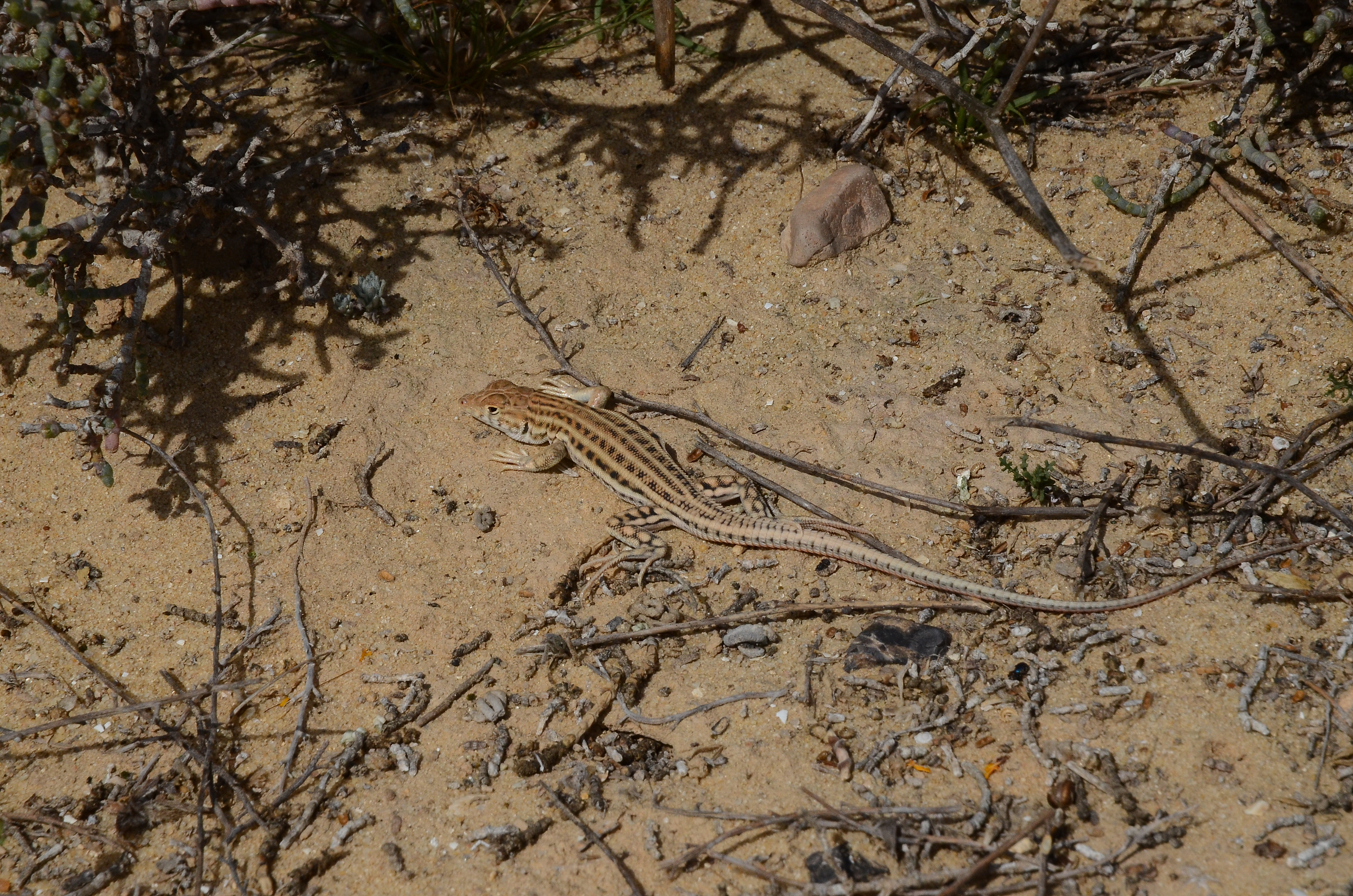

Conservation status
- Least Concern (IUCN 3.1)

Scientific classification
- Kingdom: Animalia
- Phylum: Chordata
- Class: Reptilia
- Order: Squamata
- Family: Lacertidae
- Genus: Mesalina
- Species: M. olivieri

Binomial name
- Mesalina olivieri (Audouin, 1829)

Synonyms
- Lacerta olivieri Audouin, 1829; Eremias guttulata olivieri — Boulenger, 1921; Eremias olivieri — Papenfuss, 1969; Mesalina olivieri — Szczerbak, 1975

= Mesalina olivieri =

Species of lizard

Mesalina olivieri, also known commonly as Olivier's sand lizard, is a species of sand-dwelling lizard in the family Lacertidae. The species is native to North Africa and the Middle East.

== Etymology ==
The specific name, olivieri, is in honor of French entomologist Guillaume-Antoine Olivier.

== Geographic distribution ==
Mesalina olivieri occurs in Algeria, Egypt, Iraq, Israel, Jordan, Libya, Morocco, Saudi Arabia, Tunisia, and Western Sahara.

== Habitat ==
The preferred natural habitats of Mesalina olivieri are desert, grassland, and shrubland at altitudes of 0–1,000 m (0–3,281 ft).

== Behavior ==
Mesalina olivieri is terrestrial and diurnal.

== Diet ==
Mesalina olivieri preys predominately upon ants, but also other small arthropods.

== Reproduction ==
Mesalina olivieri is oviparous. Clutch size is two to four eggs, and each sexually mature female lays at least two clutches per year.
