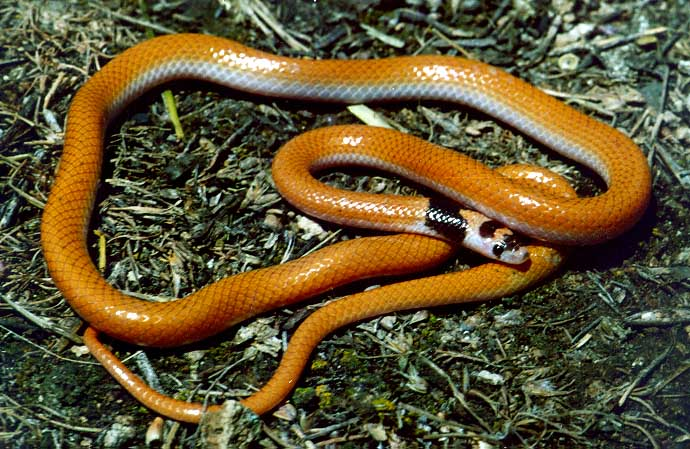
- Rhynchocalamus melanocephalus

Scientific classification
- Kingdom: Animalia
- Phylum: Chordata
- Class: Reptilia
- Order: Squamata
- Suborder: Serpentes
- Family: Colubridae
- Subfamily: Colubrinae
- Genus: Rhynchocalamus; Günther, 1864

= Rhynchocalamus =

Genus of snakes

Rhynchocalamus is a genus of snakes in the family Colubridae.

== Species ==
The following species are recognized as being valid.

- Rhynchocalamus arabicus Schmidt, 1933 - Aden kukri snake
- Rhynchocalamus dayanae Tamar, Šmíd, Göçmen, Meiri & Carranza, 2016 - Dayan’s kukri snake
- Rhynchocalamus hejazicus Licata, Pola, Šmíd, Ibrahim, Liz, Santos, Patkó, Abdulkareem, Gonçalves, AlShammari, Buasis, Egan, Ramalho, Smithson & Brito, 2024 - Hejaz black–collared snake
- Rhynchocalamus levitoni Torki, 2017
- Rhynchocalamus melanocephalus (Jan, 1862) - Palestine kukri snake
- Rhynchocalamus satunini (Nikolsky, 1899) - Palestine kukri snake

Nota bene: A binomial authority in parentheses indicates that the species was originally described in a genus other than Rynchocalamus.

In 2024, a species Rhynchocalamus hejazicus was discovered in the Hejaz region. An official placement is pending.

== Taxonomy ==
The species formerly known as Rhynchocalamus barani has been assigned to the monotypic genus Muhtarophis as Muhtarophis barani.
