= Red-spotted lizard =

Scientific classification
- Domain: Eukaryota
- Kingdom: Animalia
- Phylum: Chordata
- Class: Reptilia
- Order: Squamata
- Family: Lacertidae
- Genus: Mesalina
- Species: M. rubropunctata

Binomial name
- Mesalina rubropunctata (Lichtenstein, 1823)

Species of lizard

The red-spotted lizard (Mesalina rubropunctata) is a species of sand-dwelling lizard in the family Lacertidae. It occurs in Morocco, Western Sahara, Algeria, Libya, Egypt, Mauritania, Mali, Niger, and Sudan.
