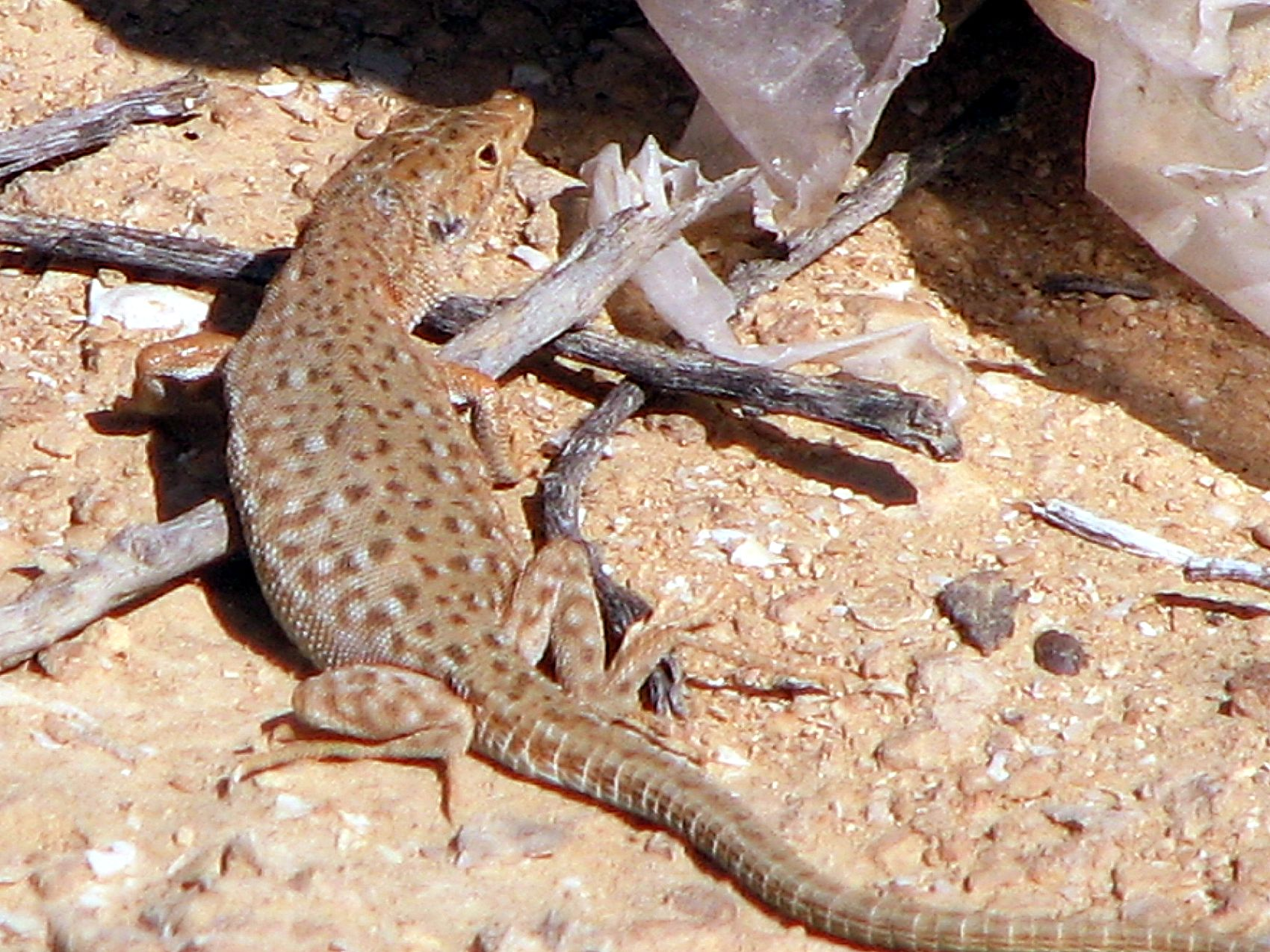
- Small-spotted lizard (Mesalina guttulata)

Scientific classification
- Kingdom: Animalia
- Phylum: Chordata
- Class: Reptilia
- Order: Squamata
- Family: Lacertidae
- Subfamily: Lacertinae
- Genus: Mesalina; Gray, 1838

Species
- 20 species, see text.

= Mesalina =

Genus of lizards

Mesalina is a genus of wall lizards of the family Lacertidae.

== Species ==
The following 20 described species are recognized as being valid.

- Mesalina adramitana (Boulenger, 1917) – Hadramaut sand lizard
- Mesalina adrarensis Pizzigalli, Crochet, Geniez, Martínez-Freiría, Velo-Antón & Brito, 2021
- Mesalina arnoldi Sindaco, Simó-Riudalbas, Sacchi & Carranza, 2018
- Mesalina austroarabica Sindaco, Simó-Riudalbas, Sacchi & Carranza, 2018
- Mesalina ayunensis Arnold, 1980 – Ayun sand lizard, Arnold's sand lizard
- Mesalina bahaeldini Segoli, Cohen & Y. Werner, 2002
- Mesalina balfouri (Blanford, 1881)
- Mesalina bernoullii (Schenkel, 1901) – Bernoulli's short-nosed desert lizard
- Mesalina brevirostris Blanford, 1874 – Blanford's short-nosed desert lizard
- Mesalina ercolinii (Lanza & Poggesi, 1975)
- Mesalina guttulata (Lichtenstein, 1823) – small-spotted lizard
- Mesalina kuri Joger & Mayer, 2002
- Mesalina martini (Boulenger, 1897) – Martin's desert racer
- Mesalina microlepis (Angel, 1936) – small-scaled desert lizard
- Mesalina olivieri (Audouin, 1829) – Olivier's sand lizard
- Mesalina pasteuri (Bons, 1960) – Pasteur's lizard
- Mesalina rubropunctata (Lichtenstein, 1823) – red-spotted lizard
- Mesalina saudiarabica Moravec, Šmíd, Schmitz, Shobrak & Wilms, 2017
- Mesalina simoni (Boettger, 1881) – Simon's desert racer
- Mesalina watsonana (Stoliczka, 1872) – Persian long-tailed desert lizard
- Mesalina bishnoi (D. Khandal & V. Sharma ,2026) — Kilda Lizard

Nota bene: A binomial authority in parentheses indicates that the species was originally described in a genus other than Mesalina.
