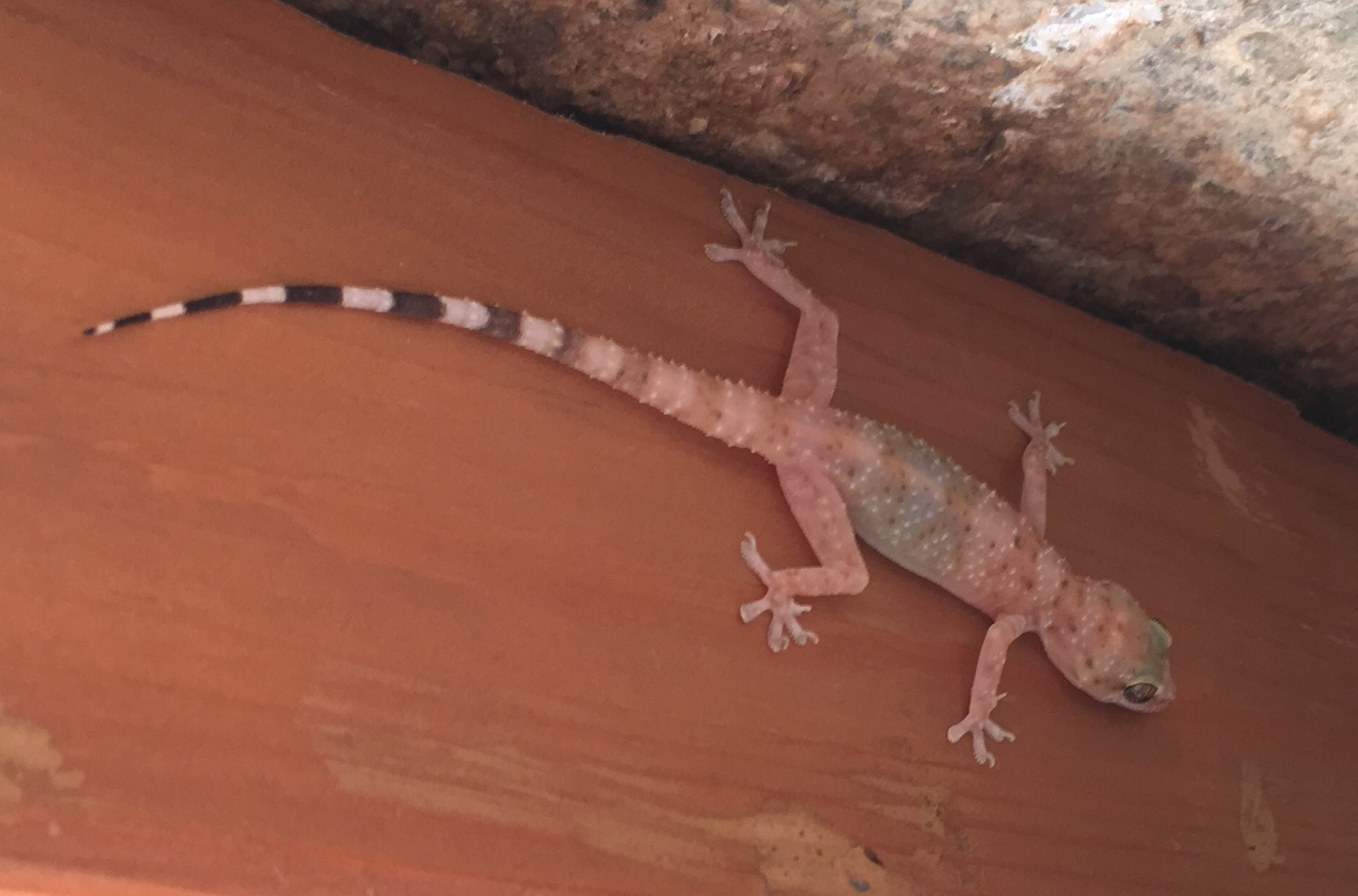

Conservation status
- Least Concern (IUCN 3.1)

Scientific classification
- Kingdom: Animalia
- Phylum: Chordata
- Class: Reptilia
- Order: Squamata
- Suborder: Gekkota
- Family: Gekkonidae
- Genus: Hemidactylus
- Species: H. mindiae

Binomial name
- Hemidactylus mindiae S. Baha El Din, 2005
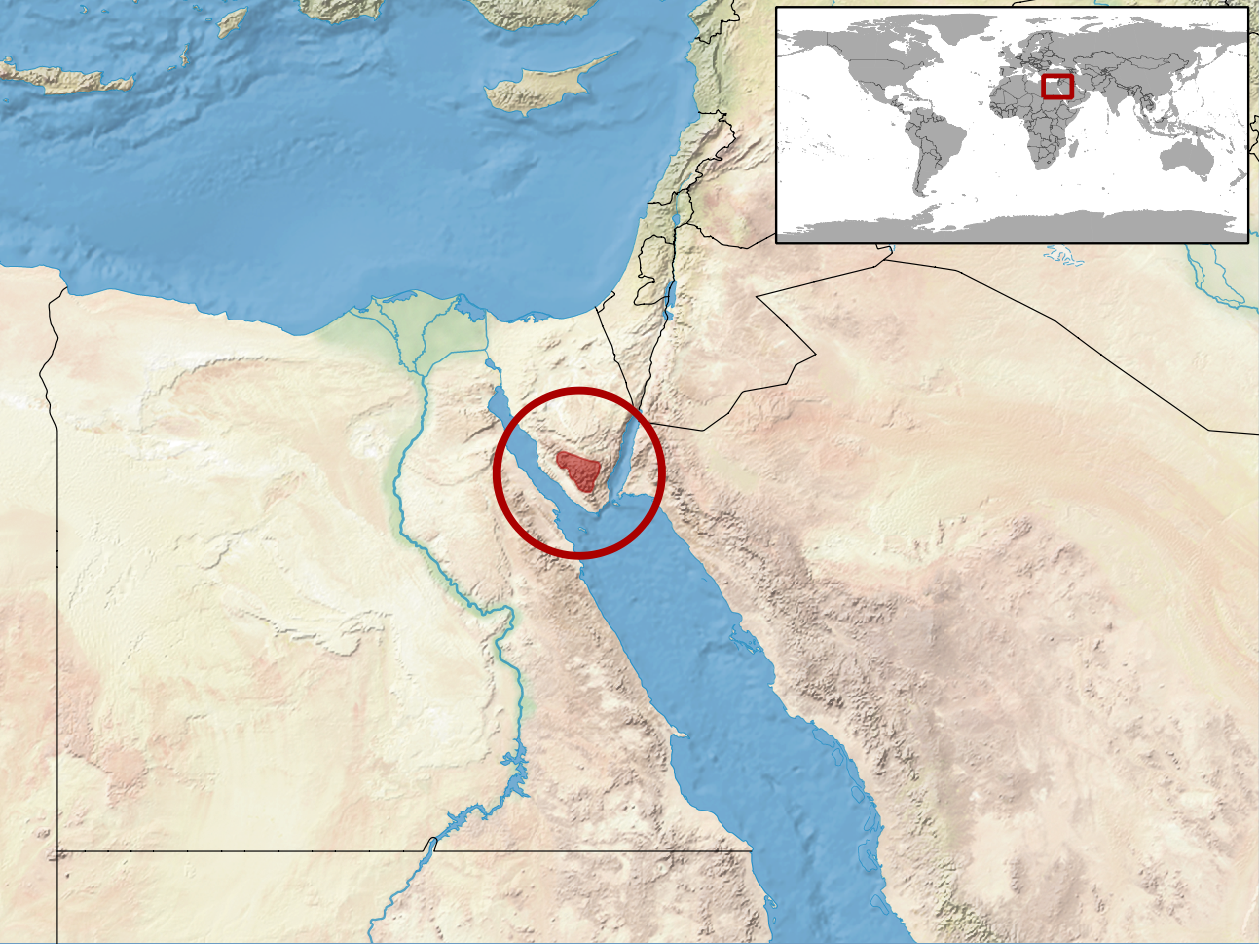

= Mount Sinai gecko =

Species of lizard

The Mount Sinai gecko (Hemidactylus mindiae) is a species of lizard in the family Gekkonidae. The species is endemic to Egypt.

== Habitat ==
The natural habitats of Hemidactylus mindiae are rocky areas and caves, at elevations of 600–2,000 m (2,000–6,600 ft), but it is also found in disturbed habitats such as rural gardens, and urban areas.

== Reproduction ==
Hemidactylus mindiae is oviparous.

== Conservation status ==
The Mount Sinai gecko is threatened by habitat loss due to quarrying and overgrazing of livestock.

== Etymology ==
The specific epithet, mindiae, commemorates the late Mindy Baha El Din, an environmentalist and herpetologist from Egypt. She was the wife of Sherif Baha El Din, also a herpetologist, who described this lizard as a new species.
