= Mindy Baha El Din =

American-Egyptian environmentalist

Mindy Baha El Din (1 November 1958 – 18 March 2013) was an American-born Egyptian environmentalist. Together with her husband, ornithologist and herpetologist Sherif Baha El Din she made contributions to the protection of migratory birds and their habitats, she also helped lay the foundations of the Nature Conservation Sector of the Egyptian Environmental Affairs Agency (EEAA) and in the establishment of Egypt's Protected Area network.

== Career ==
Mindy Baha El Din was born as Mindy Rosenzweig in Chicago, Illinois. After her graduation in 1982 with a degree in Arabic and economics at the Indiana University she took a course in field ornithology at the Cornell University and became a birdwatcher. As an employee of BirdLife International she went to Egypt in 1988 and established an environmental education center at the Giza Zoo in Giza. In the early 1990s she helped in establishing the Technical Office of the Environment of the EEAA, an environmental protection organization, which helped develop and finance its early development. In the late 1990s she and her husband, whom she married in 1989, worked as freelance ecologists and wildlife management consultants, organizing and guiding birding tours through Egypt, producing educational materials, launching campaigns promoting migratory bird conservation and studying migration. Mindy and Sherif Baha El Din were advisers of the Nature Conservation Sector within the EEAA. In 1994 they founded Tortoise Care Egypt, a group of international and local organizations and individuals, with the aim to build up a captive breeding project for the critically endangered Kleinmann's tortoise (Testudo kleinmanni ) which was extirpated in Egypt.

She suffered a stroke on 14 March 2013, of which she died on the 18 March in a hospital in Giza.

Sherif Baha El Din commemorated his wife with the scientific names of the Qattara gecko (Tarentola mindiae) in 1978, and the Mount Sinai gecko (Hemidactylus mindiae) in 2005.
