= Mesalina pasteuri =

Conservation status
- Least Concern (IUCN 3.1)

Scientific classification
- Kingdom: Animalia
- Phylum: Chordata
- Class: Reptilia
- Order: Squamata
- Family: Lacertidae
- Genus: Mesalina
- Species: M. pasteuri

Binomial name
- Mesalina pasteuri (Bons, 1960)

Synonyms
- Eremias pasteuri Bons, 1960; Mesalina pasteuri — Szczerbak, 1975

Species of lizard

Mesalina pasteuri, also known commonly as Pasteur's lizard, is a species of sand-dwelling lizard in the family Lacertidae. The species is endemic to North Africa.

== Etymology ==
The specific name, pasteuri, is in honor of French biologist Georges Pasteur.

== Geographic range ==
Mesalina pasteuri occurs in Algeria, Egypt, Mali, Mauritania, Morocco, Niger, and Western Sahara.

== Habitat ==
The preferred habitat of Mesalina pasteuri is desert.

== Description ==
Mesalina pasteuri may attain a snout-to-vent length (SVL) of 5 cm (2.0 in). The holotype, which measures 3.9 cm (1.5 in) SVL, has a tail 9.2 cm (3.6 in) long.

== Reproduction ==
Mesalina pasteuri is oviparous.
