= Mesalina martini =

Scientific classification
- Kingdom: Animalia
- Phylum: Chordata
- Class: Reptilia
- Order: Squamata
- Family: Lacertidae
- Genus: Mesalina
- Species: M. martini

Binomial name
- Mesalina martini (Boulenger, 1897)

Species of lizard

Mesalina martini, also known commonly as Martin's desert racer and the Red Sea lizard, is a species of sand-dwelling lizard in the family Lacertidae. The species is native to the shores of the Red Sea.

== Geographic distribution ==
Mesalina martini occurs in Egypt, Eritrea, Ethiopia, Somalia, Sudan, and Yemen
