= Hemidactylus sinaitus =

Scientific classification
- Domain: Eukaryota
- Kingdom: Animalia
- Phylum: Chordata
- Class: Reptilia
- Order: Squamata
- Infraorder: Gekkota
- Family: Gekkonidae
- Genus: Hemidactylus
- Species: H. sinaitus

Binomial name
- Hemidactylus sinaitus Boulenger, 1885

Synonyms
- Hemidactylus shugraensis

Species of lizard

Hemidactylus sinaitus, also known as the Red Sea gecko or Sinai leaf-toed gecko, is a species of gecko. It is found in Yemen and northeastern Africa between Egypt and Somalia.
