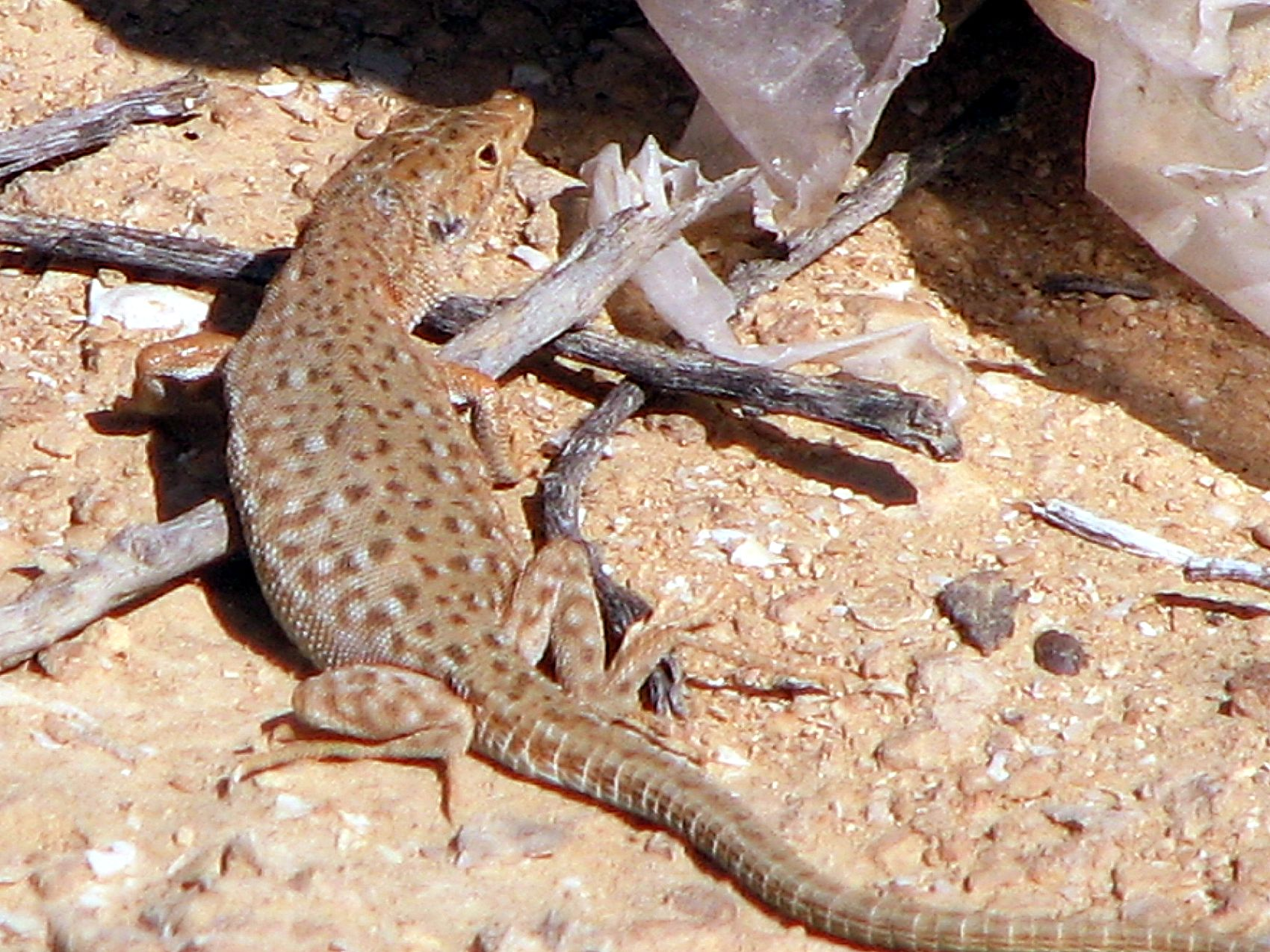

Conservation status
- Least Concern (IUCN 3.1)

Scientific classification
- Kingdom: Animalia
- Phylum: Chordata
- Class: Reptilia
- Order: Squamata
- Suborder: Lacertoidea
- Family: Lacertidae
- Genus: Mesalina
- Species: M. guttulata

Binomial name
- Mesalina guttulata (Lichtenstein, 1823)

= Small-spotted lizard =

Species of lizard

The small-spotted lizard (Mesalina guttulata) is a species of lizard. It is found in the following countries: Morocco, Algeria, Tunisia, Libya, Egypt, Sinai, Israel, Saudi Arabia, Iran (Kavir desert), India, S. Turkmenistan, N. Africa, Afghanistan, Pakistan, Senegal, Niger, Sudan, Syria. Type locality: Egypt.

== Description ==
Adult lizards reach the maximum length of 55 mm, including tail.
