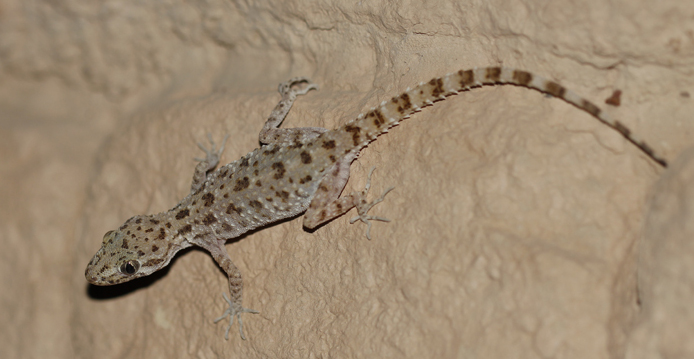

Conservation status
- Least Concern (IUCN 3.1)

Scientific classification
- Kingdom: Animalia
- Phylum: Chordata
- Class: Reptilia
- Order: Squamata
- Suborder: Gekkota
- Family: Gekkonidae
- Genus: Cyrtopodion
- Species: C. scabrum

Binomial name
- Cyrtopodion scabrum (Heyden, 1827)
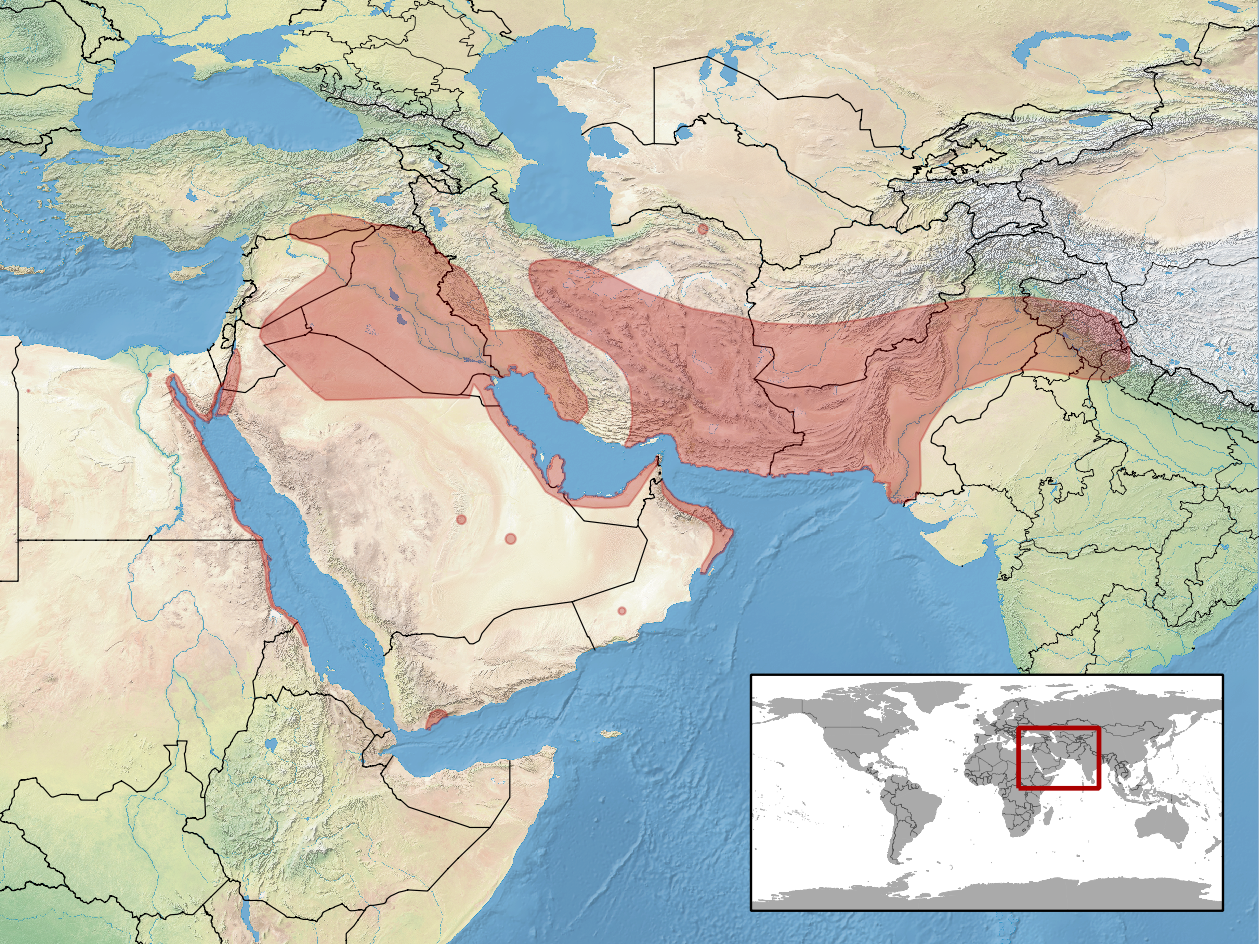

Synonyms
- Stenodactylus scaber Heyden, 1827; Gymnodactylus scaber — A.M.C. Duméril & Bibron, 1836; Cyrtodactylus scaber — Underwood, 1954; Cyrtodactylus basoglui Baran & Gruber, 1982; Cyrtopodion scaber — Kluge, 1985; Tenuidactylus scaber — Szczerbak & Golubev, 1986; Cyrtopodion scabrum — Crother, 2000

= Cyrtopodion scabrum =

Species of lizard

Cyrtopodion scabrum, also known as the rough-tailed gecko, rough bent-toed gecko, rough-tailed bowfoot gecko, common tuberculate ground gecko, or keeled gecko, is a species of gecko, a lizard in the family Gekkonidae. The species is endemic to West Asia, South Asia and parts of North Africa.

== Taxonomy ==
Cyrtopodion basoglui is considered conspecific with Cyrtopodion scabrum. Because Cyrtopodion scabrum was originally described in 1827 and Cyrtodactylus basoglui was described in 1982, Cyrtodactylus basoglui is a junior synonym of Cyrtopodion scabrum.

== Geographic range ==
C. scabrum is found in West Asia (Iraq, Israel, Jordan, Kuwait, Oman, Qatar, Saudi Arabia, Syria, Turkey, United Arab Emirates and Yemen), South Asia (Afghanistan, India and Pakistan) and parts of North Africa (Egypt and Sudan, though the latter's origin is uncertain). It is possibly extinct in Eritrea, though its origin is uncertain in this region, and an introduced population is present in Iran and the United States (Texas).

== As an introduced species ==
In the United States, C. scabrum has been introduced in Nevada, Arizona and Texas. A breeding population has been established in Galveston, Texas, in the area of the commercial shipping docks.
