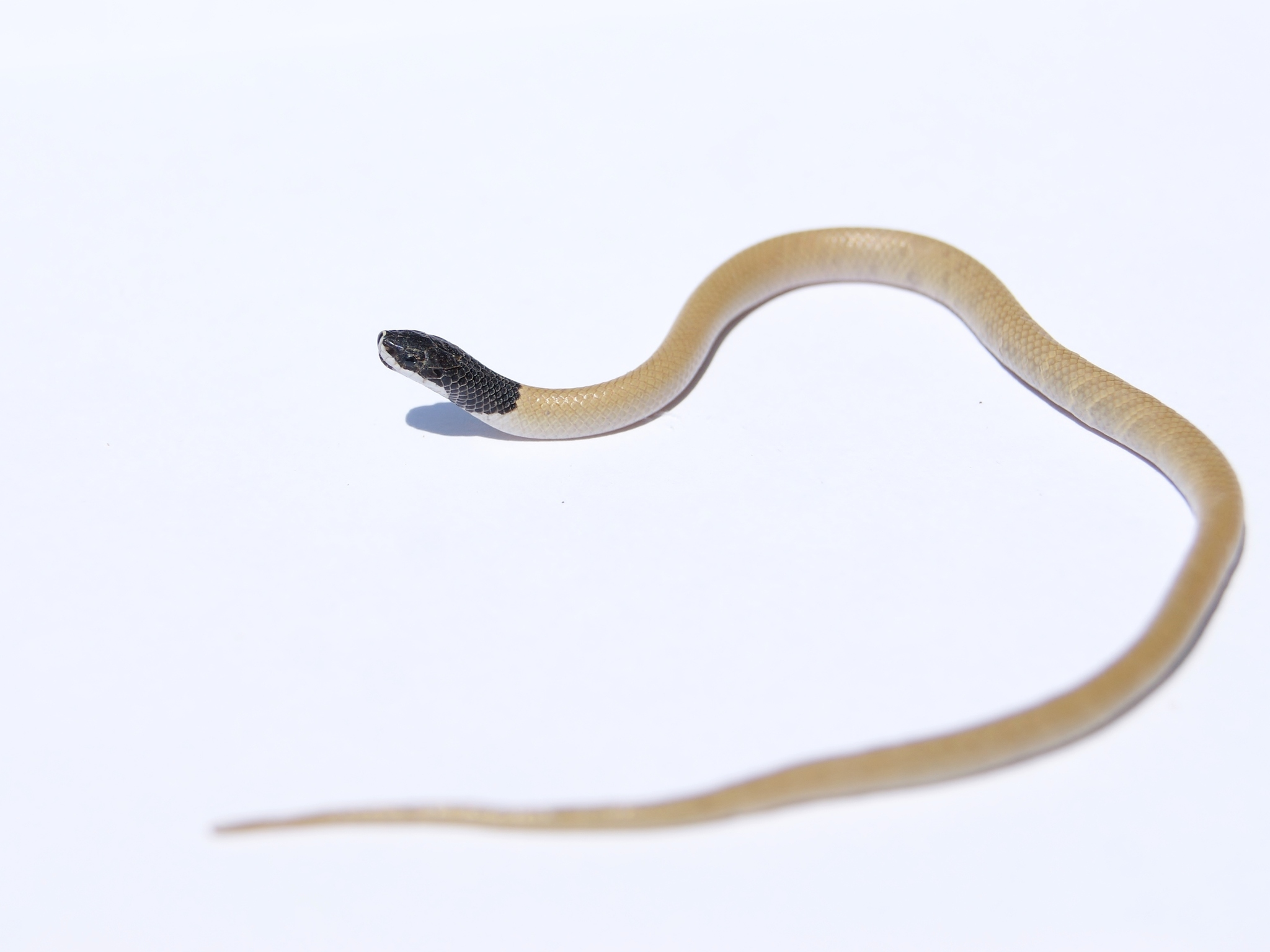
- Adult male R. m. melanocephalus from Israel

Conservation status
- Least Concern (IUCN 3.1)

Scientific classification
- Kingdom: Animalia
- Phylum: Chordata
- Class: Reptilia
- Order: Squamata
- Suborder: Serpentes
- Family: Colubridae
- Genus: Rhynchocalamus
- Species: R. melanocephalus

Binomial name
- Rhynchocalamus melanocephalus Jan, 1862

Synonyms
- Homalosoma melanocephalum Jan, 1862; Oligodon melanocephalus — Günther, 1865; Contia satunini Nikolsky, 1899; Oligodon melanocephalus septentrionalis F. Werner, 1905

= Rhynchocalamus melanocephalus =

Species of snake

The black-headed ground snake (Rhynchocalamus melanocephalus), also known as the Palestine kukri snake, is a species of small and elegant harmless snake, which is endemic to the Eastern Mediterranean and the Near East. It belongs to the Colubridae family. Two subspecies, Rhynchocalamus melanocephalus melanocephalus and Rhynchocalamus melanocephalus satunini, are currently recognized.

== Description ==
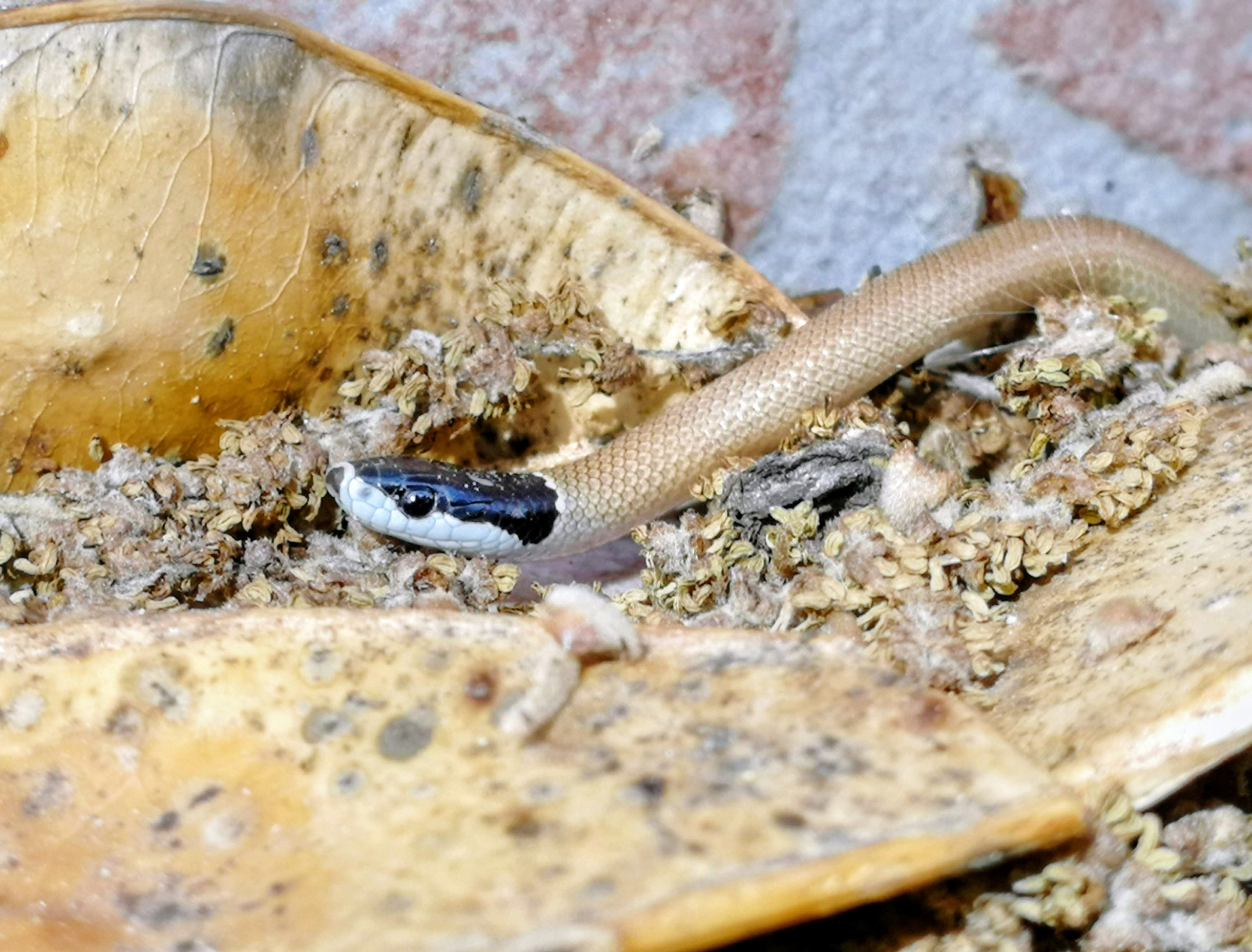
Close up

The black-headed ground snake is a small, burrowing snake with a slender body reaching just 36–40 cm (14–16 in) in total length (body + tail). Its smooth and shiny dorsal scales and almost transparent covering make many of its internal organs quite visible, when observed against a light source. The eyes are small, with black irises. The head is covered with symmetrical large shields. The rostral shield is somewhat enlarged and specialized for digging through soil. The dorsal coloration may vary from tan to orange, with no obvious pattern except on the neck and head. The belly is clear white.

The pattern on the neck and head is different in the two subspecies. In the nominate subspecies, Rhynchocalamus melanocephalus melanocephalus, there is no separation between the neck pattern and the head pattern. The upper surface of the head and neck is ash-black. Only the labials, the nasals, and the rostal are white. In R. melanocephalus satunini the neck carries a black semi-collar, and the head pattern consists of three transverse black saddles. The first one is on the rostral. The second spreads over the postnasal, supraorbital, and frontal, and partially over the prefrontal shields from eye to eye. The third saddle covers the parietal shields and some of the surrounding scales. The spaces between the black saddles are white, which makes Rhynchocalamus visually identifiable from similar looking species of the genera Eirenis and Pseudocyclophis, which often occupy the same habitat.

== Natural history ==
Very little is known about the natural history of the black-headed ground snake. This burrowing species spends most of its life underground, and depends heavily on the soil humidity. It can be found only rarely, mainly under rocks, or extremely rarely on the surface after heavy rains in late spring and early summer.

== Diet ==
This little predator forages on larvae and eggs of ants, and possibly other invertebrates.

== Geographic range ==
This snake is known from dry shrublands of the Eastern Mediterranean and Near Eastern countries. There are records from Armenia, Azerbaijan, Israel, Iran, Iraq, Jordan, Lebanon, Saudi Arabia, Syria, Turkey and in 2013 was formally noted in Cyprus. The southern part of its range is occupied by the nominotypical subspecies, Rhynchocalamus melanocephalus melanocephalus Jan, 1862. Populations from Armenia, Azerbaijan, northeastern Turkey, and northwestern Iran form the subspecies, Rhynchocalamus melanocephalus satunini Nikolsky, 1899.

== Habitats and ecology ==
This snake is known from rocky, clayey semideserts. It spends most of its time underground, and rarely may be found under rocks after heavy rains in spring and early summer.

== Land use and protection ==
Habitats of the black-headed ground snake have been largely irrigated or transformed into urban areas. Also, in many places, semidesert is being used as pasture for domestic goats, sheep, and cattle.

== Conservation status ==
This species is classified as Least Concern (LC) according to the IUCN Red List of Threatened Species, but was included in the Red Lists of Armenia, Azerbaijan, and the former USSR as an extremely rare species.
