= Mesalina brevirostris =

Conservation status
- Least Concern (IUCN 3.1)

Scientific classification
- Domain: Eukaryota
- Kingdom: Animalia
- Phylum: Chordata
- Class: Reptilia
- Order: Squamata
- Family: Lacertidae
- Genus: Mesalina
- Species: M. brevirostris

Binomial name
- Mesalina brevirostris (Blanford, 1874)

Species of lizard

Mesalina brevirostris, also known as Blanford's short-nosed desert lizard, is a species of sand-dwelling lizard in the family Lacertidae. It occurs in Saudi Arabia, Qatar, Iran, and United Arab Emirates.
