= Qattara gecko =

Conservation status
- Near Threatened (IUCN 3.1)

Scientific classification
- Kingdom: Animalia
- Phylum: Chordata
- Class: Reptilia
- Order: Squamata
- Suborder: Gekkota
- Family: Phyllodactylidae
- Genus: Tarentola
- Species: T. mindiae

Binomial name
- Tarentola mindiae S. Baha El Din, 1997

Species of lizard

The Qattara gecko (Tarentola mindiae) is a species of lizard in the family Phyllodactylidae.

== Description ==
Tarentola mindiae is a relatively large and robust gecko, with a maximum snout-to-vent length (SVL) of 81 mm (3.2 in). The back is covered in bands of warty tubercules. It is light brown on the upperside, with 5-6 dark bands across the back, a dark streak running from the nose through the eye, and irregular streaks and marbling on the head and limbs. The underside is pale greyish-white with small dark spots. The iris is ochre.

== Etymology ==
The specific name, mindiae, commemorates Mindy Baha El Din, an environmentalist and herpetologist from Egypt. She was the wife of Sherif Baha El Din, also a herpetologist, who described this lizard as a new species.

== Geographic range ==
Tarentola mindiae is found in Egypt and Libya. The areas it has been confirmed to occur in are the Qattara Depression and the Siwa Oasis in Egypt and Jialo Oasis in eastern Libya.

== Habitat ==
The natural habitats of Tarentola miniae are dry savanna, subtropical or tropical dry shrubland, and freshwater springs.

== Behaviour ==
Tarentola mindiae is arboreal and territorial, it occurs in small, isolated clusters of vegetation where it can be found at quite high densities. It is nocturnal and has been observed walking slowly across on the sand between vegetation at night, and tracks show that it may move quite far between trees and bushes. During the day it hides under the bark of dead acacias or among the roots of tamarisks.

== Reproduction ==
Tarentola mindiae is oviparous. The females bury their eggs in the soil, and they lay 4 clutches of 2 eggs each in a season. The young are mature within a year.

== Longevity ==
In captivity, Tarentola mindiae can live for quite a long time (at least seven years).

== Conservation status ==
Tarentola mindiae is threatened by habitat loss. In Egypt, it is expected to lose much of its currently suitable distribution in the future due to anthropogenic climate change.
