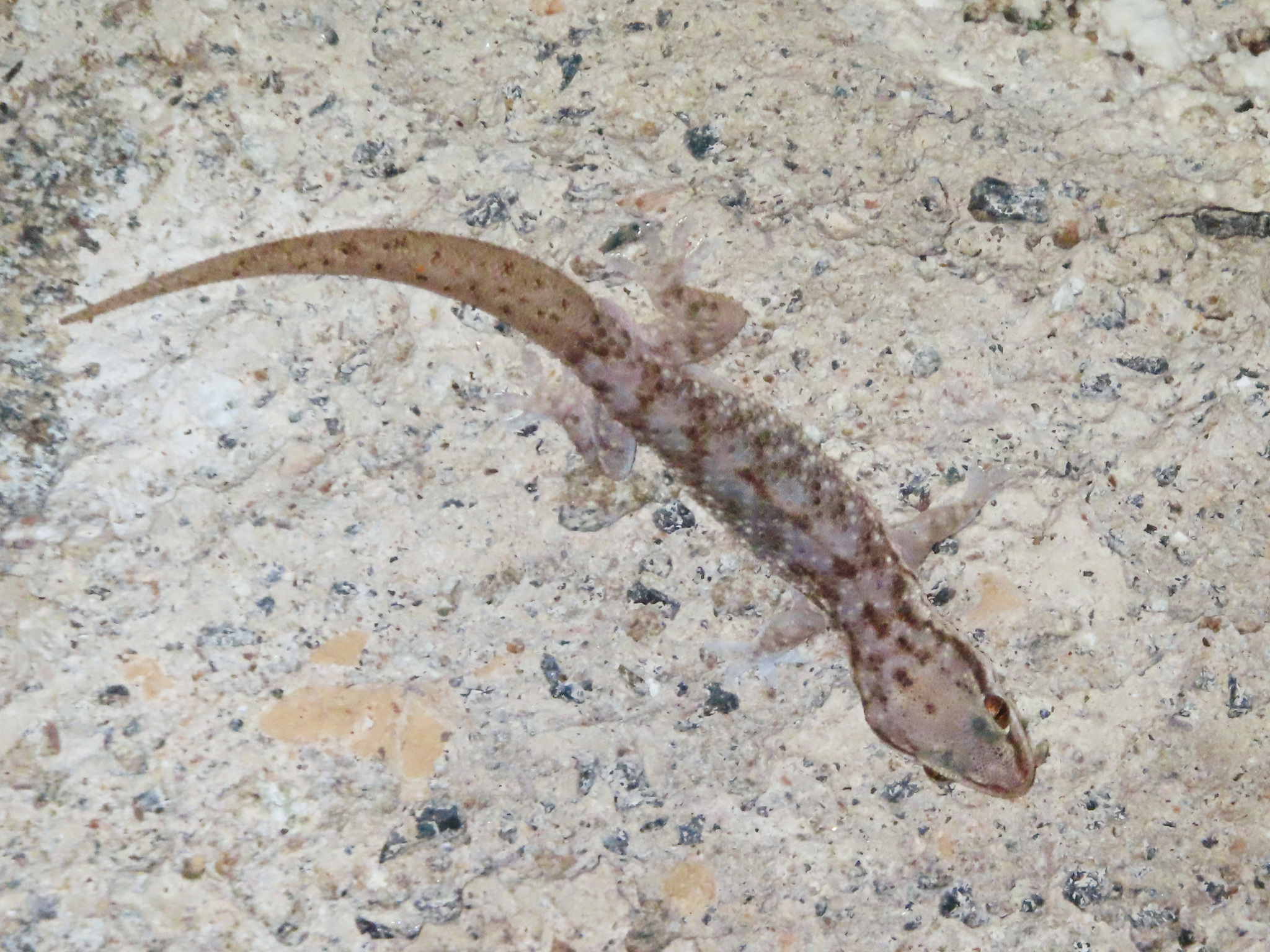

Conservation status
- Least Concern (IUCN 3.1)

Scientific classification
- Kingdom: Animalia
- Phylum: Chordata
- Class: Reptilia
- Order: Squamata
- Suborder: Gekkota
- Family: Gekkonidae
- Genus: Hemidactylus
- Species: H. robustus

Binomial name
- Hemidactylus robustus Heyden, 1827

= Heyden's gecko =

Species of lizard

Heyden's gecko (Hemidactylus robustus) is a species of geckos, family Gekkonidae, found in northeastern Africa and in the Middle East.

== Distribution ==
It may be found in Egypt, Sudan, Eritrea, Ethiopia, Somalia, Kenya, Yemen, Oman, Qatar, Iraq, Iran, Saudi Arabia, the United Arab Emirates and Pakistan. qatar

== Conservation status ==
In Egypt, it is expected to lose much of its currently suitable distribution in the future due to anthropogenic climate change.

== Original publication ==
- Heyden, 1827 : Atlas zu der Reise im nördlichen Afrika. I. Zoologie. Reptilien. H. L. Brönner, p. 1-24 (integrated text).
