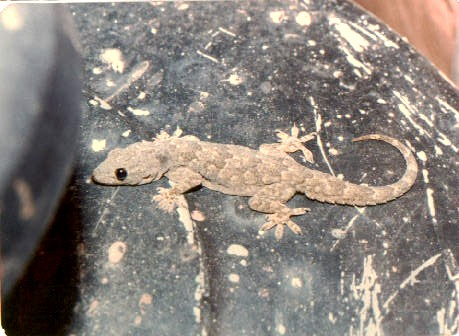

Conservation status
- Least Concern (IUCN 3.1)

Scientific classification
- Kingdom: Animalia
- Phylum: Chordata
- Class: Reptilia
- Order: Squamata
- Suborder: Gekkota
- Family: Gekkonidae
- Genus: Hemidactylus
- Species: H. flaviviridis

Binomial name
- Hemidactylus flaviviridis Rüppell, 1835

Synonyms
- Hemidactylus flaviridis; Hemidactylus flavoviridis; Hemidactylus sericeus; Hemidactylus coctaei; Boltalia sublevis; Boltalia sublaevis; Hoplopodion cocteaui; Hoplopodion rüppellii; Hemidactylus bengaliensis; Hemidactylus bengalensis; Hemidactylus zolii

= Hemidactylus flaviviridis =

Species of lizard

Hemidactylus flaviviridis is a species of gecko. It is known as the yellow-belly gecko or northern house gecko.

== Distribution ==
Its range includes Egypt (Ismailia, Sinai), Saudi Arabia, the United Arab Emirates, Qatar, Oman, Iraq, Iran, Afghanistan, Bangladesh, Nepal, Pakistan, India, Argentina, Socotra Island (Yemen), northern Somalia, Sudan, Ethiopia, and Eritrea. The type locality is Massawa Island, Abyssinia.

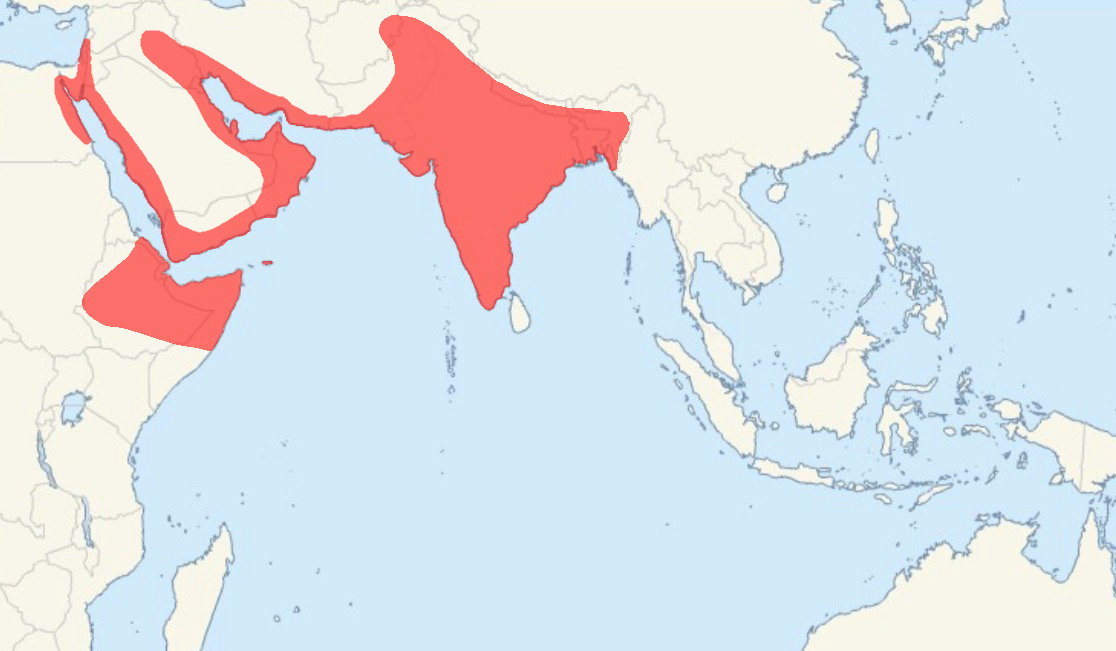
Northern House Gecko Habitat Map
