= Ehrenfried Schenkel-Haas =

Ehrenfried Schenkel
- Born: May 10, 1869; Basel, Switzerland
- Died: 1953 (aged 83–84)
- Known for: Studies on arachnids; contributions to herpetology
- Scientific career
- Fields: Zoology, Arachnology, Herpetology
- Institutions: University of Basel, Natural History Museum of Basel

Ehrenfried Schenkel, also known as Ehrenfried Schenkel-Haas (10 May 1869 – 1953), was a Swiss zoologist specializing in arachnology. He also made important contributions to herpetology.

== Career ==
Born in Basel on 10 May 1869, Schenkel obtained a chair in Natural History at the University of Basel in 1892.

Between 1890 and 1902, he was curator at the Natural History Museum of Basel. There he came into contact with the herpetologist Fritz Müller and had the opportunity to study reptiles, as well as fish and crustaceans, but he mainly focused on arachnids, to which he later devoted all his free time.

In 1902, he left his position as curator to study Chemistry, but dissatisfied with that path, he dedicated himself to teaching in a Basel secondary school from 1909 to 1935.

His studies focused on the arachnid fauna of Switzerland, Ticino, Germany, the Arctic (Faroe Islands, Lapland, Scandinavia), China, the Iberian Peninsula, and the islands of Canaries, Madeira, and the Azores. ehren Schenkel described, among others, the species: Gallotia stehlini, a lizard endemic to Gran Canaria and the Mesalina bernoullii, a lizard endemic to the Middle East.

== Selected publications ==
- "Schwedisch-chinesische wissenschaftliche Expedition nach den nordwestlichen Provinzen Chinas, unter Leitung von Dr Sven Hedin und Prof. Sü Ping-chang. Araneae gesammelt vom schwedischen Artz der Exped". Arkiv för Zoologi. 29 (A1): 1–314, 1936.
- "Beitrag zur Spinnenkunde". Revue Suisse de Zoologie 46 (3): 95–114. (Full text in PDF), 1953.
- "Bericht über einige Spinnentiere aus Venezuela". Verhandlungen der Naturforschenden Gesellschaft in Basel 64: 1–57, 1953.
- "Chinesische Arachnoidea aus dem Museum Hoangho-Peiho in Tientsin". Boletim do Museu Nacional do Rio de Janeiro (N. S., Zool.) 119: 1–108, 1953.
- "Ostasiatische Spinnen aus dem Muséum d‘Histoire naturelle de Paris". Mémoires du Muséum National d’Histoire Naturelle de Paris (Série A – Zoologie) 25 (2): 1–481, 1963.

== Abbreviation ==
The abbreviation Schenkel is used to indicate this author as the authority in the description and taxonomy of zoological species.
