= List of reptiles of Jordan =

Jordan has about 115 species of reptiles, most of them are snakes and lizards, but there are some turtles. There are no crocodiles are found in the country.

== Statistics ==
- Snakes: 45 species
- Lizards: 63 species
- Turtles: 7 species

== Snakes ==
Atractaspis
Atractaspis engaddensis
Cerastes
Cerastes cerastes
Cerastes gasperettii
Daboia
Daboia palaestinae
Dolichophis
Dolichophis caspius
Dolichophis jugularis
Dolichophis schmidti
Echis
Echis coloratus
Eirenis
Eirenis coronella
Eirenis coronelloides
Eirenis decemlineatus
Eirenis lineomaculatus
Eirenis rothii
Eryx
Eryx jaculus
Hemorrhois
Hemorrhois nummifer
Hemorrhois ravergieri
Letheobia
Letheobia simonii
Lytorhynchus
Lytorhynchus diadema
Lytorhynchus kennedyi
Macrovipera
Macrovipera lebetinus
Malpolon
Malpolon insignitus
Malpolon moilensis
Malpolon monspessulanus
Micrelaps
Micrelaps muelleri
Micrelaps tchernovi
Myriopholis
Myriopholis macrorhyncha
Natrix
Natrix tessellata
Platyceps
Platyceps collaris
Platyceps elegantissimus
Platyceps rhodorachis
Platyceps rogersi
Platyceps saharicus
Platyceps sinai
Platyceps ventromaculatus
Psammophis
Psammophis schokari
Pseudocerastes
Pseudocerastes fieldi
Pseudocerastes persicus
Rhynchocalamus
Rhynchocalamus melanocephalus
Spalerosophis
Spalerosophis diadema
Telescopus
Telescopus dhara
Telescopus fallax
Telescopus hoogstraali
Telescopus nigriceps
Walterinnesia
Walterinnesia aegyptia
Xerotyphlops
Xerotyphlops vermicularis

== Lizards ==
Ablepharus
Ablepharus kitaibelii
Ablepharus pannonicus
Ablepharus rueppellii
Acanthodactylus
Acanthodactylus ahmaddisii
Acanthodactylus boskianus
Acanthodactylus cantoris
Acanthodactylus grandis
Acanthodactylus hardyi
Acanthodactylus opheodurus
Acanthodactylus pardalis
Acanthodactylus robustus
Acanthodactylus schmidti
Acanthodactylus scutellatus
Acanthodactylus tilburyi
Acanthodactylus tristrami
Bunopus
Bunopus blanfordii
Bunopus tuberculatus
Chalcides
Chalcides guentheri
Chalcides ocellatus
Chalcides sepsoides
Chamaeleo
Chamaeleo chamaeleon
Cyrtopodion
Cyrtopodion scabrum
Eumeces
Eumeces schneiderii
Eurylepis
Eurylepis taeniolata
Hemidactylus
Hemidactylus dawudazraqi
Hemidactylus mindiae
Hemidactylus turcicus
Heremites
Heremites vittatus
Lacerta
Lacerta media
Laudakia
Laudakia stellio
Mediodactylus
Mediodactylus kotschyi
Mediodactylus orientalis
Mesalina
Mesalina bernoullii
Mesalina guttulata
Mesalina microlepis
Mesalina olivieri
Ophiomorus
Ophiomorus latastii
Ophisops
Ophisops elegans
Phoenicolacerta
Phoenicolacerta kulzeri
Phoenicolacerta laevis
Phrynocephalus
Phrynocephalus arabicus
Phrynocephalus maculatus
Pristurus
Pristurus flavipunctatus
Pristurus rupestris
Pseudopus
Pseudopus apodus
Pseudotrapelus
Pseudotrapelus aqabensis
Pseudotrapelus sinaitus
Ptyodactylus
Ptyodactylus ananjevae
Ptyodactylus guttatus
Ptyodactylus hasselquistii
Ptyodactylus puiseuxi
Scincus
Scincus scincus
Stenodactylus
Stenodactylus doriae
Stenodactylus grandiceps
Stenodactylus slevini
Stenodactylus sthenodactylus
Trapelus
Trapelus agnetae
Trapelus mutabilis
Trapelus ruderatus
Tropiocolotes
Tropiocolotes nattereri
Tropiocolotes steudneri
Uromastyx
Uromastyx aegyptia
Varanus
Varanus griseus

== Turtles ==
Caretta
Caretta caretta
Chelonia
Chelonia mydas
Dermochelys
Dermochelys coriacea
Eretmochelys
Eretmochelys imbricata
Mauremys
Mauremys caspica
Mauremys rivulata
Testudo
Testudo graeca
