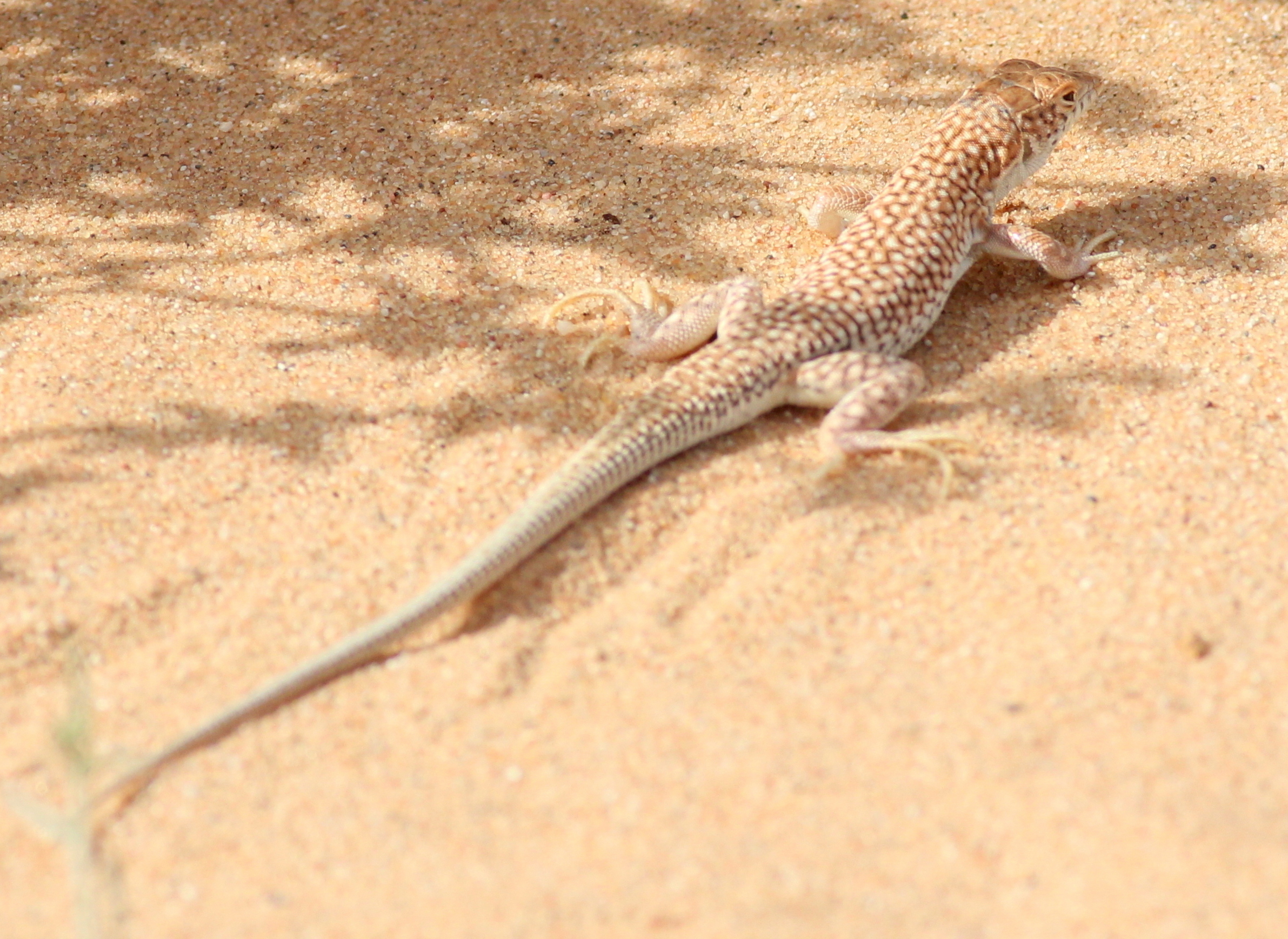

Conservation status
- Least Concern (IUCN 3.1)

Scientific classification
- Kingdom: Animalia
- Phylum: Chordata
- Class: Reptilia
- Order: Squamata
- Family: Lacertidae
- Genus: Acanthodactylus
- Species: A. dumerilii

Binomial name
- Acanthodactylus dumerilii (Milne-Edwards, 1829)

Synonyms
- Lacerta dumerilii Milne-Edwards, 1829; Scapteira inornata Gray, 1838; Acanthodactylus scutellatus var. exiguus Lataste, 1885; Acanthodactylus dumerili — Bons & Girot, 1964; Acanthodactylus dumerilii — Crochet, Geniez & Ineich, 2003

= Duméril's fringe-fingered lizard =

Duméril’s fringe-fingered lizard

Species of lizard

Duméril's fringe-fingered lizard (Acanthodactylus dumerilii) is a species of lizard in the family Lacertidae. A. dumerilii is in the A. scutellatus species group. A. dumerilii is native to the western and central Sahara.

== Etymology ==
The specific name, dumerilii, is in honor of French herpetologist André Marie Constant Duméril.

== Description ==
Duméril's fringe-fingered lizard is overall yellowish brown, as are many fringed fingered lizards. Its body is gracile and elongated. It has long fingers with fringe-like scales, which gave the genus its common name. It can be distinguished from A. longipes by the presence of contrasting dark brown or black spots across the dorsal surface.

== Habitat and geographic range ==
The typical habitat of Duméril's fringe-fingered lizard is mainly found in the deserts of Algeria, Libya, Morocco, Mauritania, Senegal, Tunisia and the Western Sahara. In the areas of Erg Chebbi and M’hamid of Southern Morocco it is found together with Acanthodactylus longipes. However, these closely related species prefer different habitats. Duméril's fringe-fingered lizard avoids deserts free of vegetation and is mainly found at the edges of dunes overgrown by some bushes and halfa grass (Stipa tenacissima), or lives in soil covered with sparse vegetation, where it constructs its burrows.

== Diet and ecology ==
=== Silver ants ===
Duméril's fringe-fingered lizard eats insects, mainly Saharan silver ants. These ants have large soldiers with saber-like mandibles for defending against the lizard. If the lizard cannot dig up the underground colony, it places its burrow near the colony to exploit over a longer time. The silver ants in turn have special scouts who watch the burrow of the fringed lizard and alert the workers as soon as the lizard enters the burrow to protect itself from the heat of the sun, upon which the ants swarm out to gather food.

=== Locusts ===
Occasional locust swarms also supply Duméril's fringed lizard with food. However, some locust species such as the desert locust consume toxic plants like the Egyptian henbane, accumulating noxious substances. The locusts develop a warning coloration at higher population density, which is noticeably intensified to indicate their potential toxicity. Duméril's fringe-fingered lizard avoids desert locusts with such coloration.

== Reproduction ==
A. dumerilii is oviparous.
