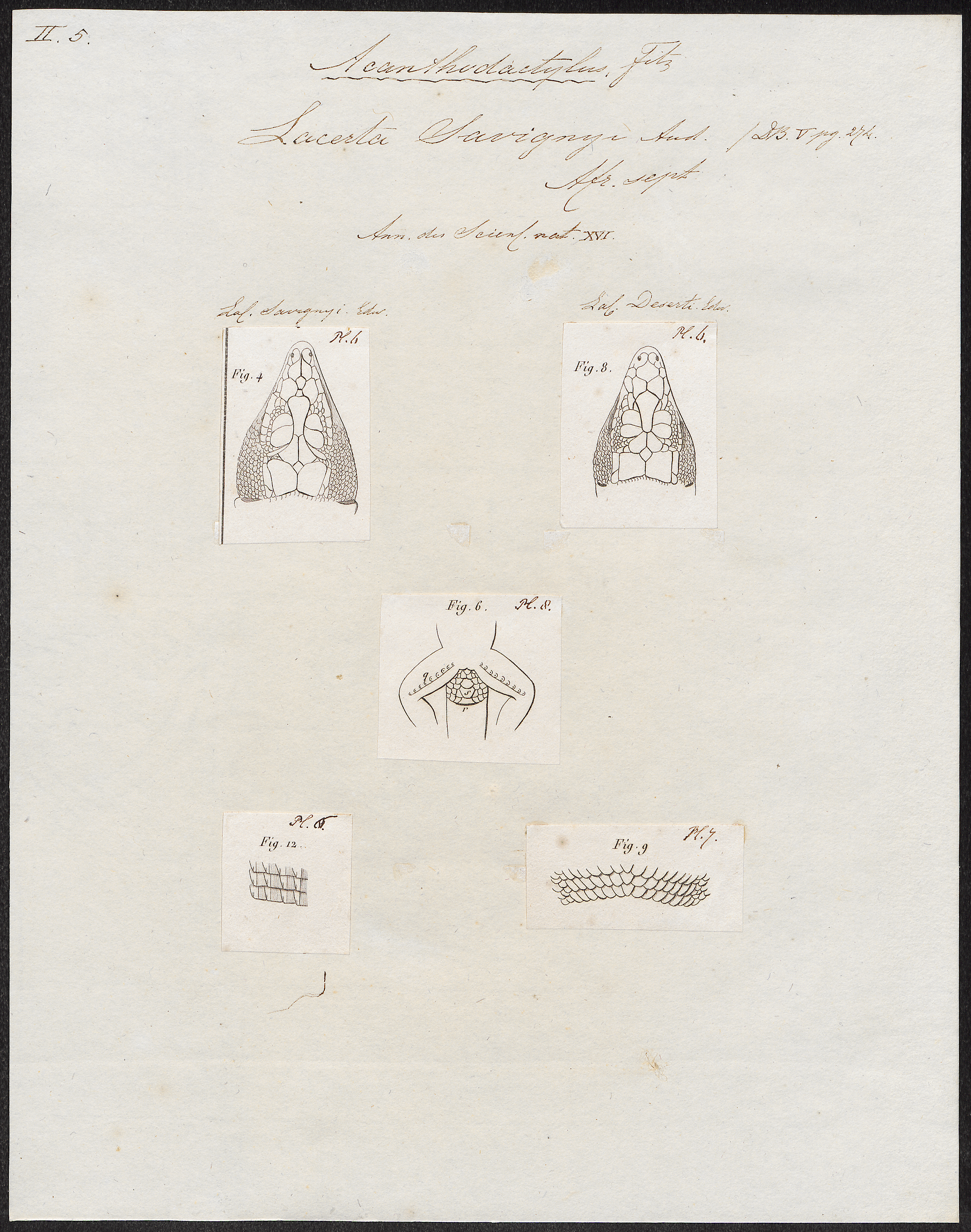

Conservation status
- Endangered (IUCN 3.1)

Scientific classification
- Kingdom: Animalia
- Phylum: Chordata
- Class: Reptilia
- Order: Squamata
- Family: Lacertidae
- Genus: Acanthodactylus
- Species: A. savignyi

Binomial name
- Acanthodactylus savignyi (Audouin, 1809)

Synonyms
- Lacerta savignyi Audouin, 1809; Acanthodactylus savignyi — A.M.C. Duméril & Bibron, 1839; Acanthodactylus vaillanti Lataste, 1885; Acanthodactylus savignyi — Boulenger, 1887; Acanthodactylus savignyi var. oranensis Doumergue, 1901; Acanthodactylus savignyi — Boulenger, 1918; Acanthodactylus savignyi — Salvador, 1982

= Savigny's fringe-fingered lizard =

Species of lizard

Savigny's fringe-fingered lizard (Acanthodactylus savignyi) is a species of lizard in the family Lacertidae. The species is endemic to western North Africa.

== Etymology ==
Both the specific name, savignyi, and the common name, Savignyi's fringe-fingered lizard, are in honor of French zoologist Marie Jules César Savigny.

== Geographic range ==
A. savignyi is found in Algeria and possibly Morocco.

== Habitat ==
The natural habitats of Savignyi's fringe-fingered lizard are temperate shrubland, Mediterranean-type shrubby vegetation, and sandy shores.

== Reproduction ==
A. savignyi is oviparous.

== Conservation status ==
A. savignyi is threatened by habitat loss.
