= Acanthodactylus aegyptius =

Conservation status
- Least Concern (IUCN 3.1)

Scientific classification
- Kingdom: Animalia
- Phylum: Chordata
- Class: Reptilia
- Order: Squamata
- Family: Lacertidae
- Genus: Acanthodactylus
- Species: A. aegyptius

Binomial name
- Acanthodactylus aegyptius Baha El Din, 2007

Species of lizard

Acanthodactylus aegyptius, commonly called the egyptian fringe-fingered lizard, is a species of lizard in the family Lacertidae. The species is endemic to the Middle East.

== Taxonomy ==
The taxonomy of Acanthodactylus aegyptius was refined by Baha El Din in 2007 through a detailed re-examination of Egyptian fringe-toed lizard populations originally classified as Acanthodactylus longipes. His analysis revealed that populations located east of 28º E possessed distinct characteristics worthy of species-level recognition, leading to the formal description of A. aegyptius. While geographically separated in some regions, the two species maintain a sympatric relationship in specific areas of the Egyptian Western Desert and the Qattara Depression, where their ranges overlap.

== Etymology ==
The specific name, aegyptius, refers to Egypt, where the holotype was collected.

== Geographic range ==
A. aegyptius is found in eastern Egypt, Israel, and northern Sinai.

== Reproduction ==
A. aegyptius is oviparous.
