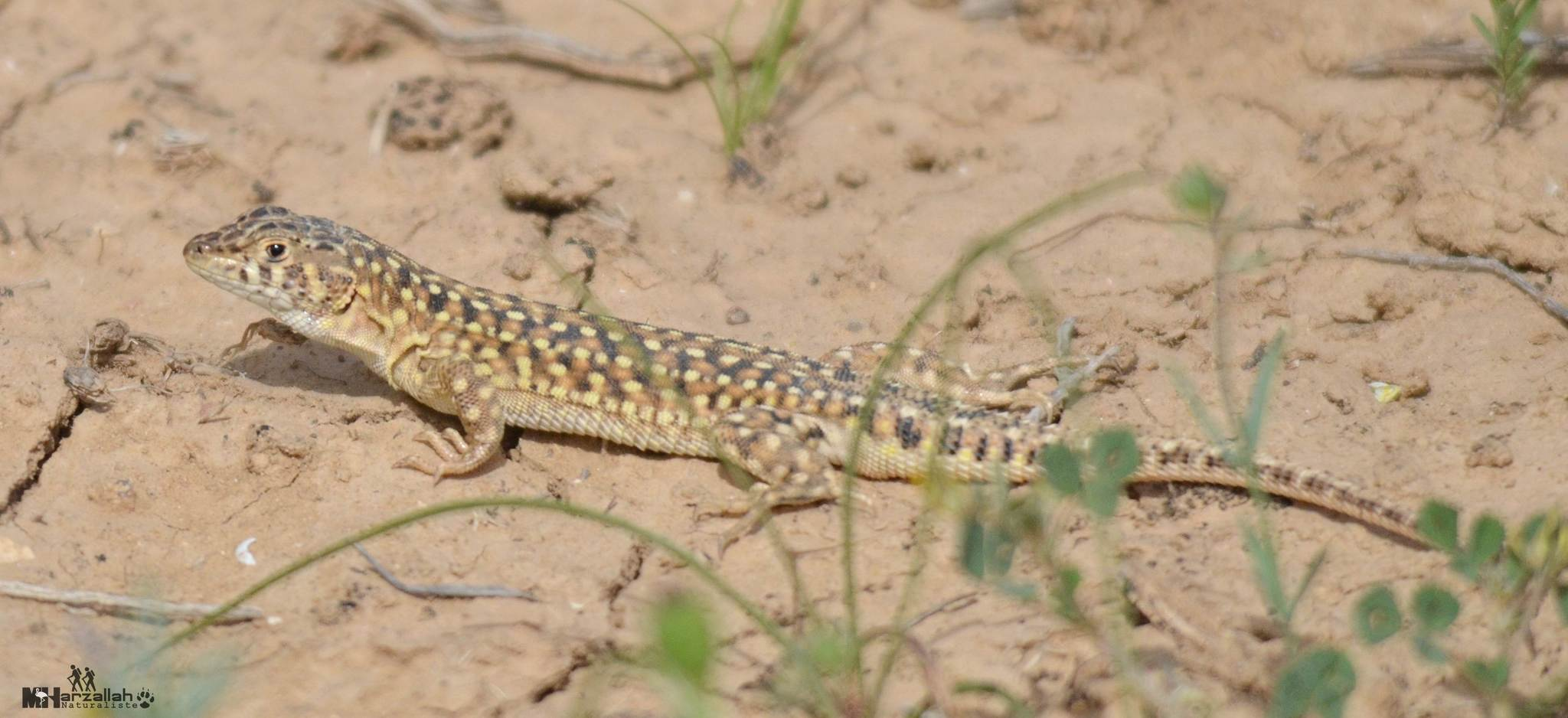

Conservation status
- Least Concern (IUCN 3.1)

Scientific classification
- Kingdom: Animalia
- Phylum: Chordata
- Class: Reptilia
- Order: Squamata
- Family: Lacertidae
- Genus: Acanthodactylus
- Species: A. maculatus

Binomial name
- Acanthodactylus maculatus (Gray, 1838)

Synonyms
- Scapteira maculata Gray, 1838; Zootoca deserti Günther, 1859; Acanthodactylus pardalis var. intermedius Doumergue, 1901; Acanthodactylus pardalis latastei Boulenger, 1918

= Acanthodactylus maculatus =

Species of lizard

Acanthodactylus maculatus, known commonly as the spotted fringe-fingered lizard and the spotted fringe-toed lizard, is a species of lizard in the family Lacertidae. The species is endemic to north-western Africa.

== Geographic range ==
A. maculatus is found in Algeria, Libya, Morocco, and Tunisia.

== Habitat ==
The natural habitats of A. maculatus are subtropical or tropical dry shrubland, hot deserts, and sandy shores.

== Reproduction ==
A. maculatus is oviparous.

== Conservation status ==
The species A. maculatus is threatened by habitat loss.
