= Acanthodactylus blanci =

Conservation status
- Near Threatened (IUCN 3.1)

Scientific classification
- Kingdom: Animalia
- Phylum: Chordata
- Class: Reptilia
- Order: Squamata
- Family: Lacertidae
- Genus: Acanthodactylus
- Species: A. blanci

Binomial name
- Acanthodactylus blanci Doumergue, 1901

Species of lizard

Acanthodactylus blanci, commonly known as the white fringe-fingered lizard or Blanc's fringe-toed lizard, is a species of lizard in the family Lacertidae. The species is endemic to North Africa.

== Etymology ==
The specific name, blanci, is in honor of a "M[onsieur] Blanc " of Tunis who collected the holotype specimen.

== Geographic range ==
Acanthodactylus blanci is found in Algeria and Tunisia.

== Description ==
Adults of A. blanci are 6 to 9 inches (15 to 23 cm) in total length (including tail).

== Reproduction ==
A. blanci is oviparous.

== Habitat ==
The natural habitats of A. blanci are temperate forests, Mediterranean-type shrubby vegetation, sandy shores, and plantations.

== Conservation status ==
A. blanci is threatened by habitat loss.
