= Acanthodactylus micropholis =

Scientific classification
- Kingdom: Animalia
- Phylum: Chordata
- Class: Reptilia
- Order: Squamata
- Family: Lacertidae
- Genus: Acanthodactylus
- Species: A. micropholis

Binomial name
- Acanthodactylus micropholis Blanford, 1874

Species of lizard

Acanthodactylus micropholis, known commonly as the Persian fringe-toed lizard and the yellowtail fringe-fingered lizard, is a species of lizard in the family Lacertidae. The species is endemic to Asia.

== Geographic range ==
A. micropholis is found in Afghanistan, Iran, and Pakistan.

== Reproduction ==
A. micropholis is oviparous.
