= Acanthodactylus taghitensis =

Conservation status
- Least Concern (IUCN 3.1)

Scientific classification
- Kingdom: Animalia
- Phylum: Chordata
- Class: Reptilia
- Order: Squamata
- Family: Lacertidae
- Genus: Acanthodactylus
- Species: A. taghitensis

Binomial name
- Acanthodactylus taghitensis Geniez & Foucart, 1995

Species of lizard

Acanthodactylus taghitensis is a species of lizard in the family Lacertidae. The species is endemic to northwestern Africa.

== Geographic range ==
A. taghitensis is found in Algeria, Mauritania, and Western Sahara.

== Habitat ==
The preferred habitats of A. taghitensis are shrubland and desert.

== Reproduction ==
A. taghitensis is oviparous.
