= Acanthodactylus busacki =

Busack's fringe-fingered lizard

Conservation status
- Least Concern (IUCN 3.1)

Scientific classification
- Kingdom: Animalia
- Phylum: Chordata
- Class: Reptilia
- Order: Squamata
- Family: Lacertidae
- Genus: Acanthodactylus
- Species: A. busacki

Binomial name
- Acanthodactylus busacki Salvador, 1982

Species of lizard

Acanthodactylus busacki, called commonly Busack's fringe-fingered lizard, is a species of lizard in the family Lacertidae. The species is endemic to northwestern Africa.

== Etymology ==
The specific name, busacki, is in honor of American herpetologist Stephen D. Busack (born 1944).

== Geographic range ==
A. busacki is found in Morocco and Western Sahara.

== Habitat ==
The preferred natural habitats of A. busacki are desert and shrubland, at altitudes from sea level to 580 m (1,900 ft).

== Description ==
A. busacki may attain a maximum snout-to-vent length (SVL) of 7.3 cm (2.9 in). Adult males are reddish on the posterior throat, neck, anterior body and belly, and forelimbs.

== Reproduction ==
A. busacki is oviparous.
