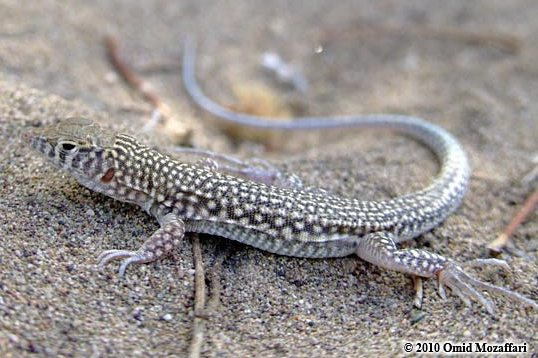

Conservation status
- Least Concern (IUCN 3.1)

Scientific classification
- Kingdom: Animalia
- Phylum: Chordata
- Class: Reptilia
- Order: Squamata
- Family: Lacertidae
- Genus: Acanthodactylus
- Species: A. blanfordii

Binomial name
- Acanthodactylus blanfordii Boulenger, 1918

Synonyms
- Acanthodactylus cantoris var. blanfordii Boulenger, 1918; Acanthodactylus blanfordi [sic] — Salvador, 1982; Acanthodactylus blanfordii — Das, 1996

= Acanthodactylus blanfordii =

Blanford's fringe-fingered lizard

Species of lizard

Acanthodactylus blanfordii, commonly called Blanford's fringe-fingered lizard, is a species of lizard in the family Lacertidae. The species is endemic to the Middle East and India. Recent genetic studies have reclassified Acanthodactylus blanfordii into a newly recognized blanfordii group within the Eastern clade of Acanthodactylus. This group is genetically distinct from the cantoris group, where A. blanfordii was previously placed based solely on morphological characteristics.

== Geographic range ==
Acanthodactylus blanfordii is found in SE Iran, S Afghanistan, SW Pakistan, N Oman (Muscat region), and India.

The type locality is "Perse et Béloutchistan ".

== Etymology ==
Both the specific name, blanfordii, and the common name, Blanford's fringe-fingered lizard, are in honor of English naturalist William Thomas Blanford (1832–1905), member of the Geological Survey of India.

== Reproduction ==
A. blanfordii is oviparous.
