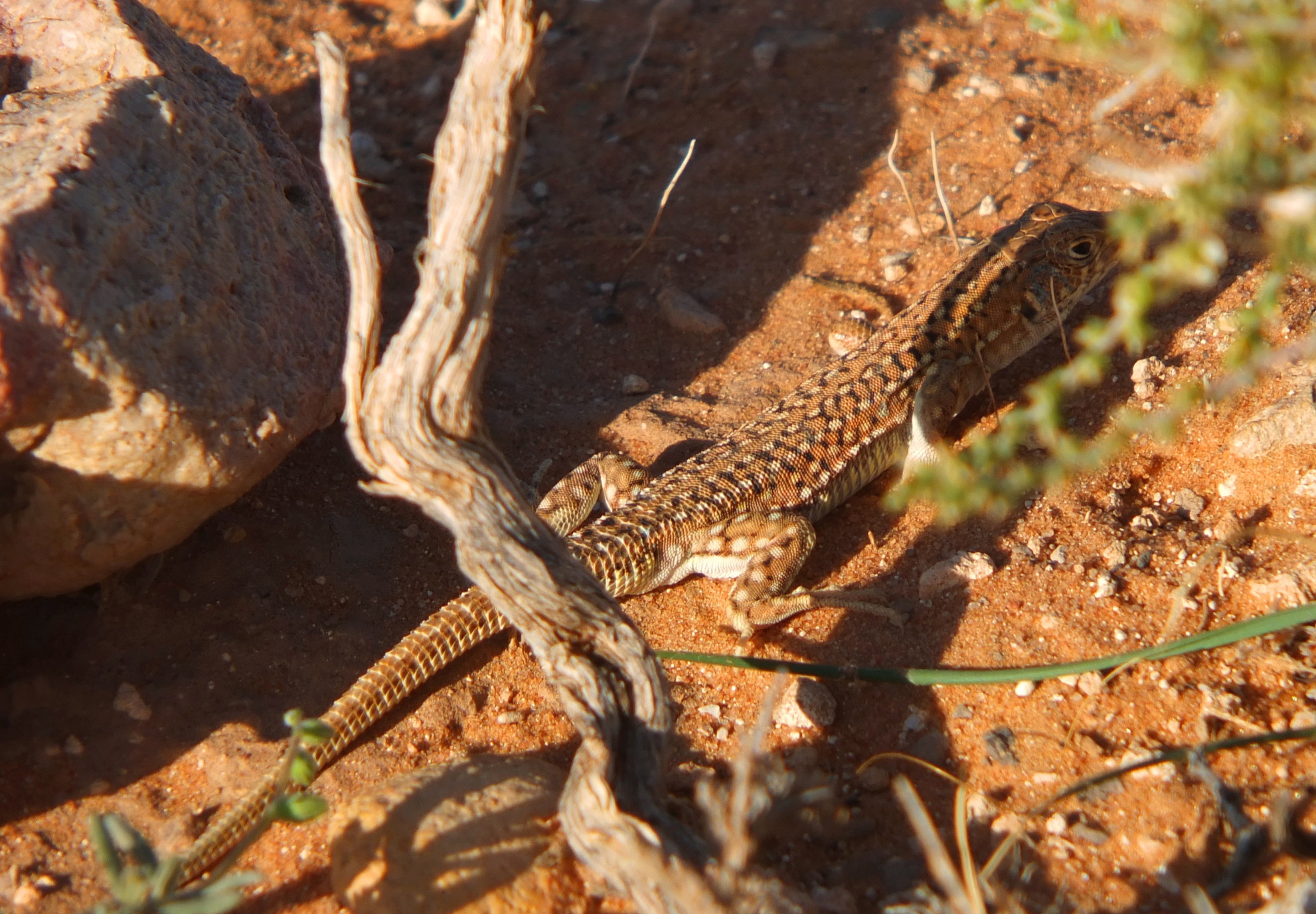

Conservation status
- Near Threatened (IUCN 3.1)

Scientific classification
- Kingdom: Animalia
- Phylum: Chordata
- Class: Reptilia
- Order: Squamata
- Family: Lacertidae
- Genus: Acanthodactylus
- Species: A. bedriagai

Binomial name
- Acanthodactylus bedriagai Lataste, 1881

= Bedriaga's fringe-fingered lizard =

Species of lizard

Bedriaga's fringe-fingered lizard (Acanthodactylus bedriagai) is a species of lizard in the family Lacertidae. The species is endemic to Algeria.

== Etymology ==
Both the specific name, bedriagai, and the common name are in honor of Russian herpetologist Jacques von Bedriaga.

== Geographic range ==
A. bedriagai is native to northern Algeria, where it is found on the Hauts Plateaux and in the Aureus-Kabili Mountains.

== Habitat ==
The natural habitat of A. bedriagai is subtropical or tropical dry shrubland, at altitudes up to 1,000 m (3,300 ft).

== Reproduction ==
Acanthodactylus bedriagai is oviparous.
