= Acanthodactylus boueti =

Conservation status
- Data Deficient (IUCN 3.1)

Scientific classification
- Kingdom: Animalia
- Phylum: Chordata
- Class: Reptilia
- Order: Squamata
- Family: Lacertidae
- Genus: Acanthodactylus
- Species: A. boueti

Binomial name
- Acanthodactylus boueti Chabanaud, 1917

Species of lizard

Acanthodactylus boueti, also known commonly as Chabanaud's fringe-fingered lizard, is a species of lizard in the family Lacertidae. The species is native to West Africa.

== Etymology ==
The specific name, boueti, is in honor of French physician and ornithologist Georges Bouet (1869–1957), who worked in French West Africa in 1906–1930.

== Geographic range ==
A. boueti is found in Benin, Ghana, Nigeria, and Togo.

== Habitat ==
The preferred natural habitat of A. boueti is savanna, at altitudes from sea level to 500 m (1,600 ft).

== Reproduction ==
A. boueti is oviparous.
