= Acanthodactylus yemenicus =

Conservation status
- Least Concern (IUCN 3.1)

Scientific classification
- Kingdom: Animalia
- Phylum: Chordata
- Class: Reptilia
- Order: Squamata
- Family: Lacertidae
- Genus: Acanthodactylus
- Species: A. yemenicus

Binomial name
- Acanthodactylus yemenicus Salvador, 1982

Species of lizard

Acanthodactylus yemenicus, known commonly as the Yemen fringe-fingered lizard, the Yemen fringe-toed lizard, or the Yemen spiny-toed lizard, is a species of lizard in the family Lacertidae. The species is endemic to Yemen.

== Habitat ==
The preferred habitats of A. yemenicus are desert and rocky areas such as cliffs and mountain peaks.

== Reproduction ==
A. yemenicus is oviparous.
