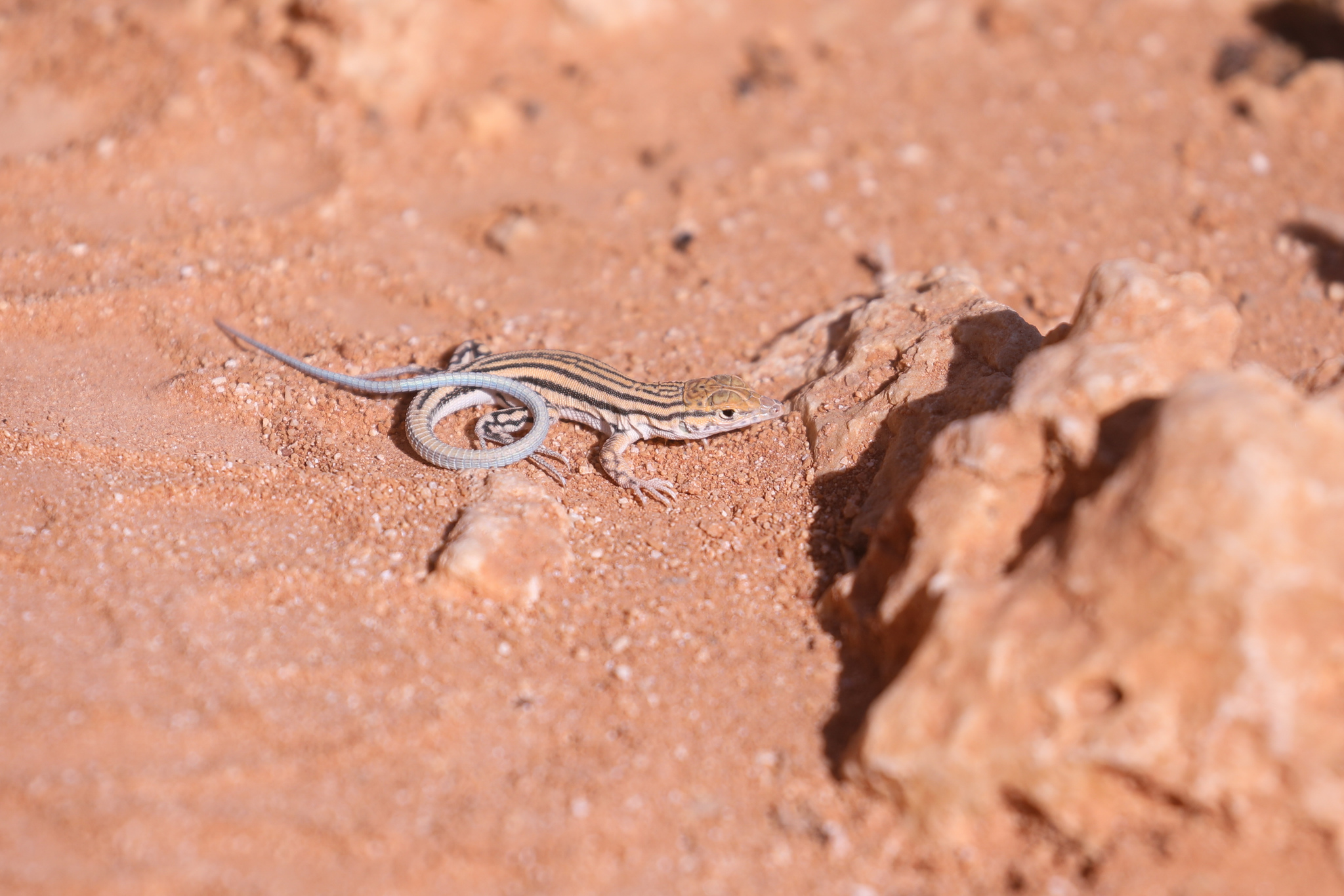

Conservation status
- Data Deficient (IUCN 3.1)

Scientific classification
- Kingdom: Animalia
- Phylum: Chordata
- Class: Reptilia
- Order: Squamata
- Family: Lacertidae
- Genus: Acanthodactylus
- Species: A. masirae

Binomial name
- Acanthodactylus masirae Arnold, 1980

= Acanthodactylus masirae =

Species of lizard

Acanthodactylus masirae, also commonly called the Masira fringe-fingered lizard or the Masira fringe-toed lizard, is a species of lizard in the family Lacertidae. The species is endemic to Oman.

== Etymology ==
The specific name, masirae, refers to the type locality, Masirah Island.

== Geographic range ==
In Oman, A. masirae is found on Masirah Island and in Dhofar Governorate.

== Reproduction ==
A. masirae is oviparous.
