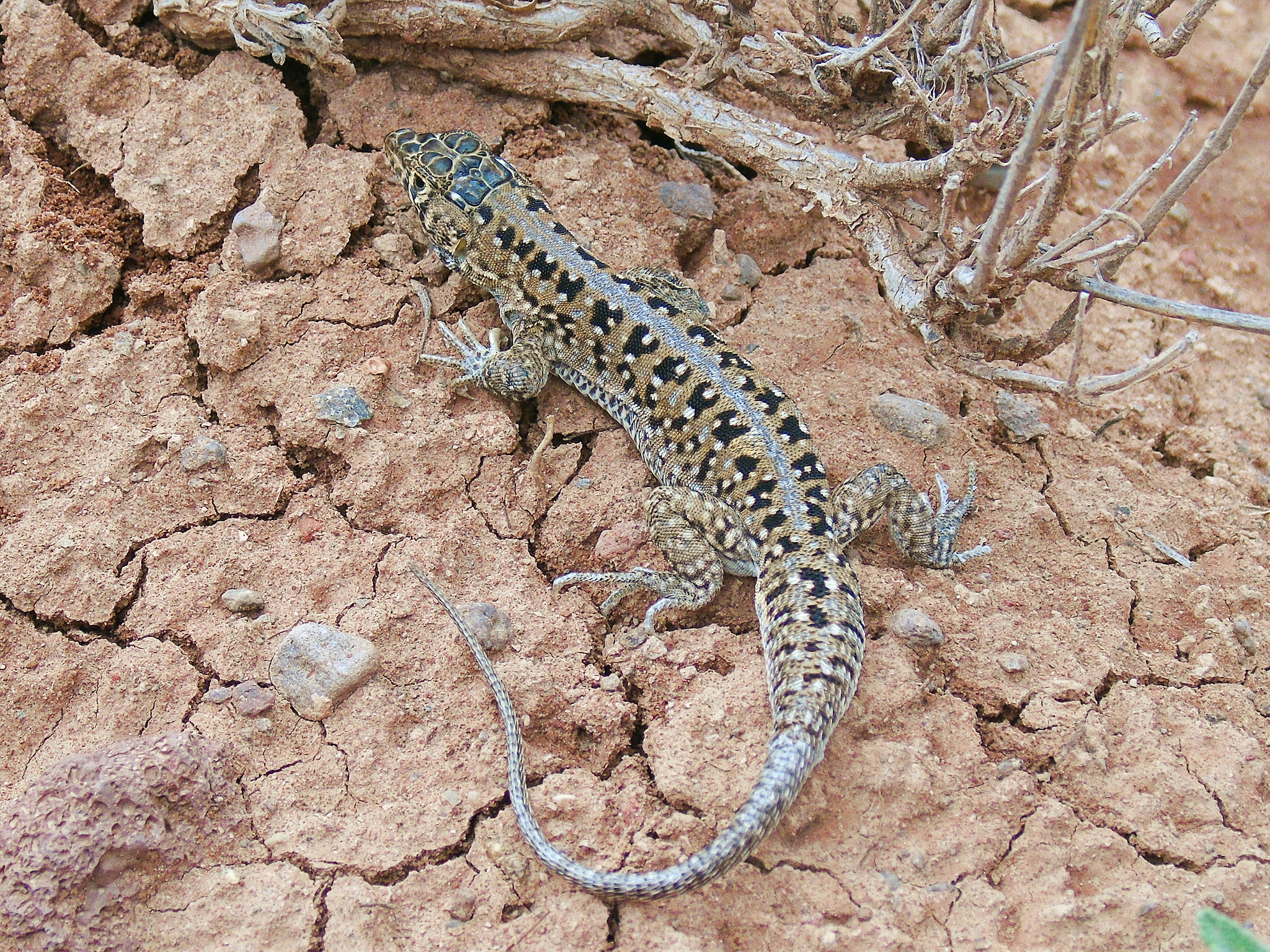

Scientific classification
- Kingdom: Animalia
- Phylum: Chordata
- Class: Reptilia
- Order: Squamata
- Family: Lacertidae
- Genus: Acanthodactylus
- Species: A. ilgazi

Binomial name
- Acanthodactylus ilgazi Kurnaz & Şahin, 2021

= Acanthodactylus ilgazi =

Species of lizard

Acanthodactylus ilgazi is a species of lizard in the family Lacertidae. The species is endemic to Turkey.
