= Acanthodactylus margaritae =

Conservation status
- Near Threatened (IUCN 3.1)

Scientific classification
- Kingdom: Animalia
- Phylum: Chordata
- Class: Reptilia
- Order: Squamata
- Family: Lacertidae
- Genus: Acanthodactylus
- Species: A. margaritae

Binomial name
- Acanthodactylus margaritae Tamar, Geniez, Brito & Crochet, 2017

Species of lizard

Acanthodactylus margaritae is a species of lizard in the family Lacertidae. The species is endemic to Morocco.

== Etymology ==
The specific name, margaritae, is in honor of Greek herpetologist Margarita Metallinou, who died while doing field work in Africa in 2015.

== Geographic range ==
A. margaritae is found in southern Morocco.

== Habitat ==
A. margaritae inhabits a variety of desert and semidesert habitats, including stony plains, stable sands, fixed dunes, hard clay with sparse low vegetation, and open argan tree forest.

== Description ==
The maximum recorded snout-to-vent length (SVL) for A. margaritae is 7.1 cm (2.8 in).

== Reproduction ==
A. margaritae is oviparous.
