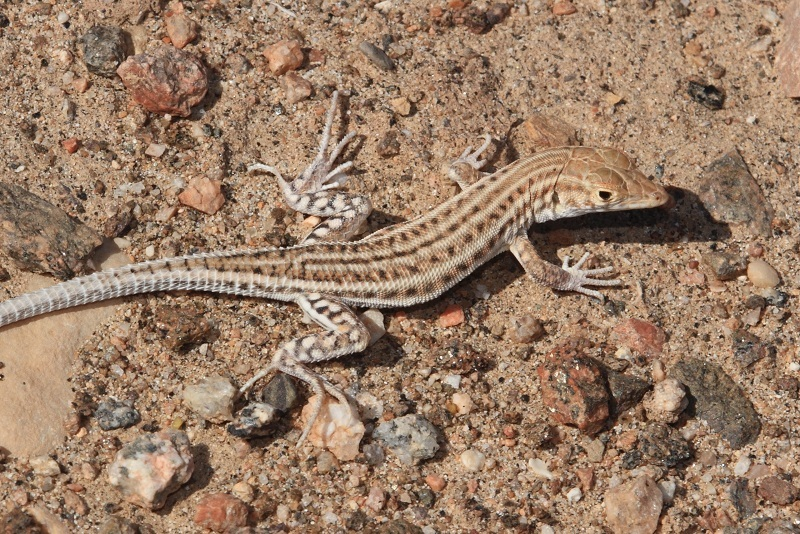

Conservation status
- Vulnerable (IUCN 3.1)

Scientific classification
- Kingdom: Animalia
- Phylum: Chordata
- Class: Reptilia
- Order: Squamata
- Family: Lacertidae
- Genus: Acanthodactylus
- Species: A. felicis

Binomial name
- Acanthodactylus felicis Arnold, 1980

= Acanthodactylus felicis =

Species of lizard

Acanthodactylus felicis, also known commonly as the cat fringe-fingered lizard or the South Arabian fringe-toed lizard, is a species of lizard in the family Lacertidae. The species is endemic to the Arabian Peninsula.

== Etymology ==
The specific name, felicis, refers to Arabia Felix, the Latin name for South Arabia.

== Geographic range ==
A. felicis is found in Yemen and Oman.

== Reproduction ==
A. felicis is oviparous.
