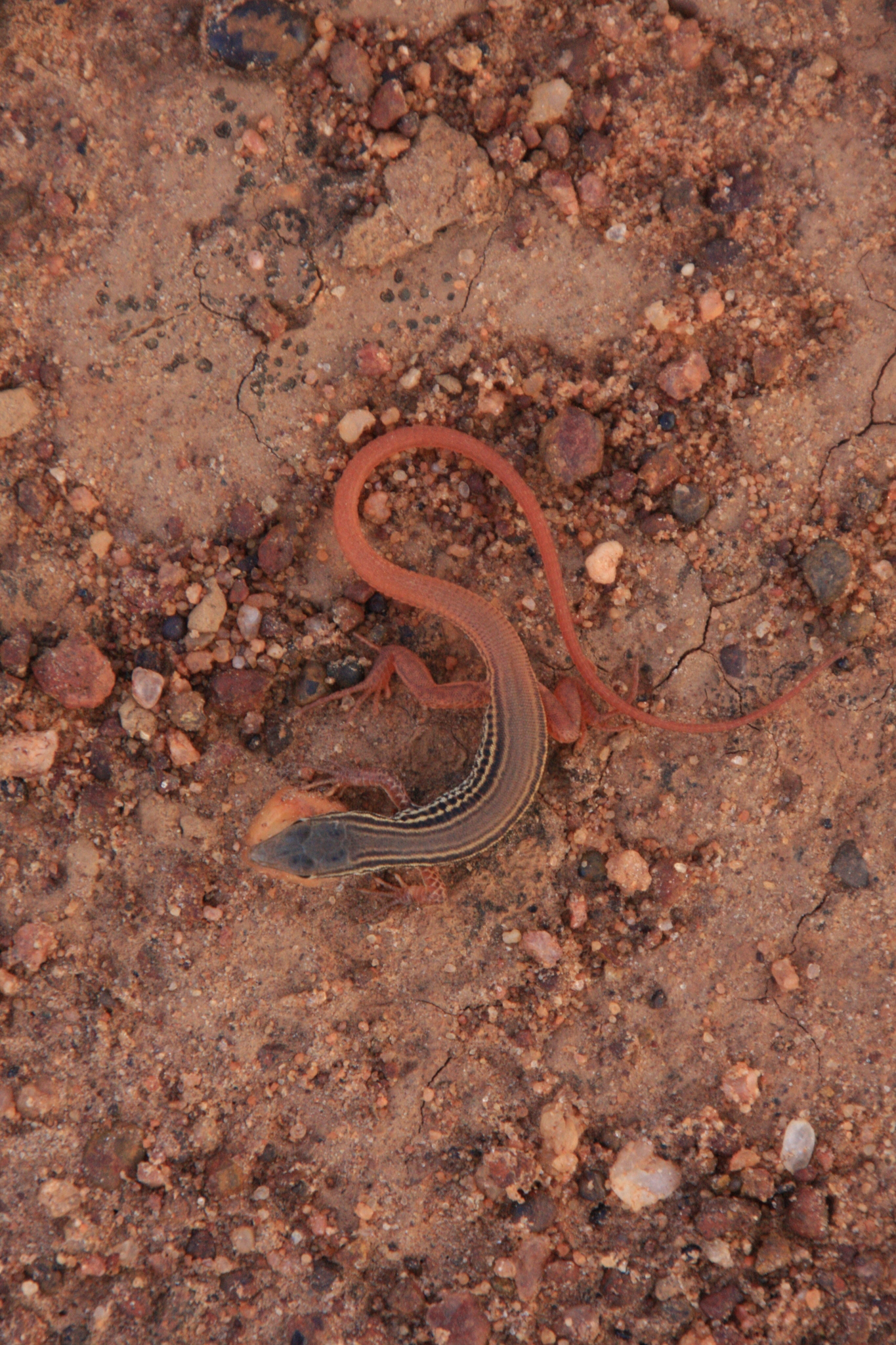

Conservation status
- Least Concern (IUCN 3.1)

Scientific classification
- Kingdom: Animalia
- Phylum: Chordata
- Class: Reptilia
- Order: Squamata
- Family: Lacertidae
- Genus: Acanthodactylus
- Species: A. guineensis

Binomial name
- Acanthodactylus guineensis (Boulenger, 1887)

Synonyms
- Eremias guineensis Boulenger, 1887; Acanthodactylus guineensis — Salvador, 1982

= Acanthodactylus guineensis =

Species of lizard

Acanthodactylus guineensis, commonly called the Guinea fringe-fingered lizard, is a species of lizard in the family Lacertidae. The species is endemic to West Africa and Central Africa.

== Geographic range ==
A. guineensis is found in Burkina Faso, Cameroon, Central African Republic, Ghana, Mali, Niger, and Nigeria.

== Reproduction ==
A. guineensis is oviparous.
