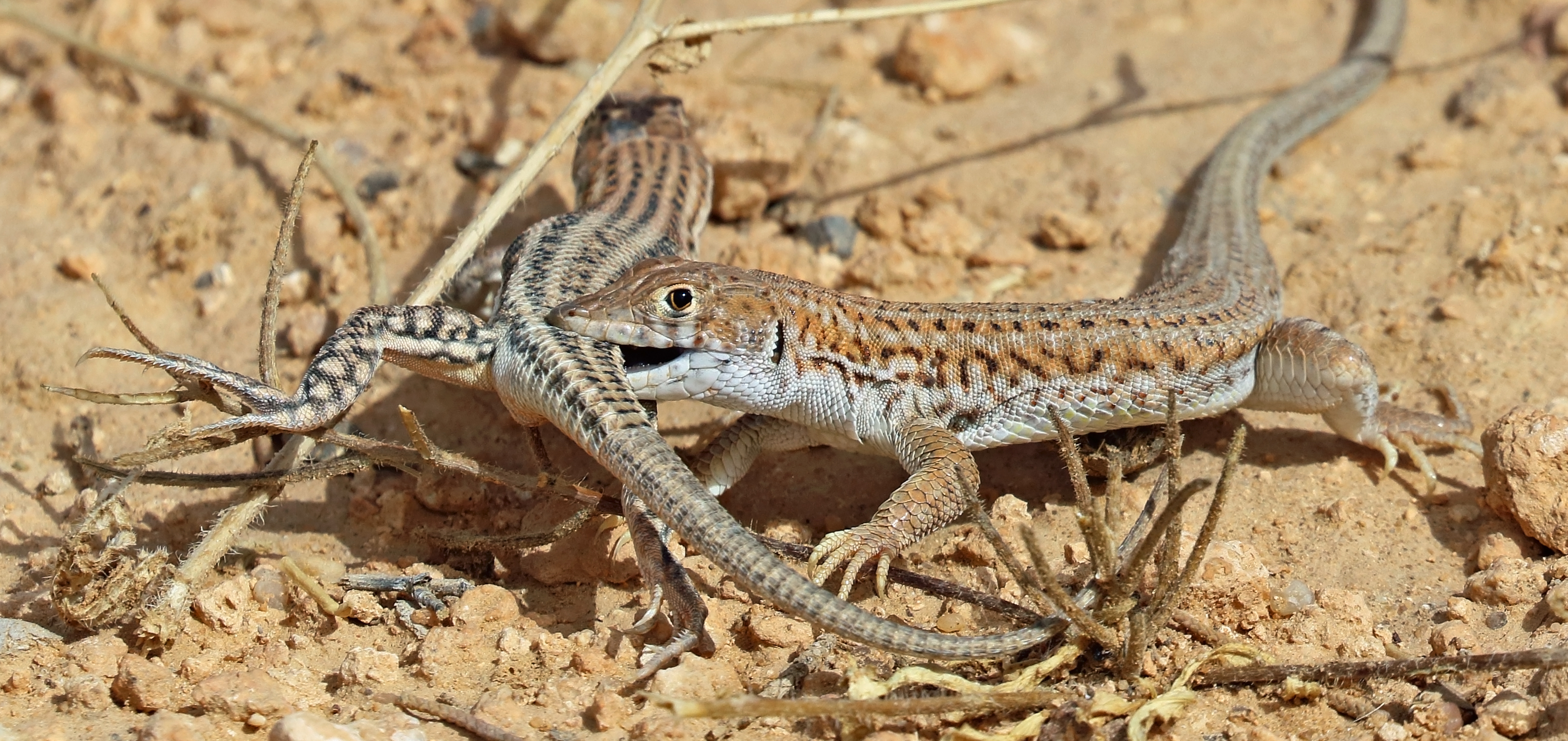
- A. boskianus asper in Jordan

Scientific classification
- Kingdom: Animalia
- Phylum: Chordata
- Class: Reptilia
- Order: Squamata
- Family: Lacertidae
- Genus: Acanthodactylus; Wiegmann, 1834

Species
- ca. 40. See text.

= Acanthodactylus =

Genus of lizards

Acanthodactylus is a genus of lacertid lizards, commonly referred to as fringe-fingered lizards, fringe-toed lizards (though the latter common name is also used for the New World lizard genus Uma), and spiny-toed lizards.

== Geographic range ==
The approximately 40 species in the genus Acanthodactylus are native to a wide area in North Africa, southern Europe and Western Asia; across the Sahara Desert, to the Iberian Peninsula, and east through the Arabian Peninsula, to Afghanistan and western India.

== Habitat ==
Though lizards of the genus Acanthodactylus prefer dry and sparsely vegetated regions, they are not strictly tied to an arid terrain; so it is not uncommon to come across them in various environments.

== Description ==
Members of the genus Acanthodactylus possess the following combination of traits:

- Lacking occipital scales,
- Flat ventral scales,
- Fingers with three or four series of scales,
- Toes with comb-like projections,
- Femoral pores present,
- Parietal foramen present.

The coloration and pattern of spots of Acanthodactylus is extremely variable, so it is unsurprising that zoologists have, at one time or another, classified every variety as a separate species.

== Behavior ==
Every saurian of the genus Acanthodactylus is very aggressive and gets continuously involved in skirmishes with other members of its species. The males strenuously defend the borders of their territories.

== Reproduction ==
Acanthodactylus are oviparous. The number of eggs in a clutch ranges from 3 to 7. The total length of a sexually mature adult of the genus is, on average, 18 to 20 cm (7.1 to 7.9 in).

== Classification ==
Genus Acanthodactylus

- Acanthodactylus aegyptius S. Baha El Din, 2007
- Acanthodactylus ahmaddisii Y. Werner, 2004
- Acanthodactylus arabicus Boulenger, 1918 - Arabian fringe-fingered lizard
- Acanthodactylus aureus Günther, 1903 - golden fringe-fingered lizard
- Acanthodactylus bedriagai Lataste, 1881 – Bedriaga's fringe-fingered lizard
- Acanthodactylus beershebensis Moravec et al., 1999 – Be'er Sheva fringe-fingered lizard
- Acanthodactylus blanci Doumergue, 1901 – Blanc's fringe-toed lizard
- Acanthodactylus blanfordii Boulenger, 1918 – Blanford's fringe-fingered lizard
- Acanthodactylus boskianus (Daudin, 1802) – Bosc's fringe-toed lizard
- Acanthodactylus boueti Chabanaud, 1917 – Chabanaud's fringe-fingered lizard
- Acanthodactylus busacki Salvador, 1982 – Busack's fringe-fingered lizard
- Acanthodactylus cantoris Günther, 1864 – Indian fringe-fingered lizard
- Acanthodactylus dumerilii (Milne-Edwards, 1829) – Duméril’s fringe-fingered lizard
- Acanthodactylus erythrurus (Schinz, 1833) – spiny-footed lizard
- Acanthodactylus felicis Arnold, 1980 – cat fringe-fingered lizard, South Arabian fringe-toed lizard
- Acanthodactylus gongrorhynchatus Leviton & S.C. Anderson, 1967 – Saudi fringe-fingered lizard
- Acanthodactylus grandis Boulenger, 1909 – giant fringe-fingered lizard
- Acanthodactylus guineensis (Boulenger, 1887) – Guinea fringe-fingered lizard
- Acanthodactylus haasi Leviton & S.C. Anderson, 1967 – Haas's fringe-fingered lizard, Haas's fringe-toed lizard
- Acanthodactylus hardyi Haas, 1957 – Hardy’s fringe-fingered lizard
- Acanthodactylus harranensis Baran et al., 2005 – Harran fringe-toed lizard
- Acanthodactylus ilgazi Kurnaz & Şahin, 2021
- Acanthodactylus khamirensis Heidari et al., 2013
- Acanthodactylus lacrymae Miralles et al., 2020
- Acanthodactylus longipes Boulenger, 1918 - Miralles – long fringe-fingered lizard
- Acanthodactylus maculatus (Gray, 1838) – spotted fringe-fingered lizard
- Acanthodactylus margaritae Tamar, Geniez, Brito, & Crochet, 2017
- Acanthodactylus masirae Arnold, 1980 - Masira fringe-fingered lizard
- Acanthodactylus micropholis Blanford, 1874 - yellowtail fringe-fingered lizard
- Acanthodactylus montanus Miralles et al., 2020
- Acanthodactylus nilsoni Rastegar-Pouyani, 1998 - Nilson's spiny-toed lizard
- Acanthodactylus opheodurus Arnold, 1980 - Arnold's fringe-fingered lizard, snake-tailed fringe-toed lizard
- Acanthodactylus orientalis Angel, 1936
- Acanthodactylus pardalis (Lichtenstein, 1823) – leopard fringe-fingered lizard, Egyptian fringe-fingered lizard
- Acanthodactylus robustus F. Werner, 1929 - robust fringe-fingered lizard
- Acanthodactylus savignyi (Audouin, 1809) – Savigny's fringe-fingered lizard
- Acanthodactylus schmidti Haas, 1957 - Schmidt's fringe-fingered lizard, Schmidt's fringe-toed lizard
- Acanthodactylus schreiberi Boulenger, 1878 – Schreiber's fringe-fingered lizard
- Acanthodactylus scutellatus (Audouin, 1827) -Nidua fringe-fingered lizard
- Acanthodactylus spinicauda Doumergue, 1901 – Doumergue's fringe-fingered lizard
- Acanthodactylus taghitensis Geniez & Foucart, 1995
- Acanthodactylus tilburyi Arnold, 1986 - Tilbury's fringe-fingered lizard
- Acanthodactylus tristrami (Günther, 1864) - Lebanon fringe-fingered lizard
- Acanthodactylus yemenicus Salvador, 1982 - Yemen fringe-fingered lizard
- Acanthodactylus zagrosicus Mozaffari, Mohammadi, Saberi-Pirooz & Ahmadzadeh, 2021 - Zagrosian fringe-fingered lizard

Nota bene: A binomial authority in parentheses indicates that the species was originally described in a genus other than Acanthodactylus.
