= Acanthodactylus arabicus =

Arabian fringe-fingered lizard

Conservation status
- Least Concern (IUCN 3.1)

Scientific classification
- Kingdom: Animalia
- Phylum: Chordata
- Class: Reptilia
- Order: Squamata
- Family: Lacertidae
- Genus: Acanthodactylus
- Species: A. arabicus

Binomial name
- Acanthodactylus arabicus Boulenger, 1918

Synonyms
- Acanthodactylus cantoris Var. arabicus Boulenger, 1918; Acanthodactylus arabicus — Salvador, 1982

Species of lizard

Acanthodactylus arabicus, commonly called the Arabian fringe-fingered lizard, is a species of lizard in the family Lacertidae. The species is endemic to southern Yemen.

== Habitat ==
A. arabicus is a common species inhabiting deserts and dry shrublands with sandy substrates.

== Reproduction ==
A. arabicus is oviparous.
