= Acanthodactylus khamirensis =

Scientific classification
- Kingdom: Animalia
- Phylum: Chordata
- Class: Reptilia
- Order: Squamata
- Family: Lacertidae
- Genus: Acanthodactylus
- Species: A. khamirensis

Binomial name
- Acanthodactylus khamirensis Heidari, N. Rastegar-Pouyani, E. Rastegar-Pouyani & Rajabizadeh, 2013

Species of lizard

Acanthodactylus khamirensis is a species of lizard in the family Lacertidae. The species is endemic to Iran.

== Geographic range ==
A. khamirensis is found in Hormozgan Province in southern Iran.
