= Acanthodactylus lacrymae =

Conservation status
- Least Concern (IUCN 3.1)

Scientific classification
- Kingdom: Animalia
- Phylum: Chordata
- Class: Reptilia
- Order: Squamata
- Family: Lacertidae
- Genus: Acanthodactylus
- Species: A. lacrymae

Binomial name
- Acanthodactylus lacrymae Miralles, Geniez, Beddek, Mendez-Aranda, Brito, Leblois, & Crochet, 2020

Species of lizard

Acanthodactylus lacrymae is a species of lizard in the family Lacertidae. The species is endemic to Morocco.
