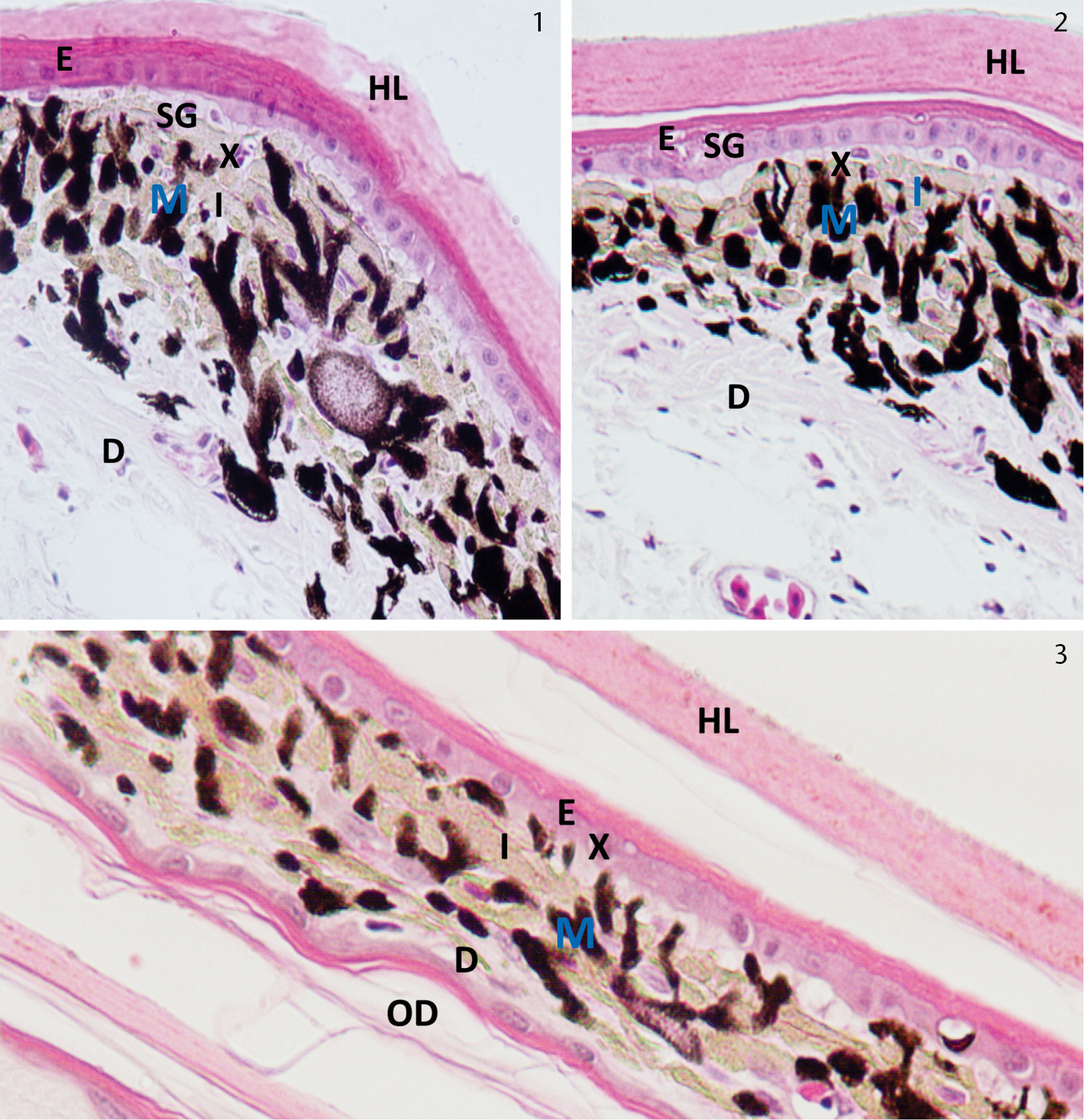

Conservation status
- Least Concern (IUCN 3.1)

Scientific classification
- Kingdom: Animalia
- Phylum: Chordata
- Class: Reptilia
- Order: Squamata
- Family: Lacertidae
- Genus: Acanthodactylus
- Species: A. orientalis

Binomial name
- Acanthodactylus orientalis Angel, 1936

Synonyms
- Acanthodactylus tristrami orientalis Angel, 1936; Acanthodactylus tristrami iracensis Schmidt, 1939; Acanthodactylus orientalis — Arnold, 1986

= Acanthodactylus orientalis =

Species of lizard

Acanthodactylus orientalis is a species of lizard in the family Lacertidae. The species is endemic to Western Asia.

== Geographic range ==
A. orientalis is found in Iraq, Saudi Arabia, and Syria.

== Reproduction ==
A. orientalis is oviparous.
