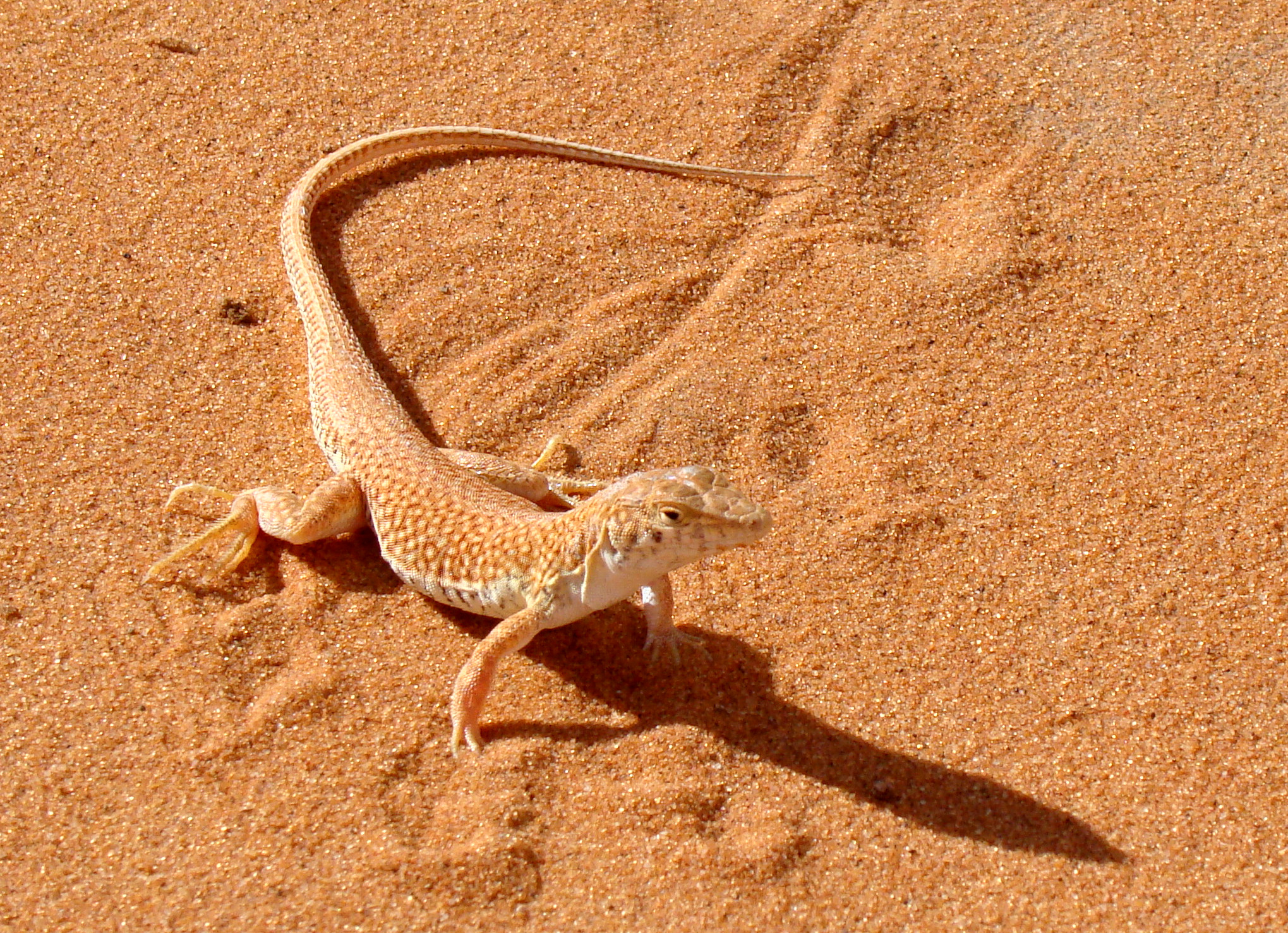

Conservation status
- Least Concern (IUCN 3.1)

Scientific classification
- Kingdom: Animalia
- Phylum: Chordata
- Class: Reptilia
- Order: Squamata
- Family: Lacertidae
- Genus: Acanthodactylus
- Species: A. aureus

Binomial name
- Acanthodactylus aureus Günther, 1903

Synonyms
- Acanthodactylus scutellatus aureus Günther, 1903; Acanthodactylus inornatus aureus — Bons & Girot, 1964; Acanthodactylus aureus — Salvador, 1982

= Acanthodactylus aureus =

Golden fringe-fingered lizard

Species of lizard

Acanthodactylus aureus, commonly called the golden fringe-fingered lizard, is a species of lizard in the family Lacertidae. The species is endemic to northwestern Africa.

== Geographic range ==
A. aureus is found in Mauritania, Morocco, Senegal, and Western Sahara.

== Reproduction ==
A. aureus is oviparous.
