= Acanthodactylus zagrosicus =

Scientific classification
- Kingdom: Animalia
- Phylum: Chordata
- Class: Reptilia
- Order: Squamata
- Family: Lacertidae
- Genus: Acanthodactylus
- Species: A. zagrosicus

Binomial name
- Acanthodactylus zagrosicus Mozaffari, Mohammadi, Saberi-Pirooz, & Ahmadzadeh, 2021

Species of lizard

Acanthodactylus zagrosicus, the Zagrosian fringe-fingered lizard, is a species of lizard in the family Lacertidae. The species is endemic to Iran.
