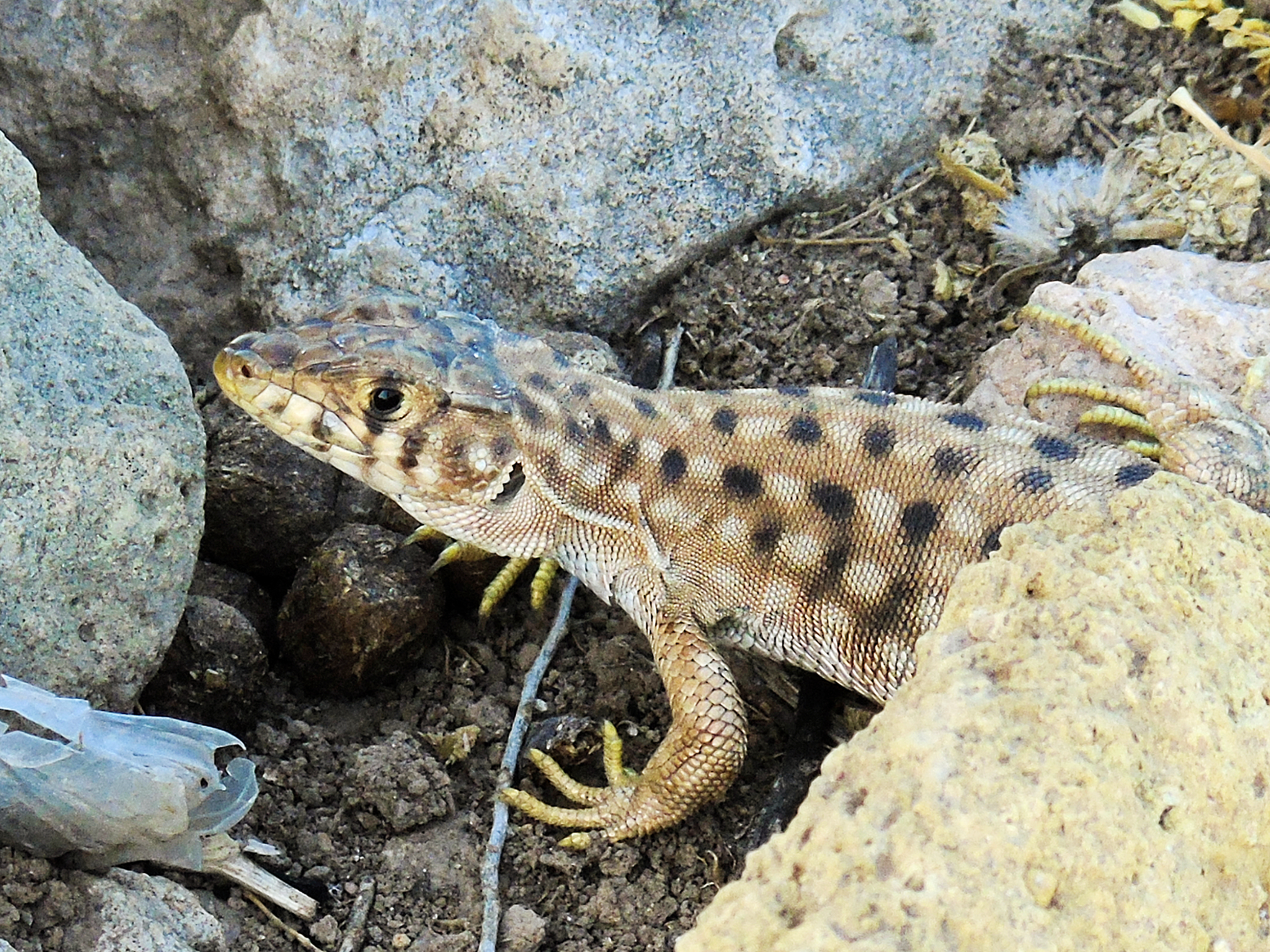

Conservation status
- Critically Endangered (IUCN 3.1)

Scientific classification
- Kingdom: Animalia
- Phylum: Chordata
- Class: Reptilia
- Order: Squamata
- Family: Lacertidae
- Genus: Acanthodactylus
- Species: A. harranensis

Binomial name
- Acanthodactylus harranensis Baran, Kumlutaş, Lanza, Sindaco, Ilgaz, Avci, Crucitti, 2005

= Acanthodactylus harranensis =

Species of lizard

Acanthodactylus harranensis, commonly called the Harran fringe-toed lizard, is a species of lizard in the family Lacertidae. The species is endemic to southeast Anatolia.

== Taxonomy ==
The Harran fringe-toed lizard was formally described as a species in 2005 based on a male specimen collected from Harran, Turkey. It is named after the ancient town of Harran.

== Description ==
A. harranensis is a relatively large and stout-bodied Acanthodactylus, with a snout–vent length of 76.5–94.8 mm. The tail is more than 1.5 times the body length. The dorsal pattern consists of irregular longitudinal dark and light stripes or, in juveniles, a series of spots.

== Distribution and habitat ==
A. harranensis is native to Turkey, and is known only from the ruins of the ancient city of Harran. It may also occur in Syria and Iraq. The natural habitat of A. harranensis is in rocky areas, including the ruins of the ancient university at Harran. The surroundings of the ruins are typically hardened grey sand interspersed with sedimentary rock, with steppe vegetation consisting of short shrubs less than half a metre tall. Harran fringe-toed lizards can be observed running on the ground or seeking shelter in Peganum harmala roots. The elevation at which the species occurs is around 400 m.

== Ecology ==
A. harranensis is oviparous.

== Conservation ==
The Harran fringe-toed lizard is listed as being critically endangered on the IUCN Red List due to its tiny range and ongoing habitat degradation. The species has a total range of 3.6 square kilometres and does not inhabit intensively farmed areas surrounding the ruins. It is threatened by increases in tourism, ongoing excavation of the ruins, and overgrazing. There are believed to be less than 1,000 adult lizards living in the ruins.

== Bibliography ==
- Baran I, Kumlutas Y, Lanza B, Sindaco R, Ilgaz Ç, Avci A, Crucitti P (2005). Acanthodactylus harranensis, A New Species of Lizard from Southeastern Turkey (Reptilia: Sauria: Lacertidae). Bolletino Museo Regionale di Scienze Naturali, Torino 23 (1): 323–341.
