= Acanthodactylus gongrorhynchatus =

Conservation status
- Data Deficient (IUCN 3.1)

Scientific classification
- Kingdom: Animalia
- Phylum: Chordata
- Class: Reptilia
- Order: Squamata
- Family: Lacertidae
- Genus: Acanthodactylus
- Species: A. gongrorhynchatus

Binomial name
- Acanthodactylus gongrorhynchatus Leviton & S.C. Anderson, 1967

Species of lizard

Acanthodactylus gongrorhynchatus, also known commonly as the Saudi fringe-fingered lizard, is a species of lizard in the family Lacertidae. The species is endemic to the Arabian Peninsula.

== Geographic range ==
A. gongrorhynchatus is found in Saudi Arabia and the United Arab Emirates.

== Reproduction ==
A. gongrorhynchatus is oviparous.
