= Acanthodactylus nilsoni =

Nilson's spiny-toed lizard

Conservation status
- Data Deficient (IUCN 3.1)

Scientific classification
- Kingdom: Animalia
- Phylum: Chordata
- Class: Reptilia
- Order: Squamata
- Family: Lacertidae
- Genus: Acanthodactylus
- Species: A. nilsoni

Binomial name
- Acanthodactylus nilsoni N. Rastegar-Pouyani, 1998

Species of lizard

Acanthodactylus nilsoni, commonly called Nilson's spiny-toed lizard, is a species of lizard in the family Lacertidae. The species is endemic to Iran.

== Etymology ==
The specific name, nilsoni, is in honor of Swedish herpetologist Göran Nilson (born 1948).

== Geographic distribution ==
Acanthodactylus nilsoni is found in Kermanshah Province, western Iran.

== Habitat ==
The preferred natural habitats of Acanthodactylus nilsoni are grassland and shrubland, at elevations up to 285 m (935 ft).

== Description ==
Acanthodactylus nilsoni is medium-sized for its genus, with a maximum snout-to-vent length (SVL) of 7.4 cm (2.9 in), and a maximum tail length of 16.5 cm (6.5 in).

== Behavior ==
Acanthodactylus nilsoni is terrestrial.

== Reproduction ==
Acanthodactylus nilsoni is oviparous.
