= Acanthodactylus tristrami =

Lebanon fringe-fingered lizard

Conservation status
- Least Concern (IUCN 3.1)

Scientific classification
- Kingdom: Animalia
- Phylum: Chordata
- Class: Reptilia
- Order: Squamata
- Family: Lacertidae
- Genus: Acanthodactylus
- Species: A. tristrami

Binomial name
- Acanthodactylus tristrami (Günther, 1864)

Synonyms
- Zootoca tristrami Günther, 1864; Acanthodactylus dorsalis W. Peters, 1869; Lacerta tristrami — Boettger, 1880; Acanthodactylus tristrami — Boulenger, 1881

Species of lizard

Acanthodactylus tristrami, commonly called the Lebanon fringe-fingered lizard and Tristram's spiny-footed lizard, is a species of lizard in the family Lacertidae. The species is endemic to the Middle East.

== Etymology ==
The specific name, tristrami, is in honor of Canon Henry Baker Tristram, who was an English naturalist and Anglican priest.

== Geographic range ==
A. tristrami is found in Iraq, Jordan, Lebanon, and Syria

== Habitat ==
The preferred habitat of A. tristrami is shrubland.

== Reproduction ==
- A. tristrami is oviparous.
