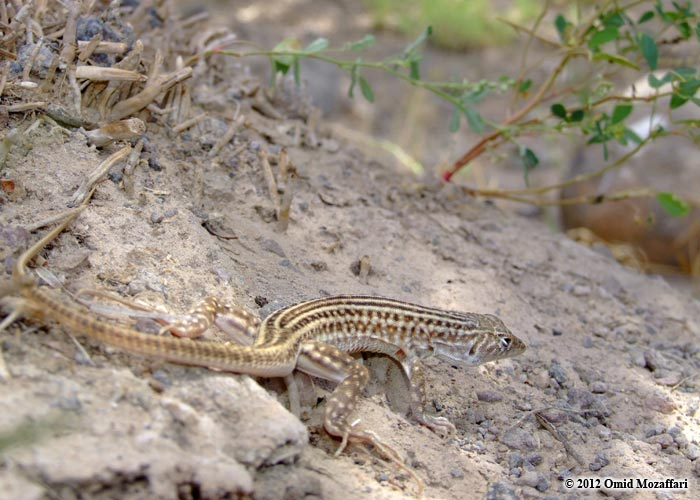

Conservation status
- Least Concern (IUCN 3.1)

Scientific classification
- Kingdom: Animalia
- Phylum: Chordata
- Class: Reptilia
- Order: Squamata
- Family: Lacertidae
- Genus: Acanthodactylus
- Species: A. cantoris

Binomial name
- Acanthodactylus cantoris Günther, 1864

= Indian fringe-fingered lizard =

Species of lizard

The Indian fringe-fingered lizard (Acanthodactylus cantoris), also known commonly as the Indian fringe-toed lizard, is a species of lizard in the family Lacertidae. The species is endemic to Asia.

== Etymology ==
The specific name, cantoris, is in honor of Danish zoologist Theodore Edward Cantor.

== Description ==
A cantoris has the following characters. Snout acutely pointed. Four supraoculars; subocular not reaching the lip; temporal scales keeled; front edge of the ear usually rather feebly, but distinctly, denticulated. Dorsal scales strongly keeled, very much larger on the hinder part of the back than between the shoulders and on the flanks, rhomboidal, strongly imbricate; 10 to 16 large keeled scales on a transverse line between the hind limbs. Ventral plates usually broader than long, in straight longitudinal and slightly angular transverse series; 12 or 14 plates across the middle of the body. Usually a median series of broad pre-anals, the posterior largest. The hind limb reaches the ear or the eye. 17 to 23 femoral pores on each side. Digital denticulations strong, usually as long as the diameter of the corresponding part of the toe, much more developed on the outer than on the inner edge of the fourth toe. Upper caudal scales strongly keeled; basal subcaudals smooth or obtusely keeled.

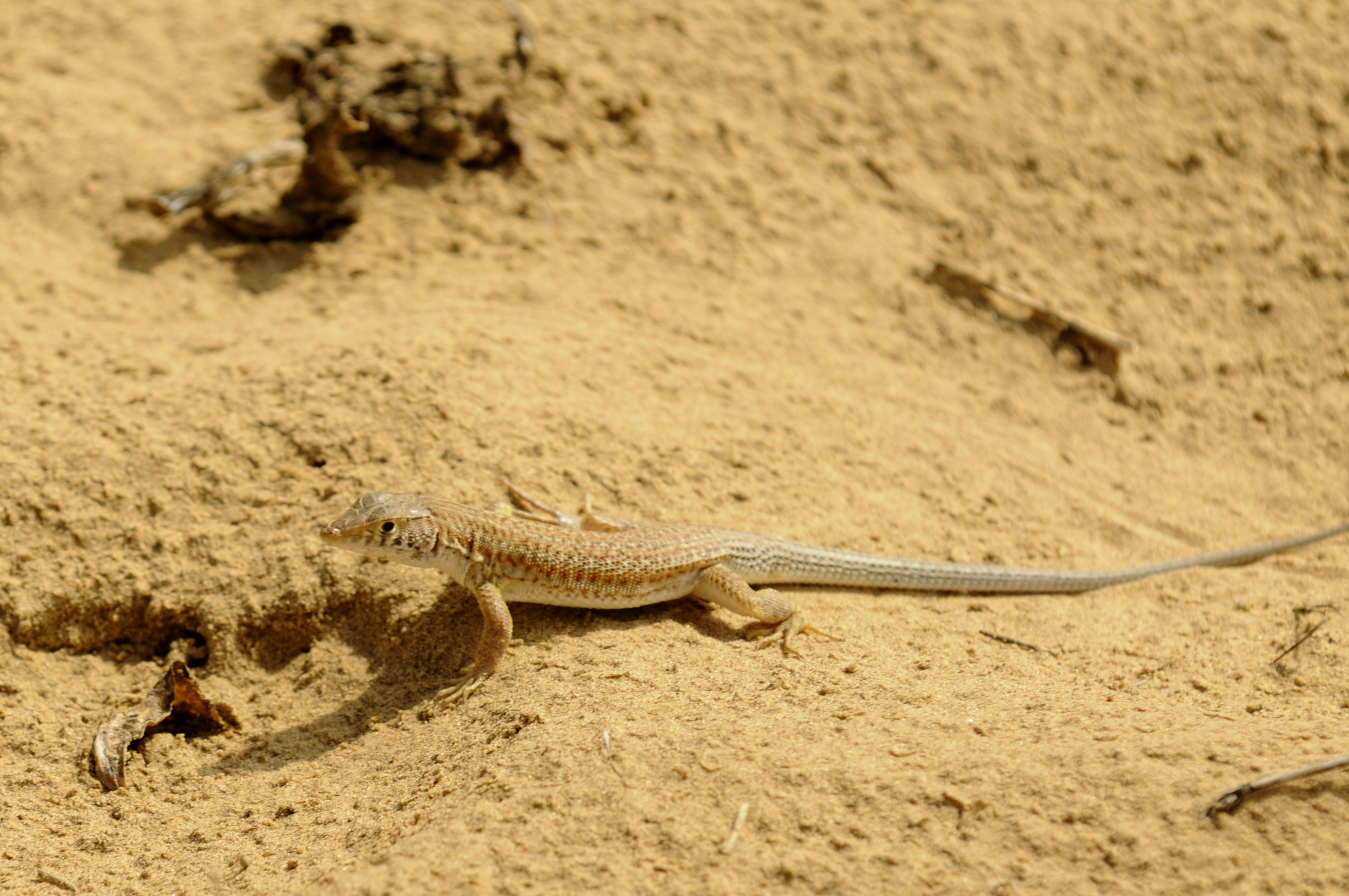
Indian fringe-toed lizard or Indian fringe-fingered lizard in Rajasthan, India

Greyish or buff above, with or without small blackish spots; young with whitish longitudinal lines separated by blackish interspaces with series of round whitish spots, which markings gradually become more indistinct; tail pink in the young.

From snout to vent 2.75 inches (7.0 cm); tail 6 inches (15 cm).

== Geographic range ==
A cantoris is found in eastern Afghanistan, northwestern India (Gujarat, Punjab, Rajasthan, Uttar Pradesh), southwestern Iran, Jordan, and Pakistan.

Type locality: "Ramnuggar".

== Habitat ==
The preferred natural habitat of A. cantoris is sandy areas of desert and shrubland.

== Behavior ==
A terrestrial species, A. cantoris burrows in the sand at the roots of bushes for protection.

== Reproduction ==
A. cantoris is oviparous. Clutch size is two to four eggs, which hatch within three weeks of being laid.
