= Acanthodactylus hardyi =

Scientific classification
- Kingdom: Animalia
- Phylum: Chordata
- Class: Reptilia
- Order: Squamata
- Family: Lacertidae
- Genus: Acanthodactylus
- Species: A. hardyi

Binomial name
- Acanthodactylus hardyi G. Haas, 1957

Synonyms
- Acanthodactylus scutellatus hardyi G. Haas, 1957; Acanthodactylus hardyi — D.J. Harris & Arnold, 2000

Species of lizard

Acanthodactylus hardyi, known commonly as Hardy's fringe-fingered lizard or the Nidua fringe-fingered lizard, is a species of lizard in the family Lacertidae. The species is endemic to Western Asia.

== Etymology ==
The specific name, hardyi, is in honor of British entomologist J.E. Hardy who collected the holotype.

== Geographic range ==
A. hardyi is found in Iraq, Jordan, Kuwait, and Saudi Arabia.

== Reproduction ==
A. hardyi is oviparous.
