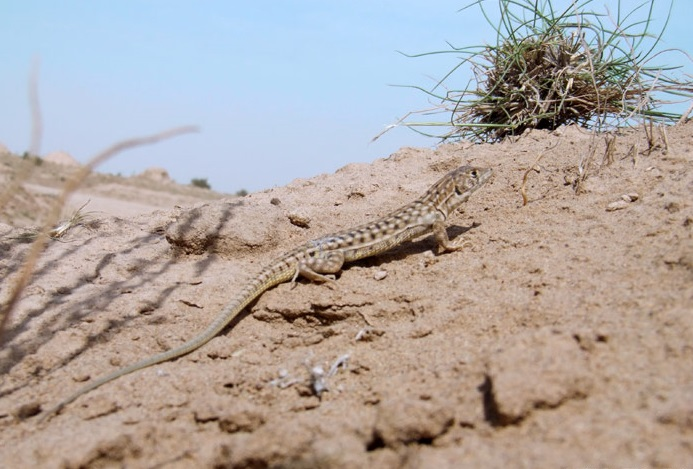

Conservation status
- Least Concern (IUCN 3.1)

Scientific classification
- Kingdom: Animalia
- Phylum: Chordata
- Class: Reptilia
- Order: Squamata
- Family: Lacertidae
- Genus: Acanthodactylus
- Species: A. grandis

Binomial name
- Acanthodactylus grandis Boulenger, 1909

Synonyms
- Acanthodactylus grandis Boulenger, 1909; Acanthodactylus fraseri Boulenger, 1918; Acanthodactylus grandis — Salvador, 1982

= Acanthodactylus grandis =

Species of lizard

Acanthodactylus grandis, commonly called the giant fringe-fingered lizard, is a species of lizard in the family Lacertidae. The species is endemic to Western Asia.

== Geographic range ==
A. grandis is found in Iran, Iraq, Jordan, Lebanon, Saudi Arabia, and Syria.

== Reproduction ==
A. grandis is oviparous.
