= Acanthodactylus robustus =

Conservation status
- Least Concern (IUCN 3.1)

Scientific classification
- Kingdom: Animalia
- Phylum: Chordata
- Class: Reptilia
- Order: Squamata
- Family: Lacertidae
- Genus: Acanthodactylus
- Species: A. robustus

Binomial name
- Acanthodactylus robustus F. Werner, 1929

Species of lizard

Acanthodactylus robustus, also known commonly as the robust fringe-fingered lizard and the robust fringe-toed lizard, is a species of lizard in the family Lacertidae. The species is endemic to the Middle East.

== Geographic range ==
A. robustus is found in Iraq, Jordan, Saudi Arabia, and Syria

== Reproduction ==
A. robustus is oviparous.
