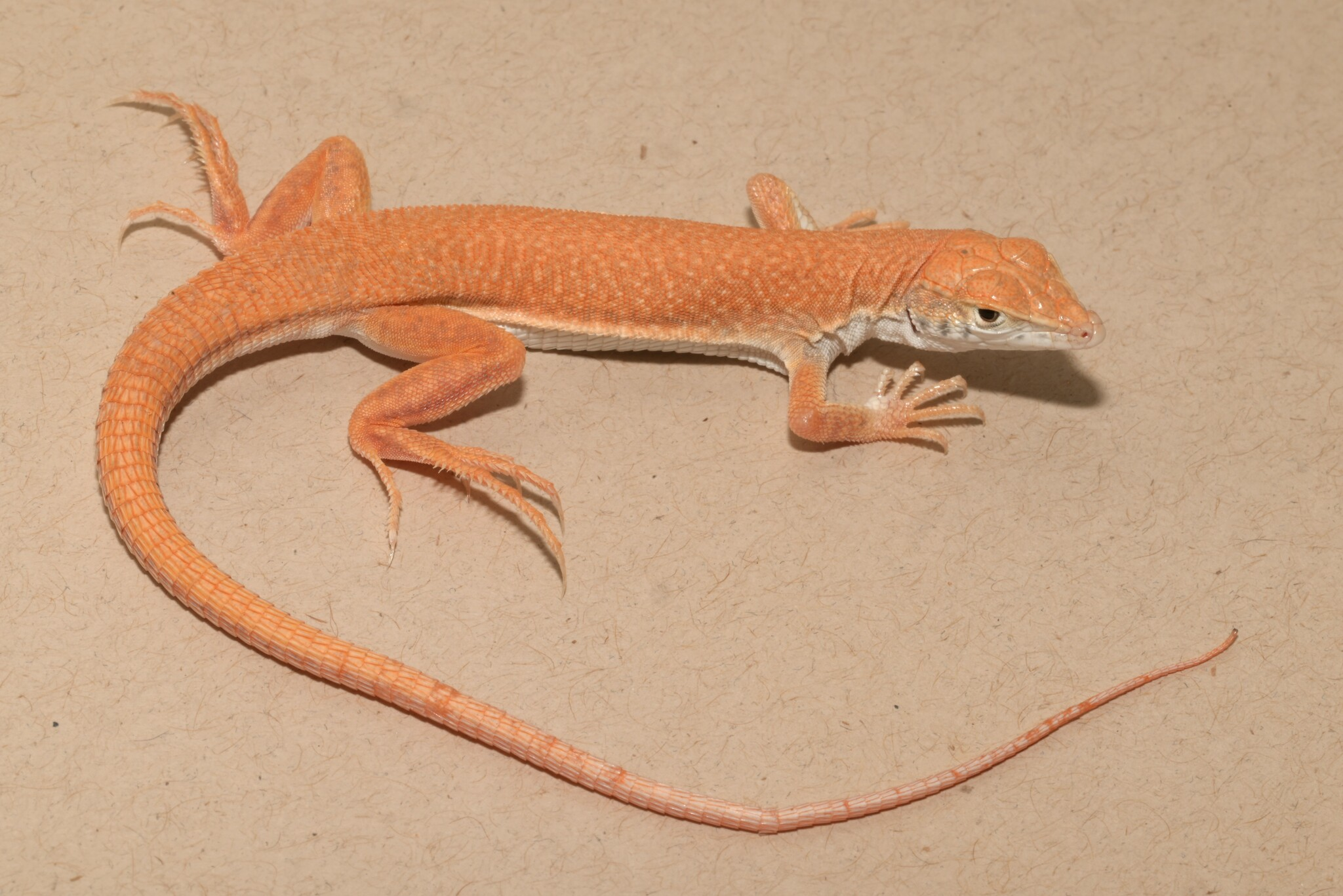

Conservation status
- Least Concern (IUCN 3.1)

Scientific classification
- Kingdom: Animalia
- Phylum: Chordata
- Class: Reptilia
- Order: Squamata
- Family: Lacertidae
- Genus: Acanthodactylus
- Species: A. tilburyi

Binomial name
- Acanthodactylus tilburyi Arnold, 1986

= Acanthodactylus tilburyi =

Species of lizard

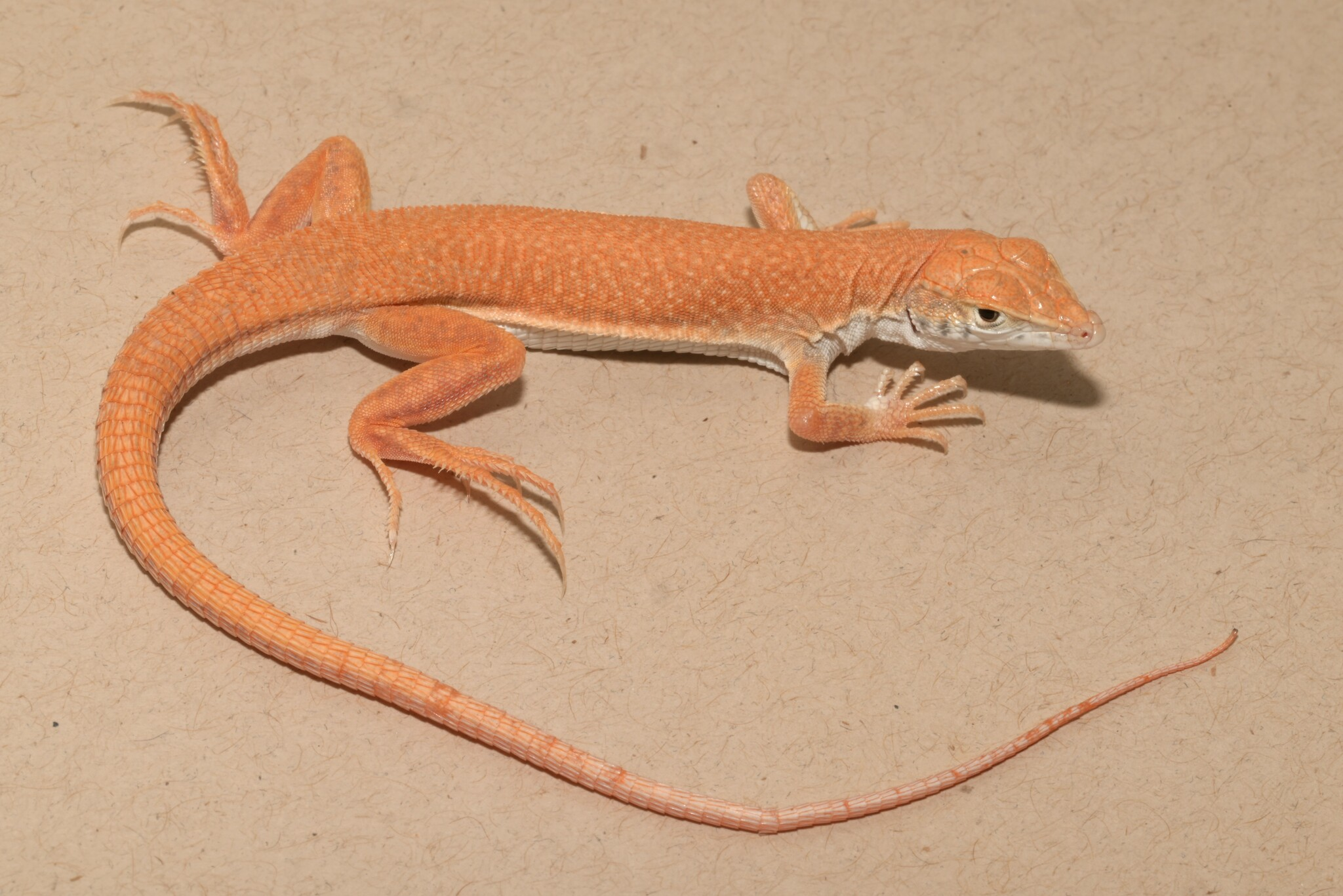
Acanthodactylus tilburyi, in Baqaa, Saudi Arabia

Acanthodactylus tilburyi, commonly known as Tilbury's fringe-fingered lizard, Tilbury's fringe-toed lizard, and Tilbury's spiny-footed lizard, is a species of lizard in the family Lacertidae. The species is endemic to the Middle East.

== Etymology ==
The specific name, tilburyi, is in honor of South African herpetologist Colin R. Tilbury.

== Geographic range ==
A. tilburyi is found in Jordan and Saudi Arabia.

== Habitat ==
The preferred habitat of A. tilburyi is desert.

== Reproduction ==
A. tilburyi is oviparous.
