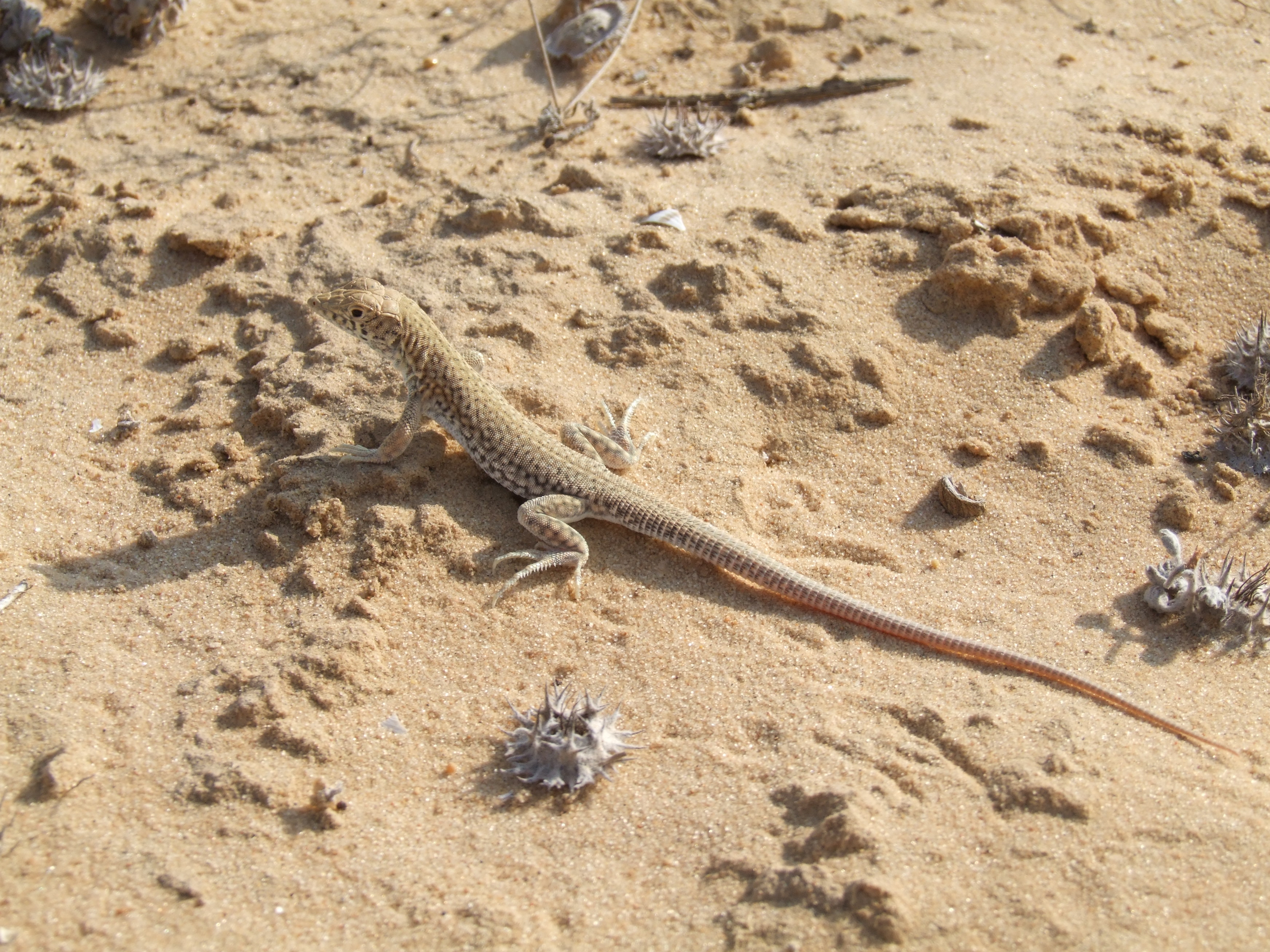

Conservation status
- Least Concern (IUCN 3.1)

Scientific classification
- Kingdom: Animalia
- Phylum: Chordata
- Class: Reptilia
- Order: Squamata
- Family: Lacertidae
- Genus: Acanthodactylus
- Species: A. scutellatus

Binomial name
- Acanthodactylus scutellatus (Audouin, 1827)

Synonyms
- Lacerta scutellata Audouin, 1827; Acanthodactylus scutellatus — A.M.C. Duméril & Bibron, 1839

= Acanthodactylus scutellatus =

Species of lizard

Acanthodactylus scutellatus, also known commonly as the Nidua fringe-fingered lizard or the Nidua fringe-toed lizard, is a species of lizard in the family Lacertidae. The species is endemic to northern Africa and the Middle East.

It is small in size, reaching up to 21 cm in total length, with the tail accounting for less than two-thirds of this length. Its weight usually does not exceed 10 g, and its head is pointed at the snout. The Nidua fringe-fingered lizard (Acanthodactylus scutellatus) possesses a distinctive feature that sets it apart from other members of its genus: its ventral scales (ventrals) are arranged in diagonal rows originating from the center of the belly and extending backward and outward. In contrast, other species within the genus feature ventral scales arranged in straight, longitudinal and transverse rows (a grid pattern).

The Nidua fringe-fingered lizard is diurnal and highly adept at burrowing into loose sand. Its burrows are shallow, serving as shelters during the night and throughout the hottest hours of summer days. Upon detecting a predator, it flees to the nearest available burrow, regardless of whether it dug it itself.

The breeding season begins in late winter. During this period, the male defends a territory surrounding his burrow, where he courts females to mate with while driving away rival males perceived as intruders. In the spring, the female lays a clutch of 3–6 elongated eggs with flexible shells. The juveniles hatch between June and August; at birth, they measure 7–8 cm in length and weigh approximately 0.5 g. In northern Sinai, juveniles of this size have been recorded as early as April.

== Geographic range ==
A. scutellatus is found in Algeria, Chad, Egypt, Iraq, Israel, Jordan, Kuwait, Libya, Mali, Mauritania, Niger, Saudi Arabia, Sudan, and Tunisia.

In Israel, the Acanthodactylus scutellatus inhabits the sands of the western Negev and the southern Coastal Plain, thriving in landscapes of shifting and semi-stabilized dunes. In these habitats, its range may overlap with other species of the genus Acanthodactylus. Historically, the species was also widespread further north in the areas of Herzliya and Shefayim; however, due to urbanization and habitat fragmentation, it has been displaced from these regions and largely replaced by the Acanthodactylus opheodurus

== Reproduction ==
A. scutellatus is oviparous.
