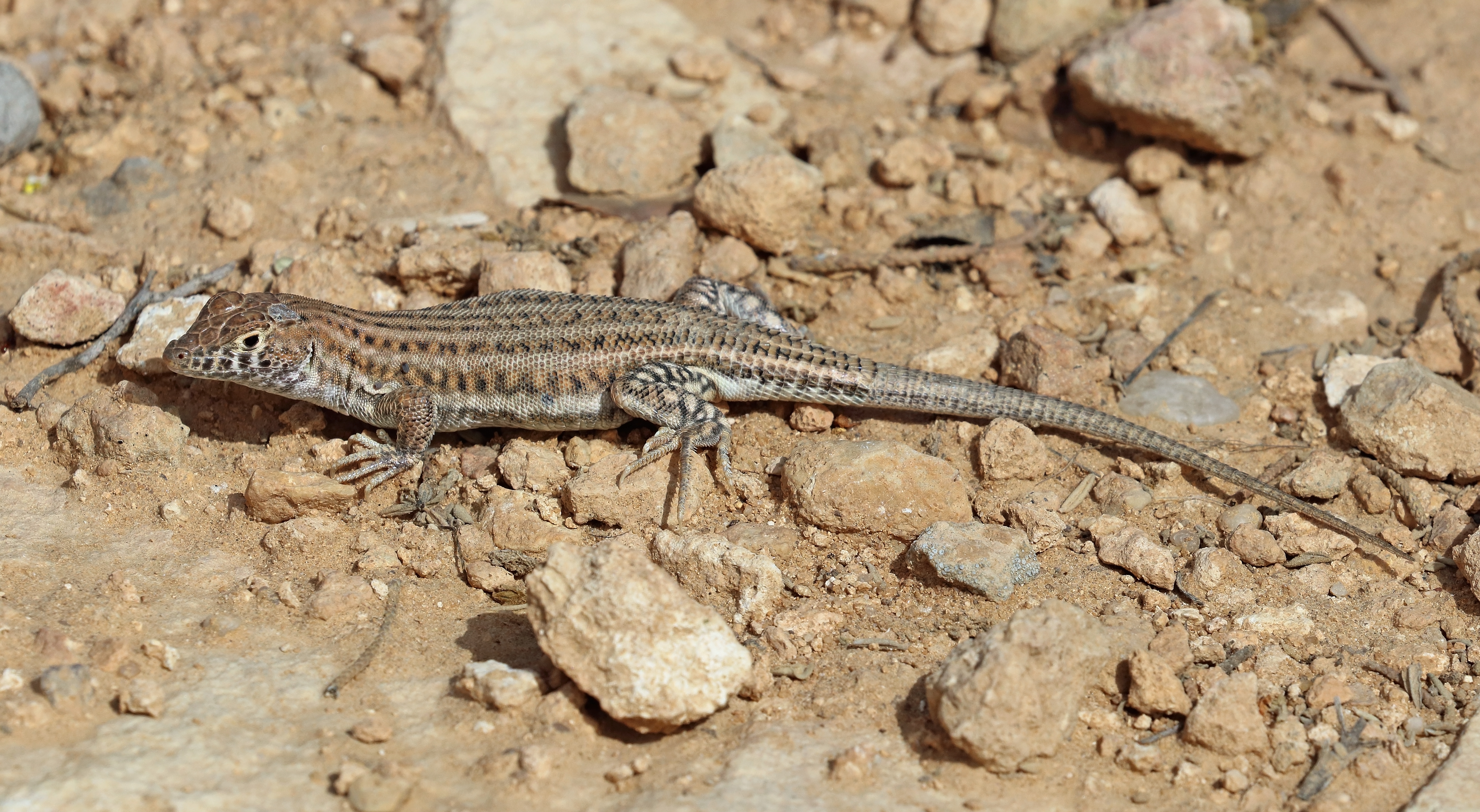
- Dana Biosphere Reserve, Jordan

Conservation status
- Least Concern (IUCN 3.1)

Scientific classification
- Kingdom: Animalia
- Phylum: Chordata
- Class: Reptilia
- Order: Squamata
- Family: Lacertidae
- Genus: Acanthodactylus
- Species: A. boskianus

Binomial name
- Acanthodactylus boskianus (Daudin, 1802)

Synonyms
- Lacerta boskiana Daudin, 1802; Lacerta aspera Audouin, 1829; Scapteira inaequalis Gray, 1838; Acanthodactylus boskianus — A.M.C. Duméril & Bibron, 1839

= Bosc's fringe-toed lizard =

Species of lizard

Bosc's fringe-toed lizard or Bosk's [sic] fringe-fingered lizard (Acanthodactylus boskianus) is a species of lizard in the family Lacertidae. The species is endemic to North Africa and Western Asia. Three subspecies are sometimes recognised; A. boskianus boskianus, from Lower Egypt; A. boskianus euphraticus from Iraq; and A. boskianus asper from the rest of the range; however this division is unsatisfactory because each subspecies has much variation and the differences between them are not consistent.

== Description ==
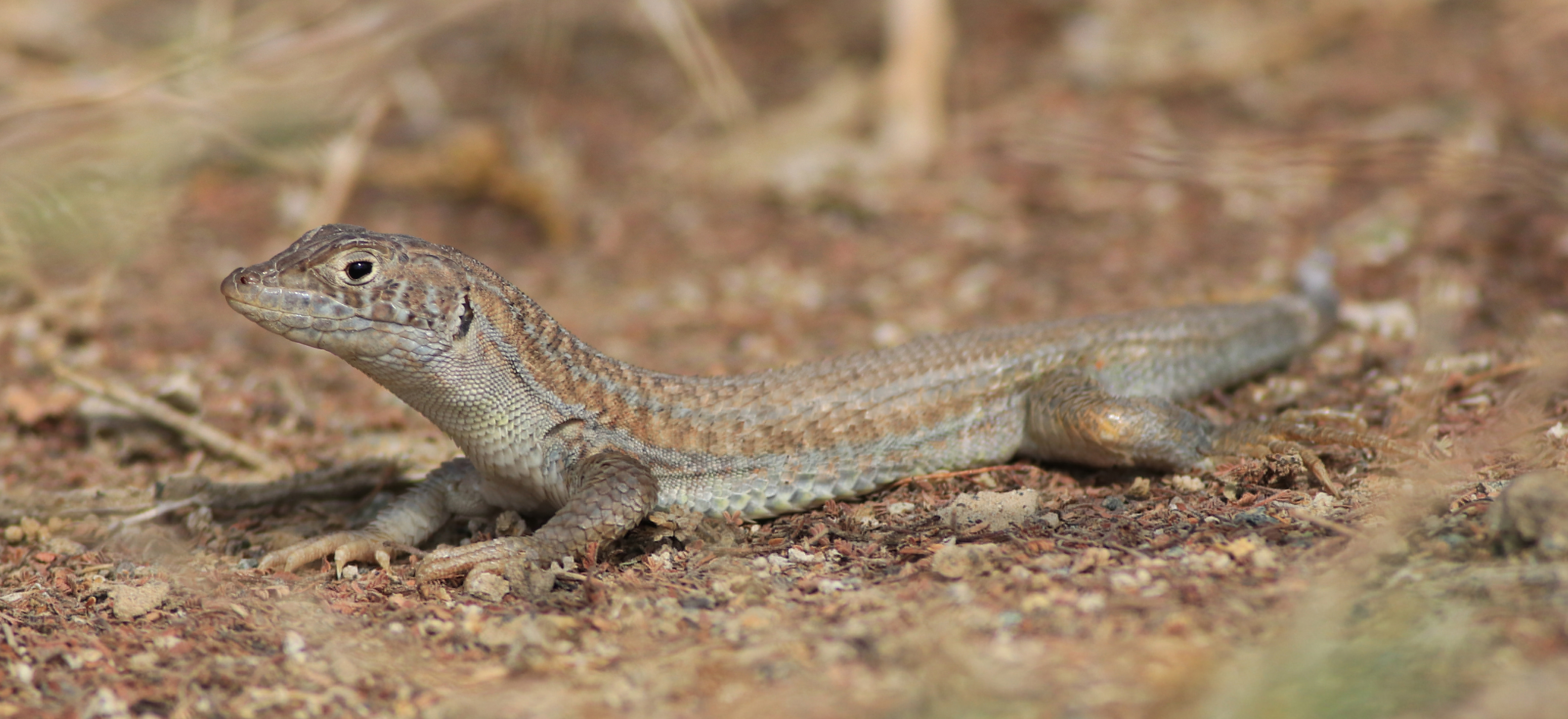
A male from United Arab Emirates

A. boskianus is a medium-sized lizard with a snout-to-vent length (SVL) of between 5 and 8 cm (2.0 and 3.1 in). Males are usually larger than females. The feet have long slender digits which are fringed. The dorsal surface is olive-grey with five longitudinal dark stripes, the middle one of which subdivides at the neck. The ventral surface is whitish, but in the female, the underside of the tail becomes suffused with red during the breeding season. In juveniles, the tail is blue.

== Distribution and habitat ==
A. boskianus is found in Algeria, Egypt, Eritrea, Ethiopia, Iran, Iraq, Israel, Jordan, Kuwait, Libya, Mali, Mauritania, Niger, Nigeria, Oman, Saudi Arabia, Sudan, Syria, southern Turkey, Tunisia, and the United Arab Emirates. It is one of the most common diurnal lizards over much of its range, and is found in a diversity of habitats, including coastal plains and cultivated areas, saltmarshes, oases and wadis, usually in areas with a light to moderate vegetation cover on sandy or gravelly substrates.

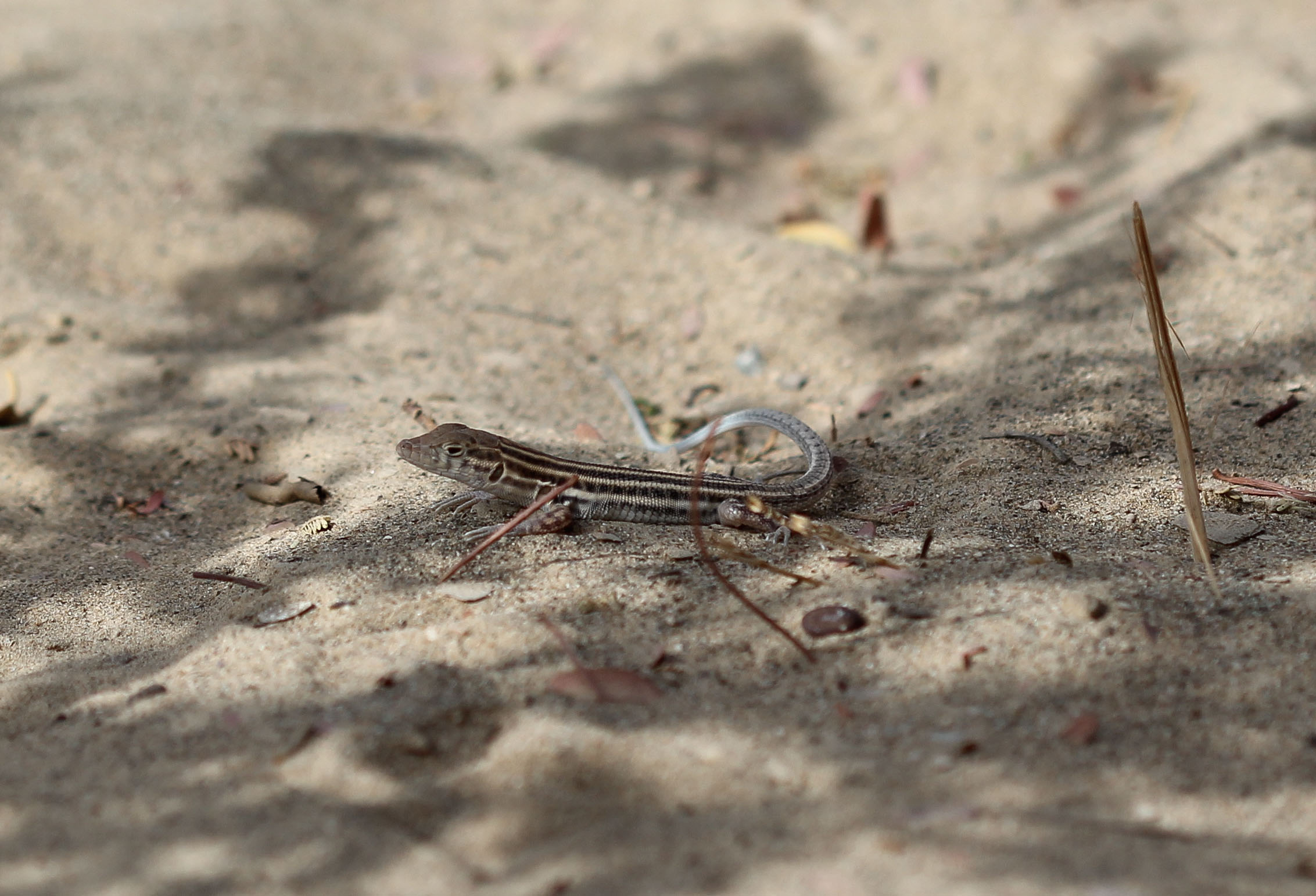
Juvenile of Bosc's fringe-toed lizard from United Arab Emirates

== Behavior ==
Bosc's fringe-toed lizard is a fast-moving lizard and a very active forager. Males are territorial and larger males, with larger head sizes are more successful than smaller males. Size is important in females as well, with an average clutch size of four oviductal eggs, and a range of two to seven, the number of eggs being carried being largely dependent on abdominal capacity. Certain chemicals present in the skin and in the exudate from the femoral glands may play a role in chemical communication, sex recognition and courtship behaviour. A. boskianus is oviparous.

== Gallery ==
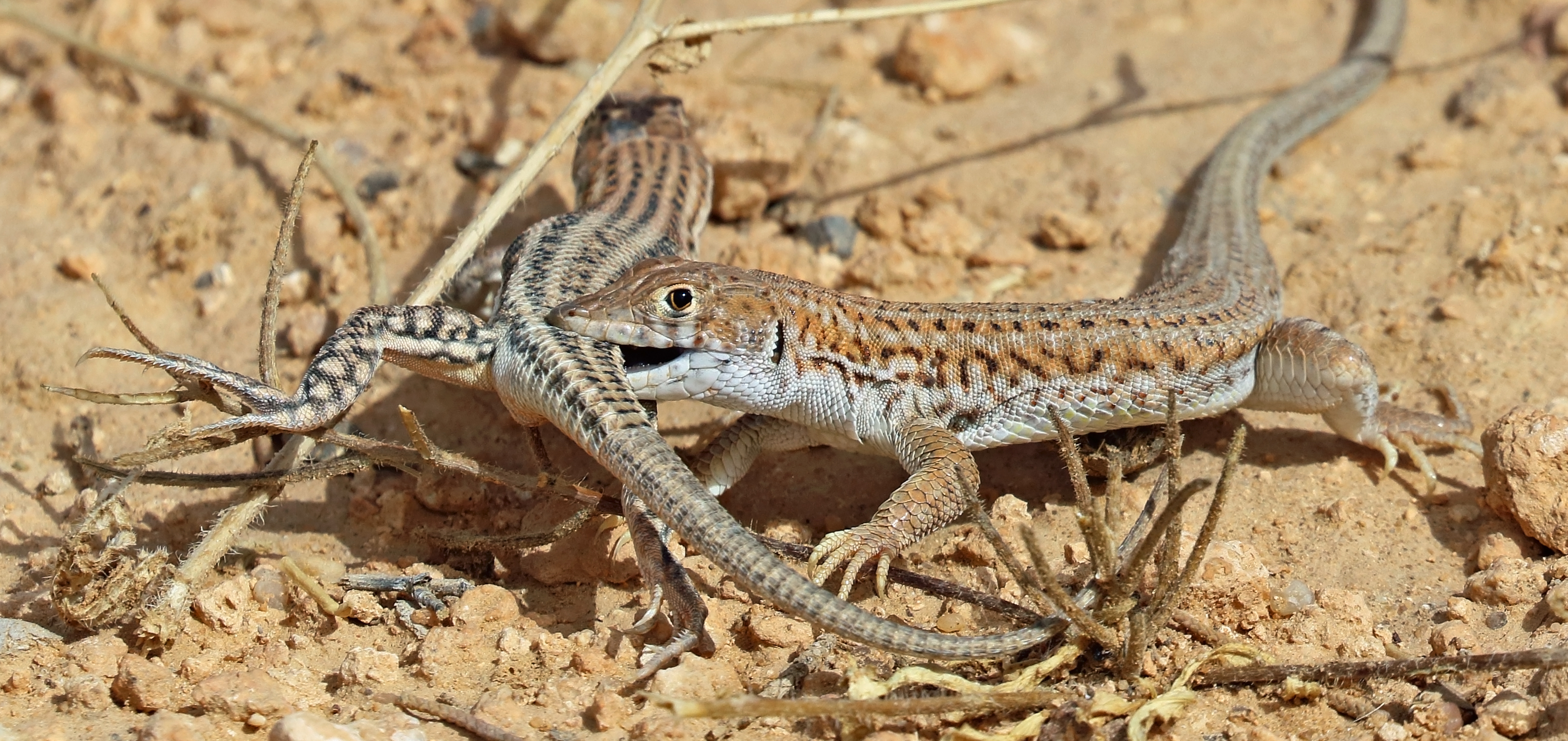
Love bite as part of courtship in A. boskianus

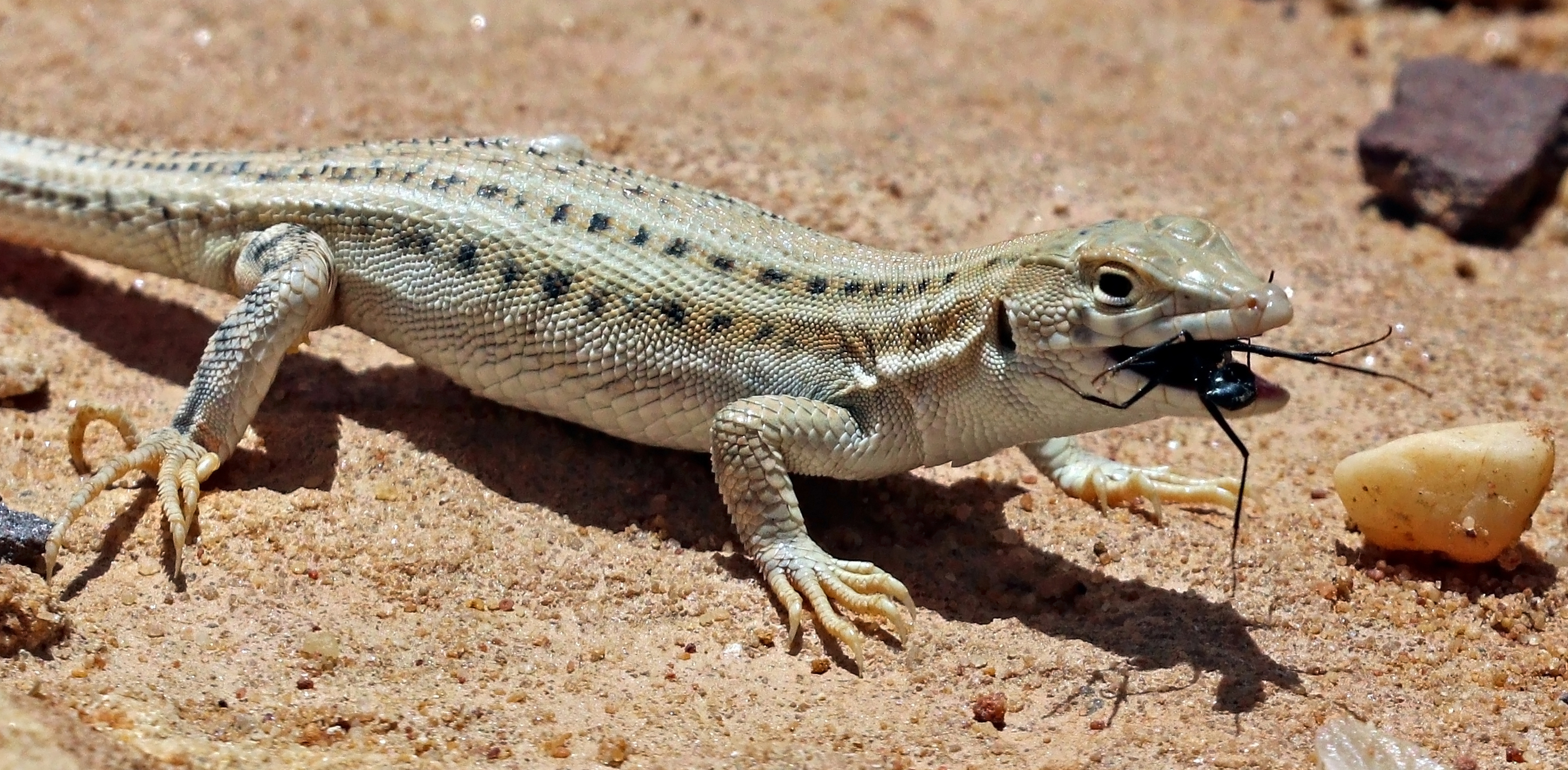
Juvenile A. boskianus eating an insect

== Etymology ==
Both the specific name, boskianus, and the common name, Bosc's fringe-toed lizard, are in honor of French naturalist Louis Augustin Guillaume Bosc.
