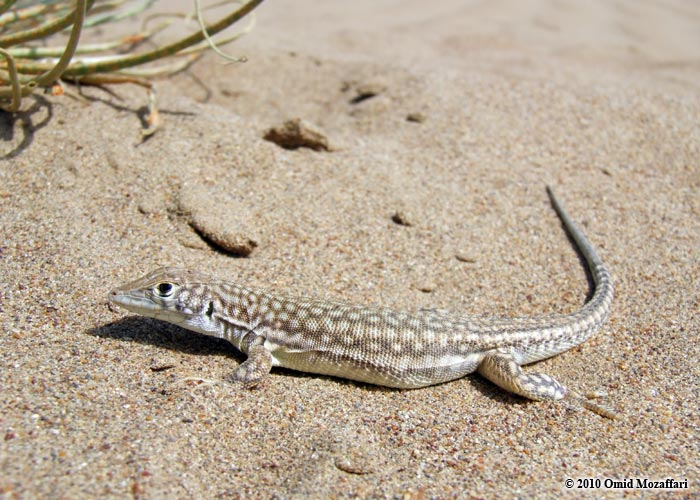

Conservation status
- Least Concern (IUCN 3.1)

Scientific classification
- Kingdom: Animalia
- Phylum: Chordata
- Class: Reptilia
- Order: Squamata
- Family: Lacertidae
- Genus: Acanthodactylus
- Species: A. schmidti

Binomial name
- Acanthodactylus schmidti G. Haas, 1957

Synonyms
- Acanthodactylus cantoris schmidti G. Haas, 1957; Acanthodactylus schmidti — Arnold, 1980

= Acanthodactylus schmidti =

Species of lizard

Acanthodactylus schmidti, also known commonly as Schmidt's fringe-fingered lizard or Schmidt's fringe-toed lizard, is a species of lizard in the family Lacertidae. The species is endemic to Western Asia.

== Etymology ==
The specific name, schmidti, is in honor of American herpetologist Karl Patterson Schmidt.

== Geographic range ==
Acanthodactylus schmidti is found in Iran, Iraq, Jordan, Kuwait, Oman, Qatar, Saudi Arabia, and United Arab Emirates.

== Habitat ==
The preferred natural habitat of A. schmidti is desert, at altitudes up to 1,000 m (3,300 ft).

== Description ==
Acanthodactylus schmidti differs from all other species in the "cantoris group" by having the scales on the sides of the posterior dorsum larger than those in the middle of the dorsum. The largest recorded specimen is a male with a snout-to-vent length (SVL) of 10.3 cm (4.1 in).

== Reproduction ==
Acanthodactylus schmidti is oviparous.

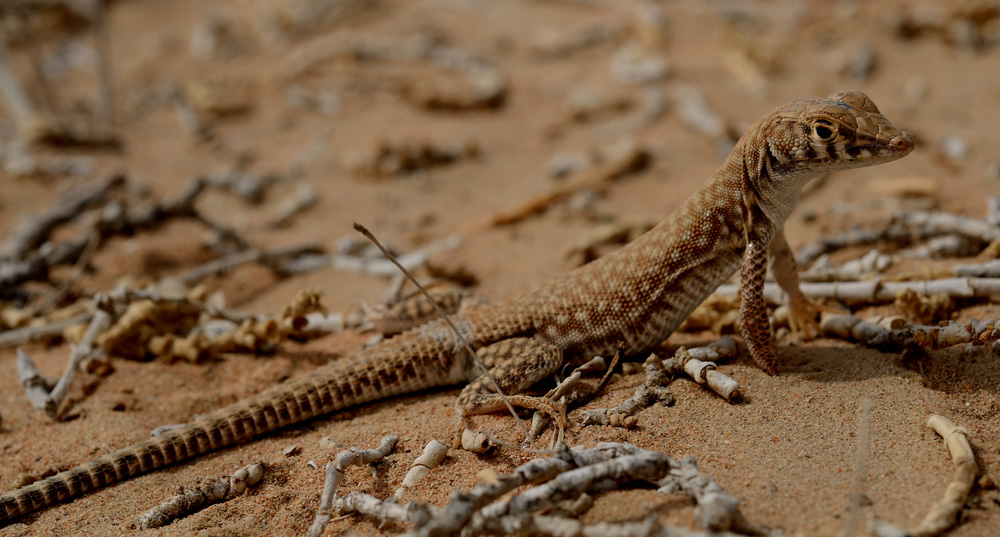
Acanthodactylus schmidti is looking for a female
