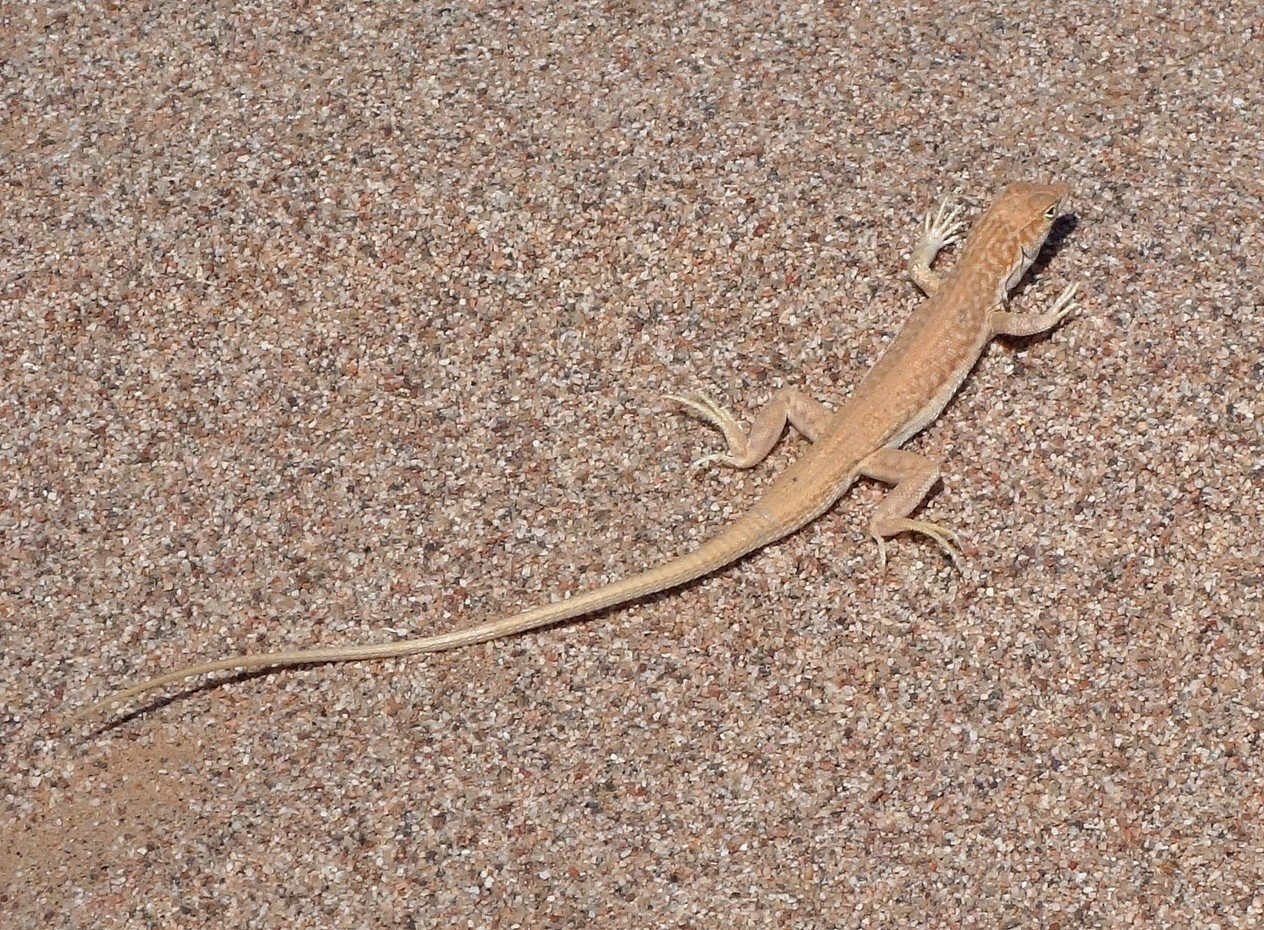

Conservation status
- Least Concern (IUCN 3.1)

Scientific classification
- Kingdom: Animalia
- Phylum: Chordata
- Class: Reptilia
- Order: Squamata
- Family: Lacertidae
- Genus: Acanthodactylus
- Species: A. opheodurus

Binomial name
- Acanthodactylus opheodurus Arnold, 1980

= Acanthodactylus opheodurus =

Species of lizard

Acanthodactylus opheodurus, also known commonly as Arnold's fringe-fingered lizard or the snake-tailed fringe-toed lizard, is a species of lizard in the family Lacertidae. The species is endemic to the Middle East.

== Geographic range ==
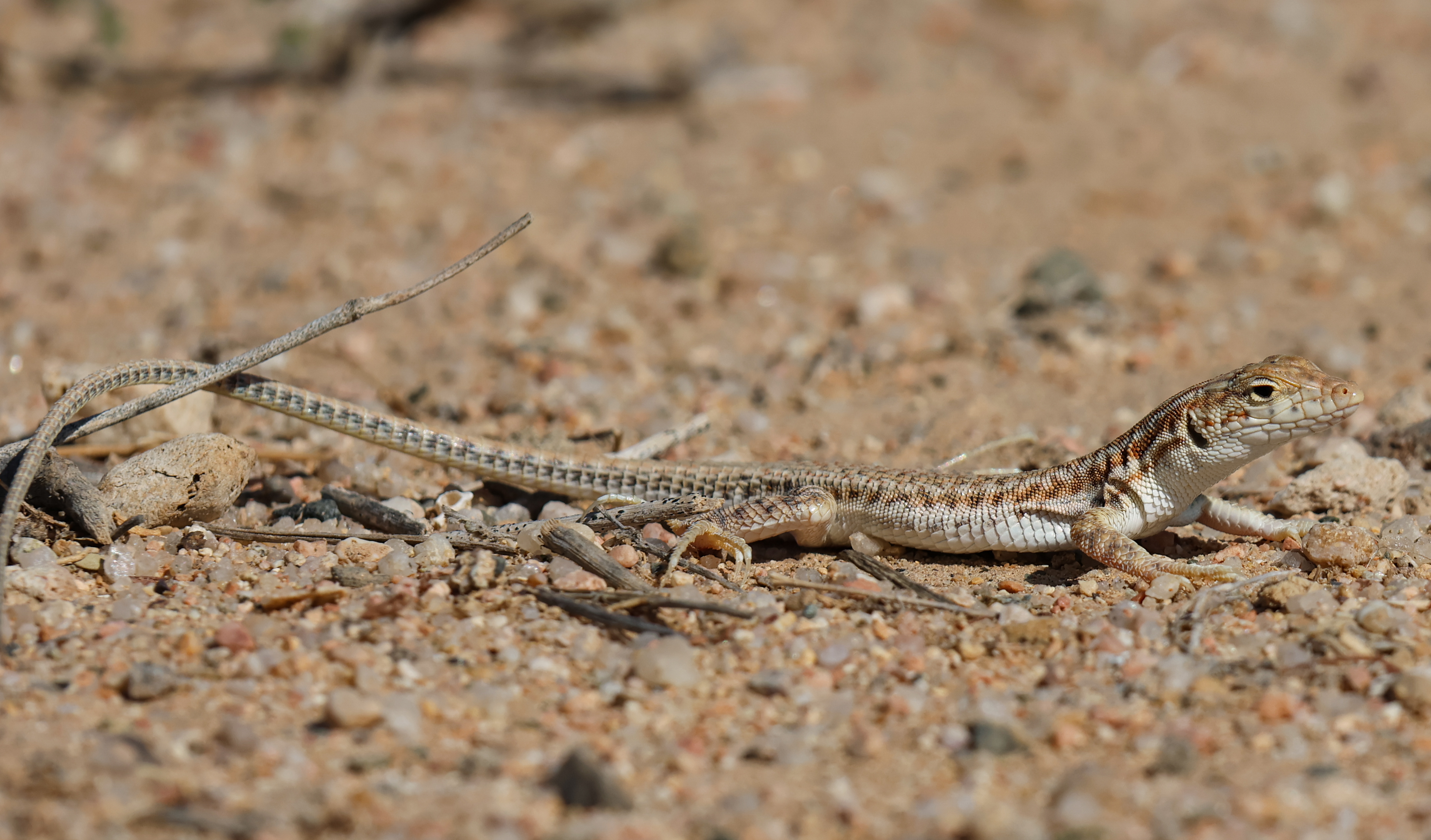
Acanthodactylus opheodurus from Saudi Arabia

A. opheodurus is found in Iraq, Israel, Jordan, Kuwait, Oman, Qatar, Saudi Arabia, United Arab Emirates, and Yemen.

== Reproduction ==
A. opheodurus is oviparous.
