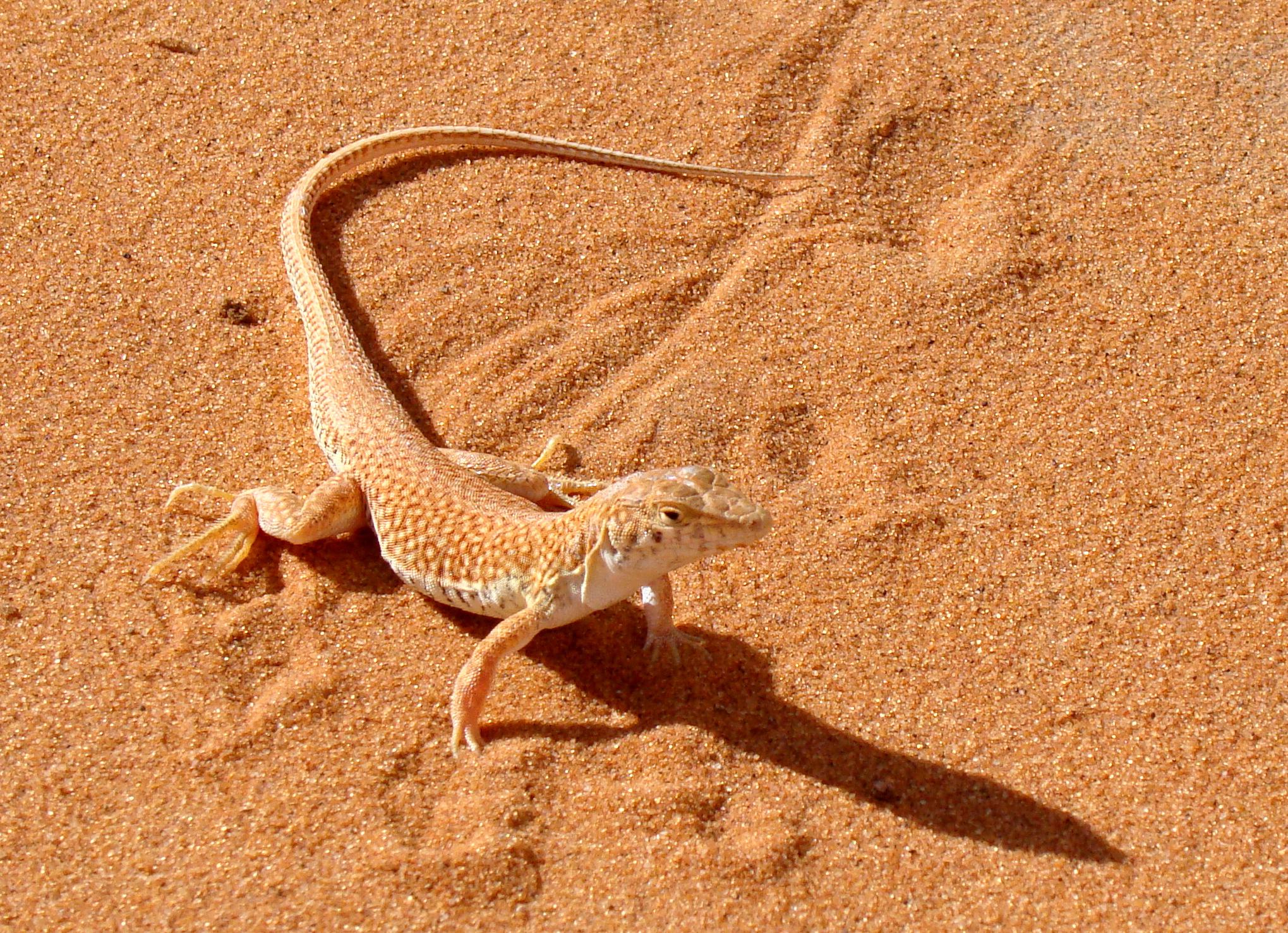

Conservation status
- Least Concern (IUCN 3.1)

Scientific classification
- Kingdom: Animalia
- Phylum: Chordata
- Class: Reptilia
- Order: Squamata
- Family: Lacertidae
- Genus: Acanthodactylus
- Species: A. longipes

Binomial name
- Acanthodactylus longipes Boulenger, 1918

Synonyms
- Acanthodactylus scutellatus Var. longipes Boulenger, 1918; Acanthodactylus longipes — Bons & Girot, 1962; Acanthodactylus longipes panousei Bons & Girot, 1964; Acanthodactylus longipes — Salvador, 1982

= Acanthodactylus longipes =

Species of lizard

Acanthodactylus longipes, commonly called the long fringe-fingered lizard, is a species of lizard in the family Lacertidae. The species is endemic to northwestern Africa.

== Geographic range ==
A. longipes is found in Algeria, Chad, Egypt, Libya, Mali, Mauritania, Morocco, Niger, Tunisia, and Western Sahara.

== Reproduction ==
A. longipes is oviparous.
