= François Doumergue =

French naturalist (1858–1938)

François Doumergue (11 May 1858, Carcassonne – 24 December 1938, Oran, Algeria) was a French naturalist remembered for his scientific investigations within the department of Oran.

From September 1886 onward, he taught classes at the Lycée d'Oran. As a naturalist, he made contributions in the fields of paleontology, geology, botany and zoology. He was a member of the Société de géographie et d'archéologie d'Oran, serving as its president from 1912 to 1920, and then again from 1924 to 1928.

Beginning in 1886, with zoologist Paul Maurice Pallary, he conducted paleontological explorations of several cave sites in the vicinity of Oran. In 1892 at the so-called "Abri Alain" (Kouchet El-Djir), the two men uncovered evidence of prehistoric human activity dating back many centuries. Some of the archaeological pieces that were excavated later became part of the Ahmed Zabana National Museum in Oran.

A herpetological species known as "Doumergue's fringe-fingered lizard" (Acanthodactylus spinicauda) is named after him; it was first described by Doumergue in 1901.

== Selected works ==
- Contributions à la flore de Montolieu (Aude) et de ses environs, 1885 – Contributions to the flora of Montolieu and its neighboring regions.
- La Grotte du ciel ouvert, à Oran, 1893.
- Notes sur quelques plantes intéressantes de la province d'Oran, 1896 – Notes on some interesting plants in the province of Oran.
- Essai sur la faune erpétologique de l'Oranie, 1901 – Essay on the herpetological fauna of Oran.
- Nouvelles contributions au préhistorique de la province d'Oran, 1906 – New contributions on the prehistory of the province of Oran.
- La Grotte préhistorique de la Forêt, à Oran, 1907.
- Notice explicative de la carte géologique d'Oran, avec un historique et des observations de M. Doumergue, 1908 (with E. Ficheur) – Explanatory notes on the geological map of Oran.
