= List of snakes of Jordan =

Snake species found in Jordan (45 species) include:

- Atractaspis engaddensis
- Cerastes cerastes
- Cerastes gasperettii
- Daboia palaestinae
- Dolichophis caspius, Caspian whipsnake
- Dolichophis jugularis
- Dolichophis schmidti
- Echis coloratus
- Eirenis coronella
- Eirenis coronelloides
- Eirenis decemlineatus
- Eirenis lineomaculatus
- Eirenis rothii
- Eryx jaculus
- Hemorrhois nummifer
- Hemorrhois ravergieri
- Letheobia simonii
- Lytorhynchus diadema
- Lytorhynchus kennedyi
- Macrovipera lebetinus
- Malpolon insignitus, Eastern Montpellier snake
- Malpolon moilensis, False cobra
- Malpolon monspessulanus
- Micrelaps muelleri
- Micrelaps tchernovi
- Myriopholis macrorhyncha
- Natrix tessellata, dice snake
- Platyceps collaris, Red whip snake, collared dwarf racer
- Platyceps elegantissimus, Elegant racer
- Platyceps rhodorachis
- Platyceps rogersi
- Platyceps saharicus
- Platyceps sinai
- Platyceps ventromaculatus
- Psammophis schokari
- Pseudocerastes fieldi, Field's horned viper
- Pseudocerastes persicus, Persian horned viper
- Rhynchocalamus melanocephalus, black-headed ground snake
- Spalerosophis diadema
- Telescopus dhara, Arabian cat snake, Israeli cat snake, large-eyed cat snake
- Telescopus fallax, European cat snake
- Telescopus hoogstraali
- Telescopus nigriceps
- Walterinnesia aegyptia
- Xerotyphlops vermicularis
