= Jan's cliff racer =

Jan's cliff racer may refer to:

- Platyceps ladacensis
- Platyceps rhodorachis
