= Braid snake =

Braid snake may refer to:

- Platyceps ladacensis
- Platyceps rhodorachis
