= Lytorhynchus gasperetti =

Conservation status
- Data Deficient (IUCN 3.1)

Scientific classification
- Kingdom: Animalia
- Phylum: Chordata
- Class: Reptilia
- Order: Squamata
- Suborder: Serpentes
- Family: Colubridae
- Genus: Lytorhynchus
- Species: L. gasperetti

Binomial name
- Lytorhynchus gasperetti Leviton, 1977

Species of lizard

Lytorhynchus gasperetti, also known commonly as Leviton's awl-headed snake and Leviton's leafnose snake, is a species of snake in the family Colubridae. The species is endemic to Saudi Arabia.

== Etymology ==
The specific name, gasperetti, is in honor of the collector of the holotype, John Gasperetti, who was an American surveyor, engineer, and herpetologist.

== Geographic range ==
L. gasperetti is found in southwestern Saudi Arabia, at altitudes from sea level to 2,000 m (6,600 ft).

== Description ==
L. gasperetti has its dorsal scales arranged in 19 rows at midbody, decreasing to 15 rows posteriorly (one head length anterior to the cloaca). The average number of ventral scales is 165 for females, and 157 for males.

== Behavior ==
L. gasperetti is terrestrial and nocturnal.

== Diet ==
L. gasperetti preys upon lizards.

== Reproduction ==
L. gasperetti is oviparous.

== Taxonomy ==
L. gasperetti is a member of the L. diadema species group.
