= Platyceps messanai =

Conservation status
- Data Deficient (IUCN 3.1)

Scientific classification
- Kingdom: Animalia
- Phylum: Chordata
- Class: Reptilia
- Order: Squamata
- Suborder: Serpentes
- Family: Colubridae
- Genus: Platyceps
- Species: P. messanai

Binomial name
- Platyceps messanai (Schätti & Lanza, 1989)

Synonyms
- Coluber messanai Schätti & Lanza, 1989

Species of snake

Platyceps messanai, also known commonly as Messana's racer and Schätti's racer, is a species of snake in the subfamily Colubrinae of the family Colubridae. The species is endemic to Somalia.

== Etymology ==
The specific name, messanai, is in honor of Italian biologist Giuseppe Messana.

== Geographic distribution ==
Platyceps messanai is found in northern Somalia.

== Habitat ==
The preferred natural habitat of Platyceps messanai is shrubland, at elevations around 450 m (1,480 ft).

== Behavior ==
Platyceps messanai is terrestrial.

== Reproduction ==
Platyceps messanai is oviparous.
