= Platyceps florulentus =

Conservation status
- Least Concern (IUCN 3.1)

Scientific classification
- Kingdom: Animalia
- Phylum: Chordata
- Class: Reptilia
- Order: Squamata
- Suborder: Serpentes
- Family: Colubridae
- Genus: Platyceps
- Species: P. florulentus

Binomial name
- Platyceps florulentus (Saint-Hilaire, 1827)

Species of snake

Platyceps florulentus, the flowered racer or Geoffroy's racer, is a species of snake of the family Colubridae.

The snake is found in Africa.
