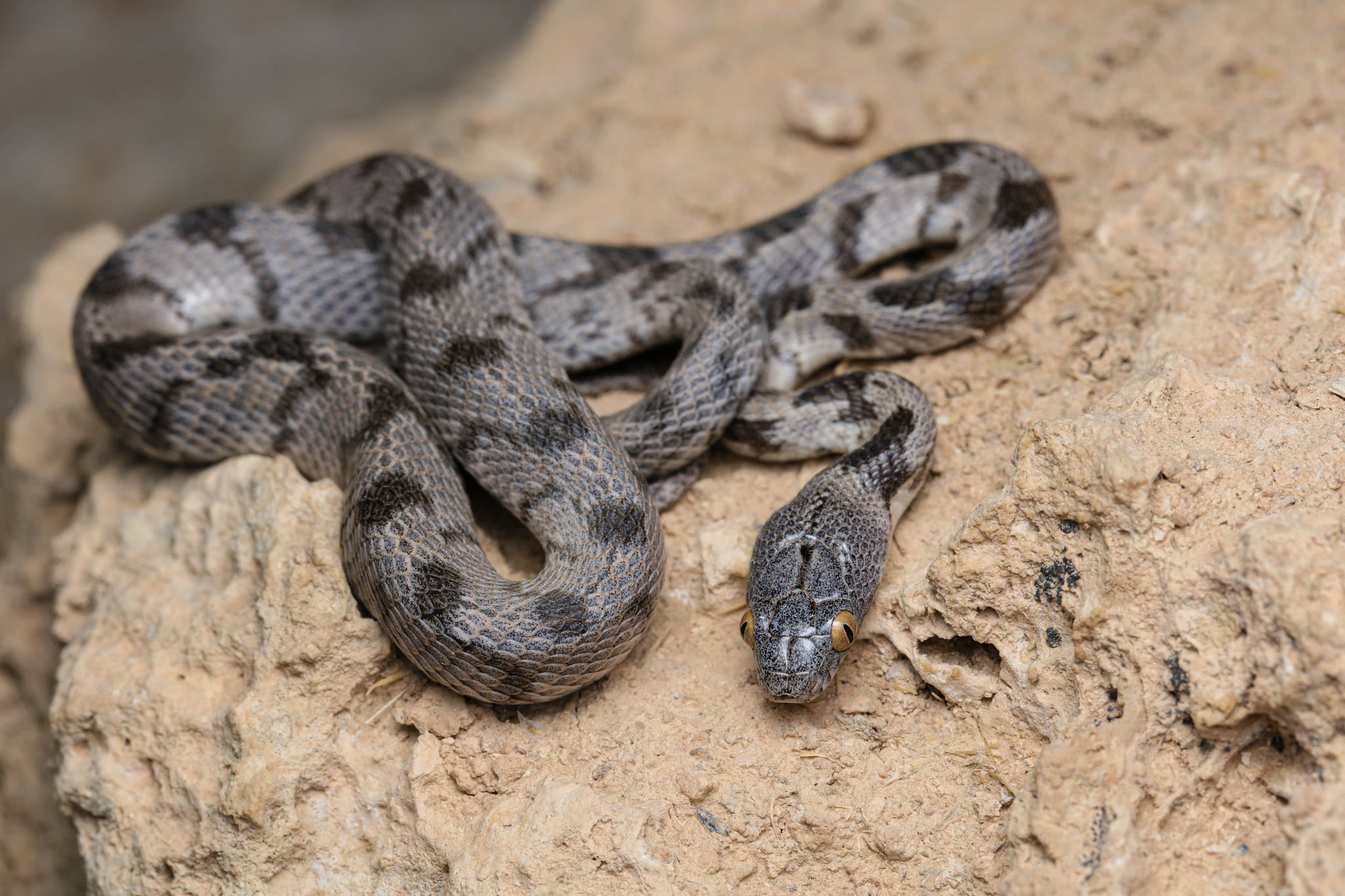
- Juvenile (Iran)

Conservation status
- Least Concern (IUCN 3.1)

Scientific classification
- Kingdom: Animalia
- Phylum: Chordata
- Class: Reptilia
- Order: Squamata
- Suborder: Serpentes
- Family: Colubridae
- Genus: Telescopus
- Species: T. tessellatus

Binomial name
- Telescopus tessellatus (Wall, 1908)

Synonyms
- Tarbophis tessellatus Wall, 1908; Tarbophis martini Schmidt, 1939; Tarbophis fallax iberus Corkill, 1932; Tarbophis iberus Boulenger, 1920

= Telescopus tessellatus =

Species of snake

Telescopus tessellatus, commonly known as the Soosan tiger snake or the Soosan viper, is a snake in the Colubridae family. It is found in western Iran and eastern Iraq. It occurs in rocky places, scrubland, montane areas, and rocky steppe. It is currently listed as of "least concern" on the IUCN Red List of Threatened Species.
