= Lytorhynchus gaddi =

Scientific classification
- Kingdom: Animalia
- Phylum: Chordata
- Class: Reptilia
- Order: Squamata
- Suborder: Serpentes
- Family: Colubridae
- Genus: Lytorhynchus
- Species: L. gaddi

Binomial name
- Lytorhynchus gaddi Nikolsky, 1907

Species of lizard

Lytorhynchus gaddi is a species of snake found in Saudi Arabia, Oman, Yemen, Iraq, and Iran.
