= Egyptian cat snake =

Conservation status
- Least Concern (IUCN 3.1)

Scientific classification
- Kingdom: Animalia
- Phylum: Chordata
- Class: Reptilia
- Order: Squamata
- Suborder: Serpentes
- Family: Colubridae
- Genus: Telescopus
- Species: T. obtusus

Binomial name
- Telescopus obtusus (Reuss, 1834)

Synonyms
- Coluber obtusus Reuss, 1834; Tarbophis obtusus (Reuss, 1834); Telescopus dhara obtusus (Reuss, 1834)

Species of snake

Telescopus obtusus, commonly known as the Egyptian cat snake, is a species of snake in the family Colubridae.

The species is native to northern Africa, where it can be found in Egypt, Ethiopia, Eritrea, Sudan, Somalia, northern Kenya, Tanzania, the Central African Republic, Chad, and Uganda.

The snake is mainly nocturnal and lives in deserts near vegetated areas.
