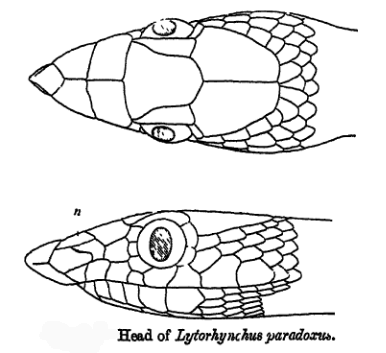
- Lytorhynchus paradoxus

Scientific classification
- Kingdom: Animalia
- Phylum: Chordata
- Class: Reptilia
- Order: Squamata
- Suborder: Serpentes
- Family: Colubridae
- Subfamily: Colubrinae
- Genus: Lytorhynchus; W. Peters, 1862

= Lytorhynchus =

Genus of snakes

Lytorhynchus is a genus of snakes of the family Colubridae.

== Geographic range ==
Species of the genus Lytorhynchus are found from North Africa, eastward through the Middle East, to Pakistan and western India.

== Species ==
Seven species are recognized as being valid.

- Lytorhynchus diadema (A.M.C. Duméril, Bibron & A.H.A. Duméril, 1854) – awl-headed snake, crowned leafnose snake, diademed sand snake
- Lytorhynchus gaddi Nikolsky, 1907
- Lytorhynchus gasperetti Leviton, 1977 – Leviton's leafnose snake
- Lytorhynchus kennedyi Schmidt, 1939 – Kennedy's leafnose snake
- Lytorhynchus maynardi Alcock & Finn, 1897 – Maynard's longnose sand snake
- Lytorhynchus paradoxus (Günther, 1875) – Sindh awl-headed snake
- Lytorhynchus ridgewayi Boulenger, 1887 – Derafshi snake

Nota bene: A binomial authority in parentheses indicates that the species was originally described in a genus other than Lytorhynchus.
