= Telescopus finkeldeyi =

Conservation status
- Least Concern (IUCN 3.1)

Scientific classification
- Kingdom: Animalia
- Phylum: Chordata
- Class: Reptilia
- Order: Squamata
- Suborder: Serpentes
- Family: Colubridae
- Genus: Telescopus
- Species: T. finkeldeyi

Binomial name
- Telescopus finkeldeyi Haacke, 2013

Species of snake

Telescopus finkeldeyi, the Damara tiger snake, is a species of snake of the family Colubridae.

The snake is found in Namibia and Angola.
