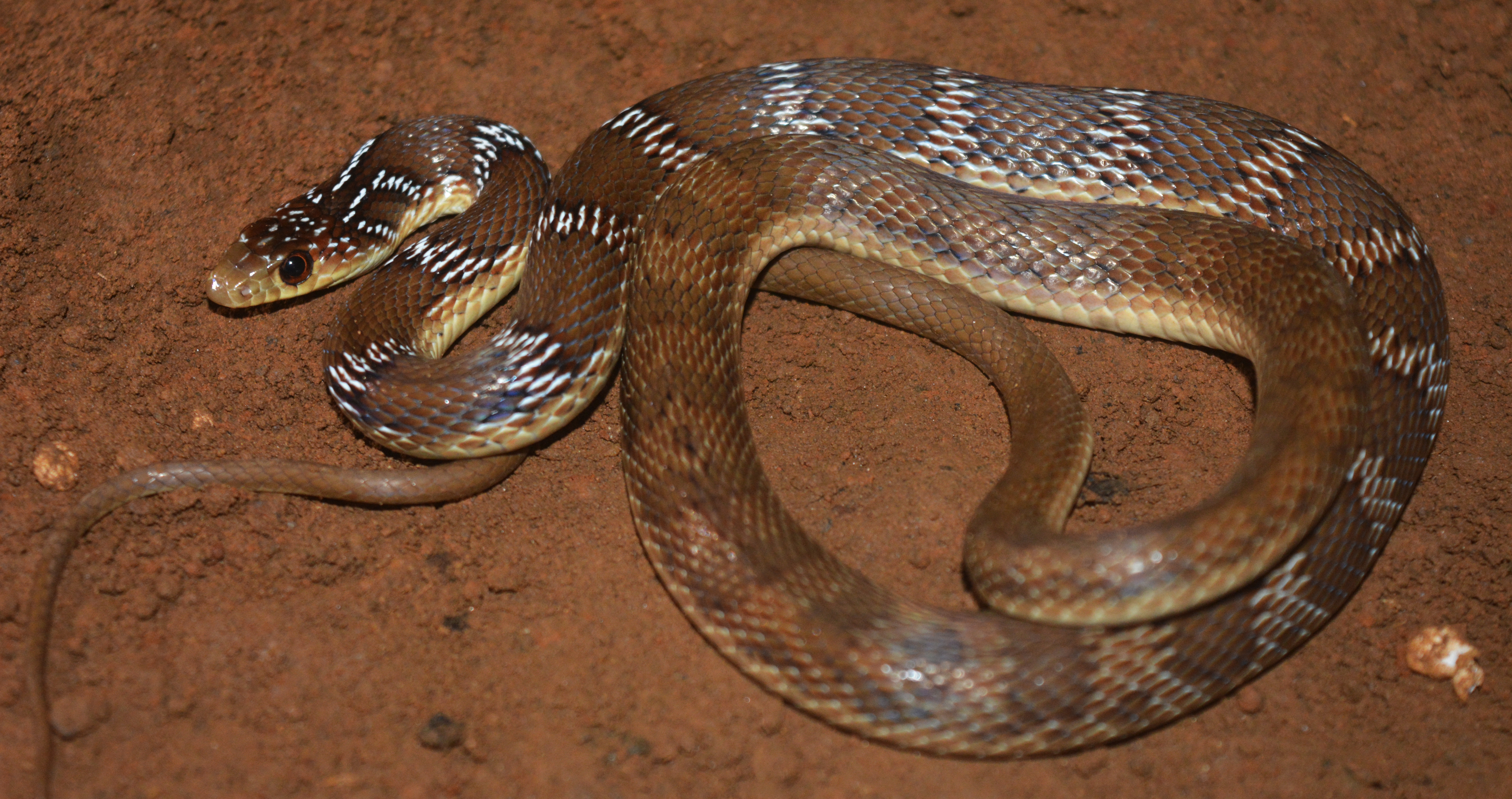
- Joseph’s racer(Platyceps josephi) From Kanyakumari district, Tamilnadu

Scientific classification
- Kingdom: Animalia
- Phylum: Chordata
- Order: Squamata
- Suborder: Serpentes
- Family: Colubridae
- Genus: Platyceps
- Species: P. josephi

Binomial name
- Platyceps josephi Deepak, Narayanan, Mohapatra, Dutta, Melvinselvan, Khan, Mahlow & Tillack, 2021

= Platyceps josephi =

Species of snake

Platyceps josephi, Joseph’s racer, is a species of snake discovered in 2021 in Tamil Nadu, India. The species faces a number of threats including habitat destruction due to grasslands in southern Tamil Nadu being converted into plantations, farmlands, and urban areas.
