= Platyceps atayevi =

Scientific classification
- Kingdom: Animalia
- Phylum: Chordata
- Class: Reptilia
- Order: Squamata
- Suborder: Serpentes
- Family: Colubridae
- Genus: Platyceps
- Species: P. atayevi

Binomial name
- Platyceps atayevi (Tuniyev & Shammakov, 1993)

Species of snake

Platyceps atayevi is a species of snake of the family Colubridae.

The snake is found in Turkmenistan.
