= Variable cat snake =

Conservation status
- Least Concern (IUCN 3.1)

Scientific classification
- Kingdom: Animalia
- Phylum: Chordata
- Class: Reptilia
- Order: Squamata
- Suborder: Serpentes
- Family: Colubridae
- Genus: Telescopus
- Species: T. variegatus

Binomial name
- Telescopus variegatus (Reinhardt, 1843)

Species of snake

The variable cat snake (Telescopus variegatus) is a species of snake of the family Colubridae.

== Geographic range ==
The snake is found in Africa.
