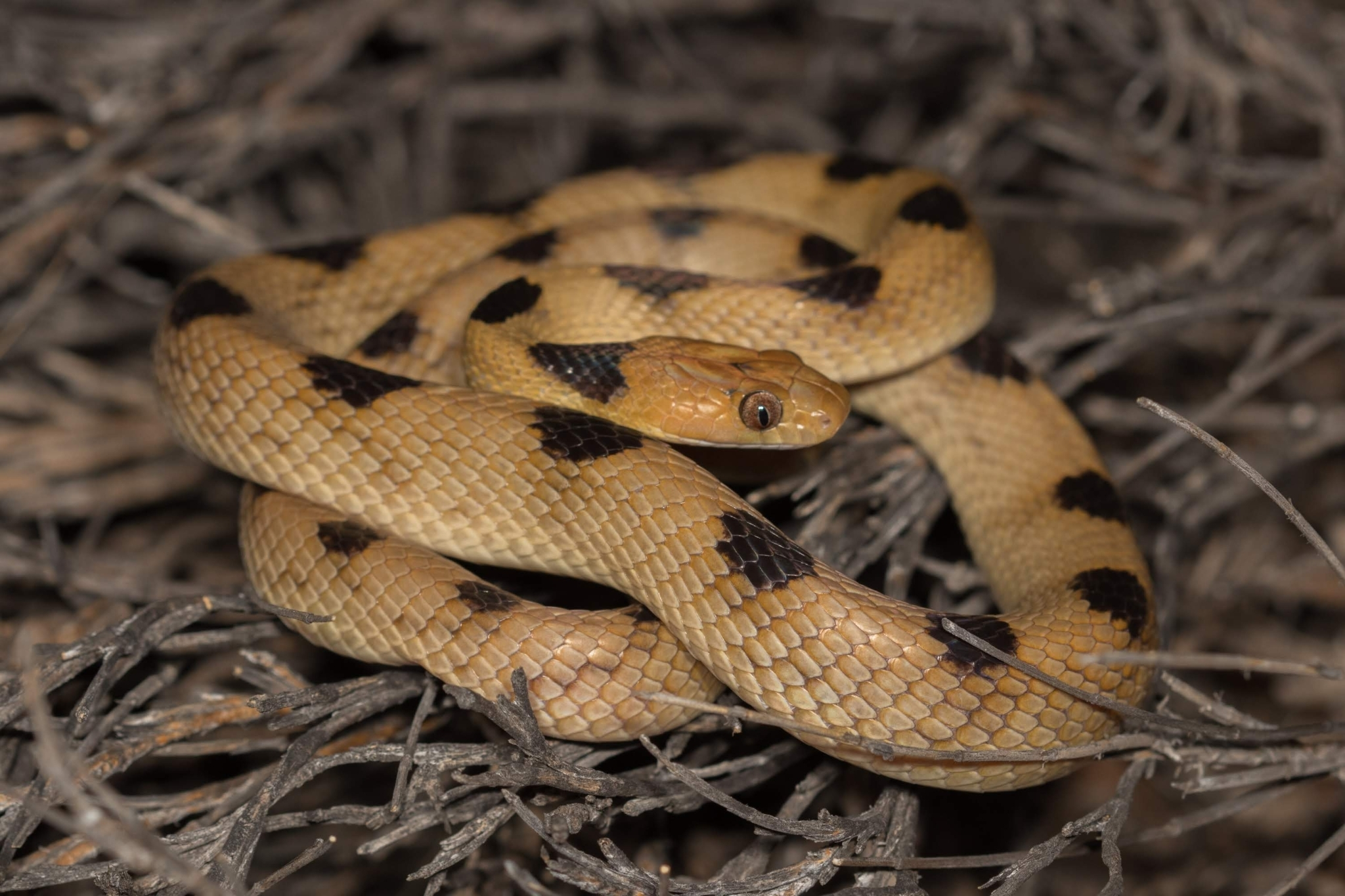

Conservation status
- Least Concern (IUCN 3.1)

Scientific classification
- Kingdom: Animalia
- Phylum: Chordata
- Class: Reptilia
- Order: Squamata
- Suborder: Serpentes
- Family: Colubridae
- Genus: Telescopus
- Species: T. beetzi

Binomial name
- Telescopus beetzi (Barbour, 1922)

Synonyms
- Tarbophis beetzii Barbour, 1922; Telescopus beetzi — Branch, 1987

= Telescopus beetzi =

Species of snake

Telescopus beetzi, commonly known as Beetz's tiger snake, is a species of snake in the family Colubridae. The species is native to southern Africa.

== Etymology ==
The specific name, beetzi, is in honor of German geologist Paul Friedrich Werner Beetz (1887–1954), who collected the holotype.

== Common names ==
Common names for T. beetzi include Beetz's tiger snake, Karoo tiger snake, and Namib tiger snake.

== Geographic range ==
T. beetzi is found in southern Namibia and northwestern South Africa.

== Habitat ==
The preferred natural habitats of T. beetzi are shrubland, desert, and rocky areas, at altitudes of 50–1,500 m (160–4,920 ft).

== Description ==
T. beetzi is a slender, medium-sized snake. Females are larger than males. The maximum recorded snout-to-vent length (SVL) is 59 cm (23 in) for a female, but the maximum recorded SVL is only 43.5 cm (17.1 in) for a male. The dorsal scales are arranged in 21 rows at midbody, and the anal plate is undivided.

== Behavior ==
T. beetzi is nocturnal and partially arboreal.

== Diet ==
T. beetzi preys upon lizards.

== Reproduction ==
T. beetzi is oviparous. Clutch size is 3–5 eggs. The eggs are elongate, with an average size of 12 mm × 44 mm (0.47 in × 1.73 in). The average total length (including tail) of a hatchling is 18 cm (7.1 in).
