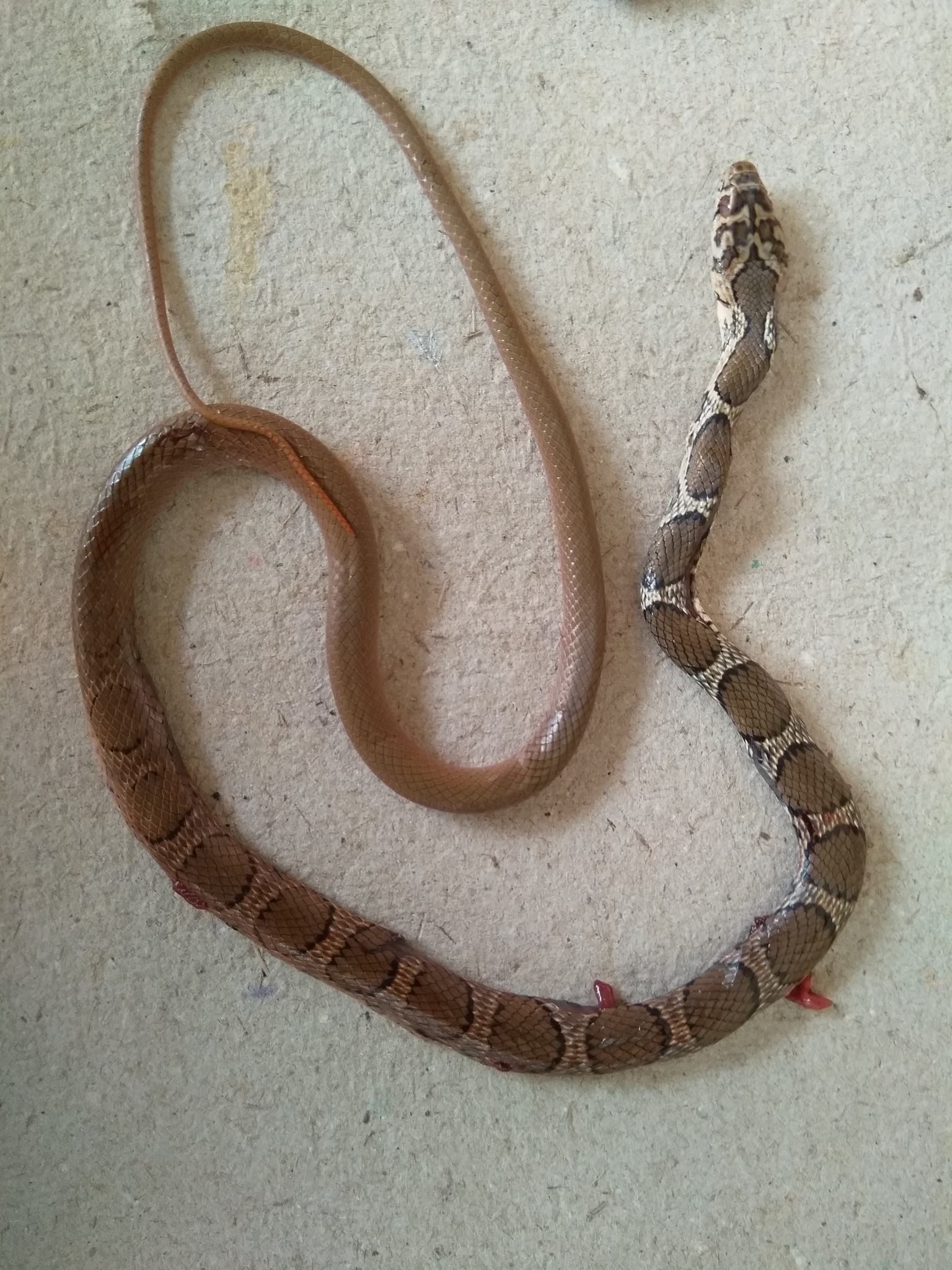
- Road kill of Platyceps bholanathi

Conservation status
- Data Deficient (IUCN 3.1)

Scientific classification
- Kingdom: Animalia
- Phylum: Chordata
- Class: Reptilia
- Order: Squamata
- Suborder: Serpentes
- Family: Colubridae
- Genus: Platyceps
- Species: P. bholanathi

Binomial name
- Platyceps bholanathi (Sharma, 1976)
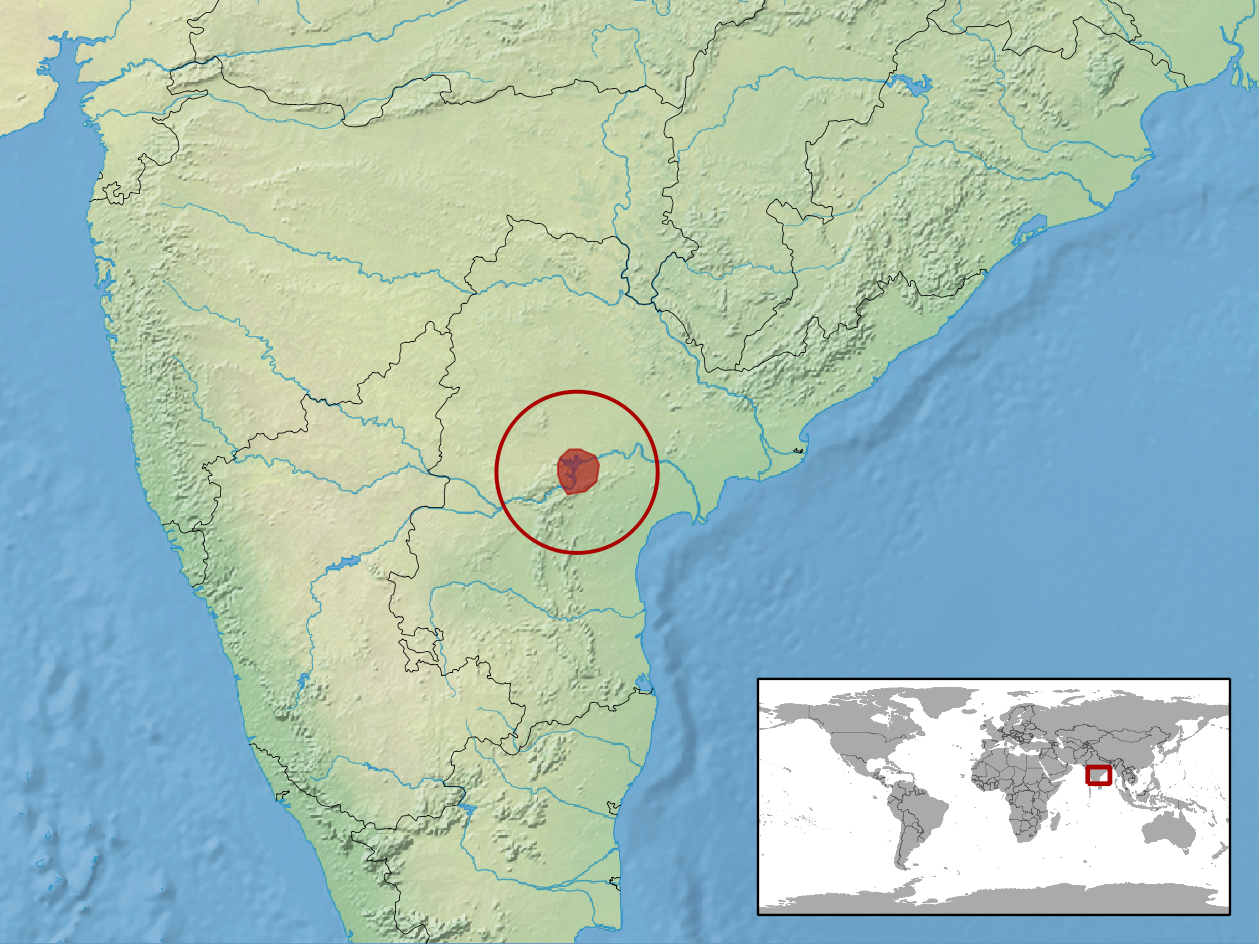
- Platyceps bholanathi was originally described from Nagarjuna Hill in Andhra Pradesh

Synonyms
- Coluber bholanathi Sharma, 1976

= Platyceps bholanathi =

Species of snake

Platyceps bholanathi, also known as the Nagarjun Sagar racer, Nagarjunasagar racer, Nagarjuna racer, Bhola Nath's racer, or Sharma's racer, is a species of colubrid snake. It is found in peninsular India, in the Eastern Ghats and the Deccan Plateau, in the states of Andhra Pradesh, Karnataka, Tamil Nadu, and Telangana. It is a rather recently described species, that was first discovered in 1976, in the Nagarjuna Sagar Dam by scientists of the Zoological Survey of India.

It is a diurnal, fast-moving, active snake, living among rock boulders. It feeds on lizards, small mammals, and birds.

== Description ==
A slender snake; rich brown above with white, black-edged rounded or ovoid spots on the back; underside white.

Scales: Supralabials 9; loreal 1, preocular 1-2, postocular 2, subpostocular 1 or absent, temporal 2+2 or 2+3; 19 mid body rows; ventral 201-212, anal divided; subcaudal 105-121, paired.

== Distribution ==
This species is known from Nagarjuna Sagar Dam in Telangana, Tirupati in Andhra Pradesh, Bellary in Karnataka and Gingee and Hosur in Tamil Nadu, essentially covering all of the rocky hillocks and outcrops in south India.
