= Platyceps schmidtleri =

Scientific classification
- Kingdom: Animalia
- Phylum: Chordata
- Class: Reptilia
- Order: Squamata
- Suborder: Serpentes
- Family: Colubridae
- Genus: Platyceps
- Species: P. schmidtleri

Binomial name
- Platyceps schmidtleri (Schätti & McCarthy, 2001)

Species of snake

Platyceps schmidtleri is a species of snake of the family Colubridae.

The snake is found in Iran.
