= Platyceps largeni =

Conservation status
- Data Deficient (IUCN 3.1)

Scientific classification
- Kingdom: Animalia
- Phylum: Chordata
- Class: Reptilia
- Order: Squamata
- Suborder: Serpentes
- Family: Colubridae
- Genus: Platyceps
- Species: P. largeni

Binomial name
- Platyceps largeni (Schätti, 2001)

Synonyms
- Coluber largeni Schätti, 2001

Species of snake

Platyceps largeni, also known commonly as the Dahlak racer, is a species of snake in the subfamily Colubrinae of the family Colubridae. The species is endemic to Eritrea.

== Etymology ==
The specific name, largeni, is in honor of British herpetologist Malcolm John Largen.

== Geographic range ==
P. largeni is found in the Dahlak Archipelago in Eritrea.

== Habitat ==
The preferred natural habitats of P. largeni are shrubland and the supratidal zone.

== Reproduction ==
P. largeni is oviparous.
