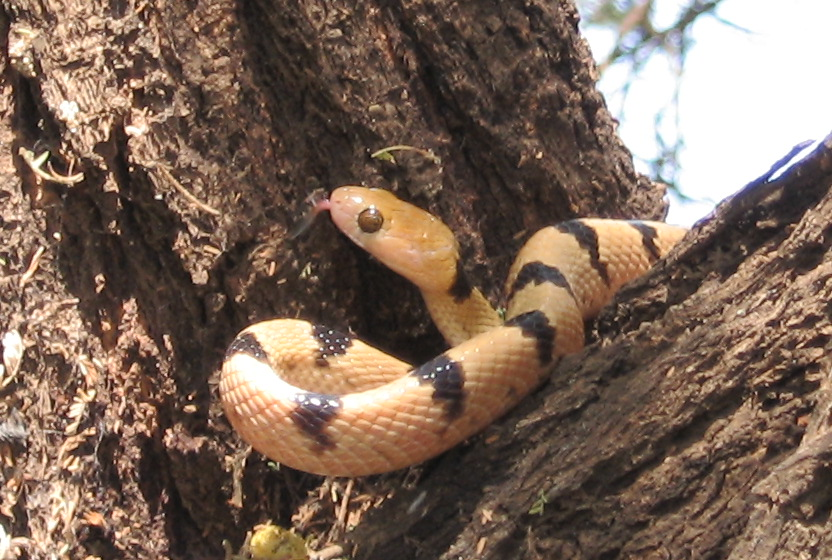
- T. semiannulatus in an acacia, central Tanzania. The vertical pupils are barely visible due to bright sunlight.

Conservation status
- Least Concern (IUCN 3.1)

Scientific classification
- Domain: Eukaryota
- Kingdom: Animalia
- Phylum: Chordata
- Class: Reptilia
- Order: Squamata
- Suborder: Serpentes
- Family: Colubridae
- Genus: Telescopus
- Species: T. semiannulatus

Binomial name
- Telescopus semiannulatus A. Smith, 1849

Synonyms
- Leptodira semiannulata — Günther, 1888; Tarbophis semiannulatus — Fitzsimons & Brain, 1958

= Telescopus semiannulatus =

Species of snake

Telescopus semiannulatus, commonly known as the common tiger snake, tiger cat snake, western tiger snake, or eastern tiger snake is a species of rear-fanged colubrid snake. It is widespread in central, eastern, and southern Africa.

== Geographic range ==
Range by UN subregion:

- Central Africa: Republic of the Congo, Democratic Republic of the Congo, Angola
- Eastern Africa: Kenya, Tanzania, Rwanda, Burundi, Malawi, Zambia, Zimbabwe, Mozambique
- Southern Africa: Namibia, Botswana, Eswatini, South Africa

== Description ==
Adults average 60–90 cm (2.0–3.0 ft) in total length, with 17–21 rows of dorsal scales. The tiger snake is one of the more colorful species of snake in the family Colubridae. The upper side is pale orange to salmon pink in color with 24–48 black or dark-brown cross bars or blotches along the back and tail; the underside is pale yellow to orangish pink along the throat, paler along the rest of the body. It has a distinct head and large orange eyes with vertical pupils, and a narrow body with long tail.

== Subspecies ==
There are two subspecies:

- Telescopus semiannulatus polystictus Mertens, 1954
- Telescopus semiannulatus semiannulatus Smith, 1849

The subspecies T. s. polystictus, Damara tiger snake, is found in the highveld of Namibia and northwest South Africa, has a more mottled appearance and more black bands (up to 75), and may be a separate species.

== Habitat and behaviour ==
Telescopus semiannulatus is found in both dry and humid subtropical and tropical habitats, from rocky desert, scrub and savanna, to lowland forest. Largely terrestrial but sometimes arboreal, it shelters under bark and rock or in thatched roofs. It is a nocturnal snake.

== Venom ==
Telescopus semiannulatus is rear-fanged and mildly venomous, but not dangerous to humans. Localized swelling might occur. Because Telescopus semiannulatus feeds mostly on lizards, the venom is more effective on other reptiles.

The fangs are grooved rather than hollow. When Telescopus semiannulatus grabs onto its prey, it holds on and chews venom into the wound, adding constriction to immobilize prey.

== Diet ==
Its diet is largely lizards, especially geckos, but also small rodents and fledgling birds and bats.

== Captivity ==
Initially T. semiannulatus strikes readily, but the venom is not dangerous to humans, and it tames quickly. In captivity it accepts geckos while larger individuals will take half-grown mice. Even smaller animals are eating fresh born mice. In captivity it gets really calm and is interested in the things that happen around.

== Breeding ==
The tiger snake is oviparous. Females lay half a dozen to several dozen eggs in damp leaf litter.
