= Telescopus rhinopoma =

Conservation status
- Data Deficient (IUCN 3.1)

Scientific classification
- Kingdom: Animalia
- Phylum: Chordata
- Class: Reptilia
- Order: Squamata
- Suborder: Serpentes
- Family: Colubridae
- Genus: Telescopus
- Species: T. rhinopoma

Binomial name
- Telescopus rhinopoma (Blanford, 1874)

Synonyms
- Dipsas rhinopoma Blanford, 1874; Tarbophis rhinopoma — Boulenger, 1895; Telescopus rhinopoma — Minton, 1962

Species of snake

Telescopus rhinopoma is a species of rear-fanged mildly venomous snake (not harmful for humans) in the family Colubridae. The species is found in the Middle East (Iran), Afghanistan, Pakistan, and Central Asia (Turkmenistan).

== Common names ==
The Common name for T. rhinopoma is Desert cat snake.

== Geographic range ==
Telescopus rhinopoma is found in southern Iran, southern Turkmenistan, southwestern Afghanistan, and western and northwestern Pakistan.

== Description ==
It's known as Desert Cat Snake because it is found in the desert area and its eyes are like cat's eyes. This snake is found in desert areas of Middle East (Iran), Afghanistan, Pakistan and Turkmenistan. It is a mild venomous snake which cannot cause death to human beings. It is gray in color with dark brown spots. Its stomach is dark brown. Its diet includes desert lizards and rats. Telescopus rhinopoma may attain a total length (including tail) of about one meter (39 inches).

== Reproduction ==
Telescopus rhinopoma is oviparous.
