= Platyceps somalicus =

Conservation status
- Data Deficient (IUCN 3.1)

Scientific classification
- Kingdom: Animalia
- Phylum: Chordata
- Class: Reptilia
- Order: Squamata
- Suborder: Serpentes
- Family: Colubridae
- Genus: Platyceps
- Species: P. somalicus

Binomial name
- Platyceps somalicus Boulenger, 1896

Synonyms
- Zamenis somalicus Boulenger, 1896; Coluber somalicus Boulenger, 1896

Species of snake

Platyceps somalicus is a species of snake of the family Colubridae. It is found in Somalia and Ethiopia. It also known as the Ogaden racer, or Audo racer.
