= Platyceps taylori =

Conservation status
- Least Concern (IUCN 3.1)

Scientific classification
- Kingdom: Animalia
- Phylum: Chordata
- Class: Reptilia
- Order: Squamata
- Suborder: Serpentes
- Family: Colubridae
- Genus: Platyceps
- Species: P. taylori

Binomial name
- Platyceps taylori (Parker, 1949)

Species of snake

Platyceps taylori, Taylor's racer, is a species of snake of the family Colubridae.

The snake is found in Somalia, Ethiopia, Eritrea, and Djibouti.
