= Lytorhynchus kennedyi =

Scientific classification
- Kingdom: Animalia
- Phylum: Chordata
- Class: Reptilia
- Order: Squamata
- Suborder: Serpentes
- Family: Colubridae
- Genus: Lytorhynchus
- Species: L. kennedyi

Binomial name
- Lytorhynchus kennedyi Schmidt, 1939

Species of snake

Lytorhynchus kennedyi, also known commonly as Kennedy's leafnose snake, is a species of non-venomous snake in the subfamily Colubrinae of the family Colubridae. The species is native to the Middle East.

== Etymology ==
The specific name, kennedyi, is in honor of British physician Walter P. Kennedy.

== Description ==
Adults of L. kennedyi measure 30–51 cm (12–20 in) in total length (including tail). The dorsum is bright orange to reddish, with dark transverse crossbars on the body and the tail.

== Geographic range ==
L. kennedyi is found in Syria and Jordan, and possibly in southwestern Iraq. The type locality is "from between Homs and Palmyra, Syria".

== Habitat and Behavior ==
The preferred natural habitats of L. kennedyi are sandy desert, semi-desert, sandy coastal areas, areas of high grassland plateaus (especially those close to rocky areas), and clay plateaus with rocks. This species digs, but is not considered fossorial. In Arabia it appears to occur in a wide range of dry habitats.

== Diet ==
L. kennedyi preys predominately upon on lizards, but will also eat insects, large arthropods, and young rodents.

== Reproduction ==
L. kennedyi is oviparous. The female lays clutches of three to five eggs.

== Taxonomy ==
L. kennedyi has sometimes been considered to be a subspecies of L. diadema as L. d. kennedyi.
