= Platyceps scortecci =

Conservation status
- Data Deficient (IUCN 3.1)

Scientific classification
- Kingdom: Animalia
- Phylum: Chordata
- Class: Reptilia
- Order: Squamata
- Suborder: Serpentes
- Family: Colubridae
- Genus: Platyceps
- Species: P. scortecci

Binomial name
- Platyceps scortecci (Lanza, 1963)

Species of snake

Platyceps scortecci is a species of snake of the family Colubridae.

The snake is found in Somalia.
