= Platyceps variabilis =

Conservation status
- Least Concern (IUCN 3.1)

Scientific classification
- Kingdom: Animalia
- Phylum: Chordata
- Class: Reptilia
- Order: Squamata
- Suborder: Serpentes
- Family: Colubridae
- Genus: Platyceps
- Species: P. variabilis

Binomial name
- Platyceps variabilis (Boulenger, 1905)

Species of snake

Platyceps variabilis is a species of snake of the family Colubridae. It is found in Saudi Arabia and Yemen. It also known as the variable snake or variable racer.
