= Lytorhynchus maynardi =

Conservation status
- Least Concern (IUCN 3.1)

Scientific classification
- Kingdom: Animalia
- Phylum: Chordata
- Class: Reptilia
- Order: Squamata
- Suborder: Serpentes
- Family: Colubridae
- Genus: Lytorhynchus
- Species: L. maynardi

Binomial name
- Lytorhynchus maynardi Alcock & Finn, 1897

Species of lizard

Lytorhynchus maynardi, also known commonly as Maynard's longnose sand snake and the Baloch awl-headed sand snake, is a species of snake in the subfamily Colubrinae of the family Colubridae. The species is native to Asia.

== Etymology ==
The specific name, maynardi, is in honor of Colonel F.P. Maynard (died 1921), a physician with the Indian Medical Service.

== Description ==
Dorsally, Lytorhynchus maynardi is salmon-colored with a series of many narrow dark brown crossbars. Ventrally, it is cream-colored.

== Geographic distribution ==
Lytorhynchus maynardi is found Afghanistan, Iran, and Pakistan.

== Behavior and habitat ==
The preferred natural habitats of Lytorhynchus maynardi are desert and shrubland. The species is fossorial and in Iran occurs in sand dune habitats at altitudes around 500 m (1,600 ft). The species' type locality is in southern Afghanistan at an elevation of 1,310 m (4,300 ft). It is nocturnal (active at night).

== Diet ==
Lytorhynchus maynardi preys upon arthropods and small lizards.

== Reproduction ==
Lytorhynchus maynardi is oviparous. Clutch size is 2–4 eggs.
