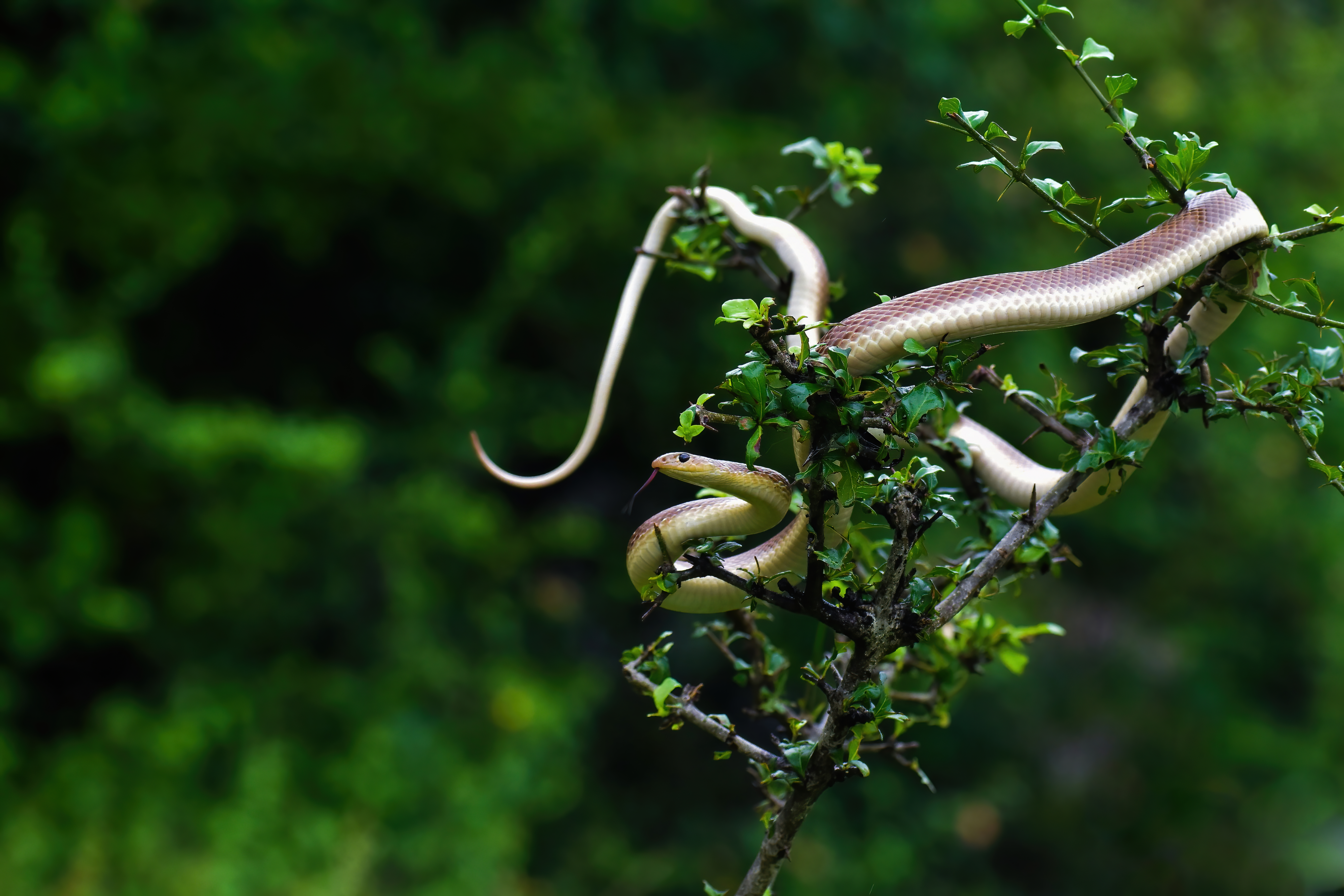

Scientific classification
- Kingdom: Animalia
- Phylum: Chordata
- Class: Reptilia
- Order: Squamata
- Suborder: Serpentes
- Family: Colubridae
- Genus: Platyceps
- Species: P. plinii

Binomial name
- Platyceps plinii (Merrem, 1820)

= Platyceps plinii =

Species of snake

Platyceps plinii, commonly known as Banded racer or Merrem’s racer, is a species of snake of the family Colubridae.

The snake is found in Asia.

Descriptionː Body is reddish to grayish brown. Lower sides of scales dark. Adults uniColour, indistinct light grayish crossbars on anterior part of body in juveniles, ventrum cream.
