= Platyceps noeli =

Conservation status
- Data Deficient (IUCN 3.1)

Scientific classification
- Kingdom: Animalia
- Phylum: Chordata
- Class: Reptilia
- Order: Squamata
- Suborder: Serpentes
- Family: Colubridae
- Genus: Platyceps
- Species: P. noeli

Binomial name
- Platyceps noeli Schätti, Tillack & Kucharzewski, 2014

Species of snake

Platyceps noeli, the Brahui racer, is a species of snake of the family Colubridae.

The snake is found in Pakistan.
