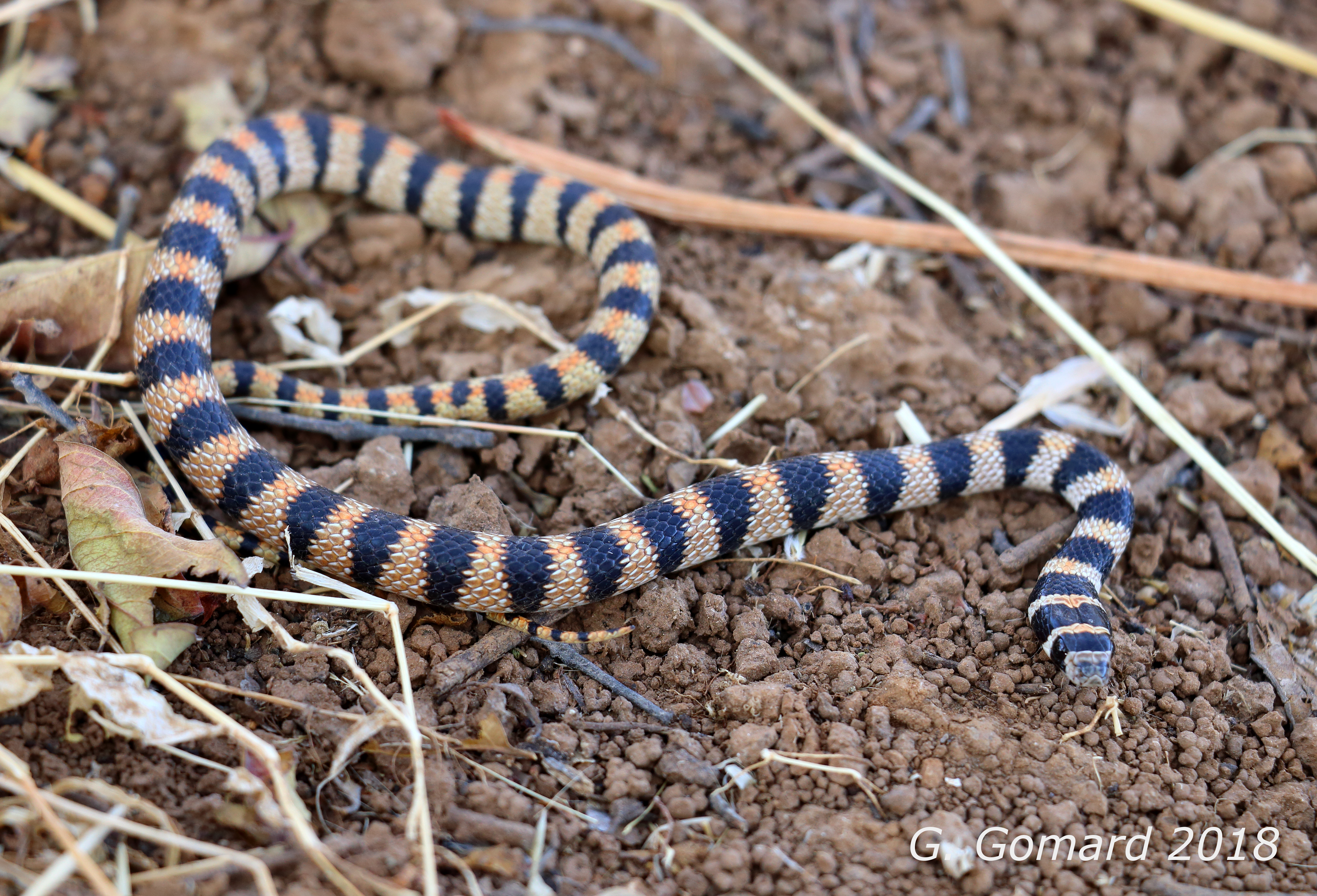

Conservation status
- Data Deficient (IUCN 3.1)

Scientific classification
- Kingdom: Animalia
- Phylum: Chordata
- Class: Reptilia
- Order: Squamata
- Suborder: Serpentes
- Family: Colubridae
- Genus: Platyceps
- Species: P. thomasi

Binomial name
- Platyceps thomasi (Parker, 1931)

= Platyceps thomasi =

Species of snake

Platyceps thomasi, Thomas's semi-banded racer, is a species of snake of the family Colubridae.

The snake is found in Oman and Yemen.
