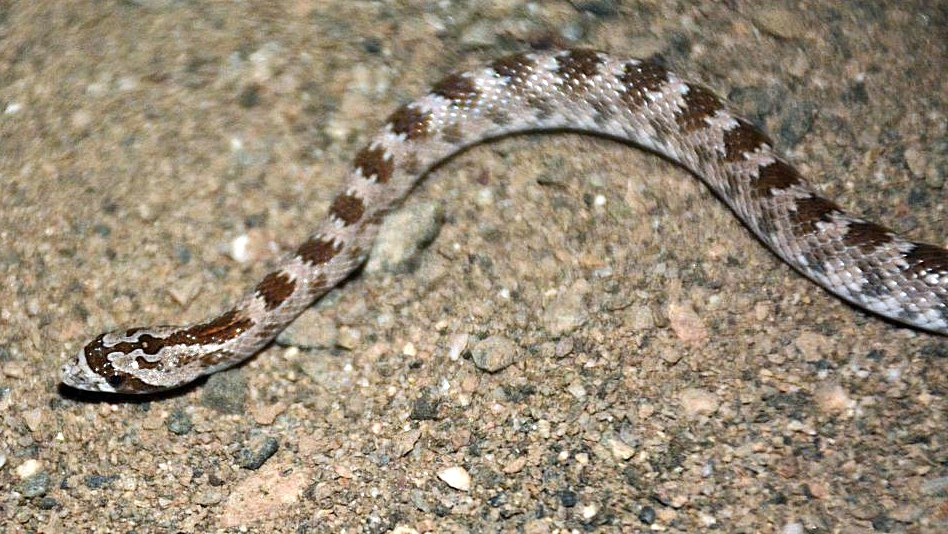
- Lytorhynchus ridgewayi

Conservation status
- Least Concern (IUCN 3.1)

Scientific classification
- Kingdom: Animalia
- Phylum: Chordata
- Class: Reptilia
- Order: Squamata
- Suborder: Serpentes
- Family: Colubridae
- Genus: Lytorhynchus
- Species: L. ridgewayi

Binomial name
- Lytorhynchus ridgewayi Boulenger, 1887

= Lytorhynchus ridgewayi =

Species of lizard

Lytorhynchus ridgewayi, the Derafshi snake, is a species of snake found in Turkmenistan, Uzbekistan, Iran, Afghanistan, and Pakistan .
