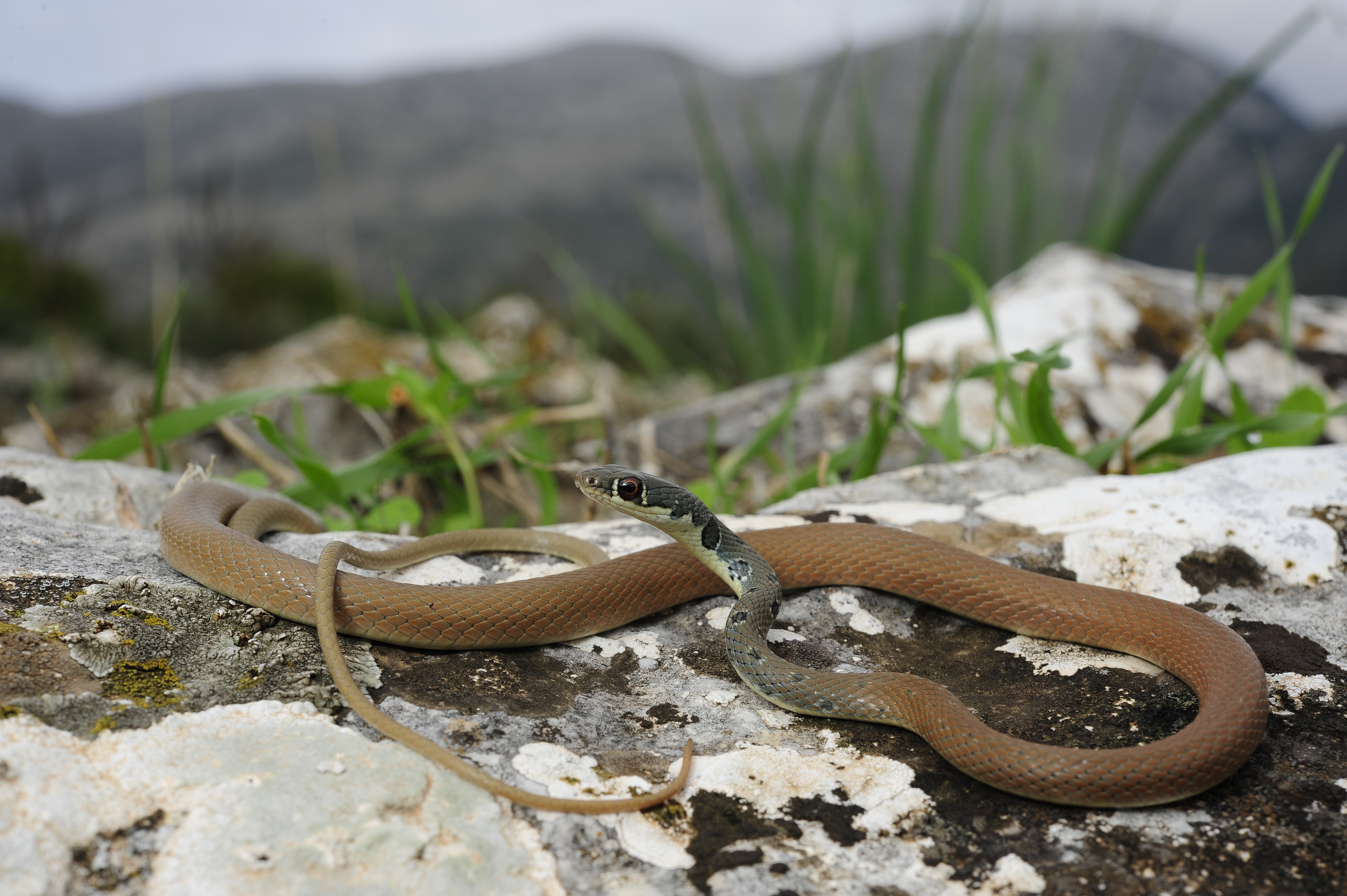
- Platyceps najadum

Scientific classification
- Kingdom: Animalia
- Phylum: Chordata
- Class: Reptilia
- Order: Squamata
- Suborder: Serpentes
- Family: Colubridae
- Subfamily: Colubrinae
- Genus: Platyceps; Blyth, 1860

= Platyceps =

Genus of snakes

Platyceps is a genus of snakes of the family Colubridae endemic to Eurasia.

== Taxonomy ==
The genus was erected in 1860 by Edward Blyth, allying species previously described.

The genus name Platyceps was inadvertently used for a fossil species in 1877, now recognised as Platycepsion wilkinsoni.

== Species ==
The following 30 species are recognized as being valid.

- Platyceps afarensis Schätti & Ineich, 2004 - Afar racer
- Platyceps atayevi (Tuniyev & Shammakov, 1993)
- Platyceps bholanathi (Sharma, 1976) - Sharma's racer, Nagarjunasagar racer
- Platyceps brevis (Boulenger, 1895) - short racer
- Platyceps collaris (F. Müller, 1878) - red whip snake, collared dwarf racer
- Platyceps elegantissimus (Günther, 1878) - elegant racer
- Platyceps florulentus (I. Geoffroy Saint-Hilaire, 1827) - flowered racer, Geoffroy's racer
- Platyceps gracilis (Günther, 1862) - graceful racer, slender racer
- Platyceps insulanus (Mertens, 1965) - Sarso Island racer
- Platyceps josephi Deepak, Narayanan, Mohapatra, Dutta, Melvinselvan, Khan, Mahlow & Tillack, 2021 -Joseph’s racer
- Platyceps karelini (Brandt, 1838) - spotted desert racer
- Platyceps ladacensis (Anderson, 1871) - braid snake, Jan's cliff racer
- Platyceps largeni (Schätti, 2001) - Dahlak racer
- Platyceps messanai (Schätti & Lanza, 1989) - Schätti's racer
- Platyceps najadum (Eichwald, 1831) - Dahl's whip snake, the slender whip snake
- Platyceps noeli Schätti, Tillack & Kucharzewski, 2014 - Brahui racer
- Platyceps plinii (Merrem, 1820)
- Platyceps rhodorachis (Jan, 1865) - common cliff racer, Wadi racer, desert racer, braid snake, Jan’s cliff racer
- Platyceps rogersi (Anderson, 1893) - Rogers's racer
- Platyceps saharicus Schätti & McCarthy, 2004
- Platyceps schmidtleri (Schätti & McCarthy, 2001)
- Platyceps scortecci (Lanza, 1963)
- Platyceps sinai (Schmidt & Marx, 1956) - Sinai racer, Sinai banded racer
- Platyceps sindhensis Schätti, Tillack & Kucharzewski, 2014 - Sindh racer
- Platyceps somalicus (Boulenger, 1896) - Ogaden racer, Audo racer
- Platyceps taylori (Parker, 1949) - Taylor's racer
- Platyceps thomasi (Parker, 1931) - Thomas's semi-banded racer
- Platyceps variabilis (Boulenger, 1905) - variable snake, variable racer
- Platyceps ventromaculatus (Gray, 1834) - Hardwicke's rat snake, glossy-bellied racer, Gray's rat snake, spotted bellied snake
- Platyceps vittacaudatus (Blyth, 1854) - striped-tailed racer

Nota bene: A binomial authority in parentheses indicates that the species was originally described in a genus other than Platyceps.
