= Platyceps afarensis =

Conservation status
- Data Deficient (IUCN 3.1)

Scientific classification
- Kingdom: Animalia
- Phylum: Chordata
- Class: Reptilia
- Order: Squamata
- Suborder: Serpentes
- Family: Colubridae
- Genus: Platyceps
- Species: P. afarensis

Binomial name
- Platyceps afarensis Schätti & Ineich, 2004

Species of snake

Platyceps afarensis, the Afar racer, is a species of snake of the family Colubridae.

The snake is found in Djibouti.
