= Telescopus tripolitanus =

Conservation status
- Least Concern (IUCN 3.1)

Scientific classification
- Kingdom: Animalia
- Phylum: Chordata
- Class: Reptilia
- Order: Squamata
- Suborder: Serpentes
- Family: Colubridae
- Genus: Telescopus
- Species: T. tripolitanus

Binomial name
- Telescopus tripolitanus (F. Werner, 1908)

Species of snake

Telescopus tripolitanus is a species of snake of the family Colubridae.

The snake is found in Central Africa.
