= Telescopus gezirae =

Conservation status
- Data Deficient (IUCN 3.1)

Scientific classification
- Kingdom: Animalia
- Phylum: Chordata
- Class: Reptilia
- Order: Squamata
- Suborder: Serpentes
- Family: Colubridae
- Genus: Telescopus
- Species: T. gezirae

Binomial name
- Telescopus gezirae Broadley, 1994

Species of snake

Telescopus gezirae, the Blue Nile cat snake, is a species of snake of the family Colubridae.

The snake is found in Sudan.
