= Telescopus pulcher =

Conservation status
- Data Deficient (IUCN 3.1)

Scientific classification
- Kingdom: Animalia
- Phylum: Chordata
- Class: Reptilia
- Order: Squamata
- Suborder: Serpentes
- Family: Colubridae
- Genus: Telescopus
- Species: T. pulcher

Binomial name
- Telescopus pulcher (Scortecci, 1935)

Species of snake

Telescopus pulcher, the beautiful cat snake, is a species of snake of the family Colubridae.

The snake is found in Somalia and Ethiopia.
