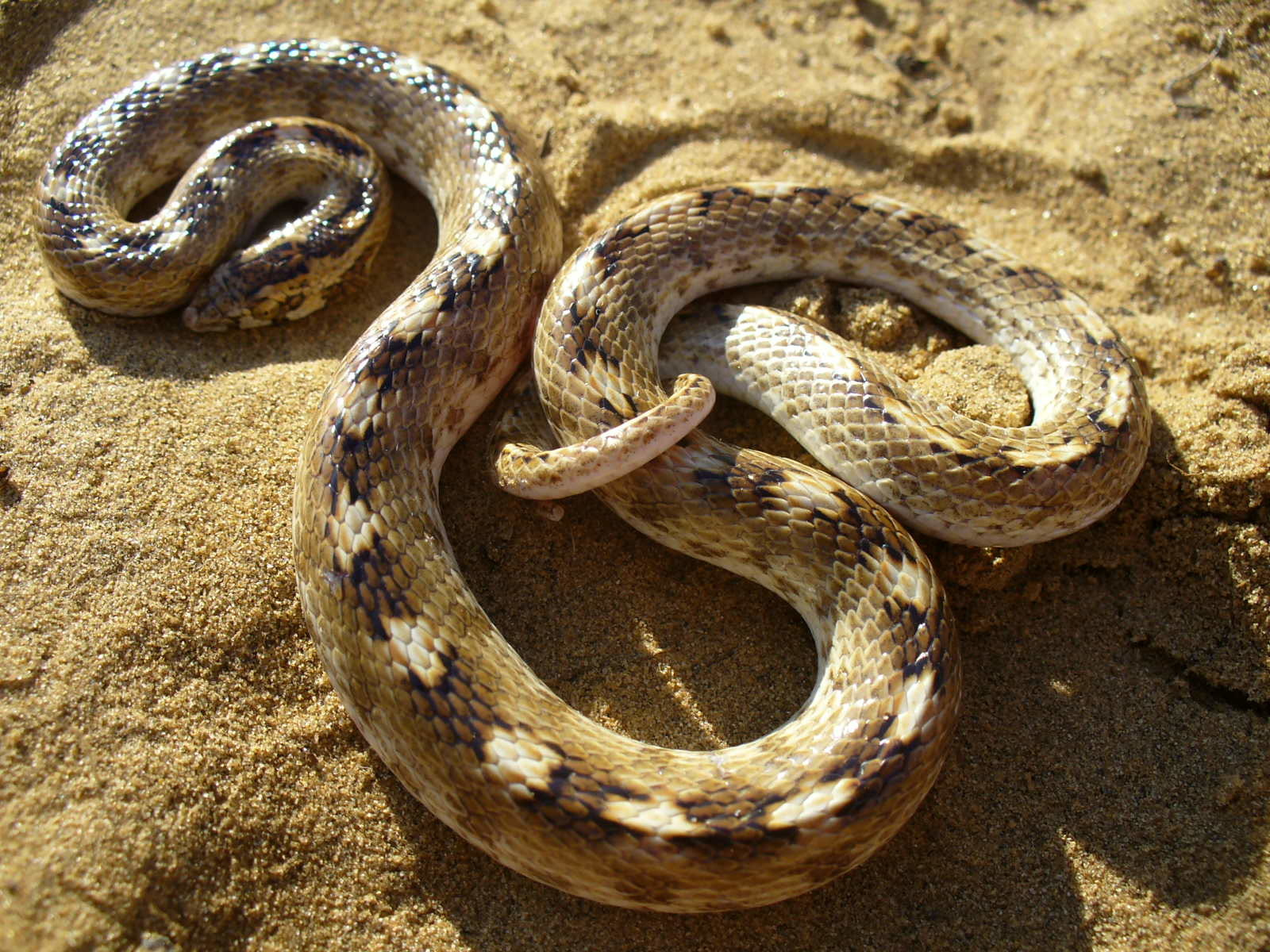

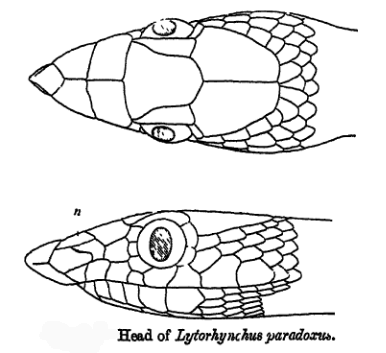
- Head Illustration

Conservation status
- Least Concern (IUCN 3.1)

Scientific classification
- Kingdom: Animalia
- Phylum: Chordata
- Class: Reptilia
- Order: Squamata
- Suborder: Serpentes
- Family: Colubridae
- Genus: Lytorhynchus
- Species: L. paradoxus

Binomial name
- Lytorhynchus paradoxus (Günther, 1875)

Synonyms
- Acontiophis paradoxa Günther, 1875; Lytorhynchus paradoxus — Boulenger, 1890

= Lytorhynchus paradoxus =

Species of snake

Lytorhynchus paradoxus, commonly known as the Sindh awl-headed snake and the Sind longnose sand snake, is a species of snake in the family Colubridae. The species is native to the desert areas of Pakistan and India (Rajasthan).

== Description ==
The snout of L. paradoxus is long and acutely pointed. The rostral has a lateral cleft. The suture between the internasals is shorter than that between the prefrontals and shorter than the upper part of the rostral. The frontal is nearly as long as its distance from the end of the snout, as long as the parietals. The supraocular is narrow. There are three preoculars and two postoculars. The temporals are arranged 2+2 or 2+3. There are 8 upper labials, the fifth entering the eye. There are 4 lower labials in contact with the anterior chin shields. The anterior chin shields are shorter but much broader than the posterior chin shields.

The dorsal scales are in 19 rows at midbody. The ventrals are slightly angulate laterally, and number 169-175. The anal is divided. The subcaudals number 40-53.

The body is cream-coloured above, with a dorsal series of transverse brown spots and a less distinct lateral series of smaller spots on each side. There is a large rhomboidal brown spot on the back of the head, and a brown band behind the eye. The lower parts are white .

The total length is 14 inches (360 mm), including the tail which is 2.3 inches (58 mm) long.

== Reproduction ==
L. paradoxus is oviparous.
