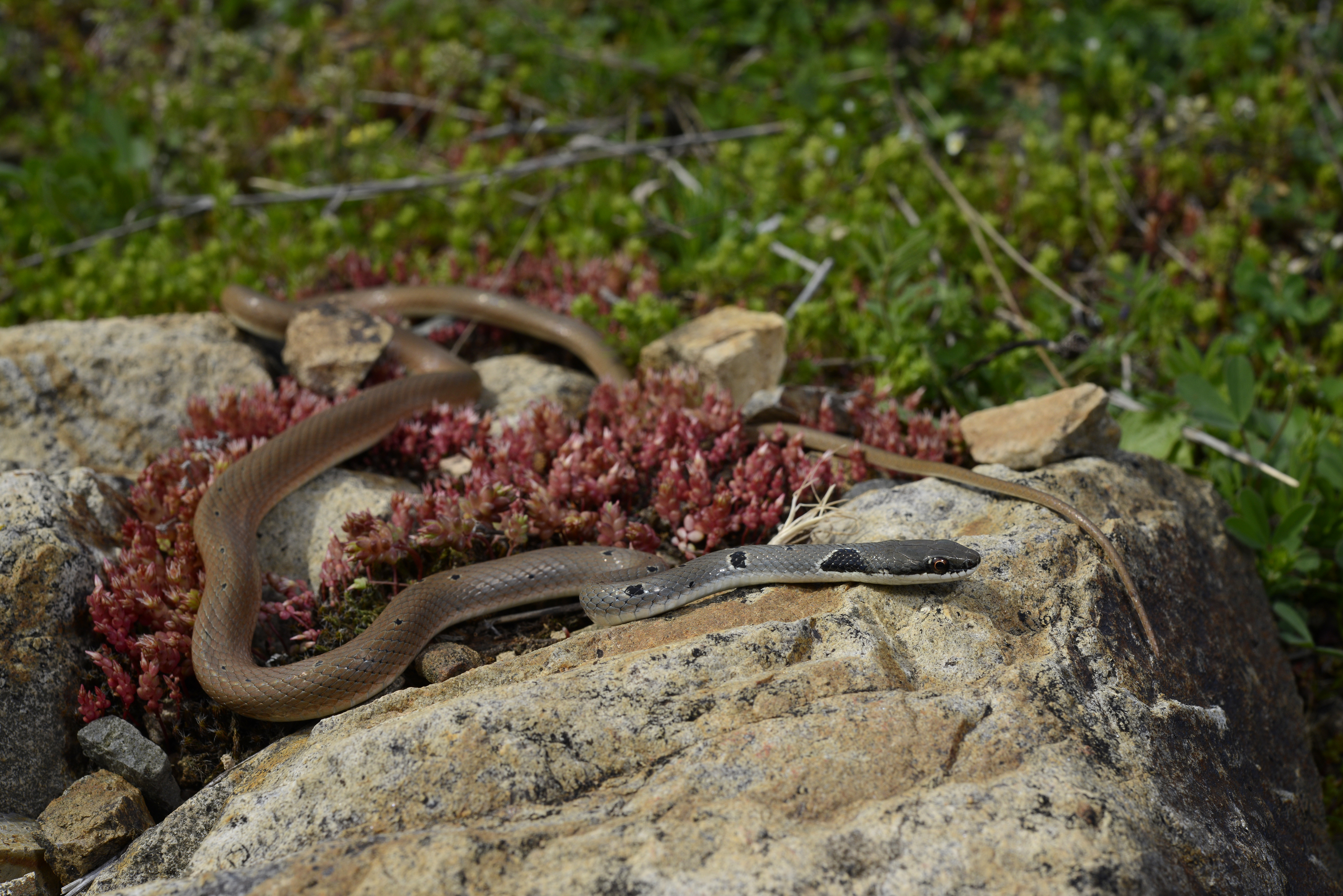

Conservation status
- Least Concern (IUCN 3.1)

Scientific classification
- Kingdom: Animalia
- Phylum: Chordata
- Class: Reptilia
- Order: Squamata
- Suborder: Serpentes
- Family: Colubridae
- Genus: Platyceps
- Species: P. collaris

Binomial name
- Platyceps collaris (Müller, 1878)

Synonyms
- Zamenis dahlii collaris Müller, 1878; Coluber dahlii rubriceps Venzmer, 1919; Coluber rubriceps Baran, 1976; Coluber collaris Schätti, Baran & Maunoir, 2001; Platyceps collaris Schätti & Monsch, 2004

= Red whip snake =

Species of snake

The red whip snake or collared dwarf racer (Platyceps collaris) is a species of snake in the family Colubridae. Native to the Middle East, its natural habitats are Mediterranean-type shrubby vegetation, rocky areas, arable land, pastureland, plantations, and rural gardens.

== Description ==
The red whip snake is a slender, long-tailed snake that grows to a length of 70 cm (28 in) in Europe but up to 100 cm (39 in) in the eastern part of its range in Asia. It closely resembles Dahl's whip snake but differs in having a smaller, flatter head. The upper surface is reddish-brown or reddish grey, with a dark band with pale margins on the neck and scattered, smaller dark bands with pale rims on the fore-parts, these markings being more widely spaced than those of Dahl's whip snake. Another distinguishing feature is the fact that the scales on the belly of that species have a keel on each side whereas the belly scales on the red whip snake do not. The eye is surrounded by a ring of pale skin and the area of skin in front of and behind this is dark. The underparts are whitish-yellow.

== Distribution and habitat ==
The red whip snake is native to Bulgaria, Israel, Jordan, Lebanon, Palestinian Territory, Syria, and Turkey. It is typically found on dry rocky areas such as coastal plains with low scrub, bushes and other vegetation. It is also found on agricultural land and in gardens, and its altitudinal range is from sea level up to 1,500 metres (4,900 ft).

== Behaviour ==
The red whip snake is a diurnal species. It can move very rapidly, running at prey and grabbing it with its jaws. It feeds mostly on lizards, with large insects supplementing the diet. Females lay clutches of three to five cylindrical eggs 25 to 30 mm (1.0 to 1.2 in) long and 8 to 9 mm (0.3 to 0.4 in) wide.

== Status ==
The International Union for Conservation of Nature has listed the red whip snake as being of least conservation concern. This is on the basis that the population trend is steady, the snake has a large total population spread out over a wide range, it is common in many areas and tolerates some degree of habitat modification. It does not seem to face any particular threats although in some areas it is persecuted by humans.
