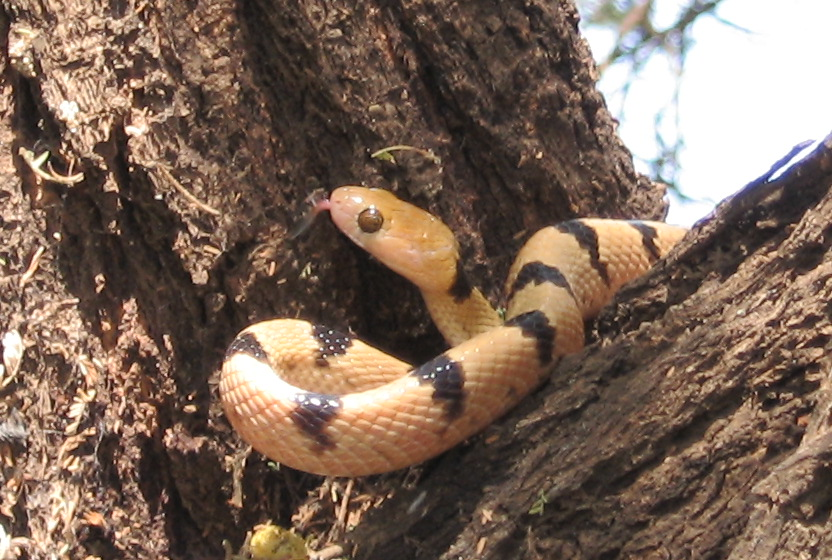
- T. semiannulatus in an acacia, central Tanzania

Scientific classification
- Kingdom: Animalia
- Phylum: Chordata
- Class: Reptilia
- Order: Squamata
- Suborder: Serpentes
- Family: Colubridae
- Subfamily: Colubrinae
- Genus: Telescopus; Wagler, 1830

Type species
- T. fallax Fleischmann, 1831

Synonyms
- Tarbophis Fleischmann, 1831

= Telescopus =

Genus of snakes

Telescopus, the Old World catsnakes, is a genus of 12 species of mildly venomous opisthoglyphous snakes in the family Colubridae.

== Geographic range ==
Species of the genus Telescopus are found from the Balkans and Pakistan through to southern and western Africa, plus two species in northern Eurasia.

== Description ==
The genus Telescopus is characterised by having a slender slightly flattened cylindrical body and attaining a total length (including tail) of between 80–180 cm (about 2.5–6 feet). They have medium-large eyes with vertical pupils, a typical feature of nocturnal reptiles, and have smooth dorsal scales. The dentition of the genus is as follows; typically 10–12 maxillary teeth, with a space before a pair of grooved fangs at the rear of the mouth, approximately level with the eyes. The anterior mandibular teeth are usually longer than the posterior mandibular teeth, perhaps to aid the arboreal species in catching and holding prey whilst in trees. The species are mostly drab, spotted snakes, but include the spectacular tiger snake (T. semiannulatus), which is orange in color with black saddles along its back.

== Habitat and Behaviour ==
The genus Telescopus includes both arboreal and terrestrial species, and can be found from sea level up to 2,000 metres (about 6,600 feet) above sea level. They are nocturnal hunting snakes with a distinct head and large eyes.

== Diet ==
The primary prey species of Telescopus are small lizards, including geckos, although some members of the genus may occasionally prey on small birds, rodents and amphibians.

== Reproduction ==
All species in the genus Telescopus are oviparous, laying clutches of 5–15 eggs.

== Venom ==
All species in the genus Telescopus are venomous, with the venom being of a neurotoxic nature; however, they are not considered particularly harmful to man. This is because the opisthoglyphous venom-delivery system is not as efficient as the delivery systems found in Elapidae and Viperidae. However, some members of the genus Telescopus such as T. dhara have particularly large venom glands, and the venom toxicity in some species has been compared to that of the Acanthophis species. For these reasons, it is advisable that all Telescopus species be handled with caution. It is also important to consider that allergic reactions are possible after a bite, and such reactions would significantly worsen the effects of an envenomation.

== Species ==
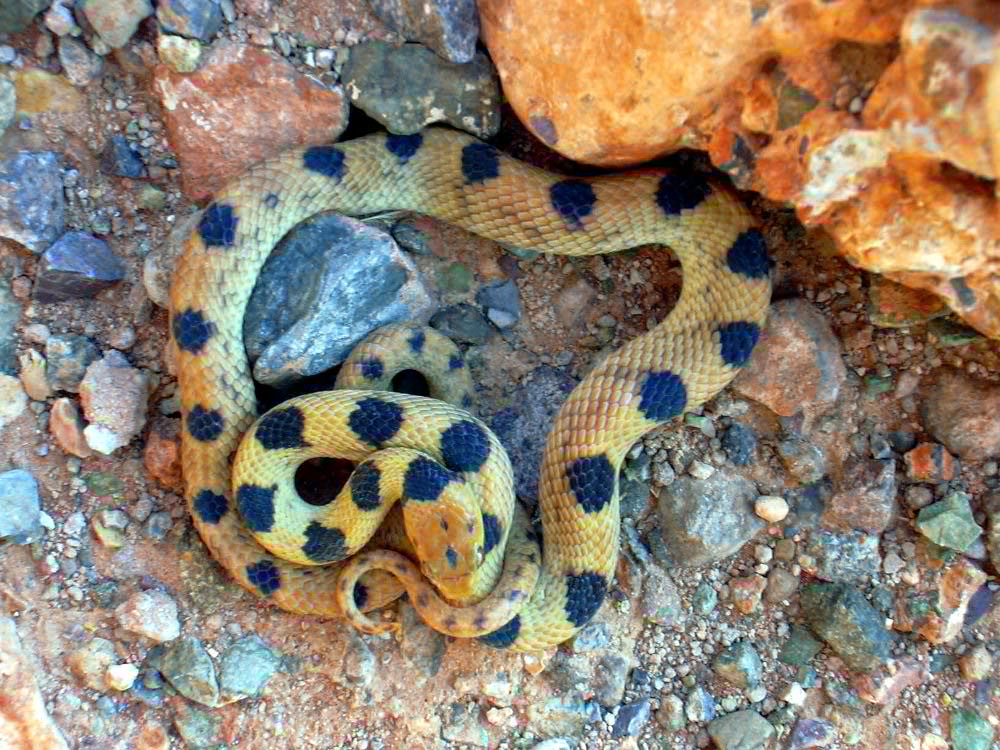
Telescopus beetzi – Beetz's tiger snake, also known as the Namib tiger snake

- Telescopus beetzi (Barbour, 1922) – Beetz's tiger snake, Karoo tiger snake, Namib tiger snake
- Telescopus dhara (Forskål, 1775) – Arabian cat snake, large-eyed cat snake, Israeli cat snake
- Telescopus fallax (Fleischmann, 1831) – European cat snake, Mediterranean cat snake
- Telescopus finkeldeyi Haacke, 2013 – Damara tiger snake
- Telescopus gezirae Broadley, 1994 - Blue Nile cat snake
- Telescopus hoogstraali K.P. Schmidt & Marx, 1956
- Telescopus nigriceps (Ahl, 1924) - black-headed snake
- Telescopus obtusus (Reuss, 1834) – Egyptian cat snake
- Telescopus pulcher (Scortecci, 1935) - beautiful cat snake
- Telescopus rhinopoma (Blanford, 1874) - Indian desert tiger snake
- Telescopus semiannulatus A. Smith, 1849 - common tiger snake, tiger cat snake, western tiger snake, eastern tiger snake
- Telescopus tessellatus (Wall, 1908) – Soosan tiger snake
- Telescopus tripolitanus (F. Werner, 1908)
- Telescopus variegatus (J.T. Reinhardt, 1843) - variable cat snake

Nota bene: A binomial authority in parentheses indicates that the species was originally described in a genus other than Telescopus.
