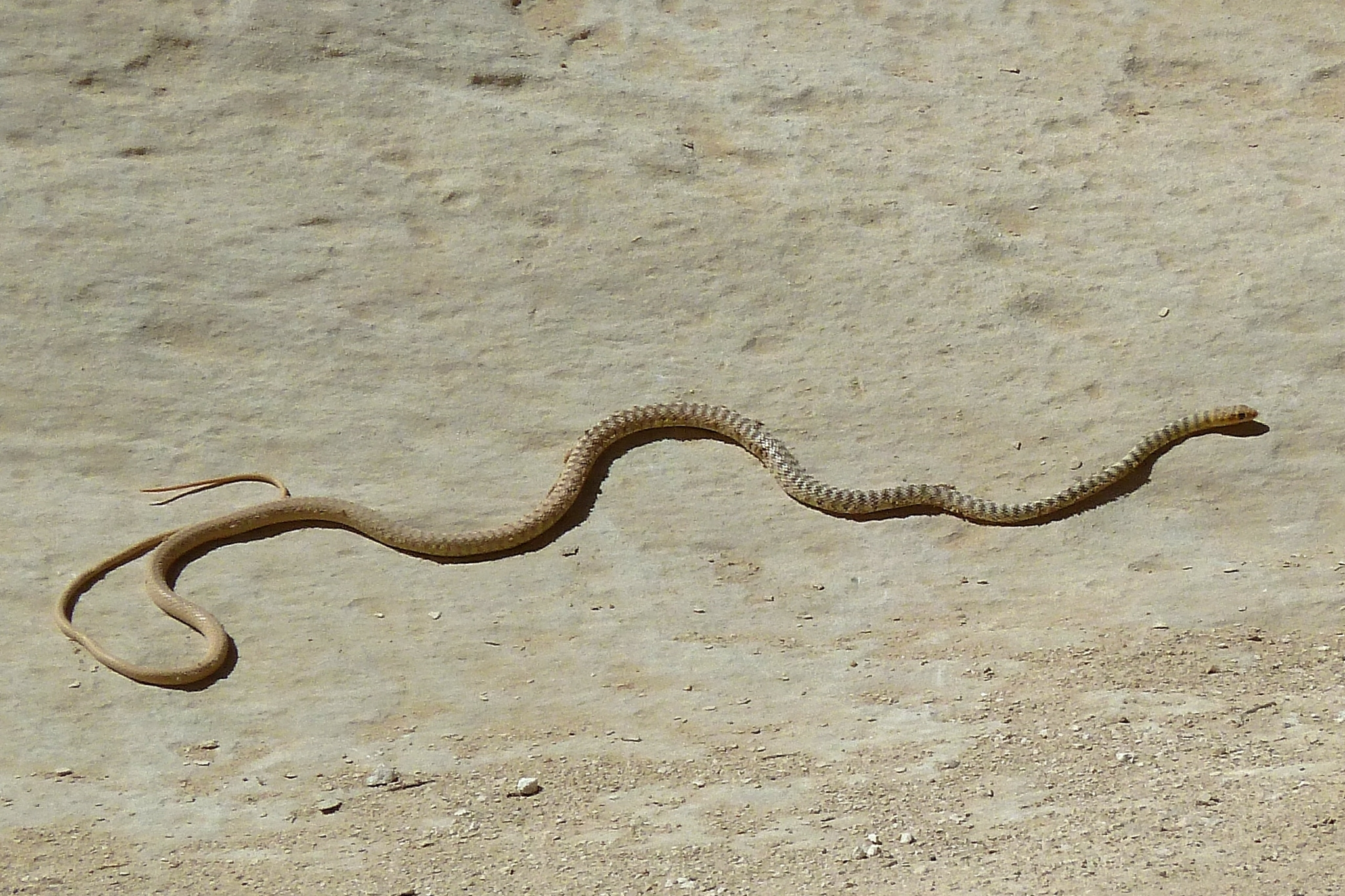
- Sahara Racer (Platyceps saharicus) in Israel

Conservation status
- Least Concern (IUCN 3.1)

Scientific classification
- Kingdom: Animalia
- Phylum: Chordata
- Class: Reptilia
- Order: Squamata
- Suborder: Serpentes
- Family: Colubridae
- Genus: Platyceps
- Species: P. saharicus

Binomial name
- Platyceps saharicus Schätti & McCarthy, 2004

= Platyceps saharicus =

Species of snake

Platyceps saharicus, saharan cliff racer is a species of snake of the family Colubridae.

The snake is found in Algeria, Libya, Chad, Sudan, Egypt, Israel, Jordan, and Saudi Arabia.

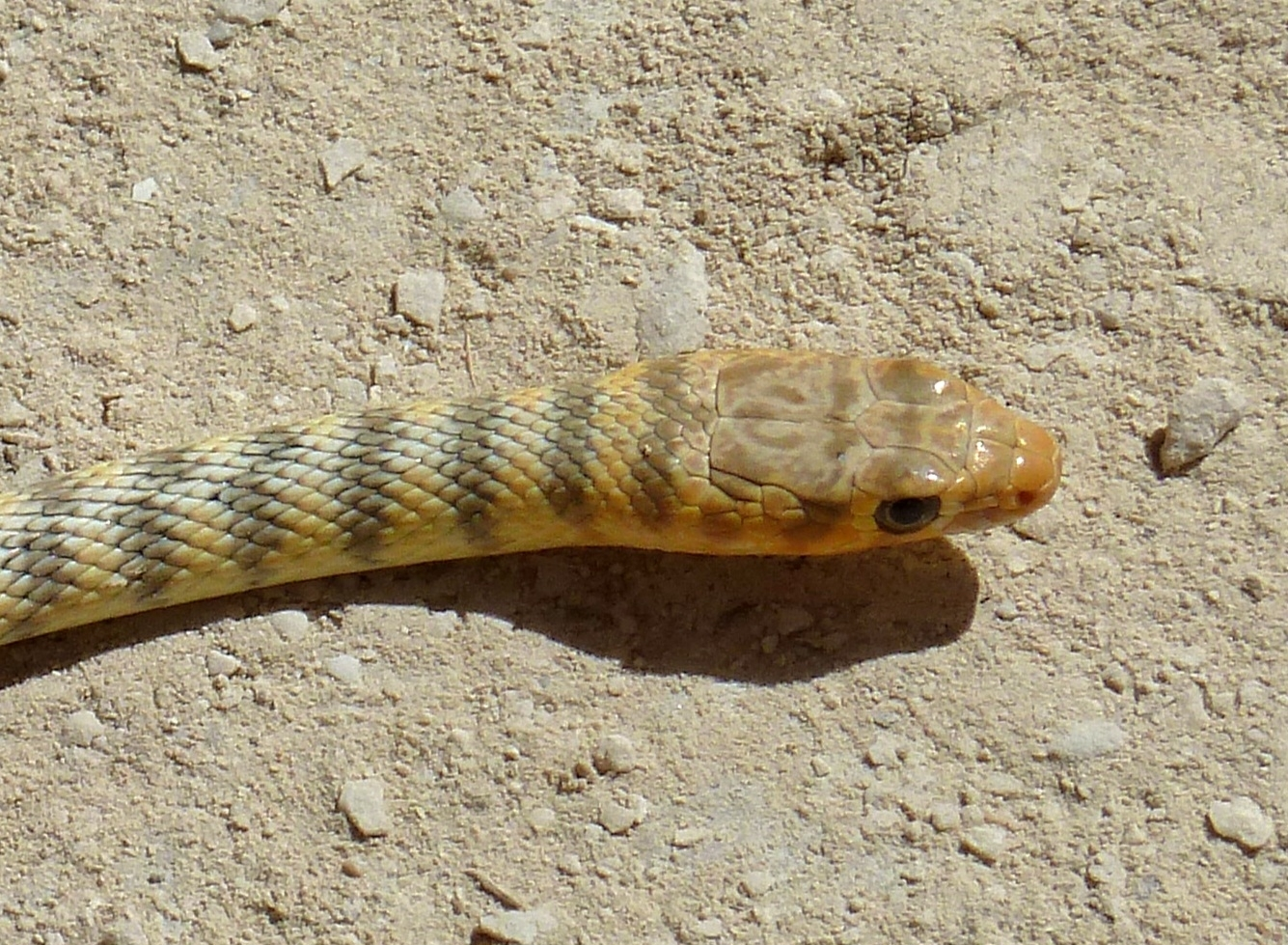
Head close-up, Israel
