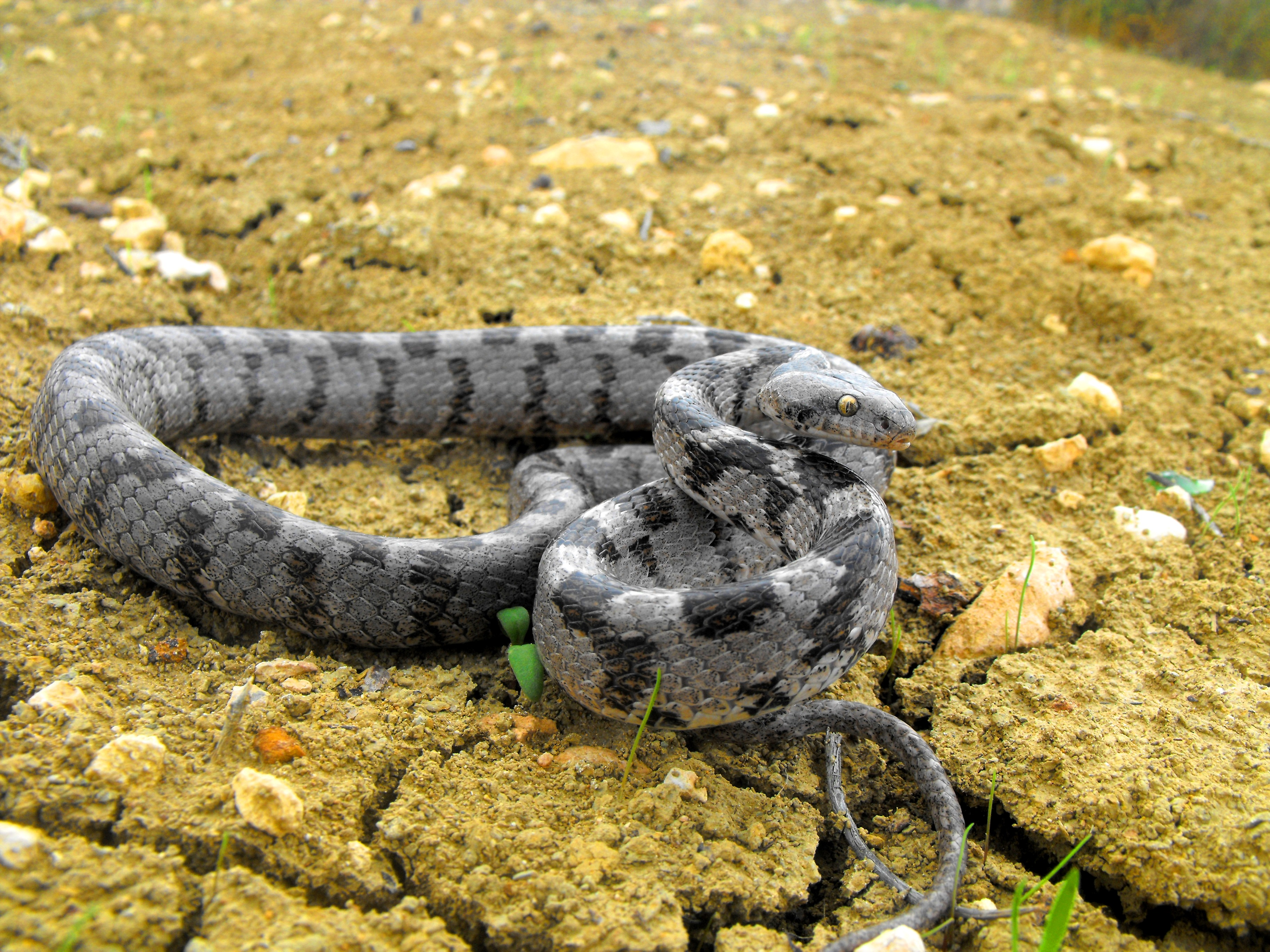
- Telescopus fallax from Malta

Conservation status
- Least Concern (IUCN 3.1)

Scientific classification
- Kingdom: Animalia
- Phylum: Chordata
- Class: Reptilia
- Order: Squamata
- Suborder: Serpentes
- Family: Colubridae
- Genus: Telescopus
- Species: T. fallax

Binomial name
- Telescopus fallax (Fleischmann, 1831)

Synonyms
- Tarbophis fallax Fleischmann, 1831; Coluber vivax Fitzinger, 1826; Trigonophis iberus Eichwald, 1831; Coluber carneus Dwigubsky, 1832; Ailurophis vivax — Bonaparte, 1837; Tarbophis savignyi Boulenger, 1896

= European cat snake =

Species of snake

The European cat snake (Telescopus fallax), or the Mediterranean cat snake, is a species of venomous snake belonging to the family Colubridae. This species is found in Southeastern Europe and Western Asia.

== Taxonomy ==
The European cat snake was first formally described as Tarbophis fallax in 1831 by the German naturalist Friedrich Ludwig Fleischmann with its type locality given as Dalmatia and Istria. Fitzinger had named Coluber fallax in 1826, which referred to this species, but this name is a nomen nudum. This species is now classified in the genus Telescopus which belongs to the subfamily Colubrinae of the family Colubridae.

== Distribution ==
The European cat snake is found in is southeastern Europe from the extreme northeastern part of Italy southwards along Adriatic coast of the Balkans to Albania, Northern Macedonia, Greece and southern Bulgaria. It can also be found on some Mediterranean islands such as Malta, Crete and Cyprus. In Western Asia its range extends from ranges from Turkey south to Israel, east to Iraq and Iran and north into the Caucasus Mountains as far as southern Russia. It was first recorded in Malta in 1894 and was thought to be an introduced species but recent studies have indicated it is native to the archipelago.

== Ecology and Biology ==
The European cat snake is venomous, but because it is rear-fanged (i.e. its fangs are located at the back of the upper jaw), its venom is not very effective against humans. Its venom can still be injected when biting if a body part is deep enough to attempt to swallow. It feeds mainly on geckos, lizards, and other snakes.

The species can be found in open and scrubby country including beaches and open woodlands. The species also inhabits mountainous areas.

European cat snakes can reach a length of up to 100 cm.

== Subspecies ==
5 subspecies are currently recognized.

- Telescopus fallax cyprianus (Barbour & Amaral, 1927) - Cyprus
- Telescopus fallax fallax (Fleischmann, 1831) - Northeastern Italy, Greece (Paros, Mykonos, Antiparos, Crete, Kalymnos, Samos, Kimolos, Milos, Corfu, Syros), Albania, coastal Croatia, Slovenia, Bosnia and Herzegovina, Montenegro, Macedonia, southern Bulgaria, Turkey, Malta, Cyprus, Iran, Iraq, Syria, Israel, southern Russia, Armenia, Republic of Georgia, and Azerbaijan.
- Telescopus fallax iberus (Eichwald, 1831) - Armenia, Azerbaijan, South Georgia, southern Russia, northern Iran, and East Turkey.
- Telescopus fallax pallidus (Stepanek, 1944) - Crete, Gavdos, Elasa and Christiana Islands.
- Telescopus fallax syriacus (Boettger, 1880) - Lebanon, Syria, Jordan, southeast Turkey and northern Israel.
