= Telescopus nigriceps =

Conservation status
- Least Concern (IUCN 3.1)

Scientific classification
- Kingdom: Animalia
- Phylum: Chordata
- Class: Reptilia
- Order: Squamata
- Suborder: Serpentes
- Family: Colubridae
- Genus: Telescopus
- Species: T. nigriceps

Binomial name
- Telescopus nigriceps (Ahl, 1924)

Species of snake

Telescopus nigriceps, the black-headed snake, is a species of snake of the family Colubridae.

The snake is found in Jordan, Iraq, Syria, Turkey, and Iran.
