= Telescopus hoogstraali =

Conservation status
- Endangered (IUCN 3.1)

Scientific classification
- Kingdom: Animalia
- Phylum: Chordata
- Class: Reptilia
- Order: Squamata
- Suborder: Serpentes
- Family: Colubridae
- Genus: Telescopus
- Species: T. hoogstraali

Binomial name
- Telescopus hoogstraali Schmidt & Marx, 1956

Synonyms
- Telescopus hoogstraali Schmidt & Marx, 1956; Telescopus fallax hoogstraali — Zinner, 1977; Telescopus hoogstraali — Venchi & Sindaco, 2006; Telescopus hoogstraali — Wallach et al., 2014

Species of snake

Telescopus hoogstraali, common names of which include Hoogstraal's cat snake and the Sinai cat snake, is an endangered species of snake in the family Colubridae. The species is native to the Middle East.

== Etymology ==
The specific name, hoogstraali, is in honor of American entomologist and parasitologist Harry Hoogstraal.

== Description ==
T. hoogstraali has a black-coloured neck and head. Its eyes are small with vertical, cat-like pupils. The snake's underbelly is grey and is covered with black spots.

== Geographic range ==
T. hoogstraali is found around the Sinai region, in Egypt and Israel, as well as Jordan.

In Egypt, it is found in Santa Catarina and Gebel Maghara of northern Sinai Peninsula, while in Israel it can be found only in Negev Desert. It is also known from one city in Jordan, Petra.

== Habitat ==
T. hoogstraali can be found at an elevation of 1,500 metres (4,900 ft) in natural habitats such as subtropical or tropical dry shrubland, subtropical or tropical dry lowland grassland, rocky areas, and hot deserts.

== Behaviour ==
T. hoogstraali is terrestrial.

== Reproduction ==
T. hoogstraali is oviparous.

== Conservation status ==
T. hoogstraali is threatened by habitat loss and distribution.
