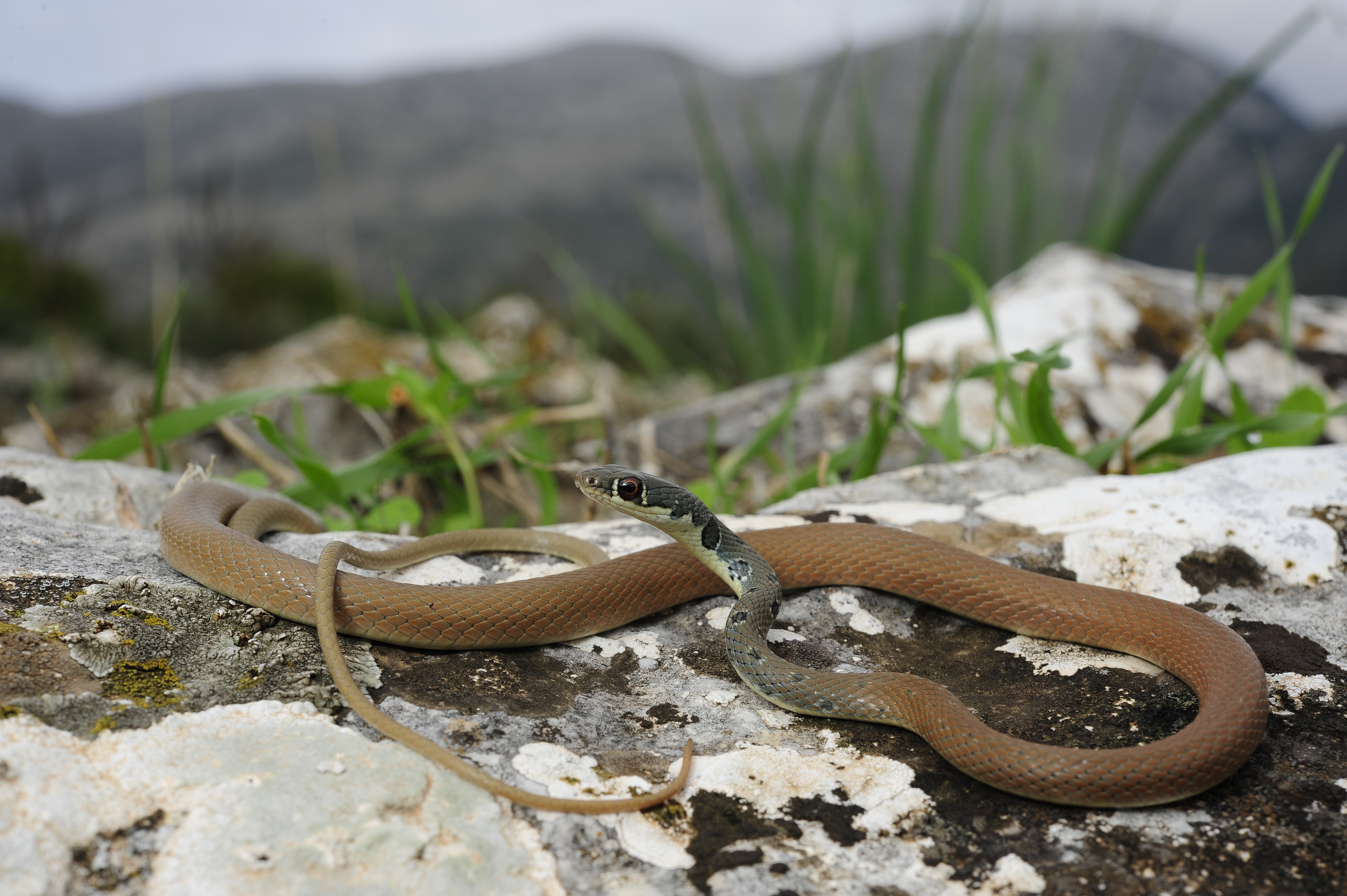

Conservation status
- Least Concern (IUCN 3.1)

Scientific classification
- Kingdom: Animalia
- Phylum: Chordata
- Class: Reptilia
- Order: Squamata
- Suborder: Serpentes
- Family: Colubridae
- Genus: Platyceps
- Species: P. najadum

Binomial name
- Platyceps najadum (Eichwald, 1831)
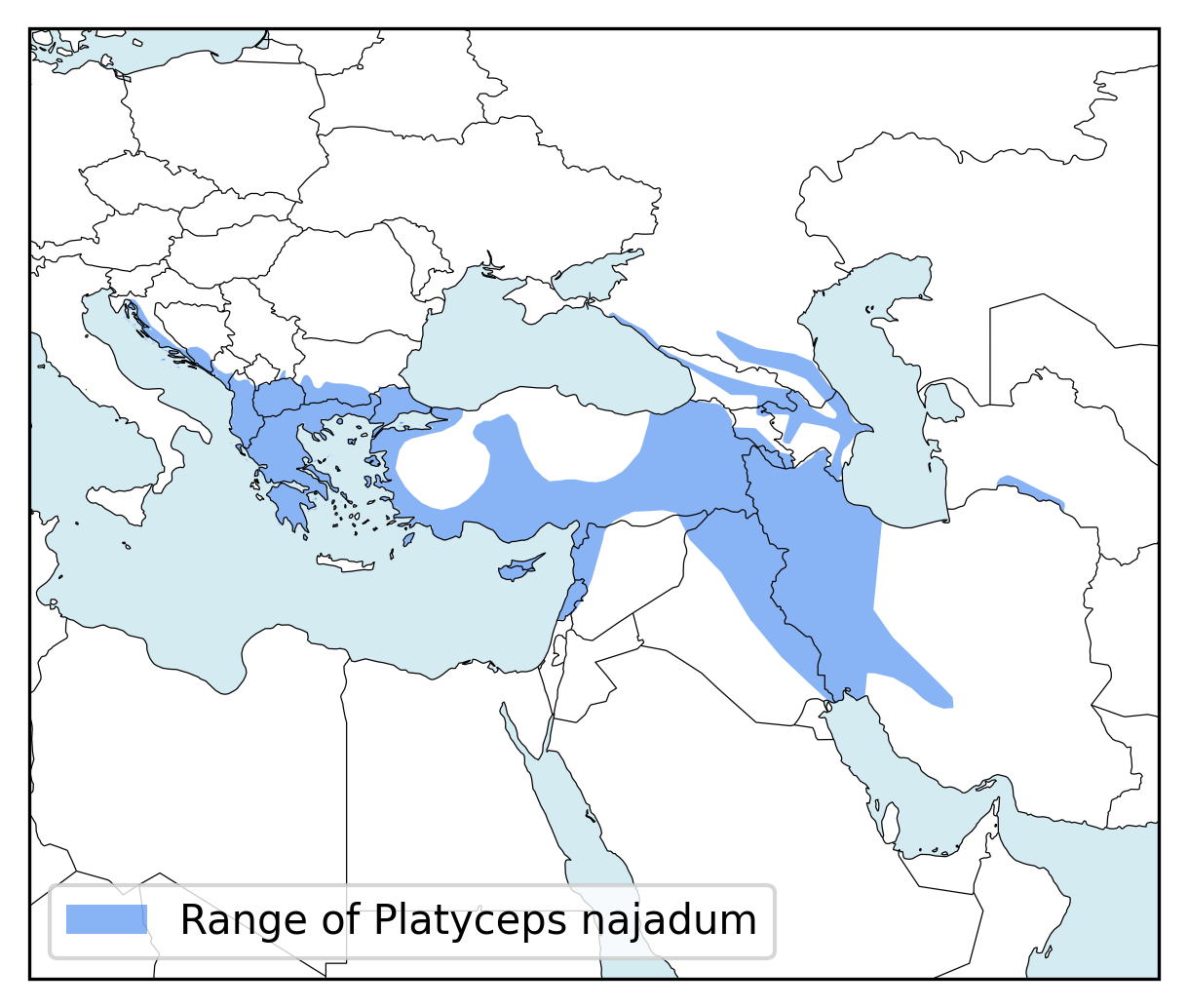

Synonyms
- Tyria najadum Eichwald, 1831; Coluber najadum — K.P. Schmidt, 1939; Platyceps najadum — Schätti & Monsch, 2004

= Platyceps najadum =

Species of snake

Platyceps najadum, also known commonly as Dahl's whip snake or the slender whip snake, is a species of non-venomous snake in the family Colubridae. The species is native to Eurasia. Four subspecies are recognized as valid.

== Taxonomy ==
P. najadum was first described by Karl Eichwald in 1831, as Tyria najadum.

== Geographic range ==
P. najadum is found in the Balkans, Aegean, Cyprus, the Mid-East, and as far as Turkmenistan and the Caucasus Mountains.

== Habitat ==
P. najadum occurs in dry and xeric environments in a wide range of habitats: in desert and rocky land, in forests, woodland scrub, and agricultural land from sea level to 2,000 m (6,600 ft) altitude. It is commonly found in fields, and seen crushed on roads.

== Description ==
P. najadum has a slim body, and is rarely over a metre (39 inches) in total length (including tail).

== Conservation status ==
P. najadum is threatened by direct persecution, forest fires and intensive agriculture, where its range interacts with human interests. The species is listed on Annex II of the Bern Convention and Annex IV of the European Union Habitats Directive. It has varying protection in some countries including Serbia, Montenegro, Russia, and Lebanon.

== Reproduction ==
P. najadum is an egg laying species. Females lay between 3 and 16 eggs in a clutch.

== Subspecies ==
Four subspecies are identified, including the nominotypical subspecies.

- Platyceps najadum albitemporalis (Darevsky & Orlov, 1994)
- Platyceps najadum dahlii (Fitzinger, 1826) – Balkans, Cyprus, Aegean Turkey
- Platyceps najadum kalymnensis (B. Schneider, 1979) – endemic to Kalymnos island, the Aegean
- Platyceps najadum najadum (Eichwald, 1831) – Caucasus and Asia Minor

A trinomial authority in parentheses indicates that the subspecies was originally described in a genus other than Platyceps.

== Etymology ==
Both the subspecific name, dahlii, and the common name, Dahl's whip snake, are in honor of Austrian entomologist Georg Dahl (1769–1831) who collected the type specimen in Dalmatia in 1824.

The subspecific name, schmidtleri, is in honor of German herpetologist Josef Friedrich Schmidtler (born 1942).

== Indigenous names ==
Σαϊτα (Greek), Saita, Стрелушка (Bulgarian), šilac (Croatian), Za'aman Z'eitani (Hebrew), Ok Yılanı (Turkish).
