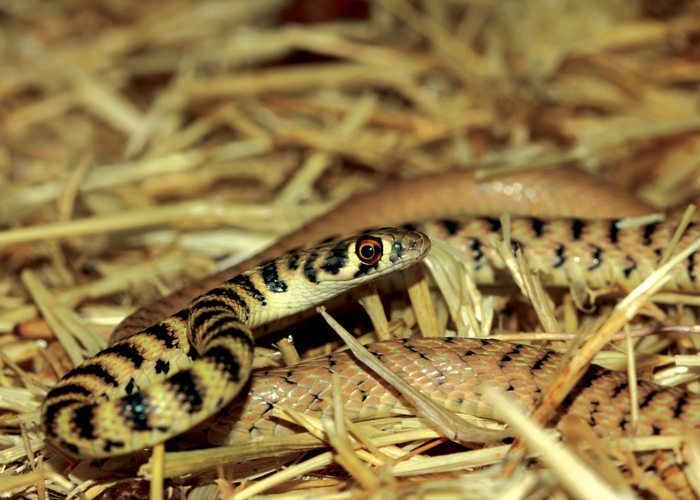
- Platyceps ventromaculatus, juvenile

Conservation status
- Least Concern (IUCN 3.1)

Scientific classification
- Kingdom: Animalia
- Phylum: Chordata
- Class: Reptilia
- Order: Squamata
- Suborder: Serpentes
- Family: Colubridae
- Genus: Platyceps
- Species: P. ventromaculatus

Binomial name
- Platyceps ventromaculatus (Gray, 1834)

Synonyms
- Coluber ventromaculatus Gray, 1834; Zamenis ventrimaculatus [sic] — Günther, 1859; Coluber ventrimaculatus — Corkill, 1932; Coluber ventromaculatus — Haas, 1957; Platyceps ventromaculatus — Schätti & Monsch, 2004; Argyrogena ventromaculatus — Sharma, 2004; Platyceps ventromaculatus — Nagy et al., 2004

= Hardwicke's rat snake =

Species of snake

Hardwicke's rat snake (Platyceps ventromaculatus), also known commonly as the glossy-bellied racer, Gray's rat snake, and the spotted bellied snake, is a species of snake in the family Colubridae. The species is native to Asia. There are three recognized subspecies.

== Geographic range ==
P. ventromaculatus is found in southern and southwestern Asia from northern India through Pakistan, southern Iran, and Iraq to Kuwait, Bahrain, and Saudi Arabia along the Persian Gulf. Its presence in Afghanistan, Uzbekistan, Syria, and Turkey requires confirmation.

== Status ==
P. ventromaculatus is not uncommon.

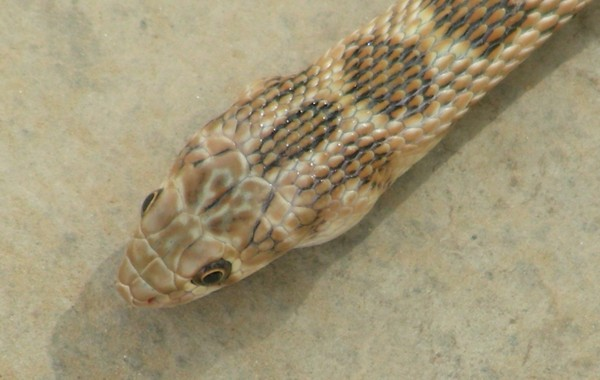
Closeup of head of glossy-bellied racer

== Description ==
P. ventromaculatus is a graceful snake with a smooth, round, elongate, gradually tapering body, and a tail more than one-fourth the total length. It has a moderately narrow head. It varies in colour and can be grey, olive-brown, olive-green, or dirty yellow. It has a series of black rhomboidal cross-bars running down the middle of the back. The scales forming the cross-bars normally have colour on the edges only. The sides of the body have similar smaller spots alternating with interspaces which may be broader or narrower than them. The belly is yellow to white with glossy scales.

The head is of the body-colour with or without symmetrical darkish markings. These may consist of:

- A blackish spot between the lores.
- A black streak obliquely placed below the eye.
- A black stripe from the temporal area to the gape.
- A cross-bar and two stripes on the nape.

=== Size ===
Adults are usually 90 to 120 cm (35 to 47 in) in total length (including tail), and have been recorded to grow up to 1.28 m (4.2 ft).

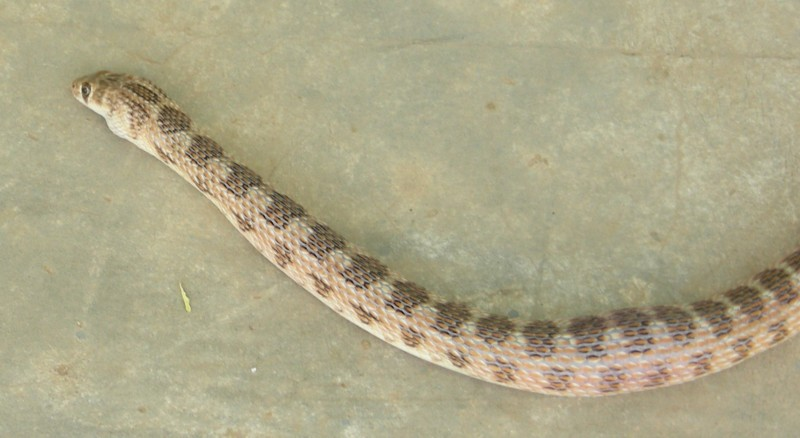
Body markings of glossy-bellied racer

=== Identifying characteristics ===
1. Dorsal scales in 19:19:15 or 13 rows.
2. Anal divided.
3. Supralabials (upper lip scales).
  1. The 4th, 5th and 6th touch the eye. The 4th and 9th are divided.
  2. In some rare cases, the 3rd and 8th may be divided in some case, with the 3rd, 4th and 5th touching the eye.
4. The nostril occupies two-thirds of the suture between the nostrils.
5. The tail is more than one-fourth the total length.

== Subspecies ==
The following three subspecies are recognized as being valid, including the nominotypical subspecies.

- Platyceps ventromaculatus bengalensis (M.S. Khan & A.Q. Khan, 2000) – India; Type locality: Bengal, description from Plate 80, figure 1 of Gray 1830–35; holotype destroyed.
- Platyceps ventromaculatus indusai (M.S. Khan & A.Q. Khan, 2000) – Pakistan; Type locality: Upper and lower Indus Valley.
- Platyceps ventromaculatus ventromaculatus (Gray, 1834)

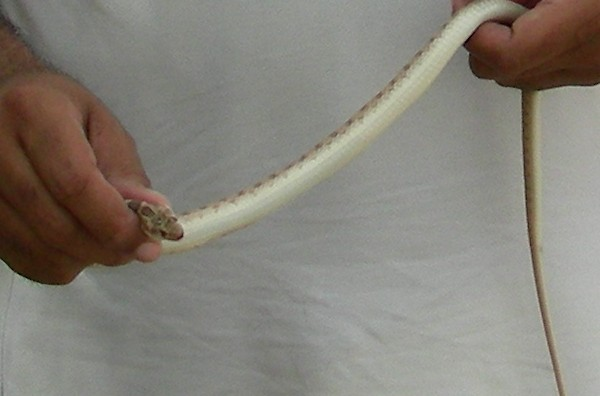
Yellow to white belly of glossy-bellied racer

Nota bene: A trinomial authority in parentheses indicates that the subspecies was originally described in a genus other than Platyceps.

== Habitat ==
P. ventromaculatus inhabits mainly stony hillsides, open or cultivated land, and sometimes congested urban areas. It has been recorded in Pokaran district in the Thar Desert also.

== Habits ==
P. ventromaculatus is a fast active snake, which gives rise to one of its common names, glossy-bellied racer. It is normally seen in open country. When alarmed, it quickly retreats into cover. It hibernates in winter. It has been known to live as long as five years.

=== Diet ===
P. ventromaculatus largely preys upon geckos and other lizards.

== Reproduction ==
P. ventromaculatus is oviparous. Gravid females have been obtained in early summer. About 9 eggs are laid. They hatch around September. The young snakes are 30–33 centimetres (12–13 in) long.

== Local names ==
- Arabic – Dawaid-al-khail.
- Urdu – Sagi.

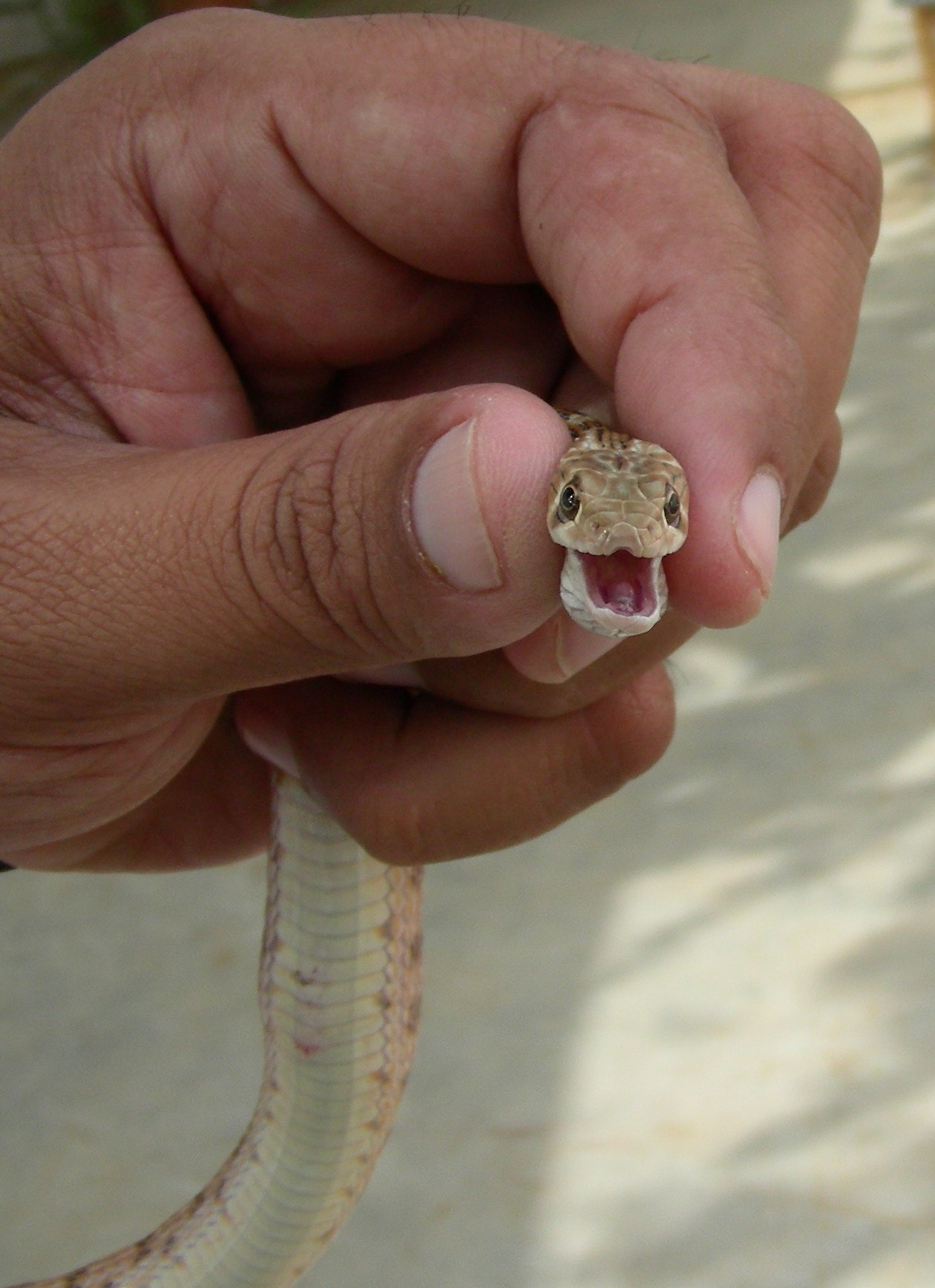
A glossy-bellied racer held in the hand
