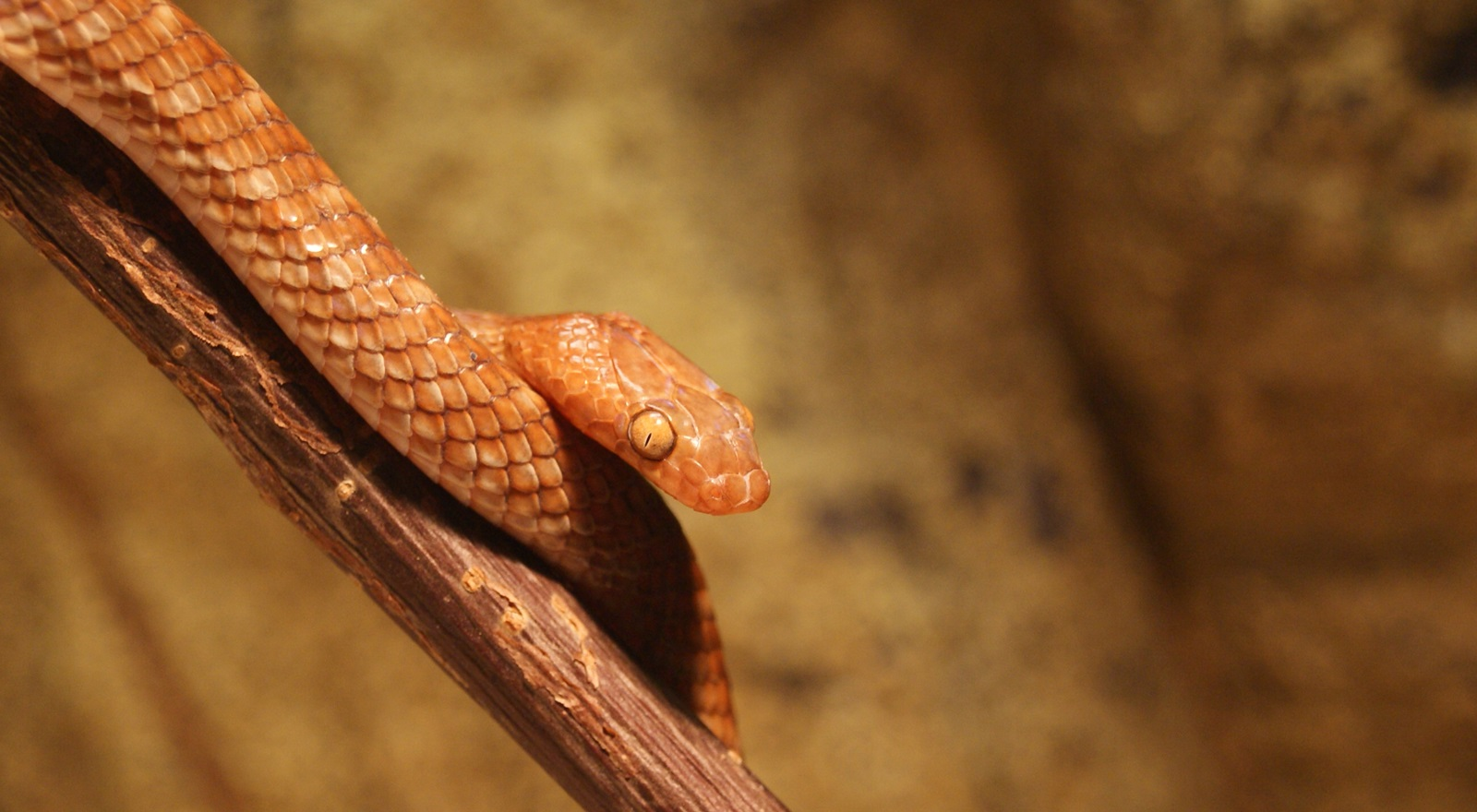

Conservation status
- Least Concern (IUCN 3.1)

Scientific classification
- Kingdom: Animalia
- Phylum: Chordata
- Class: Reptilia
- Order: Squamata
- Suborder: Serpentes
- Family: Colubridae
- Genus: Telescopus
- Species: T. dhara

Binomial name
- Telescopus dhara (Forsskål, 1775)

= Arabian cat snake =

Species of snake

The Arabian cat snake, large-eyed cat snake, or Israeli cat snake (Telescopus dhara) is a species of snake of the family Colubridae.

== Geographic range ==
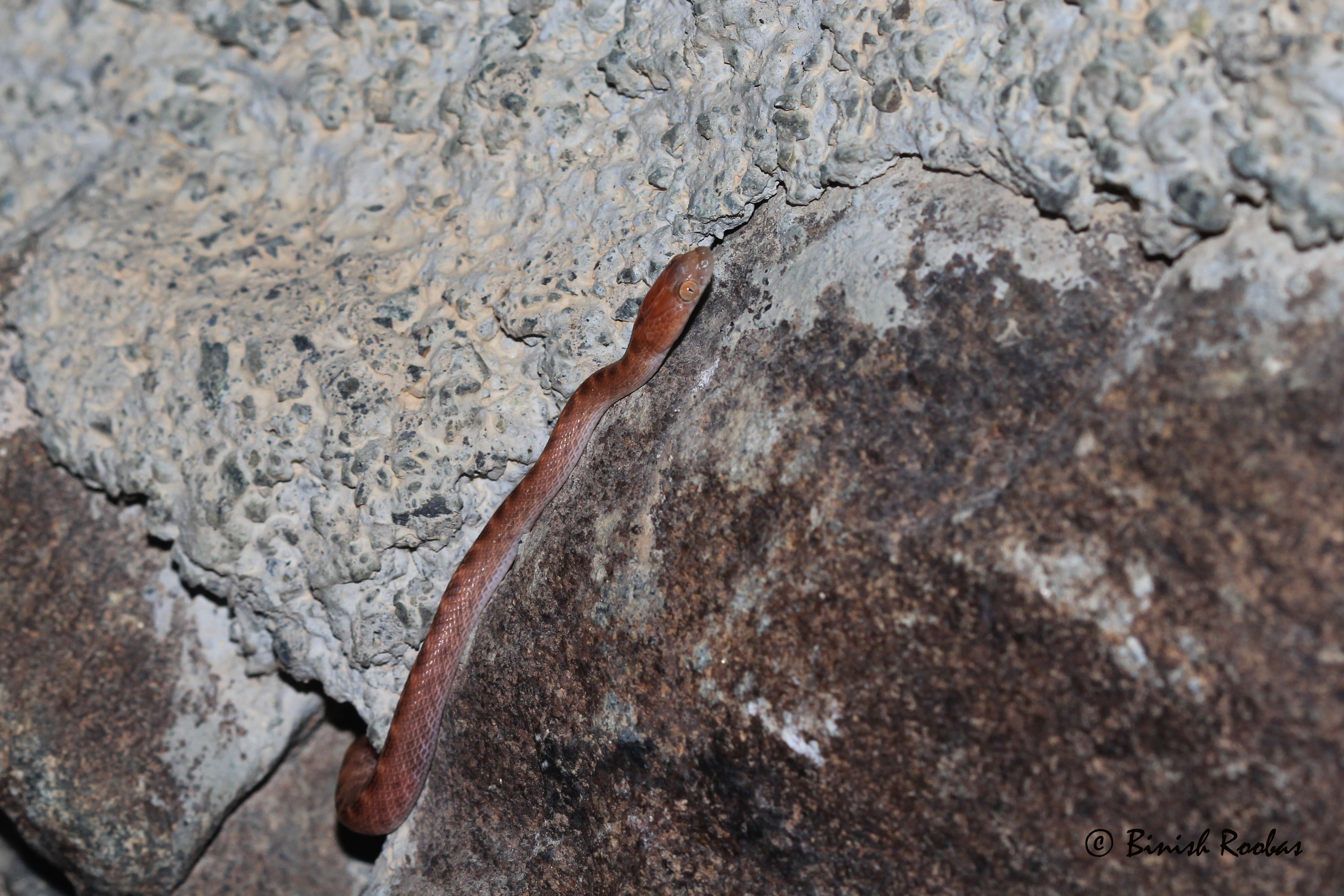
Arabian cat snake from United Arab Emirates

This snake is found in Africa, Arabia and the Middle East.
