= Platyceps rogersi =

Conservation status
- Least Concern (IUCN 3.1)

Scientific classification
- Kingdom: Animalia
- Phylum: Chordata
- Class: Reptilia
- Order: Squamata
- Suborder: Serpentes
- Family: Colubridae
- Genus: Platyceps
- Species: P. rogersi

Binomial name
- Platyceps rogersi (Anderson, 1893)

Species of snake

Platyceps rogersi, Rogers's racer, is a species of snake of the family Colubridae.

The snake is found in Libya, Egypt, Israel, Jordan, Lebanon, Syria, and Iraq.
