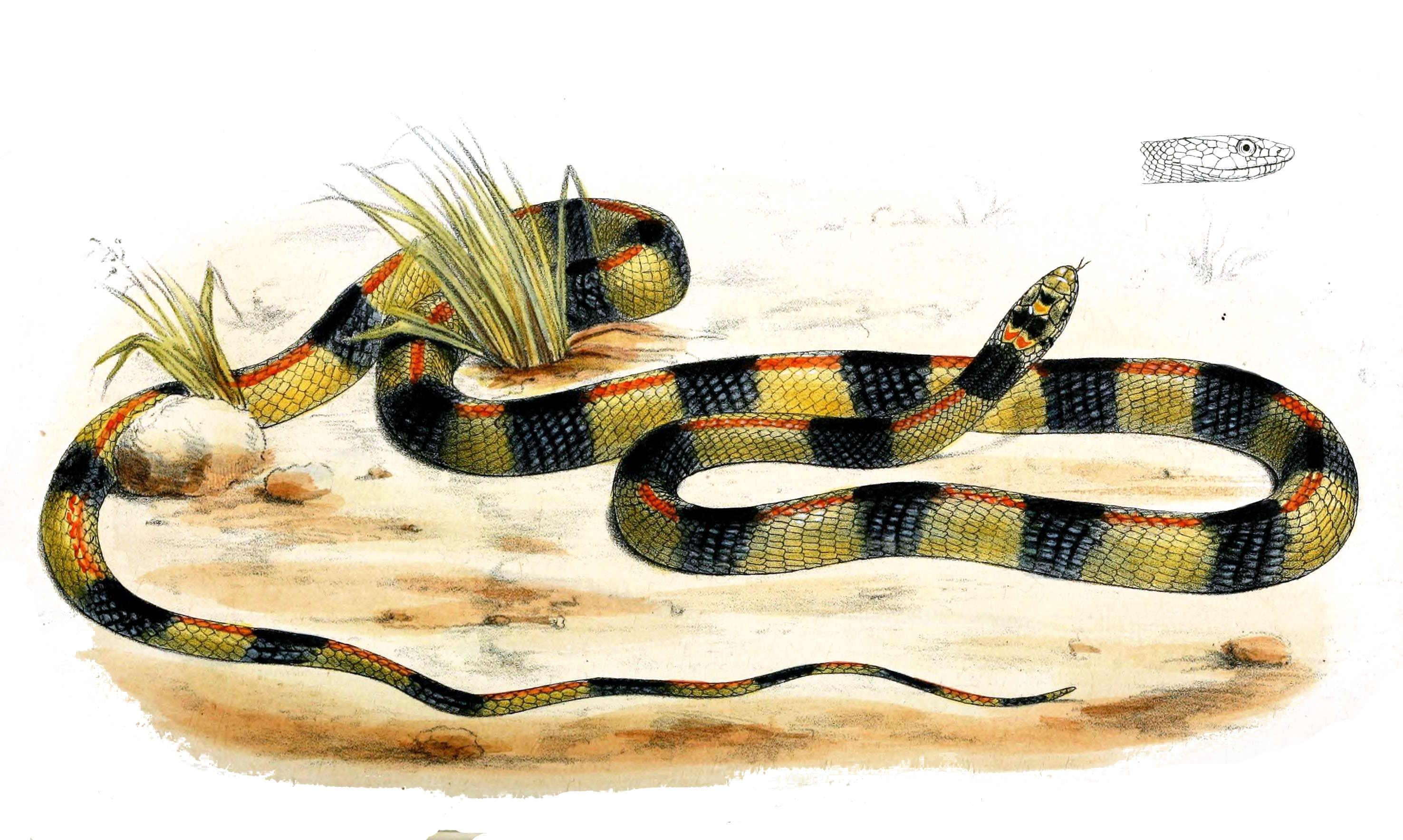

Conservation status
- Least Concern (IUCN 3.1)

Scientific classification
- Kingdom: Animalia
- Phylum: Chordata
- Class: Reptilia
- Order: Squamata
- Suborder: Serpentes
- Family: Colubridae
- Genus: Platyceps
- Species: P. elegantissimus

Binomial name
- Platyceps elegantissimus (Günther, 1878)

= Elegant racer =

Species of snake

Platyceps elegantissimus is a species of snake of the family Colubridae. It is commonly known as the elegant racer.

== Geographic range ==
The snake is found along the southern Israel-Jordan border from the Dead Sea to the Gulf of Aqaba, in the southern part of Jordan, and in a major part of the northwest of Saudi Arabia.

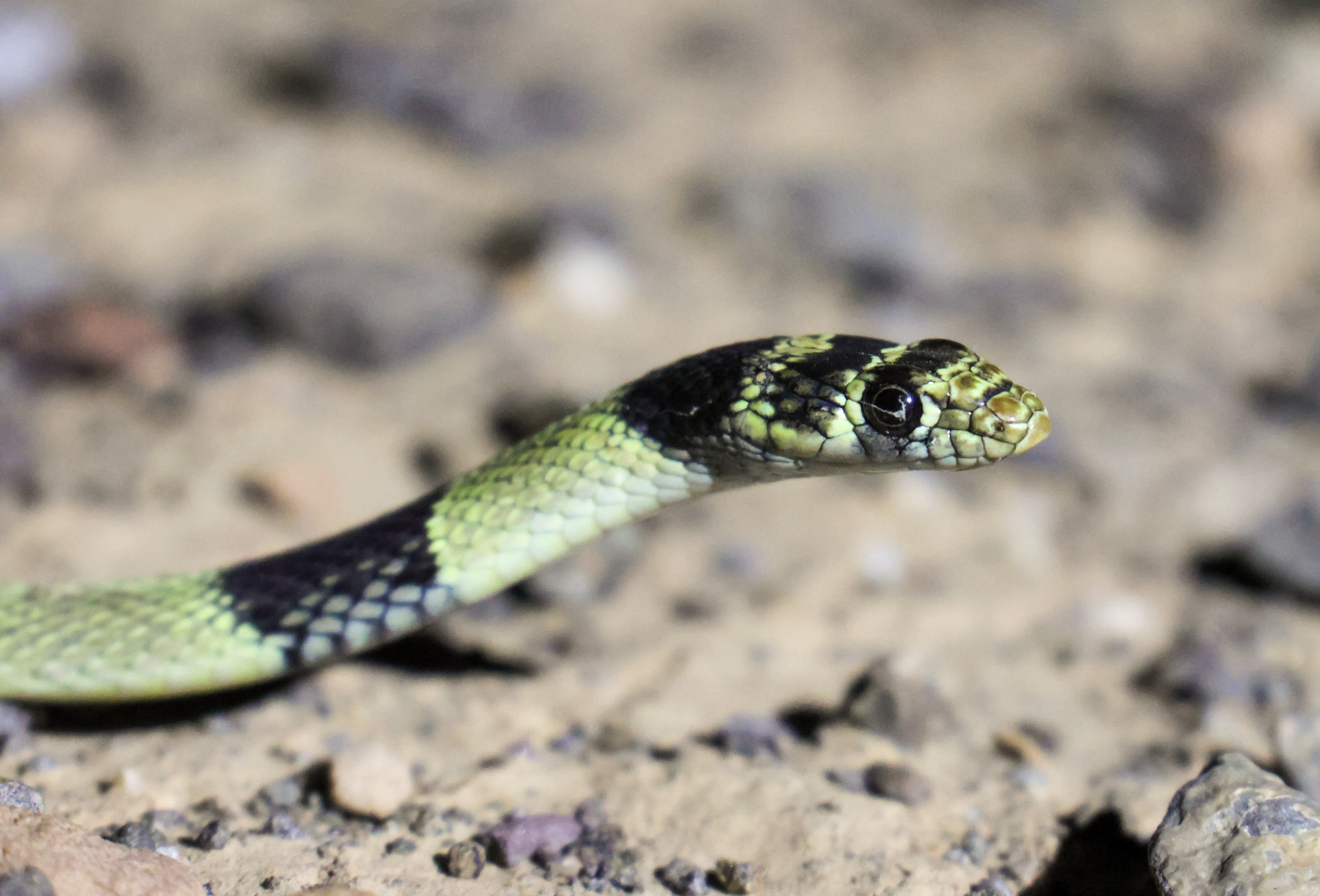
Elegant Racer from Eastern Saudi Arabia
