= Platyceps ladacensis =

Scientific classification
- Kingdom: Animalia
- Phylum: Chordata
- Class: Reptilia
- Order: Squamata
- Suborder: Serpentes
- Family: Colubridae
- Genus: Platyceps
- Species: P. ladacensis

Binomial name
- Platyceps ladacensis (Anderson, 1871)

Species of snake

Platyceps ladacensis, the braid snake or Jan's cliff racer, is a species of snake of the family Colubridae.

The snake is found in Asia.
