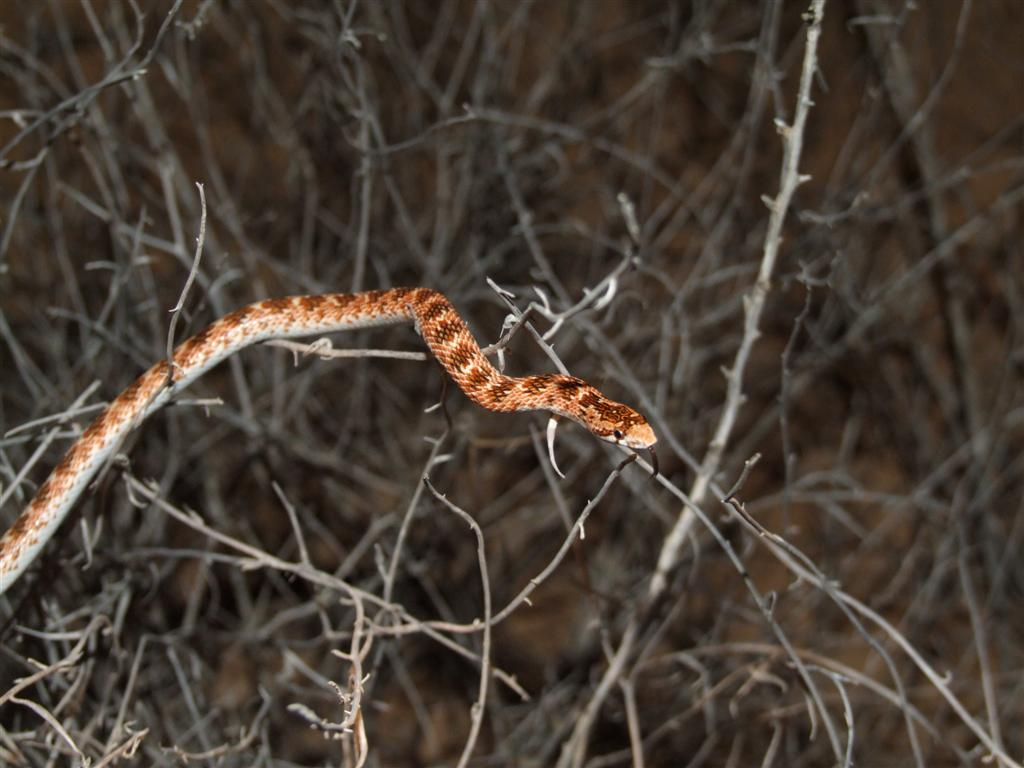

Conservation status
- Least Concern (IUCN 3.1)

Scientific classification
- Kingdom: Animalia
- Phylum: Chordata
- Class: Reptilia
- Order: Squamata
- Suborder: Serpentes
- Family: Colubridae
- Genus: Lytorhynchus
- Species: L. diadema

Binomial name
- Lytorhynchus diadema (A. M. C. Duméril, Bibron, and A. H. A. Duméril, 1854)

= Lytorhynchus diadema =

Species of snake

Lytorhynchus diadema, the crowned leafnose snake, diademed sand snake, or awl-headed snake, is a non-venomous snake found in Middle East, North Africa & West Asia.

== Description ==
Lytorhynchus diadema adults range from 30-51 cm in length.

Pale buff or cream color above, with a series of 13 – 18 large transversely rhomboidal dark spots; a dark median band along the head and nape, sometimes confluent with an interocular transverse band; an oblique dark band from the eye to the angle of the mouth; lower parts uniform white.

== Distribution ==
Algeria, Egypt, Iran, Iraq, Israel, Jordan, Kuwait, Libya, Morocco, Niger, Oman, Saudi Arabia, Tunisia, United Arab Emirates, Yemen, Mauritania, West Sahara.

This species is found in sandy desert, semi-desert, sandy coastal areas, areas of high grassland plateaus (especially those close to rocky areas), and clay plateaus with rocks. This species digs, but is not considered fossorial In Arabia it appears to occur in a wide range of dry habitats.

== Diet ==
It feeds mainly on lizards but will eat large arthropods, insects and young rodents.

== Reproduction ==
The species is oviparous, laying clutches of three to five eggs.
