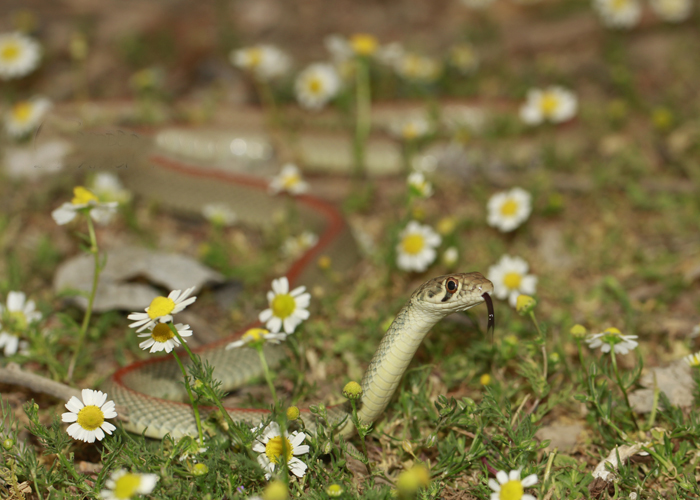

Conservation status
- Least Concern (IUCN 3.1)

Scientific classification
- Kingdom: Animalia
- Phylum: Chordata
- Class: Reptilia
- Order: Squamata
- Suborder: Serpentes
- Family: Colubridae
- Genus: Platyceps
- Species: P. rhodorachis

Binomial name
- Platyceps rhodorachis (Jan, 1865)

Synonyms
- List: Coluber rhodorachis kashmirensis Khan & Khan, 2000; Eremiophis rhodorhachis; Zamenis rhodorhachis var. tessellata Werner, 1910; Zamenis ladacensis var. subnigra Boettger, 1893; Gonyosoma dorsale Anderson, 1872; Zamenis rhodorachis Jan, 1863; Platyceps semifasciatus Blyth, 1860; Zamenis ventromaculatus Günther, 1858; Etairejus rhodorachis Jan, 1857

= Platyceps rhodorachis =

Braid Snake

Species of snake

Platyceps rhodorachis the common cliff racer, Wadi racer, desert racer, braid snake, or Jan's cliff racer, is a species of snake found in Central Asia. Two subspecies are recognized: P. r. rhodorachis, the nominate subspecies, and P. l. subniger.
