= Joseph Richard Slevin =

American herpetologist (1881-1957)

Joseph R. Slevin
- Slevin studying reptile specimens in 1953
- Born: September 13, 1881; San Francisco, California
- Died: February 17, 1957 (aged 75); San Francisco, California
- Education: Saint Mary's College, Kansas
- Scientific career
- Fields: Herpetology
- Workplaces: California Academy of Sciences

Joseph Richard Slevin (September 13, 1881 – February 17, 1957) was an American herpetologist and the second curator of herpetology at the California Academy of Sciences, with which he was affiliated for over 50 years. He collected reptile and amphibian specimens from around the world, notably in the Galápagos Islands in a 17-month expedition, and was largely responsible for re-growing the academy's herpetological collection following its destruction in the 1906 San Francisco earthquake. He wrote or co-wrote nearly 60 scientific papers, and is commemorated in the scientific names of over a dozen species or subspecies of animals and plants.

== Early life ==
Slevin was born in San Francisco, California, and attended St. Ignatius High School. His father, Thomas E. Slevin, was an amateur ornithologist and member of the California Academy of Sciences. Joseph studied classical languages at Saint Mary's College in Kansas, then enlisted in the United States Navy. By 1904 he had served his term and completed around 20 voyages with the Oceanic Steamship Company, a shipping company that operated between San Francisco, Hawaii, and Australia.

== Galápagos expedition ==
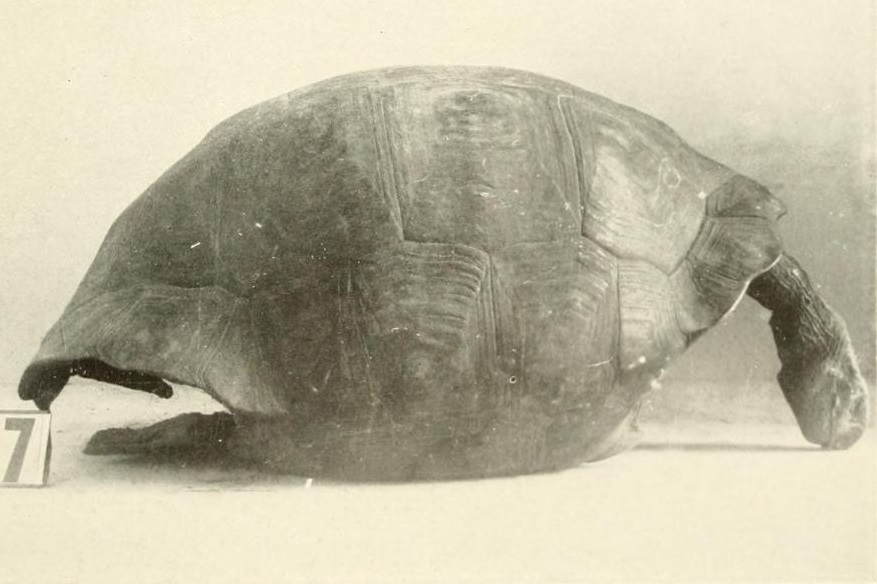
A Galápagos tortoise specimen (Chelonoidis nigra vicina) collected by Slevin on Isabela Island in 1906

In 1904, Slevin was hired by the Academy of Sciences and trained by John Van Denburgh as a scientific collector. In June 1905 the academy embarked upon a 17-month research expedition to the Galápagos Islands and other Pacific islands with a crew of eight scientists led by Rollo H. Beck; Slevin was in charge of reptiles. The purpose of the voyage was to study the geology of the islands as well as collect plants, mollusks, insects, birds, mammals, and reptiles, and, as Van Denburgh wrote, "to spare no effort to secure specimens or remains of those races of the gigantic land tortoises which long had been thought extinct." The voyage made brief stops at islands off of Baja California and the islands of San Benedicto, Socorro, Clipperton, and Cocos before arriving in Española (also called Hood Island) in the Galápagos on September 24, 1905. During the subsequent year, the expedition found living tortoises on nearly all islands where they had previously been recorded, and living tortoises or their remains for the first time on three islands (Fernandina, Rábida, and Santa Fe). Slevin, aided by 18-year-old assistant herpetologist Ernest Samuel King, took detailed notes on the biology of the animals he collected. Biologists Thomas and Patricia Fritts, who later edited and published Slevin's field notes, write that although he was "first and foremost a collector of reptiles, he was also a conscientious naturalist who recorded observations in a manner uncharacteristic of the times."

During the expedition, the academy was nearly destroyed by the 1906 San Francisco earthquake and subsequent fires, and the collection of reptiles and amphibians was reduced from over 8,000 specimens to only 13. After a full year of exploring the islands, the expedition left the archipelago on September 25, 1906, and returned to San Francisco on November 29 of that year. Slevin, King, and others had collected over 4,500 reptiles–nearly 4,000 from the Galápagos alone–which Van Denburgh called "by far the largest and most important collections ever gathered on these islands." In addition to his field observations, Slevin published the ship's logbook, which is of historic value to students of the Galápagos.

Slevin returned to the Galápagos Islands to collect again in 1928–1929.

== Other work ==
Slevin also collected specimens throughout the western United States and Mexico as well as Central America and Australia. Biologist Vasco M. Tanner writes Slevin was largely responsible for collecting and preserving the more than 75,000 specimens housed in the academy by the time of his death.

During World War I, Slevin served as a submarine commander in the Navy, and in 1928 succeeded Van Denburgh as curator of academy herpetology collections. He tried to re-enlist during World War II but was denied due to his age, and instead did contract work for the Navy in the academy's instrument shop. He produced 58 scientific publications, including 12 co-authored with Van Denburgh and was elected an honorary member of the academy in 1954. He is commemorated in the scientific names of 12 species or subspecies of snakes and lizards, as well as Slevin's mouse (Peromyscus slevini) and several species of invertebrates and plants.

== Eponymous taxa ==
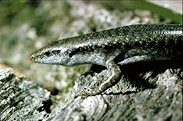
Slevin's skink (Emoia slevini)

The taxa (species and subspecies) named after Slevin are listed chronologically below, followed by author(s) and year of naming, and common name if applicable. Taxa are listed as originally described: subsequent research may have reassigned taxa or rendered some as invalid synonyms of previously named taxa.

- Antillophis slevini Van Denburgh 1912 (= Pseudalsophis slevini) – banded Galápagos snake, Slevin's snake
- Sauromalus slevini Van Denburgh, 1922 – Monserrat chuckwalla
- Bulimulus slevini Hanna, 1923 – a land snail
- Neomammillaria slevinii Britton & Rose (1923) (syn. of Mammillaria albicans) – a cactus
- Olpium slevini Chamberlin, 1923 – a pseudoscorpion
- Agave sleviniana I.M.Johnst. (1924) (syn. of Agave sobria) – an agave
- Megachile slevini Cockerell, 1924 – a leafcutter bee
- Peromyscus slevini Mailliard, 1924 – Slevin's mouse
- Trachypachus slevini Van Dyke, 1925 – a ground beetle
- Dryadophis melanolomus slevini Stuart, 1933 (= Mastigodryas melanolomus slevini) – Slevin's lizard eater
- Amphisbaena slevini Schmidt, 1936 – Slevin's worm lizard
- Sceloporus slevini H.M. Smith, 1936 – Slevin's bunchgrass lizard
- Trimetopon slevini Dunn, 1940 – Slevin's tropical ground snake
- Lygosoma slevini Loveridge, 1941 (= Nannoscincus slevini) – Slevin's dwarf skink, Slevin's elf skink
- Hypsiglena slevini W. Tanner, 1943 – Baja California night snake
- Coleonyx variegatus slevini Klauber, 1943 – Slevin's banded gecko
- Alastoroides slevini Bohart, 1948 – a potter wasp now in the genus Hypalastoroides
- Masticophis slevini Lowe & Norris, 1955 – San Esteban Island whipsnake
- Stenodactylus slevini G. Haas, 1957 – Slevin's sand gecko, Slevin's short-fingered gecko
- Emoia slevini W.C. Brown & Falanruw, 1972 – Mariana skink, Slevin's brown skink, Slevin's emo skink, Slevin's skink
