= S. slevini =

S. slevini may refer to:

- Sauromalus slevini, the Monserrat chuckwalla, a large lizard species
- Sceloporus slevini, a spiny lizard species in the genus Sceloporus
- Stenodactylus slevini, the Slevin's short-fingered gecko, a reptile species

== See also ==
- Slevini (disambiguation)
