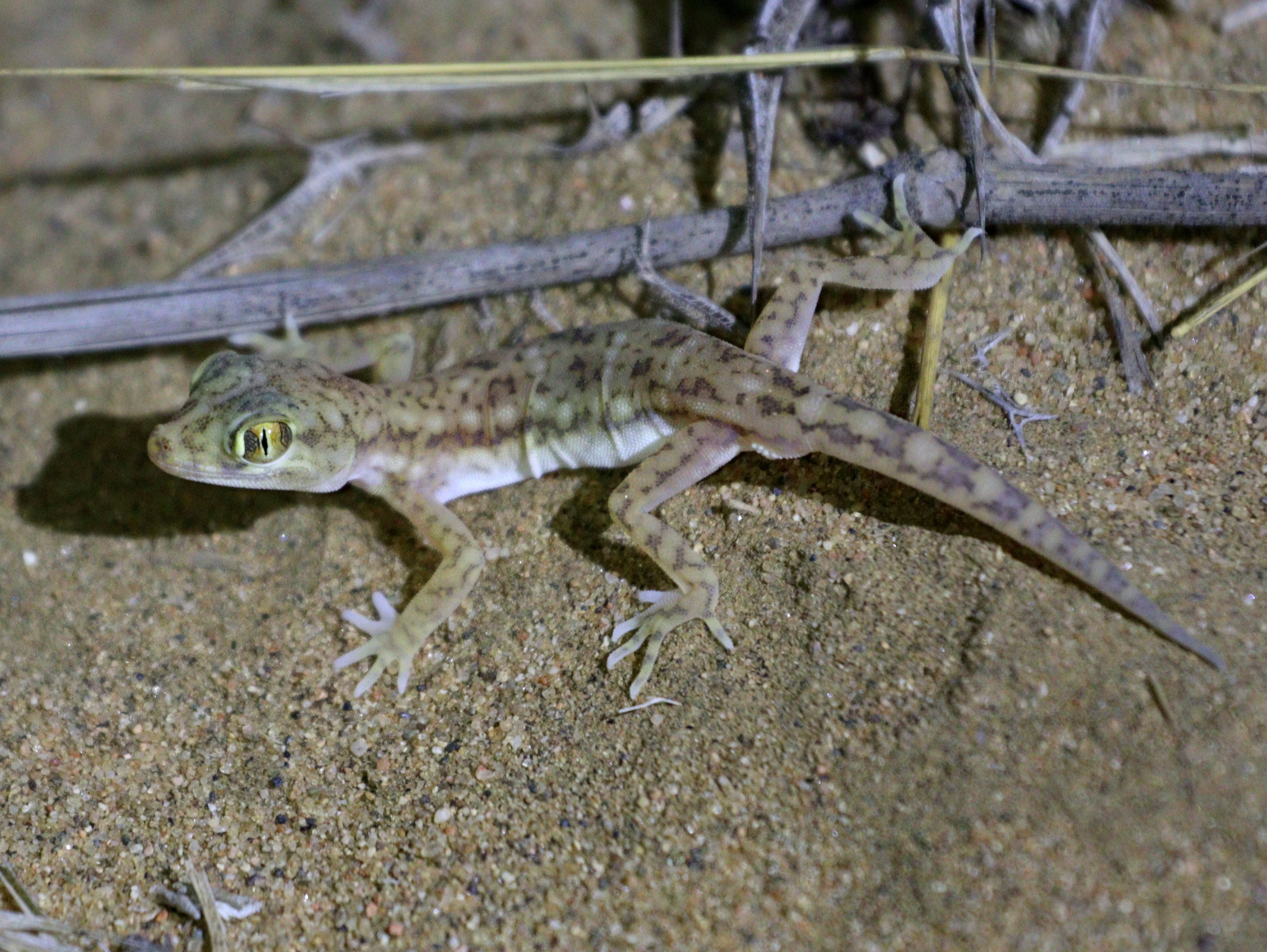

Conservation status
- Least Concern (IUCN 3.1)

Scientific classification
- Kingdom: Animalia
- Phylum: Chordata
- Class: Reptilia
- Order: Squamata
- Suborder: Gekkota
- Family: Gekkonidae
- Genus: Stenodactylus
- Species: S. yemenensis

Binomial name
- Stenodactylus yemenensis Arnold, 1980

= Yemen short-fingered gecko =

Species of lizard

The Yemen short-fingered gecko (Stenodactylus yemenensis) is a species of lizard in the family Gekkonidae. The species is found in Saudi Arabia and Yemen.
