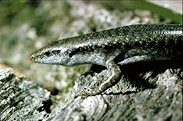

Conservation status
- Critically Endangered (IUCN 3.1)

- Endangered (ESA)

Scientific classification
- Kingdom: Animalia
- Phylum: Chordata
- Class: Reptilia
- Order: Squamata
- Family: Scincidae
- Genus: Emoia
- Species: E. slevini

Binomial name
- Emoia slevini W.C. Brown & Falanruw, 1972

= Emoia slevini =

Species of lizard

Emoia slevini, also known commonly as the Mariana skink, Slevin's brown skink, Slevin's emo skink, and Slevin's skink, is a species of lizard in the family Scincidae. The species is endemic to the Mariana Islands.

== Etymology ==
The specific name, slevini, is in honor of American herpetologist Joseph Richard Slevin.

== Habitat ==
The preferred natural habitat of E. slevini is forest, at altitudes from sea level to 400 m (1,300 ft).

== Description ==
E. slevini is a moderately large-sized species for its genus. Adults have a snout-to-vent length of 5.8–8.5 cm (2.3–3.3 in).

== Reproduction ==
E. slevini is oviparous.
