= Stenodactylus stenurus =

Scientific classification
- Kingdom: Animalia
- Phylum: Chordata
- Class: Reptilia
- Order: Squamata
- Suborder: Gekkota
- Family: Gekkonidae
- Genus: Stenodactylus
- Species: S. stenurus

Binomial name
- Stenodactylus stenurus Werner, 1899

Species of lizard

Stenodactylus stenurus is a species of lizard in the family Gekkonidae. The species is found in Northern Africa.
