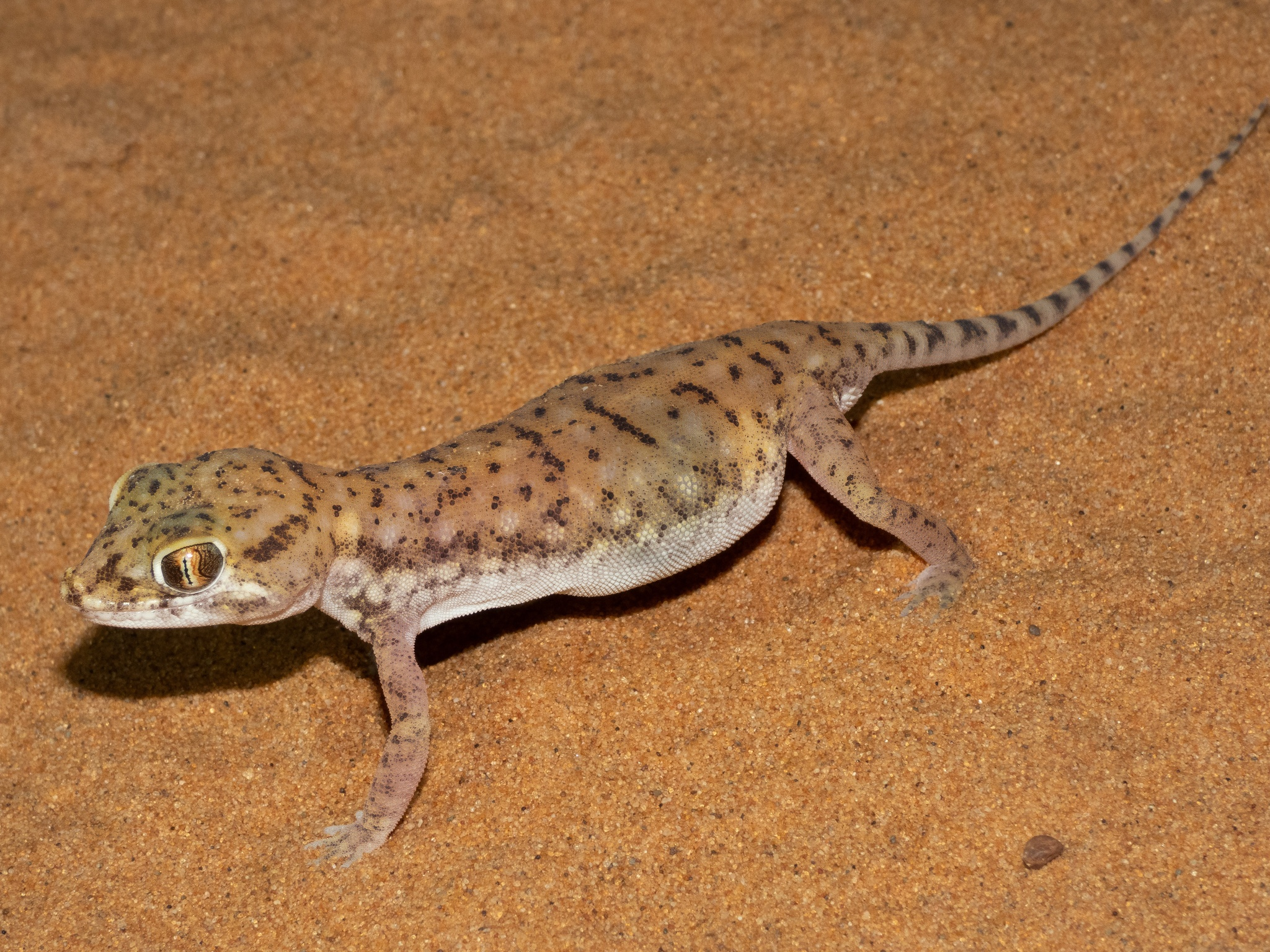
- In Morocco

Conservation status
- Least Concern (IUCN 3.1)

Scientific classification
- Kingdom: Animalia
- Phylum: Chordata
- Class: Reptilia
- Order: Squamata
- Suborder: Gekkota
- Family: Gekkonidae
- Genus: Stenodactylus
- Species: S. petrii

Binomial name
- Stenodactylus petrii J. Anderson, 1896

= Stenodactylus petrii =

Species of lizard

Stenodactylus petrii, known as the dune gecko, Anderson's short-fingered gecko, or Egyptian sand gecko, is a small, mostly nocturnal gecko of the genus Stenodactylus. It is not a frog-eyed gecko.

They are found across northern Africa and in Israel in arid regions. From head to base of tail, they are about 2–3 inches (5–8 cm) long, a very small dwarf gecko. The tails are quite long compared to their size, 1–2 inches (3–5 cm). If a tail is dropped, it will grow back, only shorter and stubbier. Unlike other geckos, dune geckos cannot climb up smooth surfaces. Instead, they prefer to dig. During the day, they usually hide in burrows or in caves, though often these are out and about in the day. They sometimes appear slow, but they can be extremely fast. Camouflage in the sand helps them remain inconspicuous, especially when hunting. They eat mainly crickets and mealworms. The dune gecko, if kept as a pet, should not be handled too often because it stresses them out and can cause severe health problems. Also they can be relatively social but are also known to live by themselves before mating.
