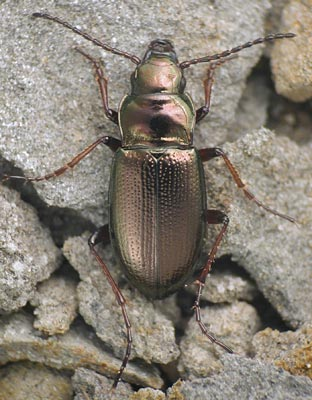
- Trachypachus slevini

Scientific classification
- Kingdom: Animalia
- Phylum: Arthropoda
- Class: Insecta
- Order: Coleoptera
- Suborder: Adephaga
- Family: Trachypachidae
- Genus: Trachypachus; Motschulsky, 1844

= Trachypachus =

Genus of beetles

Trachypachus is a genus of beetles in the family Trachypachidae that contains four described species. Below is a list of species:

- Trachypachus gibbsii
- Trachypachus holmbergi
- Trachypachus slevini
- Trachypachus zetterstedtii
