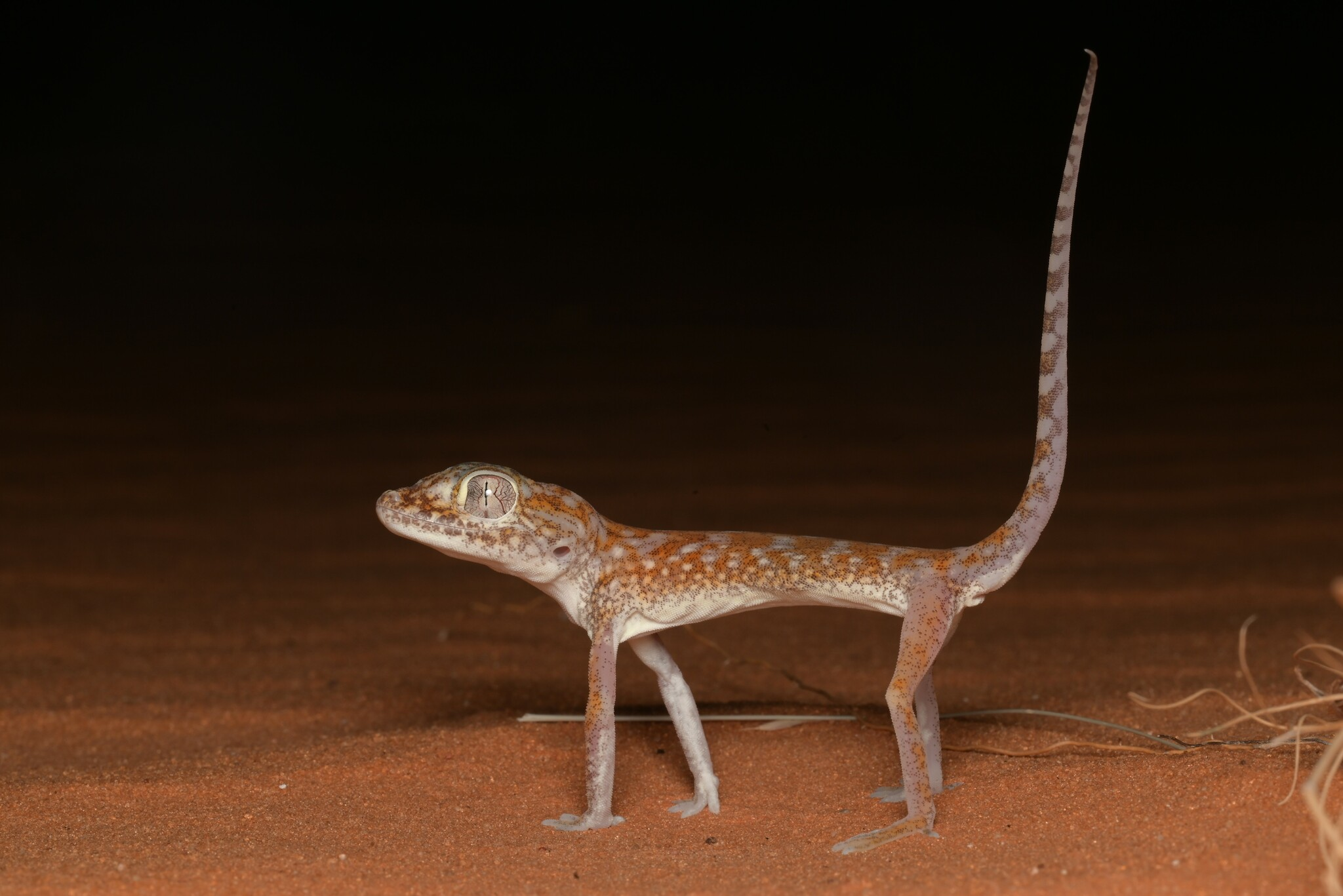
- Middle Eastern short-fingered gecko (Stenodactylus doriae)

Scientific classification
- Kingdom: Animalia
- Phylum: Chordata
- Class: Reptilia
- Order: Squamata
- Suborder: Gekkota
- Family: Gekkonidae
- Subfamily: Gekkoninae
- Genus: Stenodactylus; Fitzinger, 1826

= Stenodactylus =

Genus of lizards

Stenodactylus is a genus of Middle-Eastern and North-African geckos, commonly known as short-fingered geckos.

== Species ==
- Iranian short-fingered gecko, Stenodactylus affinis (Murray, 1884)
- Middle Eastern short-fingered gecko, Stenodactylus doriae (Blanford, 1874)
- Jordan short-fingered gecko, Stenodactylus grandiceps Haas, 1952
- Southern short-fingered gecko, Stenodactylus leptocosymbotes Leviton & Anderson, 1967
- Stenodactylus mauritanicus Guichenot, 1850
- Anderson's short-fingered gecko, Stenodactylus petrii Anderson, 1896
- Slevin's short-fingered gecko, Stenodactylus slevini Haas, 1957
- Stenodactylus stenurus Werner, 1899
- Lichtenstein's short-fingered gecko, Stenodactylus sthenodactylus (Lichtenstein, 1823)
- Yemen short-fingered gecko, Stenodactylus yemenensis Arnold, 1980
