= Systolosoma lateritium =

Scientific classification
- Kingdom: Animalia
- Phylum: Arthropoda
- Class: Insecta
- Order: Coleoptera
- Suborder: Adephaga
- Family: Trachypachidae
- Genus: Systolosoma
- Species: S. lateritium

Binomial name
- Systolosoma lateritium Nègre, 1973

Species of beetle

Systolosoma lateritium, the tiled neaustral false ground beetle, is a species of beetle in the genus Systolosoma. This species is found in Argentina, where they inhabit mid-altitude Valdivian temperate rainforests, as well as Coigue-Maniu forests, Coigue-Lenga forests, Lenga Beech forests and Nothofagus dombeyi/Nothofagus pumilio forests.

Adults have been observed taking cover in leaf litter.
