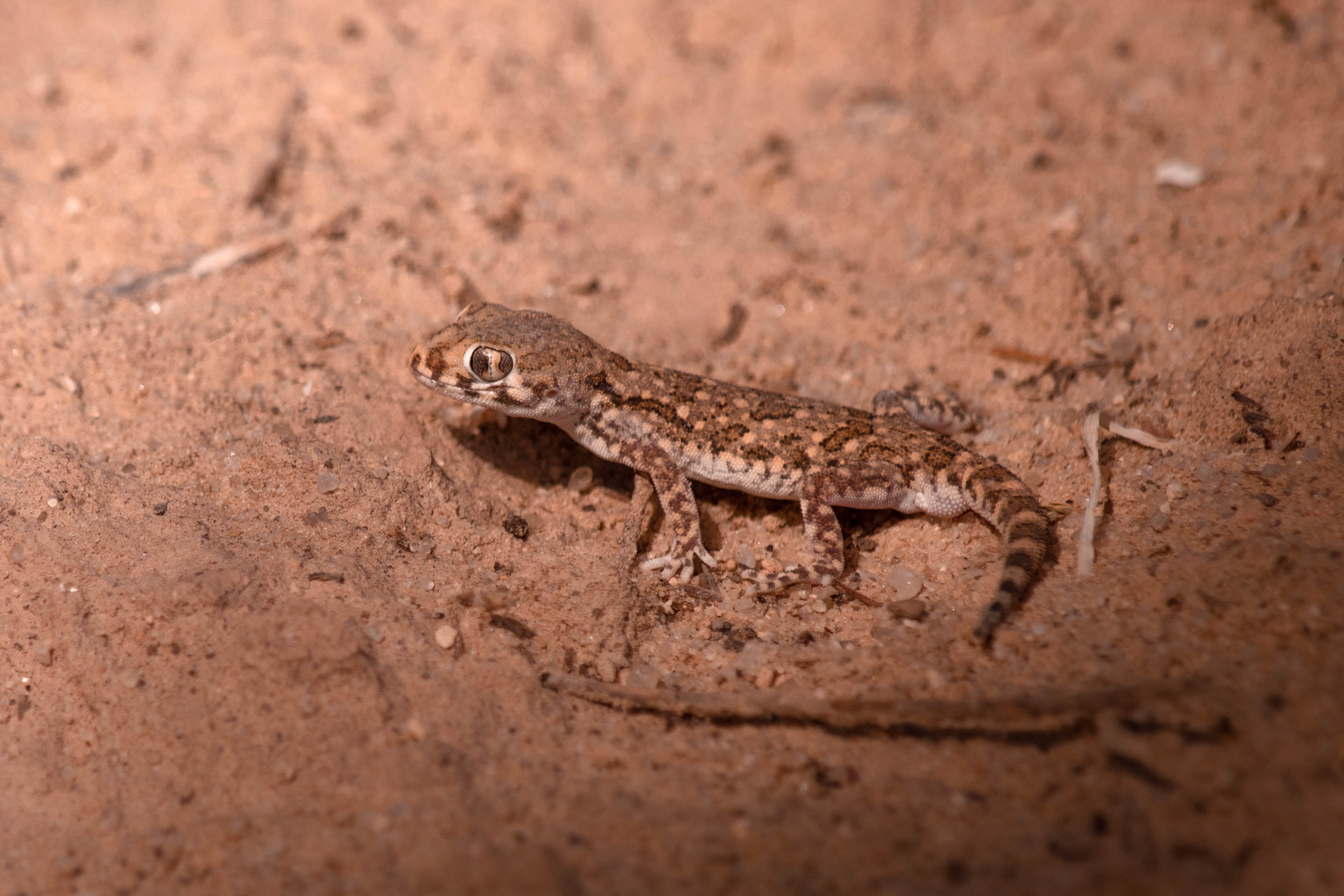
- Stenodactylus mauritanicus

Scientific classification
- Kingdom: Animalia
- Phylum: Chordata
- Class: Reptilia
- Order: Squamata
- Suborder: Gekkota
- Family: Gekkonidae
- Genus: Stenodactylus
- Species: S. mauritanicus

Binomial name
- Stenodactylus mauritanicus Guichenot, 1850

= Stenodactylus mauritanicus =

Species of lizard

Stenodactylus mauritanicus is a species of lizard in the family Gekkonidae. The species is found in Northern Africa.
