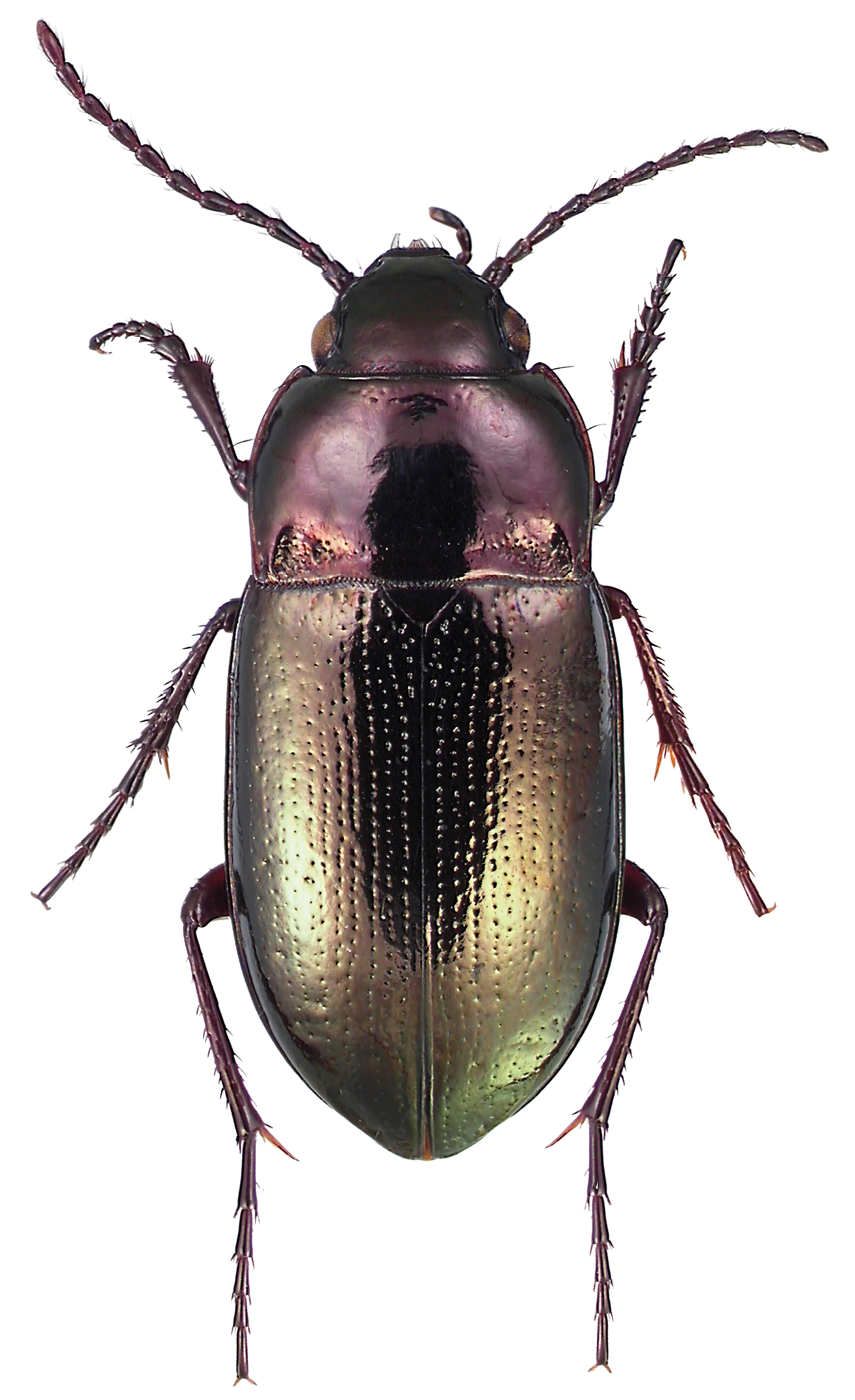

Scientific classification
- Kingdom: Animalia
- Phylum: Arthropoda
- Class: Insecta
- Order: Coleoptera
- Suborder: Adephaga
- Family: Trachypachidae
- Genus: Trachypachus
- Species: T. gibbsii

Binomial name
- Trachypachus gibbsii LeConte, 1861

Synonyms
- Trachypachus alticola Casey, 1920; Trachypachus californicus Motschulsky, 1864

= Trachypachus gibbsii =

Species of beetle

Trachypachus gibbsii, Gibbs’ temporal false ground beetle, is a species of false ground beetle in the family Trachypachidae. It is found in western North America, and Russia.

Adults are found on the banks of large rivers and small forested creeks. They can also be found under Populus balsamifera and pine/fir forests with similar soil conditions.
