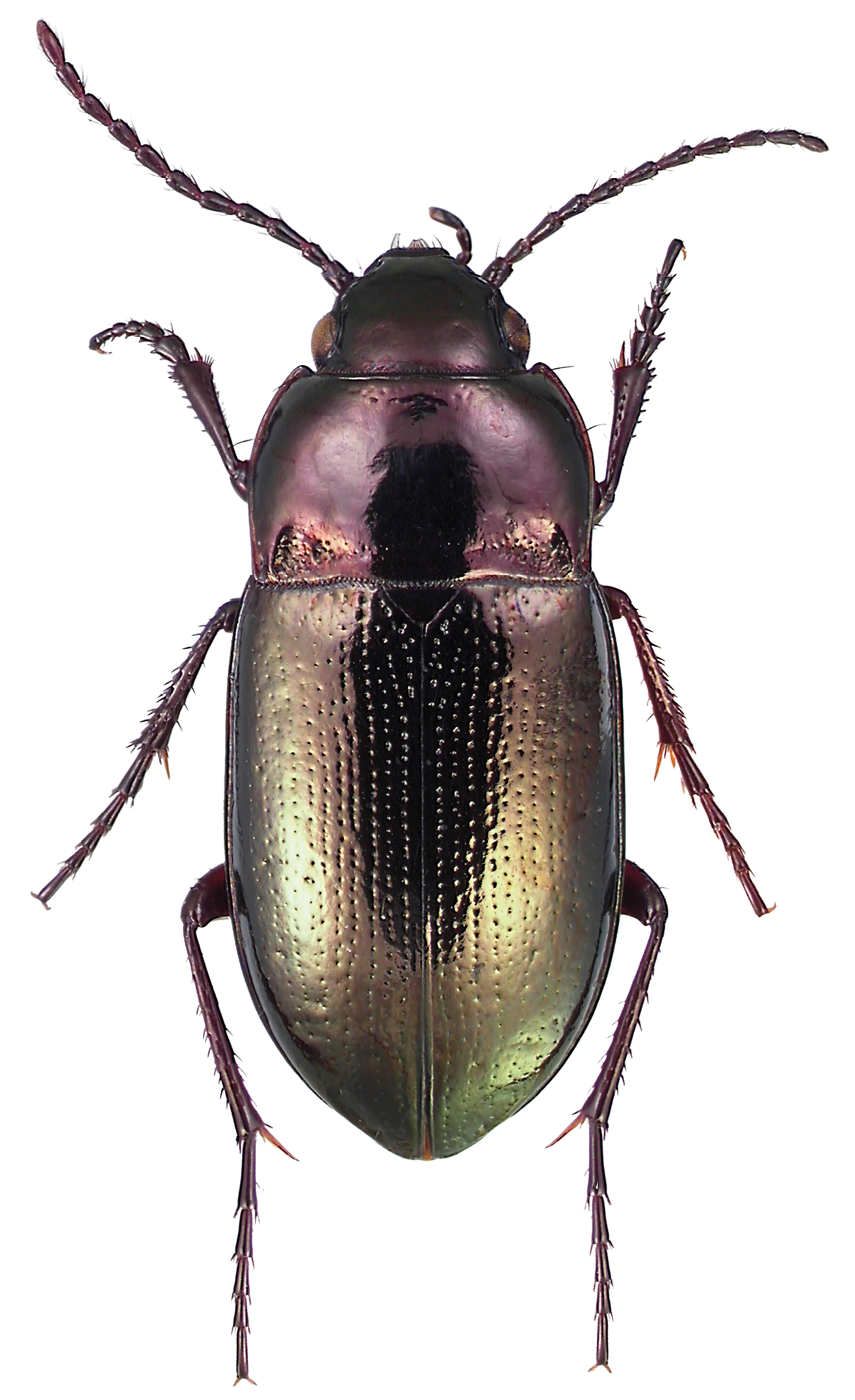
- Trachypachus gibbsii
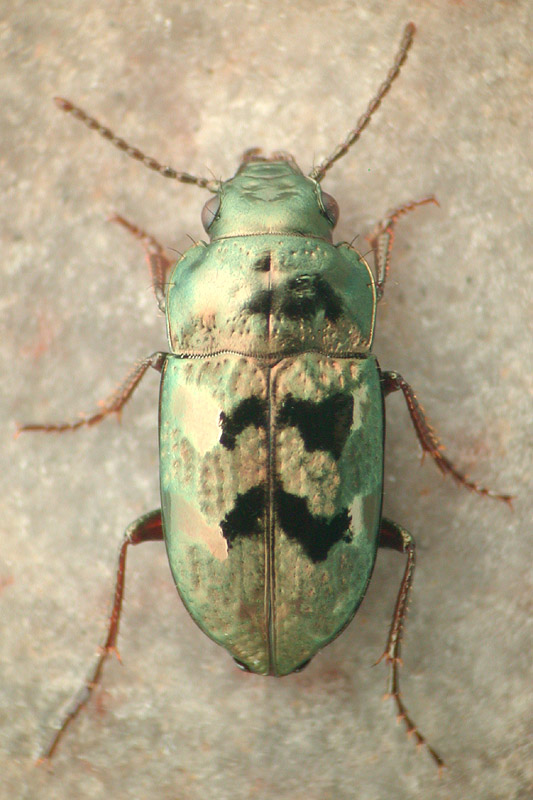
- Specimen of Systolosoma breve

Scientific classification
- Kingdom: Animalia
- Phylum: Arthropoda
- Clade: Pancrustacea
- Class: Insecta
- Order: Coleoptera
- Suborder: Adephaga
- Superfamily: Caraboidea
- Family: Trachypachidae; C. G. Thomson, 1857

Extant genera
- Systolosoma; Trachypachus; Fossil genera, see text

= Trachypachidae =

Trachypachidae Temporal range: Changhsingian–Present

Family of beetles

The Trachypachidae (sometimes known as false ground beetles) are a family of beetles that generally resemble small ground beetles, but that are distinguished by the large coxae of their rearmost legs. There are only six known extant species in the family, with four species of Trachypachus found in northern Eurasia and northern North America, and two species of Systolosoma in Chile and Argentina. They were originally more diverse, with dozens of species described in the Mesozoic.

Their habits are similar to those of the ground beetles; they are usually found in the leaf litter of conifer forests, and are thought to be mostly predators and scavengers, active during the day (diurnal).

According to entomologist George Ball, "the most interesting thing about this small family is its uncertain phylogenetic relationships"; it has previously been classified as a subfamily of Carabidae, and as a family has been placed in several different positions relative to other beetle families. Recent molecular phylogenies have recovered as the sister group to the clade Carabidae+Cicindelidae as part of the Adephaga subgroup Geadephaga. The earliest fossils known of this family are of the genera Petrodromeus, Permunda and Apermunda from the Permian-Triassic boundary of Russia around 252 million years ago. Fossil genera of the family are classified in the subfamily Eodromeinae, while the two modern genera are placed in the subfamily Trachypachinae. The two subfamilies are distinguished by the shape and position of the sclerites that are jointed to the mesocoxae (the section where the middle pair of legs joins the body).

== Species ==
- Subfamily Trachypachinae
  - Systolosoma Chile, Argentina
    - Systolosoma breve
    - Systolosoma lateritium
  - Trachypachus Holarctic
    - Trachypachus holmbergi
    - Trachypachus gibbsii
    - Trachypachus zetterstedtii
    - Trachypachus slevini
- Subfamily †Eodromeinae
- After revision in Kirejtshuk et Ansorge, 2022.
  - †Coreoeicos Bode, 1953 Posidonia Shale, Germany Early Jurassic (Toarcian)
  - †Denudirabus Ren, 1995 China, Early Cretaceous (Aptian)
  - †Dolichorabus Ponomarenko, 1985 Ichetuy Formation, Russia, Late Jurassic
  - †Dundorabus Ponomarenko, 1989 Ulaan-Ereg Formation Mongolia, Late Jurassic (Tithonian)
  - †Eodromeites Ponomarenko, 1985 (2 species) Russia, Upper Jurassic
  - †Eodromeus Ponomarenko, 1977 (10+ species) China Russia Mongolia, Middle Jurassic-Early Cretaceous
  - †Liassodites Kirejtshuk et Ansorge, 2022 Green Series, Germany Early Jurassic (Toarcian)
  - †Evertus Ponomarenko, 1986 (= Fortiseode Jia, Liang, Chang et Ren, 2011) (3 species) Mongolia, Yixian Formation, China, Early Cretaceous (Aptian)
  - †Karadromeus Ponomarenko, 1977 (6+ species) Kazakhstan, Mongolia, Russia, China?, Middle Jurassic-Early Cretaceous
  - †Karatoma Ponomarenko, 1977 (2 species) Karabastau Formation Kazakhstan, Middle-Late Jurassic, Glushkovo Formation, Russia, Upper Jurassic (Tithonian)
  - †Necronectulus Ponomarenko, 1977 Tologoi Formation, Kazakhstan, Upper Triassic (Carnian-Norian) Jinju Formation, South Korea Early Cretaceous (Albian)
  - †Novunda Kirejtshuk et Ansorge, 2022 (= Unda Ponomarenko, 1977 preoccupied genus) (5 species) Daohugou, China, Middle Jurassic, Glushkovo Formation, Russia, Upper Jurassic
  - †Platycoxa Ponomarenko, 1977 Kyrgyzstan, Lower Jurassic
  - †Prosynactus Bode, 1953 Posidonia Shale, Germany Early Jurassic (Toarcian)
  - †Psacodromeus Ponomarenko, 1977 Kazakhstan, Mongolia, Middle/Late Jurassic-Early Cretaceous, Jinju Formation, South Korea Early Cretaceous (Albian)
  - †Sinodromeus Wang, Zhang et Ponomarenko, 2012, Yixian Formation, China, Early Cretaceous (Aptian)
  - †Sogdodromeus Ponomarenko, 1977 Madygen Formation, Kyrgyzstan, Upper Triassic (Carnian)
    - †Sogdodromeus altus
  - †Xishanocarabus Hong, 1984 Lushangfen Formation, China, Early Cretaceous (Aptian)
  - †Petrodromeus Ponomarenko et Volkov, 2013 Kemerovo, Russia, Late Permian (Changhsingian)
    - †Petrodromeus asiaticus (=Ademosynoides asiaticus; Martynov, 1936)
  - †Apermunda Kirejtshuk et Ansorge, 2022, Kemerovo, Russia, Late Permian (Changhsingian)
    - †Apermunda minor (=Petrodromeus minor)
  - †Permunda Ponomarenko et Volkov, 2013 Kemerovo, Russia, Late Permian (Changhsingian)
    - †Permunda nana
