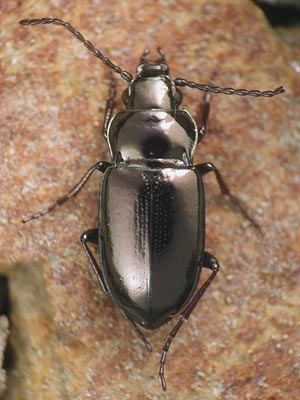

Scientific classification
- Kingdom: Animalia
- Phylum: Arthropoda
- Class: Insecta
- Order: Coleoptera
- Suborder: Adephaga
- Family: Trachypachidae
- Genus: Trachypachus
- Species: T. holmbergi

Binomial name
- Trachypachus holmbergi Mannerheim, 1853

Synonyms
- Trachypachus inermis Motschulsky, 1850; Trachypachus oregonus Casey, 1920; Trachypachus specularis Casey, 1920

= Trachypachus holmbergi =

Species of beetle

Trachypachus holmbergi, Holmberg’s temporal false ground beetle, is a species of beetle in the family Trachypachidae. This species is found in the United States and Canada, where it is found from lowlands to mountains.

Adults may be found among dead leaves, often on open or slightly shaded ground with sparse vegetation.
