= Eastern sand gecko =

Conservation status
- Least Concern (IUCN 3.1)

Scientific classification
- Kingdom: Animalia
- Phylum: Chordata
- Class: Reptilia
- Order: Squamata
- Suborder: Gekkota
- Family: Gekkonidae
- Genus: Stenodactylus
- Species: S. leptocosymbotes

Binomial name
- Stenodactylus leptocosymbotes Leviton & Anderson, 1967

Species of lizard

The eastern sand gecko (Stenodactylus leptocosymbotes) is a species of lizard in the family Gekkonidae. The species is found in the Middle East.
