= Slevin's worm lizard =

Conservation status
- Least Concern (IUCN 3.1)

Scientific classification
- Kingdom: Animalia
- Phylum: Chordata
- Class: Reptilia
- Order: Squamata
- Clade: Amphisbaenia
- Family: Amphisbaenidae
- Genus: Amphisbaena
- Species: A. slevini

Binomial name
- Amphisbaena slevini Schmidt, 1936
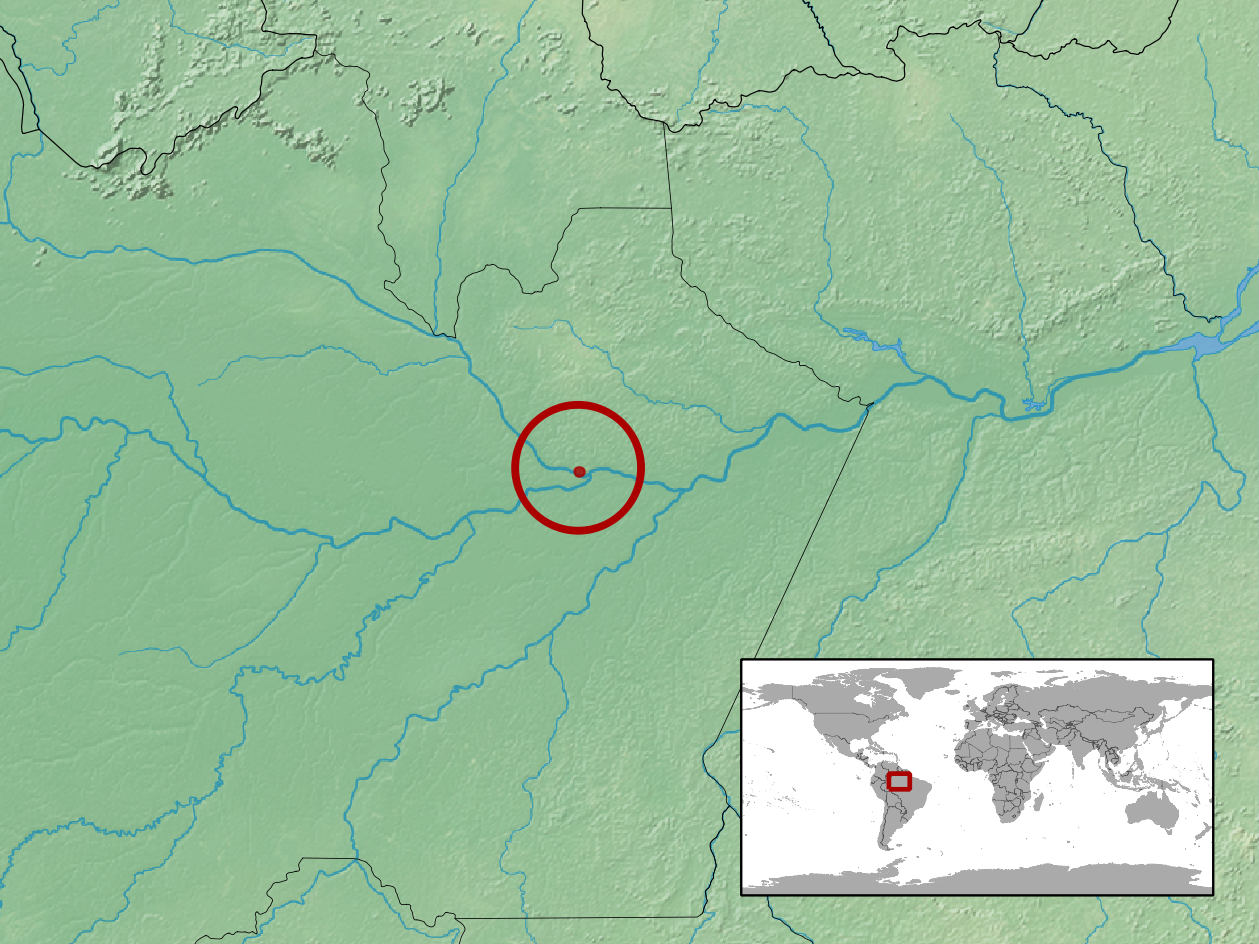

Species of lizard

Slevin's worm lizard (Amphisbaena slevini) is a species of amphisbaenian in the family Amphisbaenidae. The species is endemic to northern South America.

== Etymology ==
The specific name, slevini, is in honor of American herpetologist Joseph Richard Slevin.

== Geographic range ==
A. sleveni is found in Brazil (Amazonas state) and French Guiana.

== Habitat ==
The preferred habitat of A. slevini is forest.

== Description ==
A. slevini is a uniform light brownish color. Adults have a snout-to-vent length (SVL) of about 10–11 cm (3.9–4.3 in), and a tail length of about 1.5 cm (0.59 in).

== Reproduction ==
A. slevini is oviparous.
