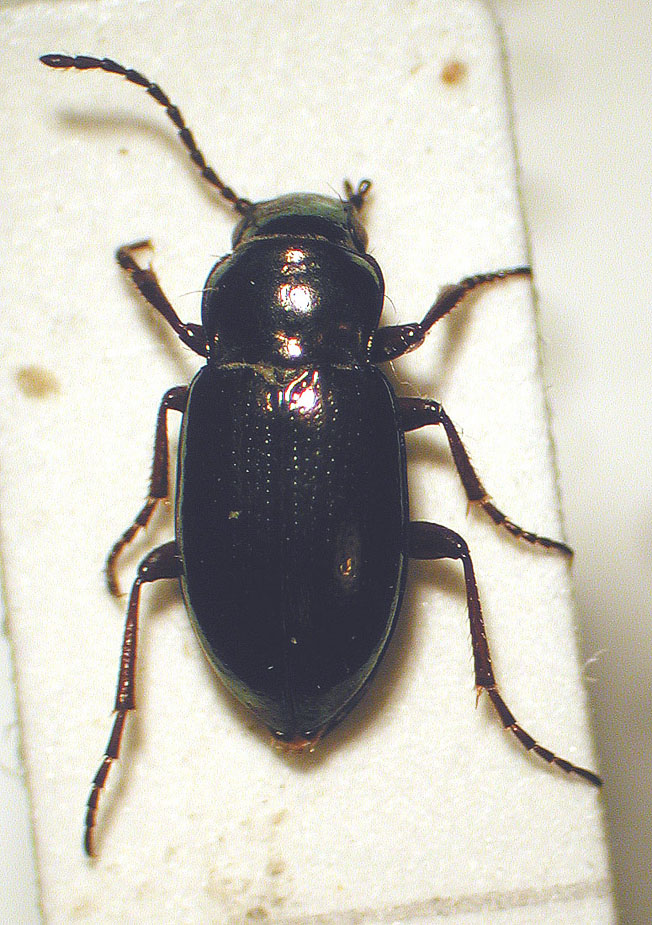

Scientific classification
- Kingdom: Animalia
- Phylum: Arthropoda
- Class: Insecta
- Order: Coleoptera
- Suborder: Adephaga
- Family: Trachypachidae
- Genus: Trachypachus
- Species: T. zetterstedtii

Binomial name
- Trachypachus zetterstedtii (Gyllenhal, 1827)

Synonyms
- Blethisa zetterstedtii Gyllenhal, 1827; Trachypachus laticollis Motschulsky, 1864; Trachypachus transversicollis Motschulsky, 1844

= Trachypachus zetterstedtii =

Species of beetle

Trachypachus zetterstedtii is a species of beetle of the Trachypachidae family. This species is found in Norway, Sweden, Finland, Estonia, Latvia, China, North Korea and Russia.
