= Eodromeus =

Eodromeus Temporal range: Callovian–Aptian

Scientific classification
- Domain: Eukaryota
- Kingdom: Animalia
- Phylum: Arthropoda
- Class: Insecta
- Order: Coleoptera
- Suborder: Adephaga
- Family: Trachypachidae
- Genus: †Eodromeus; Ponomarenko, 1977

Extinct genus of beetles

Eodromeus is an extinct genus of false ground beetle in the family Trachypachidae. There are about nine described species in Eodromeus.

== Species ==
These nine species belong to the genus Eodromeus:

- † Eodromeus antiquus Ponomarenko, 1977
- † Eodromeus daohugouensis Wang & Zhang&Ponomarenko, 2012
- † Eodromeus dissectus Ponomarenko, 1977
- † Eodromeus major Ponomarenko, 1977
- † Eodromeus mongolicus Ponomarenko, 1989
- † Eodromeus robustus Wang & Zhang&Ponomarenko, 2012
- † Eodromeus sternalis Ponomarenko, 1977
- † Eodromeus sulcatus Ponomarenko, 1989
- † Eodromeus viriosus Zhang, 1997
