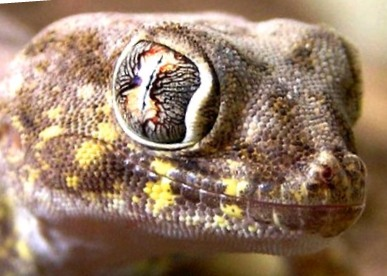

Conservation status
- Least Concern (IUCN 3.1)

Scientific classification
- Kingdom: Animalia
- Phylum: Chordata
- Class: Reptilia
- Order: Squamata
- Suborder: Gekkota
- Family: Gekkonidae
- Genus: Stenodactylus
- Species: S. affinis

Binomial name
- Stenodactylus affinis (Murray, 1884)
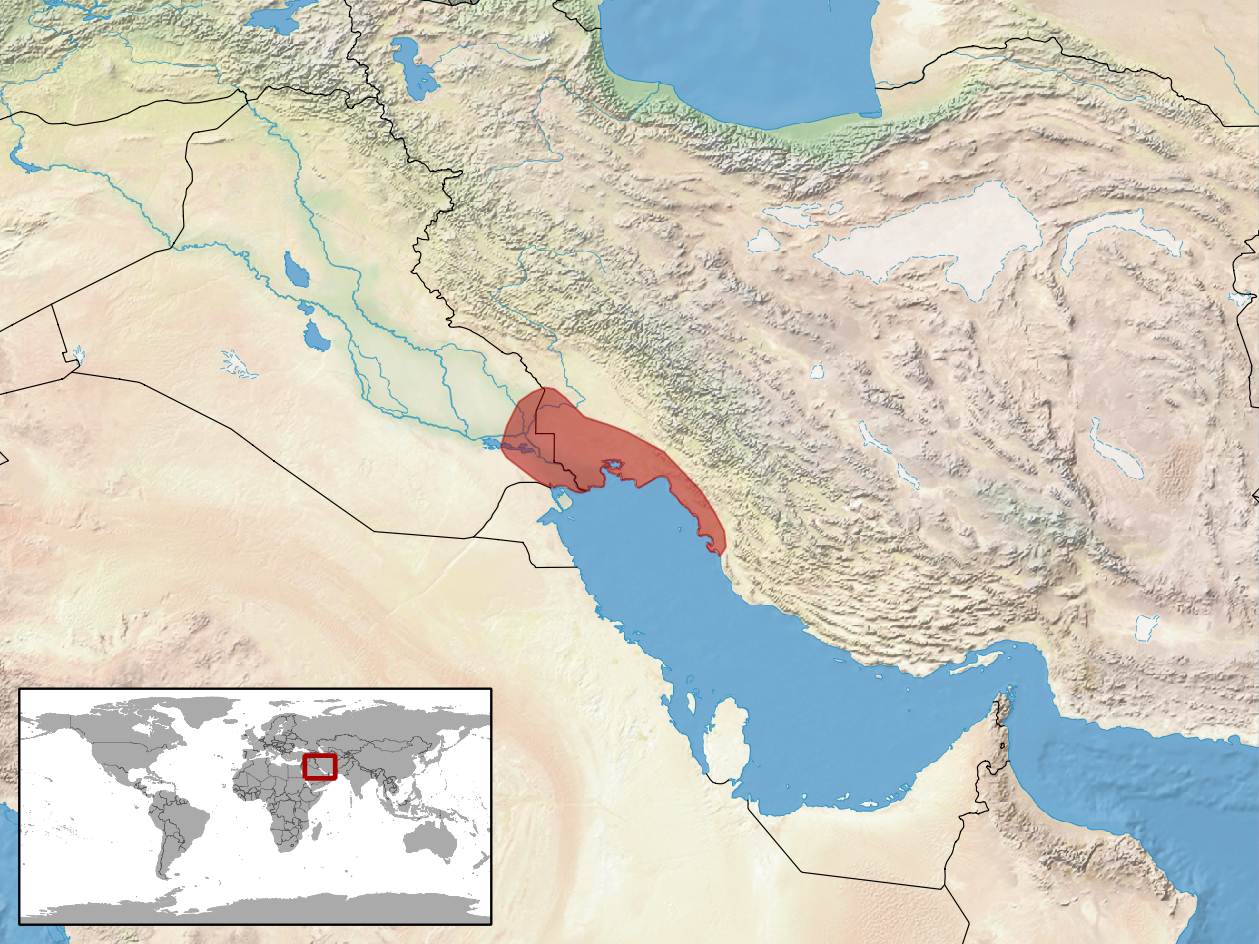

= Stenodactylus affinis =

Species of lizard

Stenodactylus affinis, also known as the Iranian short-fingered gecko or Murray's comb-fingered gecko, is a species of gecko. It is found in Iran's southeastern Khuzestan province and southern Fars province), Iraq.

== Size ==
Medium-sized, up to in minimum 60 mm from snout to anus.
