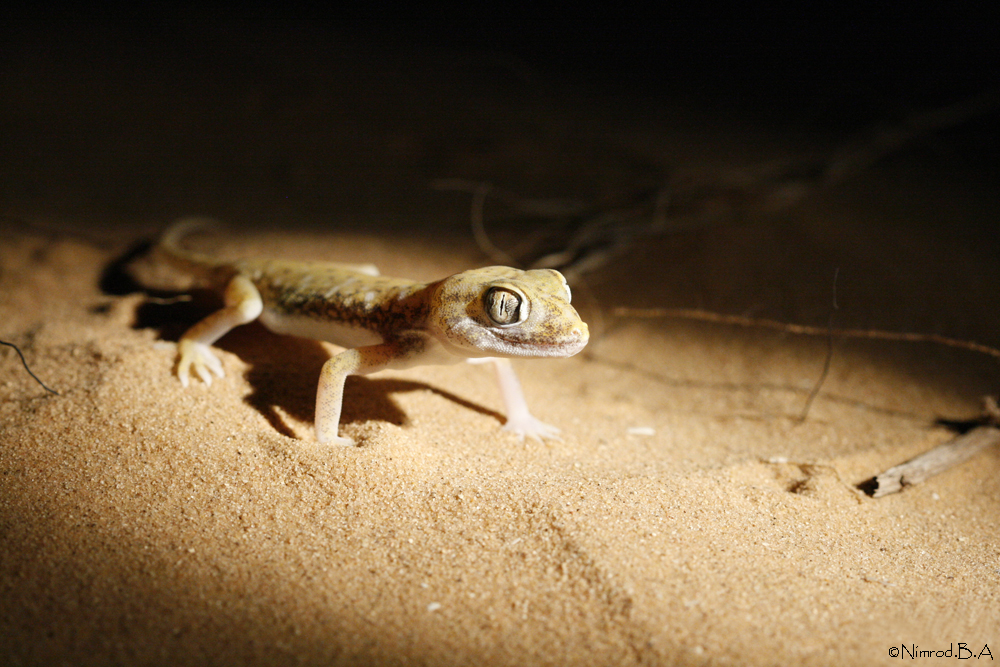

Conservation status
- Least Concern (IUCN 3.1)

Scientific classification
- Kingdom: Animalia
- Phylum: Chordata
- Class: Reptilia
- Order: Squamata
- Suborder: Gekkota
- Family: Gekkonidae
- Genus: Stenodactylus
- Species: S. sthenodactylus

Binomial name
- Stenodactylus sthenodactylus (Lichtenstein, 1823)

= Stenodactylus sthenodactylus =

Species of lizard

Stenodactylus sthenodactylus, also known as the Lichtenstein's short-fingered gecko or elegant gecko, is a species of lizard in the family Gekkonidae. The species is found in the Middle East (Israel, Jordan, Egypt, Syria, and Saudi Arabia), throughout North Africa, marginally in West Africa (Mali), and in northern East Africa (Sudan, South Sudan, Djibouti, Eritrea, Kenya, and Ethiopia). It is widespread and common but not abundant and is associated with semi-arid to hyperarid areas.

== Taxonomy ==
It was first described by Hinrich Lichtenstein in 1823, with its original name being Ascalabotes sthenodactylus. This naming was established by Lichtenstein in the catalogue of duplicate specimens from the collections of the Zoological Museum of Berlin (now Museum für Naturkunde) based on specimens collected by Friedrich Wilhelm Hemprich and Christian Gottfried Ehrenberg in Egypt and Nubia.
