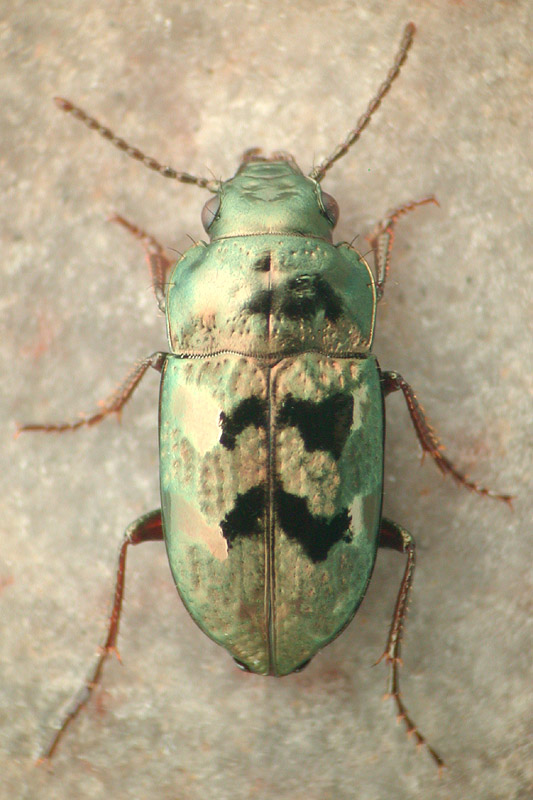

Scientific classification
- Kingdom: Animalia
- Phylum: Arthropoda
- Class: Insecta
- Order: Coleoptera
- Suborder: Adephaga
- Superfamily: Caraboidea
- Family: Trachypachidae
- Genus: Systolosoma
- Species: S. breve

Binomial name
- Systolosoma breve Solier, 1849

Synonyms
- Notioxenus bilunulatus Motschulsky, 1857

= Systolosoma breve =

Species of beetle

Systolosoma breve, the short neaustral false ground beetle, is a species of beetle in the genus Systolosoma. They have been found in Argentina and Chile, where they inhabit lowlands to midlands in Valdivian rainforests with Nothofagus dombeyi and Araucaria araucana, as well as Coigue Maniu Forest and Nire/Steppe.

They can be found on sandy alluvium and open sandy areas, as well as amongst forest leaf and wood litter. Adults have been observed taking cover in leaf litter.
