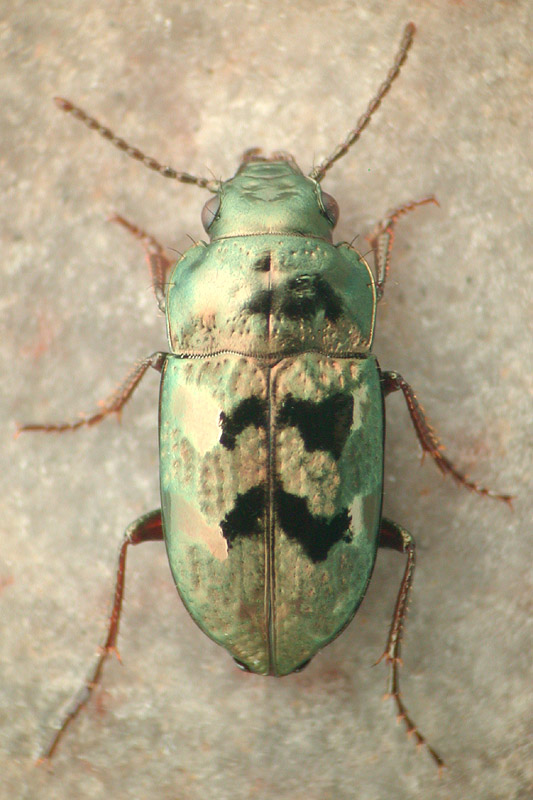
- Systolosoma breve

Scientific classification
- Domain: Eukaryota
- Kingdom: Animalia
- Phylum: Arthropoda
- Class: Insecta
- Order: Coleoptera
- Suborder: Adephaga
- Family: Trachypachidae
- Genus: Systolosoma; Solier, 1849

Type species
- Systolosoma breve Solier, 1849

= Systolosoma =

Genus of beetles

Systolosoma is a genus of beetles and one of two extant genera in the family Trachypachidae, containing two species, Systolosoma breve and Systolosoma lateritium, which are endemic to Chile and Argentina
