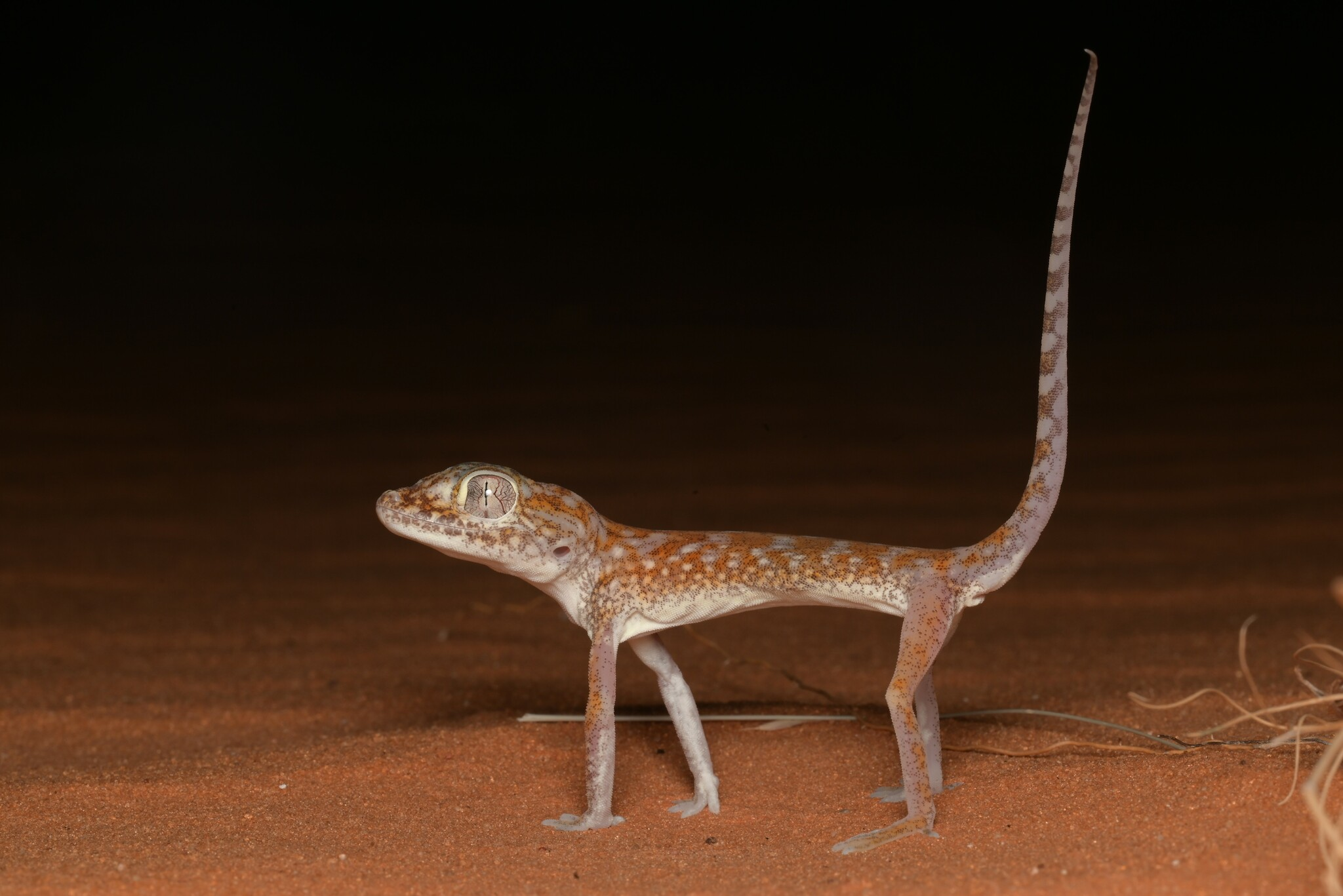

Conservation status
- Least Concern (IUCN 3.1)

Scientific classification
- Kingdom: Animalia
- Phylum: Chordata
- Class: Reptilia
- Order: Squamata
- Suborder: Gekkota
- Family: Gekkonidae
- Genus: Stenodactylus
- Species: S. doriae

Binomial name
- Stenodactylus doriae (Blanford, 1874)

Synonyms
- Ceramodactylus doriae Blanford, 1874; Stenodactylus doriae — J. Anderson, 1896

= Stenodactylus doriae =

Species of lizard

Stenodactylus doriae, commonly known as Doria's comb-fingered gecko and the Middle Eastern short-fingered gecko, is a species of lizard in the family Gekkonidae. The species is native to Western Asia.

== Etymology ==
The specific name, doriae, is in honor of Italian naturalist Giacomo Doria.

== Geographic range ==
S. doriae occurs in Iran, Iraq, Israel, Jordan, Kuwait, Oman, Saudi Arabia, and the United Arab Emirates.

== Habitat ==
The preferred natural habitat of S. doriae is desert, at altitudes from sea level to 1,000 m (3,300 ft).

== Description ==
S. doraiae reaches a snout-to-vent length (SVL) of about 8.3 cm (3.3 in). Its eyes are bordered by large scales to protect them from the sand during burrowing.

== Reproduction ==
S. doriae is oviparous. Clutch size is one or two eggs.

== Gallery ==
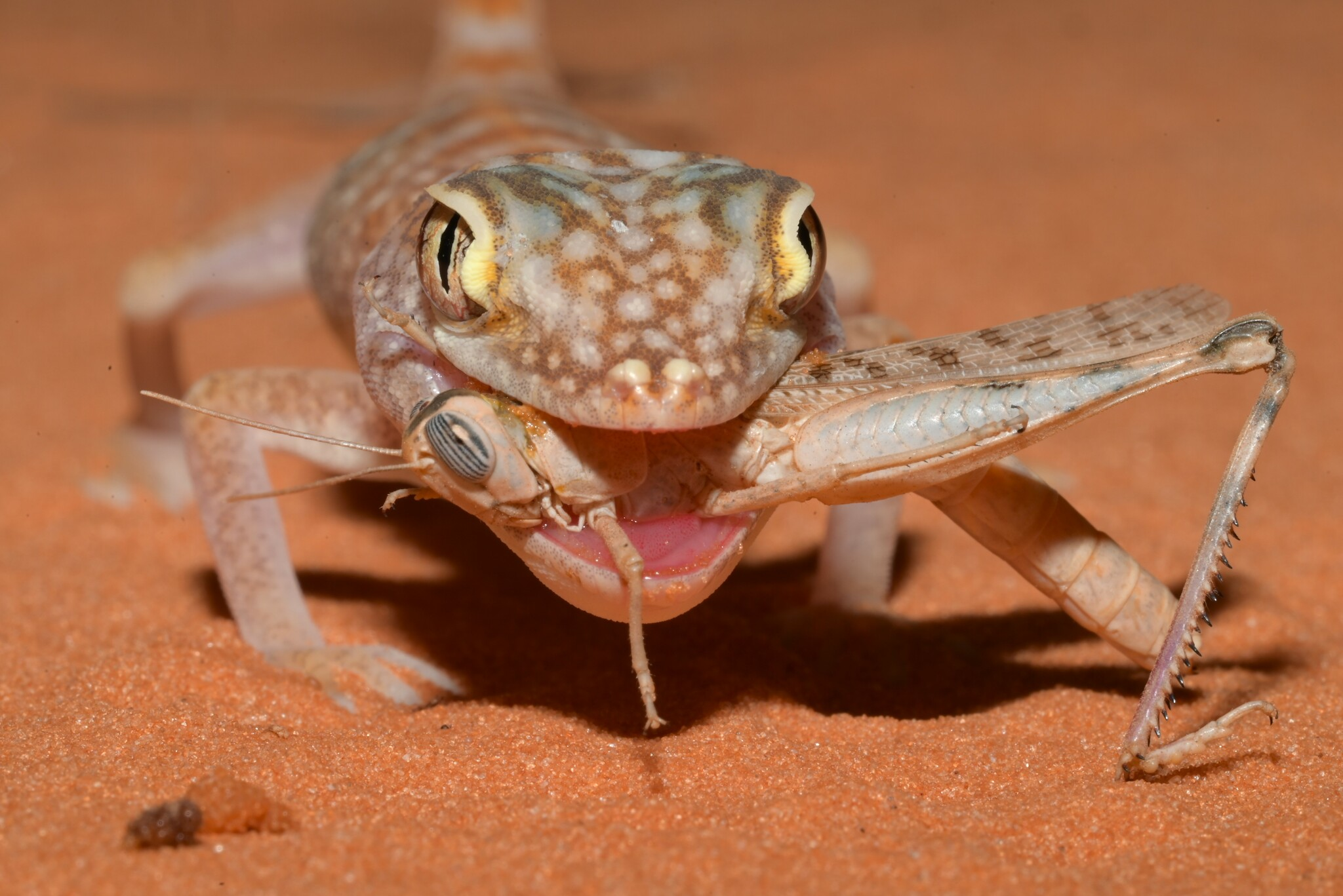
Eating a grasshopper

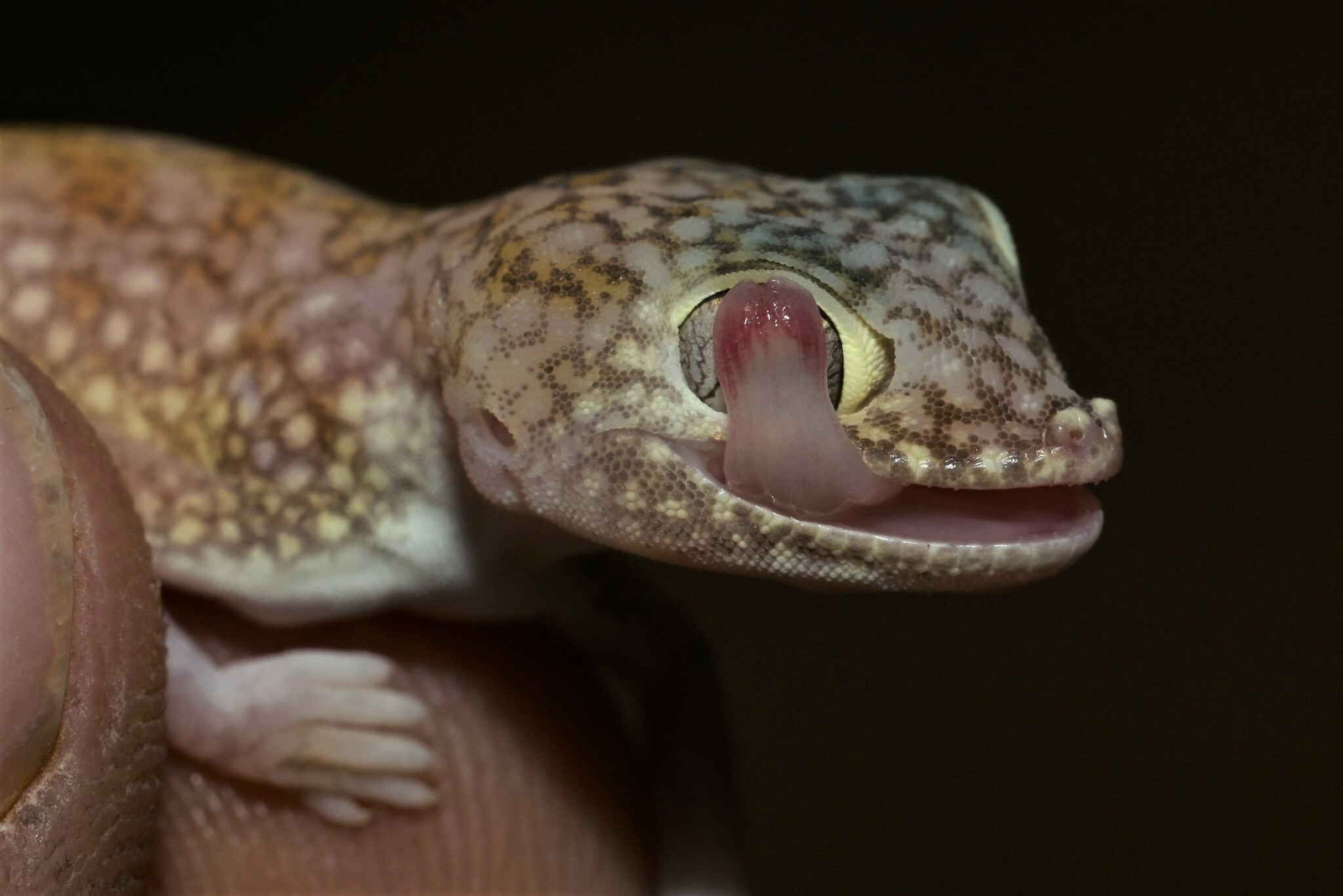
Licking eye

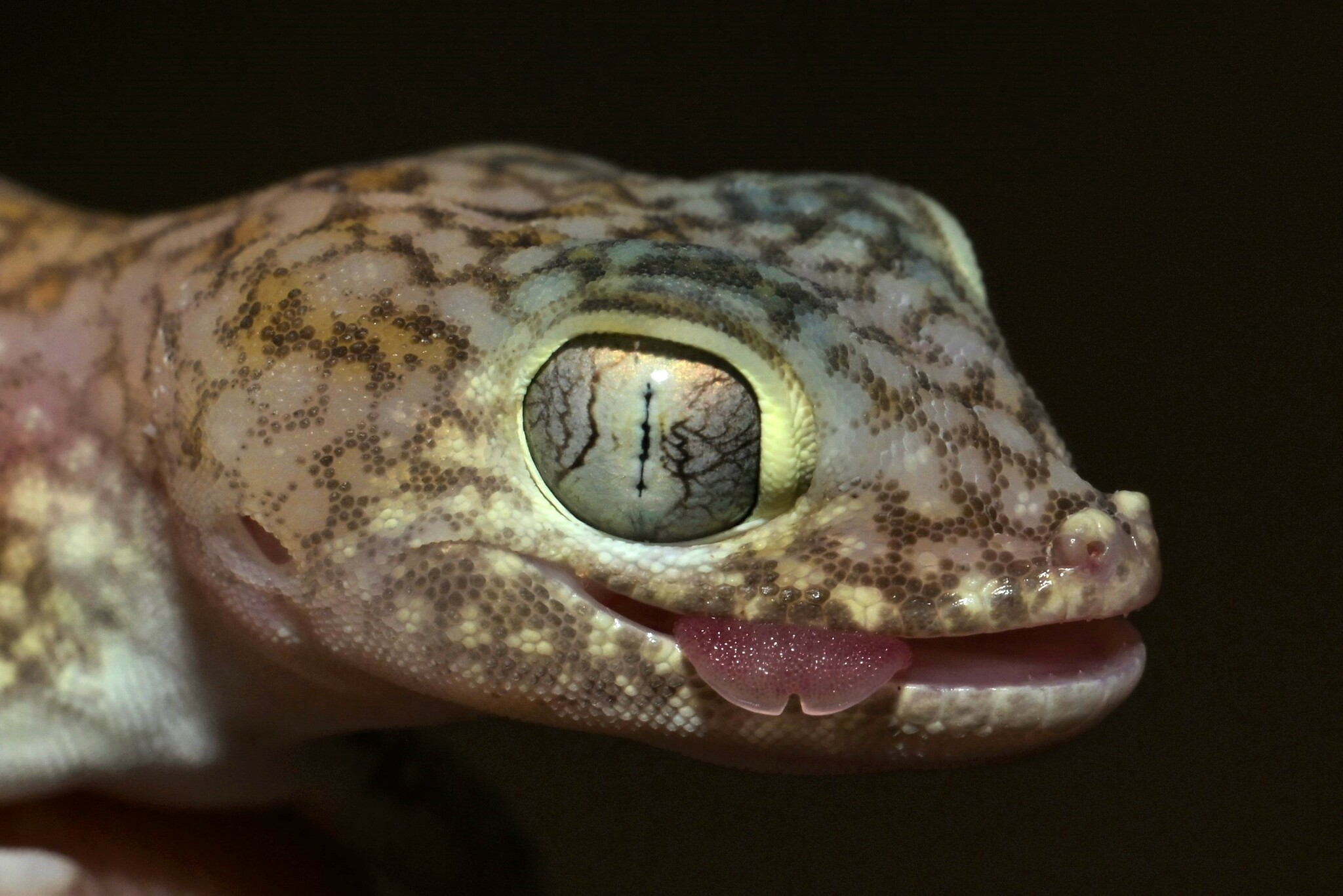
With constricted pupils

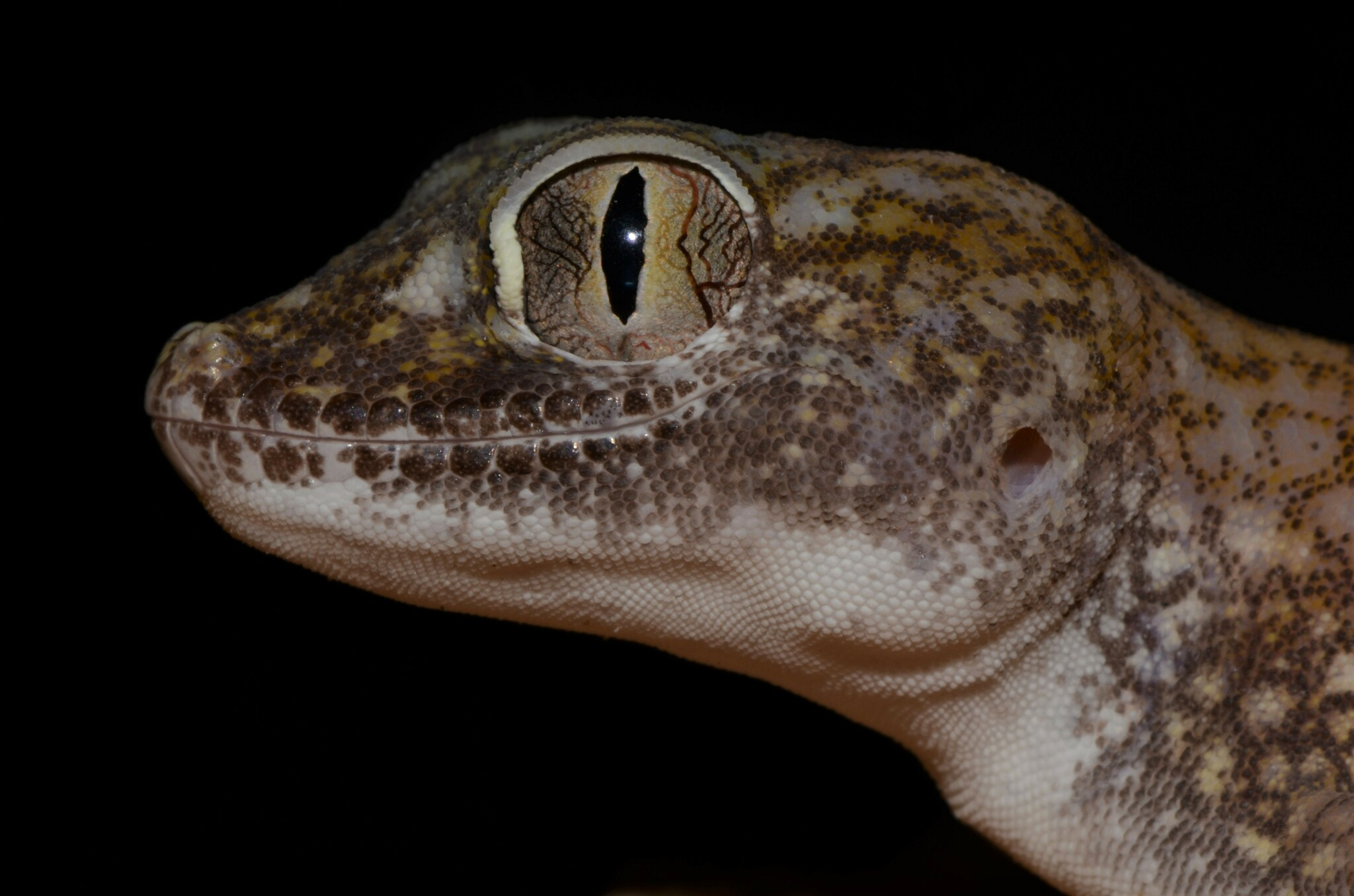
With dilated pupils
