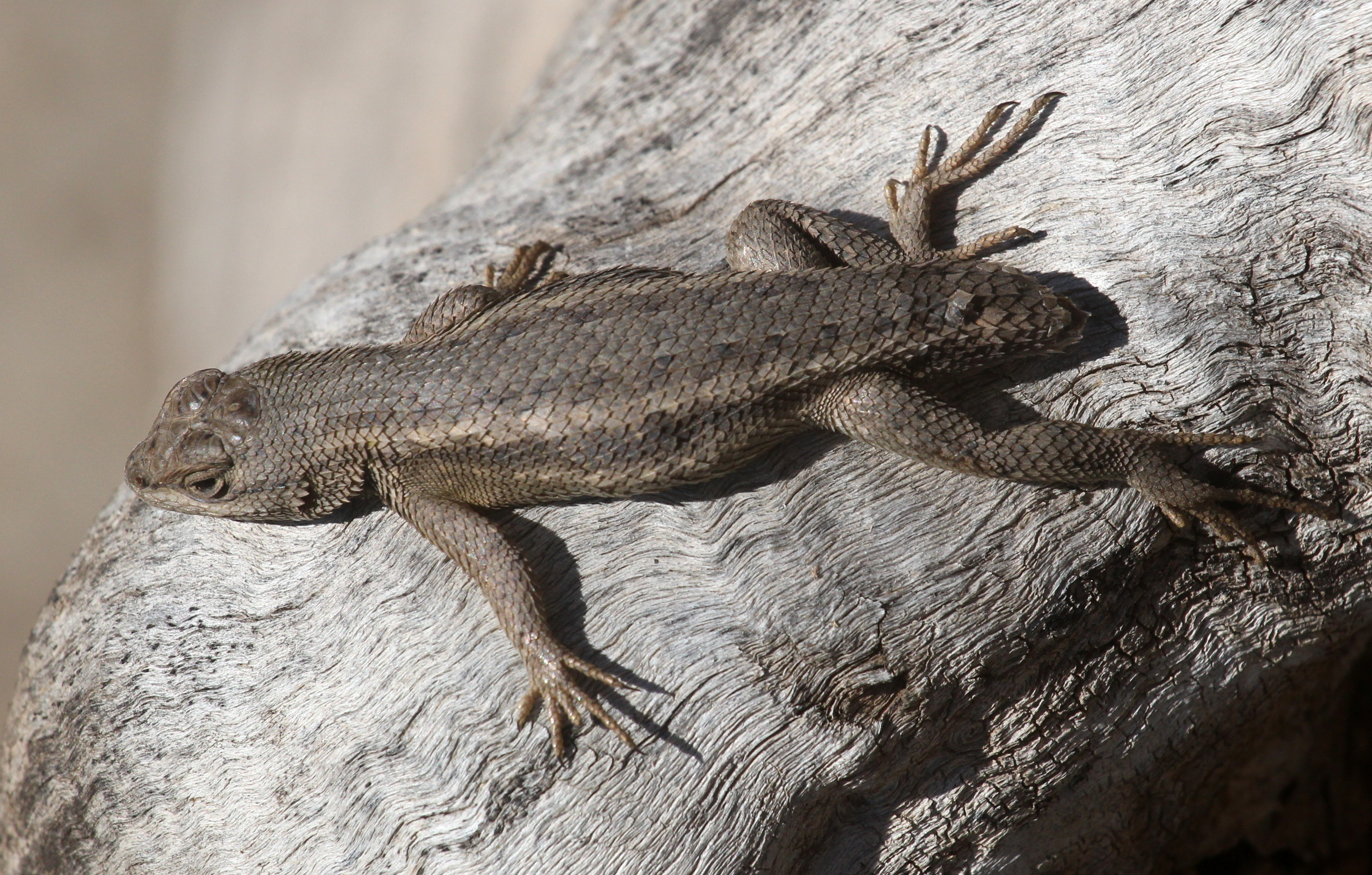

Conservation status
- Least Concern (IUCN 3.1)

Scientific classification
- Kingdom: Animalia
- Phylum: Chordata
- Class: Reptilia
- Order: Squamata
- Suborder: Iguania
- Family: Phrynosomatidae
- Genus: Sceloporus
- Species: S. slevini

Binomial name
- Sceloporus slevini H.M. Smith, 1937

Synonyms
- Sceloporus scalaris slevini H.M. Smith, 1937; Sceloporus slevini — W. Tanner, 1987

= Slevin's bunchgrass lizard =

Species of lizard

Slevin's bunchgrass lizard (Sceloporus slevini) is a species of lizard in the family Phrynosomatidae. The species is indigenous to the southwestern United States and adjacent northern Mexico.

== Taxonomy and etymology ==
Described in 1937 by Hobart M. Smith, the species was named after the collector of the holotype specimen, Joseph R. Slevin.

== Geographic range ==
In the United States, S. slevini is found in southeastern Arizona. In Mexico, it is found in Chihuahua, northern Durango, northeastern Sinaloa, and eastern Sonora.

== Habitat ==
The preferred natural habitats of S. slevini are grassland and forest.

== Description ==
Adults of S. slevinii have a snout-to-vent length (SVL) of 4–7 cm (1.6–2.8 in). The rows of lateral scales on the sides of the body are parallel to the rows of dorsal scales. The rows of femoral pores are separated at the midline by not more than two scales.

== Reproduction ==
S. slevini is oviparous.
