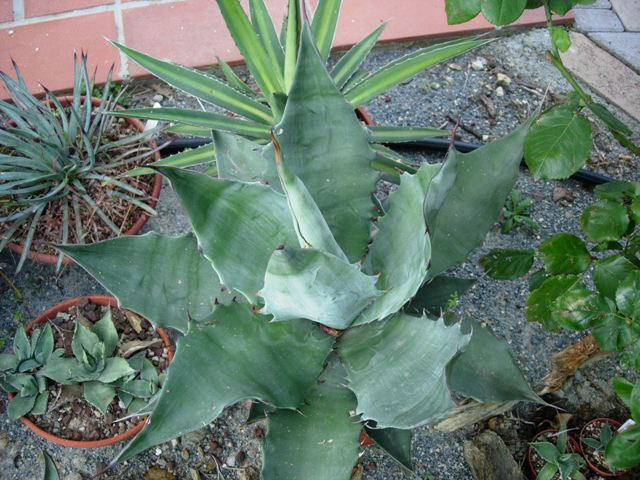

Conservation status
- Least Concern (IUCN 3.1)

Scientific classification
- Kingdom: Plantae
- Clade: Tracheophytes
- Clade: Angiosperms
- Clade: Monocots
- Order: Asparagales
- Family: Asparagaceae
- Subfamily: Agavoideae
- Genus: Agave
- Species: A. sobria

Binomial name
- Agave sobria Brandegee

= Agave sobria =

Species of plant

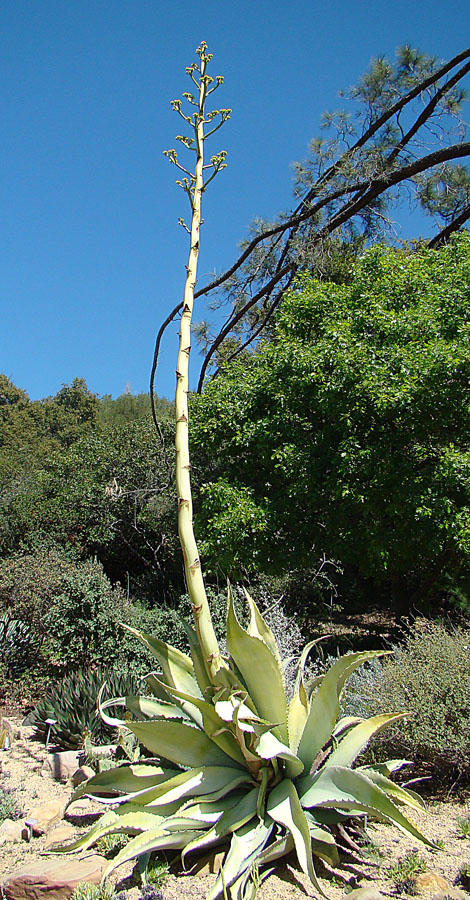

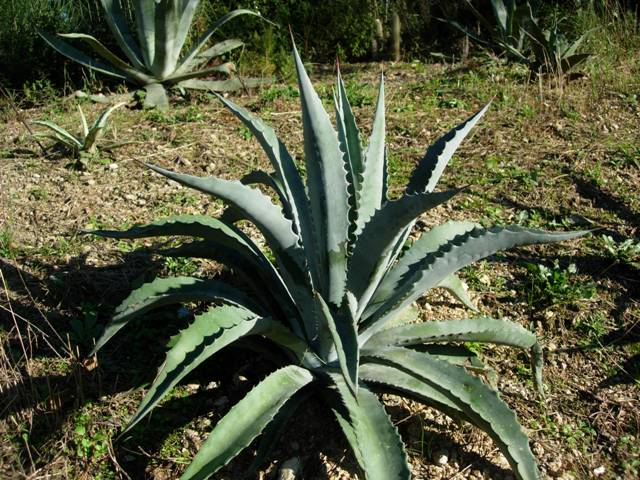
Agave sobria subsp. frailensis

Agave sobria, the Gulf agave, is a species of plant from the genus Agave. It has concave-like rosettes which holds stocky gray leaves that possesses burgeons. It is endemic to Mexico in mostly dry regions. The rosettes measure 1 to 1.8 m (3 ft 3 in to 5 ft 11 in) in breadth. The species was described in 1889.
