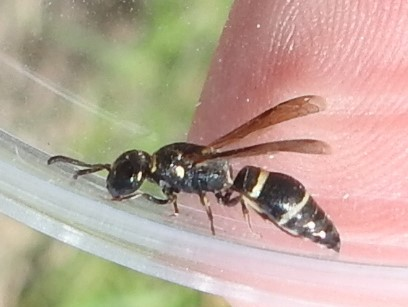
- Hypalastoroides mexicanus

Scientific classification
- Kingdom: Animalia
- Phylum: Arthropoda
- Clade: Pancrustacea
- Class: Insecta
- Order: Hymenoptera
- Family: Vespidae
- Subfamily: Eumeninae
- Genus: Hypalastoroides; Saussure, 1856

Type species
- Alastor brasiliensis Saussure, 1856.

Species
- See text

= Hypalastoroides =

Genus of wasps

Hypalastoroides is a neotropical genus of potter wasps with a few Nearctic and Andean species. It differs from other New World genera by having a petiolate second submarginal cell. The genus contains the following subgenera and species:

- Subgenus Hypalastoroides
  - Hypalastoroides angulicollis
  - Hypalastoroides anomalus
  - Hypalastoroides argentinus
  - Hypalastoroides aztecus
  - Hypalastoroides bicinctus
  - Hypalastoroides bicingulatus
  - Hypalastoroides brasiliensis
  - Hypalastoroides elongatus
  - Hypalastoroides impunctatus
  - Hypalastoroides melanosoma
  - Hypalastoroides mexicanus
  - Hypalastoroides nitidus
  - Hypalastoroides oliveri
  - Hypalastoroides paraguayensis
  - Hypalastoroides persimilis
  - Hypalastoroides pulchricolor
  - Hypalastoroides rotundiceps
  - Hypalastoroides ruficeps
  - Hypalastoroides venezuelanus
- Subgenus Larastoroides
  - Hypalastoroides costaricensis
  - Hypalastoroides ecuadoriensis
- Subgenus Ortalastoroides
  - Hypalastoroides arcuatus
  - Hypalastoroides clypeatus
  - Hypalastoroides columbianus
  - Hypalastoroides funereus
  - Hypalastoroides macrocephalus
  - Hypalastoroides singularis
  - Hypalastoroides slevini
