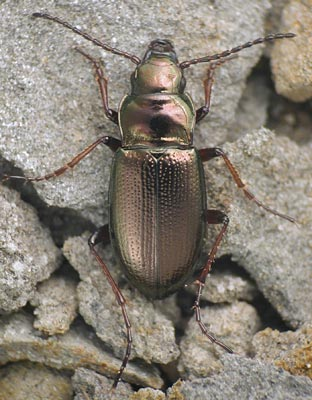

Scientific classification
- Domain: Eukaryota
- Kingdom: Animalia
- Phylum: Arthropoda
- Class: Insecta
- Order: Coleoptera
- Suborder: Adephaga
- Family: Trachypachidae
- Genus: Trachypachus
- Species: T. slevini

Binomial name
- Trachypachus slevini Van Dyke, 1925

= Trachypachus slevini =

Species of beetle

Trachypachus slevini, Slevin’s temporal false ground beetle, is a species of false ground beetle in the family Trachypachidae. It is found in North America (Oregon and Washington), where it occurs on sandy beaches along the Pacific Ocean.
