= Stenodactylus slevini =

Conservation status
- Least Concern (IUCN 3.1)

Scientific classification
- Kingdom: Animalia
- Phylum: Chordata
- Class: Reptilia
- Order: Squamata
- Suborder: Gekkota
- Family: Gekkonidae
- Genus: Stenodactylus
- Species: S. slevini

Binomial name
- Stenodactylus slevini G. Haas, 1957

Synonyms
- Stenodactylus slevini G. Haas, 1957; Stenodactylus arabicus G. Haas, 1957; Stenodactylus slevini — Wermuth, 1965; Stenodactylus haasi Kluge, 1967; Stenodactylus slevini — Kluge, 1993

Species of lizard

Stenodactylus slevini, also known commonly as Slevin's sand gecko or Slevin's short-fingered gecko, is a species of lizard in the family Gekkonidae. The species is native to Western Asia.

== Etymology ==
The specific name, slevini, is in honor of American herpetologist Joseph Richard Slevin.

== Geographic range ==
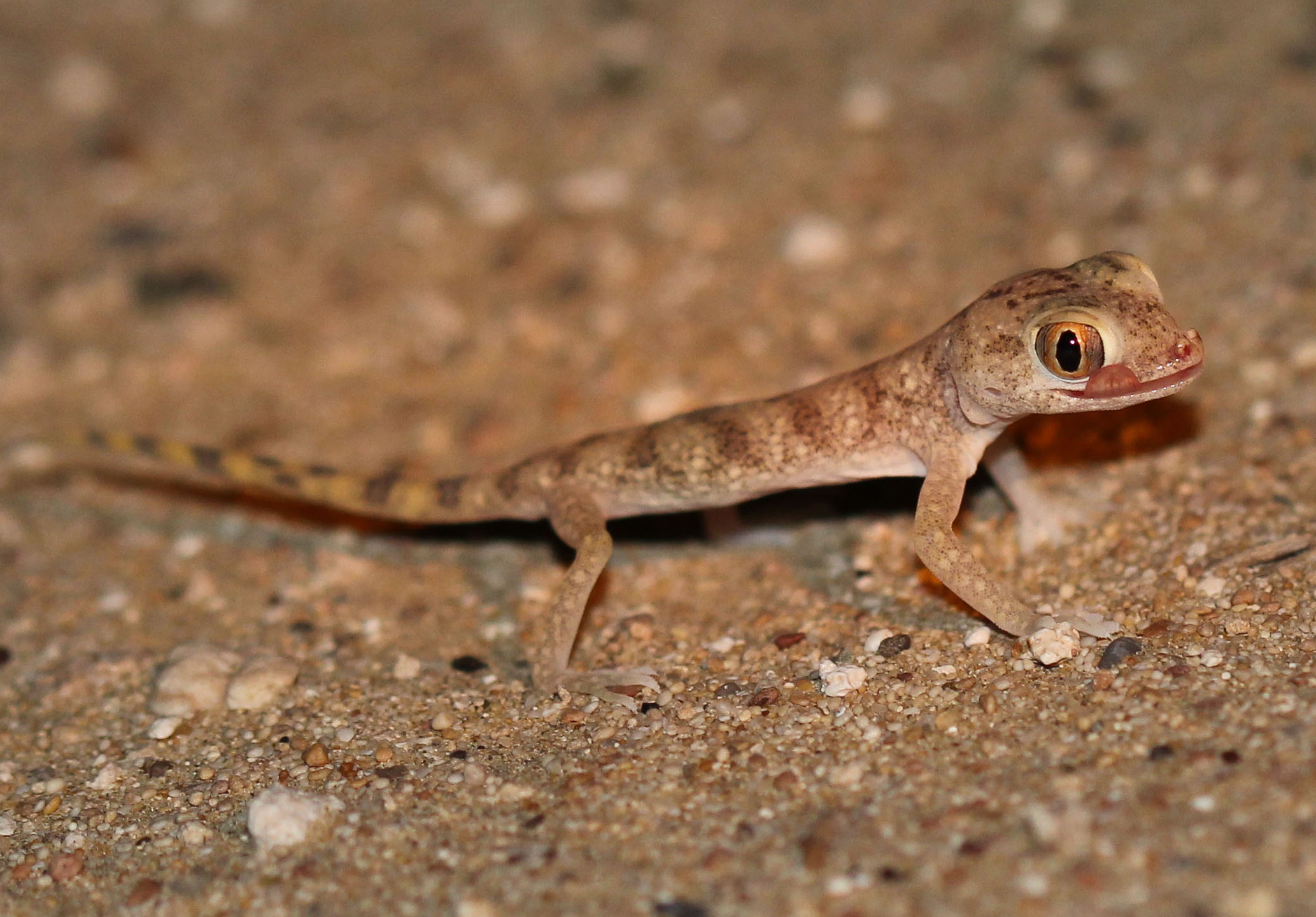
Slevin's sand gecko (Stenodactylus slevini) from United Arab Emirates

S. slevini is found in Bahrain, southern Iraq, southern Jordan, Kuwait, Qatar, northwestern Saudi Arabia, western United Arab Emirates, and Yemen.

== Habitat ==
The preferred natural habitat of S. slevini is desert, at altitudes from sea level to 1,000 m (3,300 ft).

== Description ==
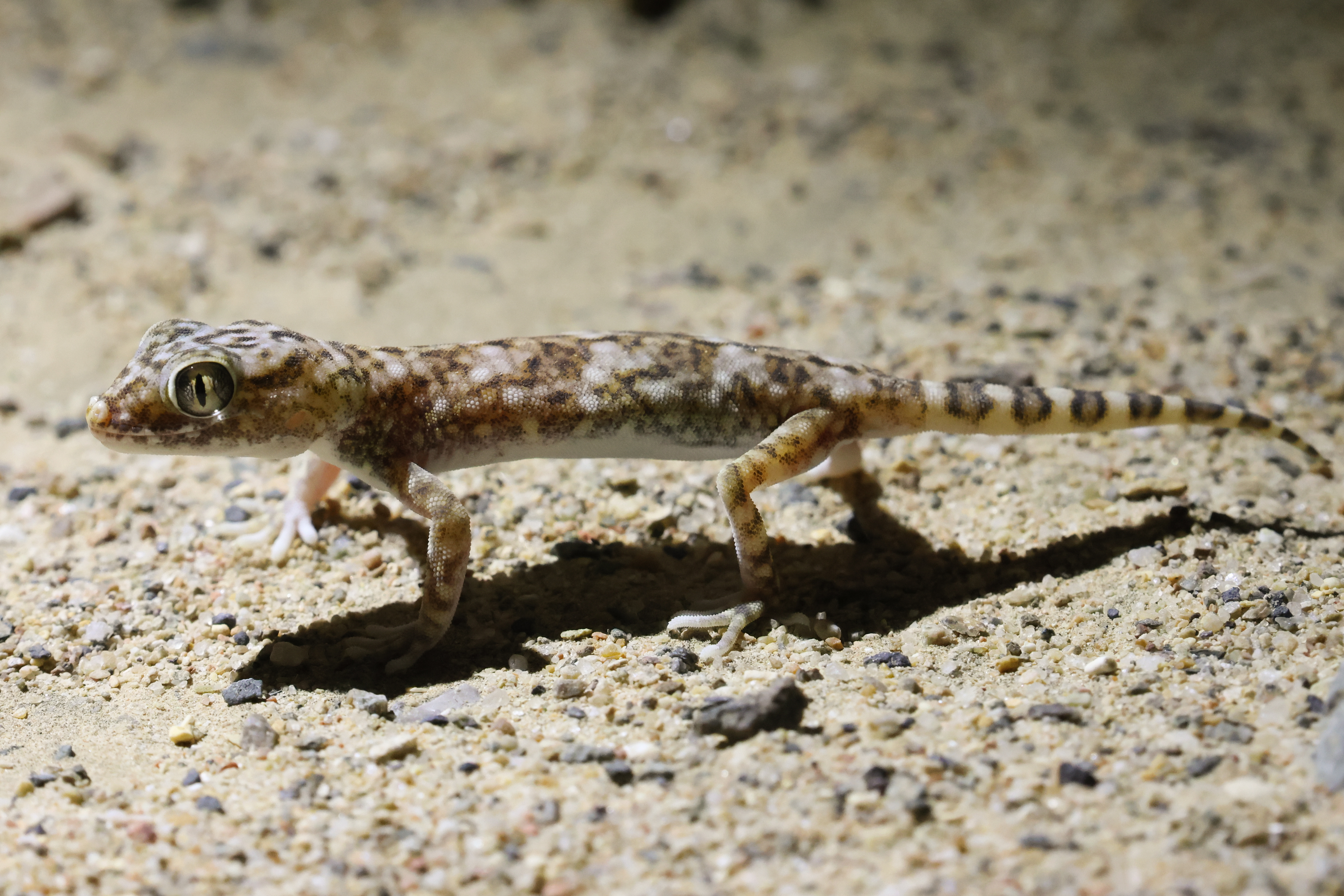
Stenodactylus slevini from Red Sea Coast, Saudi Arabia

A medium-sized species for its genus, S. slevini may attain a snout-to-vent length (SVL) of 6.3 cm (2.5 in).

== Reproduction ==
S. slevini is oviparous.
