= List of reptiles of Spain =

This is a list of all reptiles living in Spain, both in the Iberian Peninsula and other territories such as Ceuta, Melilla, the Balearic Islands and the Canary Islands (including marine reptiles that can be found on its shores). Both native and introduced species are included.

== Order Testudines ==
=== Family Testudinidae ===
Testudinidae
Species	Common name	Distribution	Conservation status (Note: Worldwide conservation status (not exclusive to the Iberian Peninsula) according to IUCN Red List: EX : Extinct; EW : Extinct in the Wild; CR : Critically Endangered; EN : Endangered; VU : Vulnerable; NT : Near Threatened; LC : Least Concern; DD : Data Deficient; NE : Not Evaluated)	Image
Testudo graeca	Spur-thighed tortoise		VU	Tortuga mora
Testudo hermanni	Hermann's tortoise		EN	Salamandra común

=== Family Emydidae ===
Emydidae
Species	Common name	Distribution	Conservation status	Image
Emys orbicularis	European pond turtle		LC	
Trachemys scripta	Pond slider		NT	

=== Family Geoemydidae ===
Geoemydidae
Species	Common name	Distribution	Conservation status	Image
Mauremys leprosa	Spanish pond turtle		NE (Note: Listed as Vulnerable VU in Spain)	

=== Family Dermochelyidae ===
Dermochelyidae
Species	Common name	Distribution	Conservation status	Image
Dermochelys coriacea	Leatherback sea turtle		CR	

=== Family Cheloniidae ===
Cheloniidae
Species	Common name	Distribution	Conservation status	Image
Caretta caretta	Loggerhead sea turtle	Distribution de C. caretta. Los círculos rojos representan los mayores anidamientos. Los amarillos son los de menor cuantía.	EN	
Chelonia mydas	Green sea turtle	Distribution de C. mydas. Los círculos rojos son sitios importantes de cría. Los círculos amarillos representan ubicaciones de menor importancia.	EN	
Eretmochelys imbricata	Hawksbill sea turtle		CR	

== Order Squamata ==
=== Family Chamaeleonidae ===
Chamaeleontidae
Species	Common name	Distribution	Conservation status	Image
Chamaeleo chamaeleon	Common Chameleon		NE (Note: Listed as Near Threatened NT on national level, and Vulnerable VU on local level)	

=== Family Blanidae ===
Blanidae
Species	Common name	Distribution	Conservation status	Image
Blanus cinereus	Iberian Worm Lizard		LC	Culebrilla ciega
Blanus tingitanus	-		LC	

=== Family Agamidae ===
Agamidae
Species	Common name	Distribution	Conservation status	Image
Agama impalearis	Bibron's agama		NE (Note: Listed as Least Concern LC in Spain)	

=== Family Anguidae ===
Anguidae
Species	Common name	Distribution	Conservation status	Image
Anguis fragilis	Slowworm		NE (Note: Listed as Least Concern LC in Spain)	Lución

=== Gekkota (families Gekkonidae, Sphaerodactylidae, Phyllodactylidae) ===
Gekkonidae
Species	Common name	Distribution	Conservation status	Image
Hemidactylus turcicus	Mediterranean house gecko		LC	
Saurodactylus mauritanicus	-		LC	
Tarentola angustimentalis	East Canary Gecko		LC	
Tarentola boettgeri	Boettger's Wall Gecko		LC	
Tarentola delalandii	Tenerife Gecko		LC	
Tarentola gomerensis	Gomero Wall Gecko		LC	
Tarentola mauritanica	Common or Moorish Wall Gecko, Salamanquesa, Crocodile gecko, European common gecko, Maurita naca gecko		LC	

=== Family Scincidae ===
Scincidae
Species	Common name	Distribution	Conservation status	Image
Chalcides bedriagai	Bedriaga's Skink		NT	Eslizón ibérico
Chalcides coeruleopunctatus	-		NE (Note: Listed as Data Deficient DD in Spain)	
Chalcides colosii	Riffian Skink, Colosi's Cylindrical Skink		LC	
Chalcides mauritanicus	Two-Fingered Skink		EN	
Chalcides minutus	Small Three-Toed Skink		VU	
Chalcides ocellatus	Ocellated Skink, Eyed Skink, gongilo		NE (Note: Listed as Least Concern LC in Spain)	
Chalcides parallelus	Doumergue's Skink		EN	
Chalcides pseudostriatus	Moroccan Three-toed Skink		NT	
Chalcides sexlineatus	Gran Canaria Skink		LC	
Chalcides simonyi	-		EN	
Chalcides striatus	Western Three-toed Skink		LC	
Chalcides viridanus	West Canary Skink, Lisa Dorada		LC	
Eumeces algeriensis	Algerian Orange-Tailed Skink, Eumece D'Algerie, Bulán		LC	

=== Family Lacertidae ===
Lacertidae
Species	Common name	Distribution	Conservation status	Image
Acanthodactylus erythrurus	Red-tailed Spiny-footed Lizard		LC	
Algyroides marchi	Spanish Algyroides		EN	
Gallotia atlantica	Atlantic Lizard		LC	
Gallotia auaritae	La Palma Giant Lizard		CR	
Gallotia bravoana	La Gomera Giant Lizard		CR	
Gallotia caesaris	Boettger's Lizard		LC	
Gallotia galloti	Tenerife Lizard, Western Canaries Lizard		LC	
Gallotia intermedia	Tenerife Speckled Lizard		CR	
Gallotia simonyi	El Hierro Giant Lizard		CR	
Gallotia stehlini	Gran Canaria Giant Lizard		LC	
Iberolacerta aranica	Aran Rock Lizard		EN	
Iberolacerta aurelioi	Aurelio's Rock Lizard		EN	
Iberolacerta bonnali	Pyrenean Rock Lizard		NT	
Iberolacerta cyreni	-		EN	
Iberolacerta galani	Lagartija leonesa		NT	
Iberolacerta martinezricai	-		CR	
Iberolacerta monticola	Iberian Rock Lizard		VU	
Lacerta agilis	Sand Lizard		NE (Note: Listed as Near Threatened NT in Spain)	
Lacerta bilineata	Western Green Lizard	Distribution de L. bilineata	LC	
Lacerta schreiberi	Iberian Emerald Lizard, Schreiber's Green Lizard		NT	Lagarto verdinegro
Podarcis atrata	-		NE (Note: Listed as Vulnerable VU in Spain)	
Podarcis bocagei	Bocage's Wall Lizard		LC	
Podarcis carbonelli	-		EN	
Podarcis hispanicus	Iberian Wall Lizard		LC	
Podarcis lilfordi	Lilford's Wall Lizard		EN	
Podarcis muralis	Wall lizard		LC	
Podarcis pityusensis	Ibiza Wall Lizard		NT	
Podarcis siculus	Italian wall lizard, Ruin lizard		LC	
Podarcis vaucheri	-		LC	
Psammodromus algirus	Large Psammodromus		LC	
Psammodromus blanci	Blanc's Sand Racer		NT	
Psammodromus hispanicus	Spanish Psammodromus		NT	
Psammodromus jeanneae	-		LC	
Psammodromus manuelae	-		LC	
Scelarcis perspicillata	Moroccan rock lizard		LC	
Timon lepidus	Ocellated Lizard		NT	Lagarto ocelado
Timon tangitana	-		LC	
Zootoca vivipara	Viviparous lizard, common lizard		LC	

=== Family Trogonophidae ===
Trogonophidae
Species	Common name	Distribution	Conservation status	Image
Trogonophis wiegmanni	Checkerboard worm lizard		LC	

=== Serpentes ===
==== Family Colubridae ====
Colubridae
Species	Common name	Distribution	Conservation status	Image
Coronella austriaca	Smooth snake		NE (Note: Listed as Least Concern LC in Spain)	
Coronella girondica	Southern smooth snake, Riccioli's snake		LC	Culebra lisa meridional
Hemorrhois hippocrepis	Horseshoe whip snake		LC	
Hierophis viridiflavus	Green Whip Snake, Western Whip Snake		LC	
Macroprotodon abubakeri	-		DD (Note: Listed as Data Deficient DD in Spain)	
Macroprotodon brevis	False smooth snake		NT	
Macroprotodon mauritanicus	-		NE (Note: Listed as Data Deficient DD in Spain)	
Malpolon monspessulanus	Montpellier snake		LC	
Natrix maura	Viperine water snake, viperine snake		LC	Culebra viperina
Natrix natrix	Grass snake, ringed snake, water snake		LC	Culebra de collar
Zamenis scalaris	Ladder snake		LC	Culebra de escalera
Zamenis longissimus	Aesculapian Snake		LC	

==== Family Viperidae ====
Viperidae
Species	Common name	Distribution	Conservation status	Image
Vipera aspis	Asp, asp viper, European asp, aspic viper, European viper, Jura viper		LC	
Vipera latastei	Lataste's viper, snub-nosed viper, snub-nosed adder		VU	
Vipera seoanei	Baskian viper, Iberian cross adder, Portuguese viper		LC	Víbora cantábrica
