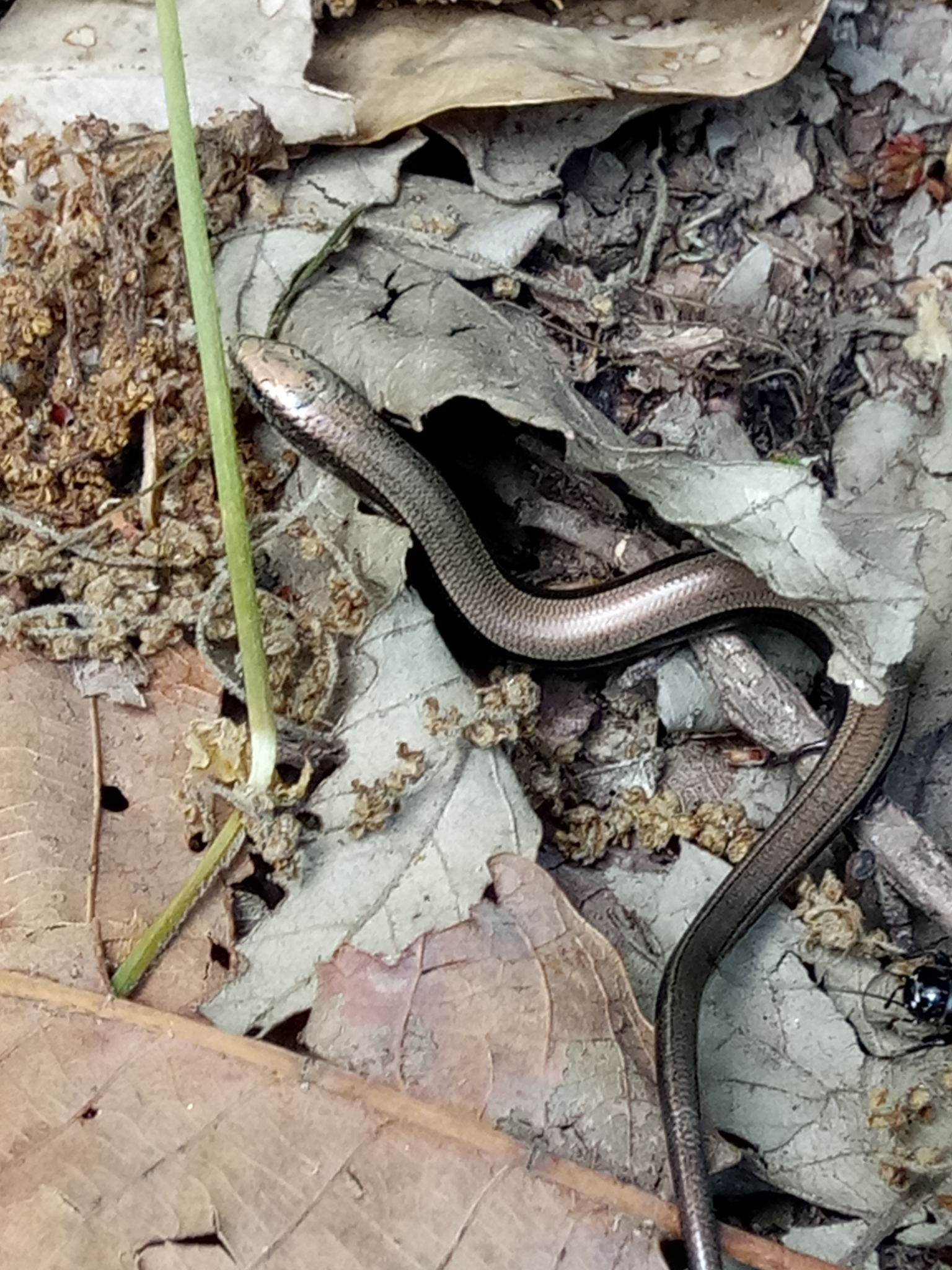

Conservation status
- Least Concern (IUCN 3.1)

Scientific classification
- Kingdom: Animalia
- Phylum: Chordata
- Class: Reptilia
- Order: Squamata
- Family: Scincidae
- Genus: Chalcides
- Species: C. mertensi

Binomial name
- Chalcides mertensi Klausewitz, 1954
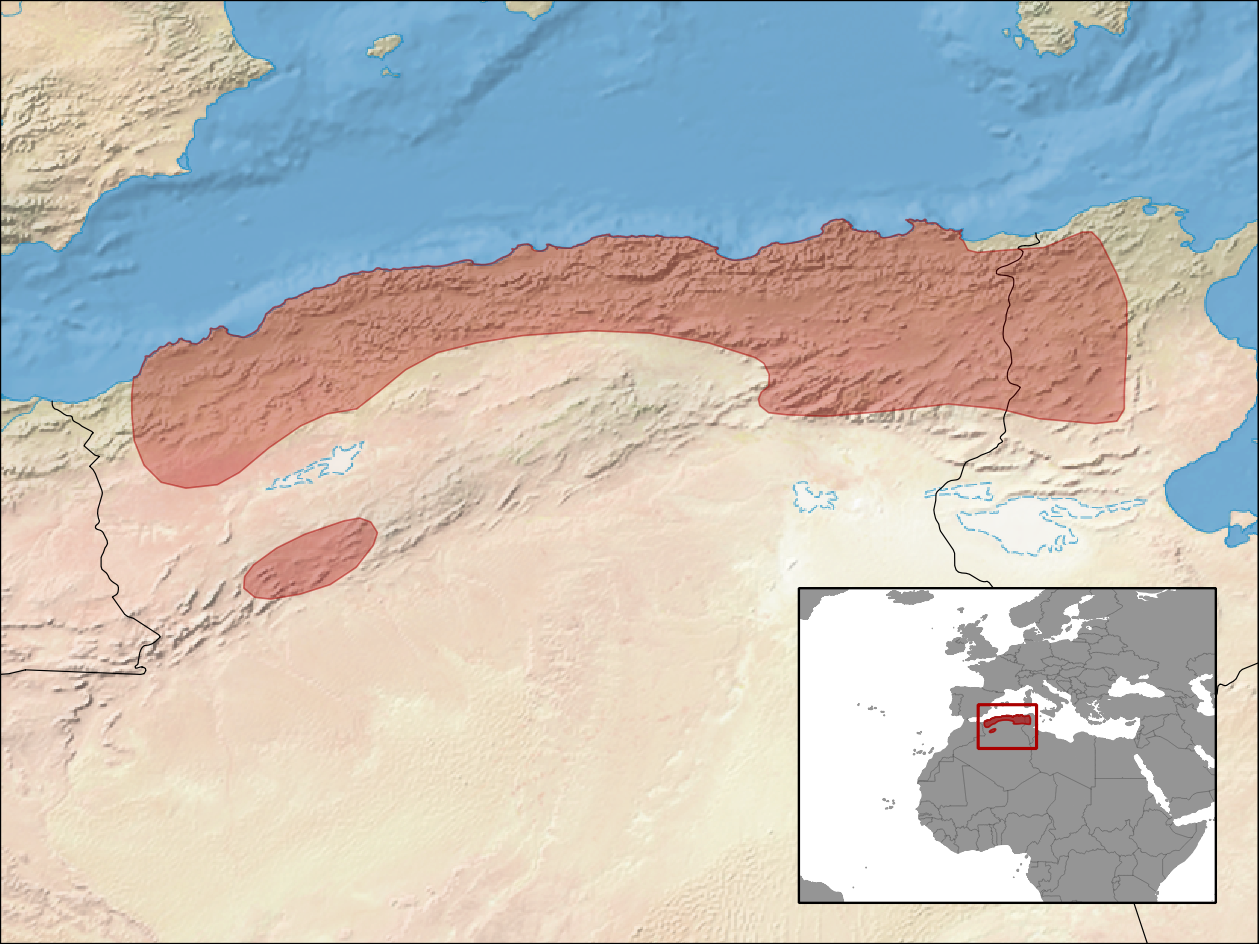

Synonyms
- Chalcides chalcides ssp. mertensi Klausewitz, 1954

= Algerian three-toed skink =

Species of reptile

The Algerian three-toed skink (Chalcides mertensi) is a species of "grass-swimming skink", a lizard in the subfamily Scincinae of the family Scincidae. The species has an elongated serpentine shape and reduced limbs. It is native to north-western Africa.

== Etymology ==
The specific name, mertensi, is in honor of German herpetologist Robert Mertens.

== Geographic distribution ==
Chalcides mertensi is native to northern Algeria and northern Tunisia, where it occurs on the Mediterranean coast.

== Habitat ==
The Algerian three-toed skink lives in forested areas in northern Algeria, and in semi-arid maquis-type habitats in Algeria and Tunisia. It prefers humid, sunny areas with dense vegetation within grassland, meadows, areas close to streams, hedges, open cork oak forest, and the edges of cultivated areas. It is also known from tall herbaceous grassland. The females give birth to formed young. It has been recorded at elevations from sea level to 1,500 m (4,900 ft).

== Taxonomy ==
The Algerian three-toed skink was formerly considered to be as a subspecies of the Italian three-toed skink Chalcides chalcides, but it was raised to species status by Caputo (1993). It has further been proposed that as molecular studies identified different lineages of the Algerian three-toed skink from samples in the northern and southern parts of its range in Tunisia and suggest there are at least two species present but recommended further research. Another molecular study showed that this species was in a clade of Chalcides called the grass-swimming clade alongside Chalcides chalcides, Chalcides minutus and Chalcides mauritanicus, Chalcides guentheri, Chalcides pseudostriatus and Chalcides striatus, and it seems to be closest to eastern specimens of Chalcides minutus rather than Chalcides chalcides.

A 2017 study of a specimen collected in the Théniet El Had National Park found that while the individual morphologically resembled C. mertensi (possessing the characteristic dorsal stripes), it was genetically distinct and nested within the Chalcides minutus lineage. This suggests that dorsal patterns may not be a reliable diagnostic trait for distinguishing C. mertensi from C. minutus in localized populations.

== Reproduction ==
Chalcides mertensi is viviparous.

== Conservation ==
The Algerian three-toed skink is listed as least concern but is threatened by habitat loss caused by overgrazing and the conversion of land to agricultural and urbanisation. It occurs in the Djurdjura National Park in Algeria but is not known to occur in any protected areas in Tunisia.
