= Three-toed skink =

The three-toed skink can refer to several animals, all of the family Scincidae:

- Algerian three-toed skink (Chalcides mertensi)
- Italian three-toed skink (Chalcides chalcides)
- Moroccan three-toed skink (Chalcides pseudostriatus)
- Three-toed earless skink (Hemiergis decresiensis)
- Three-toed snake-tooth skink (Coeranoscincus reticulatus)
- Western three-toed skink (Chalcides striatus)
- Yellow-bellied three-toed skink (the genus Saiphos)
