= Chalcides lanzai =

Conservation status
- Near Threatened (IUCN 3.1)

Scientific classification
- Kingdom: Animalia
- Phylum: Chordata
- Class: Reptilia
- Order: Squamata
- Family: Scincidae
- Genus: Chalcides
- Species: C. lanzai

Binomial name
- Chalcides lanzai G. Pasteur, 1967
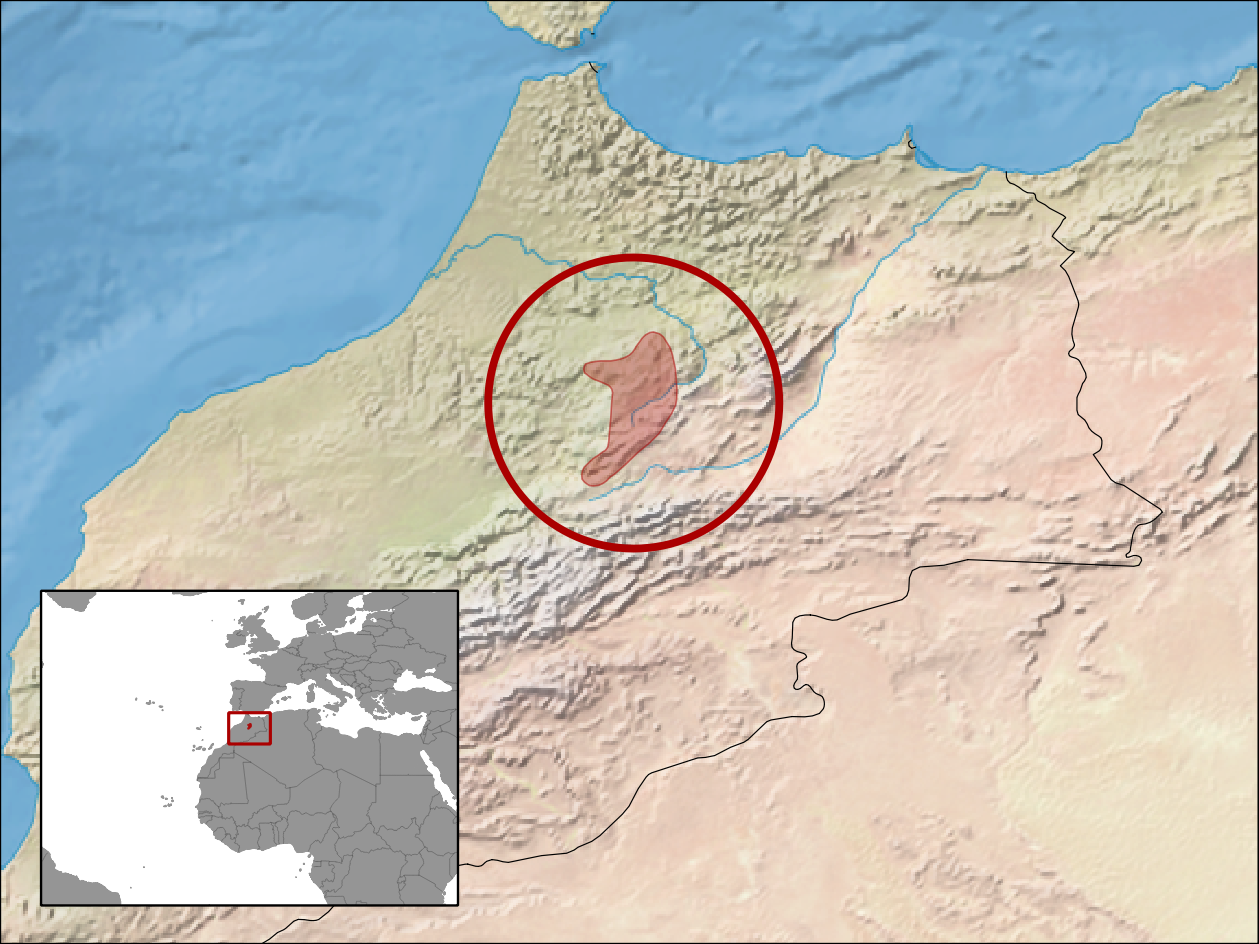

Synonyms
- Chalcides ocellatus lanzai G. Pasteur, 1967; Chalcides lanzai — Caputo & Mellado, 1992; Chalcides montanus lanzai — Schlüter, 2004

Species of lizard

Chalcides lanzai, or Lanza's skink, is a species of skink, a lizard in the family Scincidae. The species is endemic to Morocco.

== Taxonomy ==
Chalcides lanzai has been considered a subspecies of Chalcides montanus and of Chalcides ocellatus.

== Etymology ==
The specific name, lanzai, is in honor of Italian herpetologist Benedetto Lanza.

== Habitat ==
C. lanzai is usually found in forest and grassland areas, and is common in the areas where it can be found.

== Conservation status ==
C. lanzai is unlikely to be under serious threat, though it has been affected from habitat degradation due to overgrazing.

== Reproduction ==
Adult females of the species C. lanzai give birth to live young. Its mode of reproduction has been described as being viviparous and as being ovoviviparous.
