= C. parallelus =

C. parallelus may refer to:

- Chalcides parallelus, the Doumergue's skink, a skink species found in Algeria, Morocco and Spain
- Chomatodus parallelus, a prehistoric fish species
- Chorthippus parallelus, the meadow grasshopper, a grasshopper species found in Europe and some adjoining areas of Asia
