= Chalcides ragazzii =

Scientific classification
- Kingdom: Animalia
- Phylum: Chordata
- Class: Reptilia
- Order: Squamata
- Family: Scincidae
- Genus: Chalcides
- Species: C. ragazzii

Binomial name
- Chalcides ragazzii Boulenger, 1890

Synonyms
- Chalcides ocellatus Var. ragazzii Boulenger, 1890; Chalcides ocellatus ragazzii — Mertens, 1921; Chalcides ragazzii — G. Pasteur, 1981

Species of lizard

Chalcides ragazzii, commonly called Ragazzi's cylindrical skink, is a species of lizard in the family Scincidae. The species is endemic to Africa.

== Geographic range ==
C. ragazzii is found from Algeria (Ahaggar Mountains), Niger, northern Somalia and northern Kenya, to Ethiopia, Eritrea, and south-eastern Sahara.

== Description ==
C. ragazzii is a large, pentadactyl skink (that is, it has five digits on each limb).

== Reproduction ==
C. ragazzii is viviparous.

== Etymology ==
The specific name, ragazzii, is in honor of the collector of the holotype, Italian physician Dr. Vincenzo Ragazzi (1856–1929) of the Modena Natural History Society.
