= Chalcides armitagei =

Conservation status
- Near Threatened (IUCN 3.1)

Scientific classification
- Kingdom: Animalia
- Phylum: Chordata
- Class: Reptilia
- Order: Squamata
- Family: Scincidae
- Genus: Chalcides
- Species: C. armitagei

Binomial name
- Chalcides armitagei E.G. Boulenger, 1922

Species of lizard

Chalcides armitagei, also known commonly as Armitage's cylindrical skink, is a species of lizard in the subfamily Scincinae of the family Scincidae. The species is endemic to West Africa.

== Etymology ==
The specific name, armitagei, is in honor of Cecil Hamilton Armitage (1869–1933), who collected the type specimen while he was Governor of the Gambia.

== Geographic range ==
Chalcides armitagei is found in Gambia, Guinea-Bissau, and Senegal.

== Habitat ==
The preferred natural habitat of Chalcides armitagei is vegetated coastal dunes, where it can be found under leaf litter. It has also been found in artificial plantations.

== Diet ==
Chalcides armitagei preys upon small insects.

== Reproduction ==
Chalcides armitagei is viviparous.

== Note ==
There have been several errors in the scientific literature concerning Chalcides armitagei. For the year of description, Frank & Ramus (1995) give 1896, while Pasteur (1981) gives 1920 and 1921. Also, the original describer, Edward George Boulenger, has been confused with his father, George Albert Boulenger.
