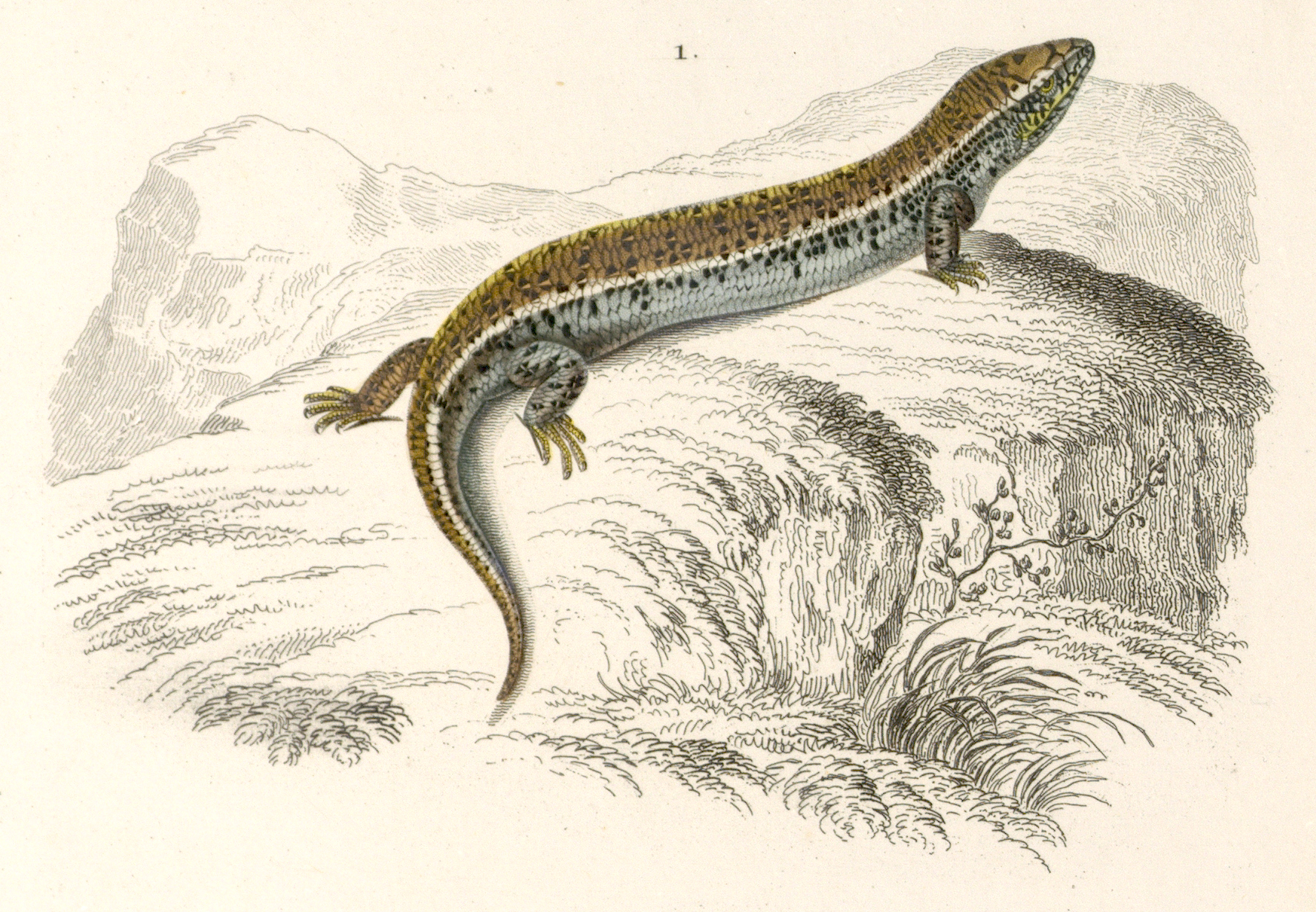
- Chalcides ocellatus

Scientific classification
- Kingdom: Animalia
- Phylum: Chordata
- Class: Reptilia
- Order: Squamata
- Family: Scincidae
- Subfamily: Scincinae
- Genus: Chalcides; Laurenti, 1768

Species
- About 30, see text.

= Chalcides =

Genus of reptiles

Chalcides is a genus of skinks (family Scincidae).

It is usually placed in the subfamily Scincinae (= Scincidae sensu Hedges 2014), a monophyletic clade of primarily African skinks.

== Species ==
The following species are recognized as being valid.

- Chalcides armitagei Boulenger, 1922 – Armitage's cylindrical skink
- Chalcides bedriagai (Boscá, 1880) – Bedriaga's skink
- Chalcides bottegi Boulenger, 1898 – Bottego's cylindrical skink, ocellated skink
- Chalcides boulengeri J. Anderson, 1892 – Boulenger's feylinia, Boulenger's wedge-snouted skink
- Chalcides chalcides (Linnaeus, 1758) – cylindrical skink, Italian three-toed skink
- Chalcides coeruleopunctatus Salvador, 1975 – La Gomera skink
- Chalcides colosii Lanza, 1957 – Colosi's cylindrical skink
- Chalcides delislei (Lataste & Rochebrune, 1876) – Delisle's wedge-snouted skink
- Chalcides ebneri F. Werner, 1931 – Ebner's cylindrical skink
- Chalcides guentheri Boulenger, 1887 – Günther's cylindrical skink
- Chalcides lanzai G. Pasteur, 1967 – Lanza's skink
- Chalcides levitoni G. Pasteur, 1978 – Leviton's cylindrical skink
- Chalcides manueli Hediger, 1935 – Manuel's skink
- Chalcides mauritanicus (A.M.C. Duméril & Bibron, 1839) – two-fingered skink
- Chalcides mertensi Klausewitz, 1954 – Algerian three-toed skink
- Chalcides minutus Caputo, 1993 – small three-toed skink
- Chalcides mionecton (Boettger, 1874) – Mionecton skink, Morocco cylindrical skink
- Chalcides montanus F. Werner, 1931
- Chalcides ocellatus (Forskål, 1775) – eyed skink, gongilo, ocellated skink
- Chalcides parallelus Doumergue, 1901 – Chafarinas's skink
- Chalcides pentadactylus (Beddome, 1870) – five-fingered skink
- Chalcides polylepis Boulenger, 1890 – many-scaled cylindrical skink
- Chalcides pseudostriatus Caputo, 1993 – Moroccan three-toed skink
- Chalcides pulchellus Mocquard, 1906 – Mocquard's cylindrical skink
- Chalcides ragazzii Boulenger, 1890 – Ragazzi's cylindrical skink
- Chalcides sepsoides (Audouin, 1829) – wedge-snouted skink
- Chalcides sexlineatus Steindachner, 1891 – Gran Canaria skink
- Chalcides simonyi Steindachner, 1891 – East Canary skink, Fuerteventura skink
- Chalcides sphenopsiformis (A.H.A. Duméril, 1856) – Duméril's wedge-snouted skink
- Chalcides striatus (Cuvier, 1829) – western three-toed skink
- Chalcides thierryi Tornier, 1901 – Thierry's cylindrical skink
- Chalcides viridanus (Gravenhorst, 1851) – Canaryan cylindrical skink, East Canary Islands skink, Tenerife skink, West Canary skink

Nota bene: In the above list, a binomial authority in parentheses indicates that the species was originally described in a genus other than Chalcides.
