= Ocellated skink =

Ocellated skink may refer to:

- Chalcides ocellatus, found around the Mediterranean
- Chalcides bottegi, found in Ethiopia, Kenya, and Sudan
- Niveoscincus ocellatus, the Tasmanian ocellated or spotted skink
