= Chalcides levitoni =

Conservation status
- Data Deficient (IUCN 3.1)

Scientific classification
- Kingdom: Animalia
- Phylum: Chordata
- Class: Reptilia
- Order: Squamata
- Family: Scincidae
- Genus: Chalcides
- Species: C. levitoni

Binomial name
- Chalcides levitoni G. Pasteur, 1978
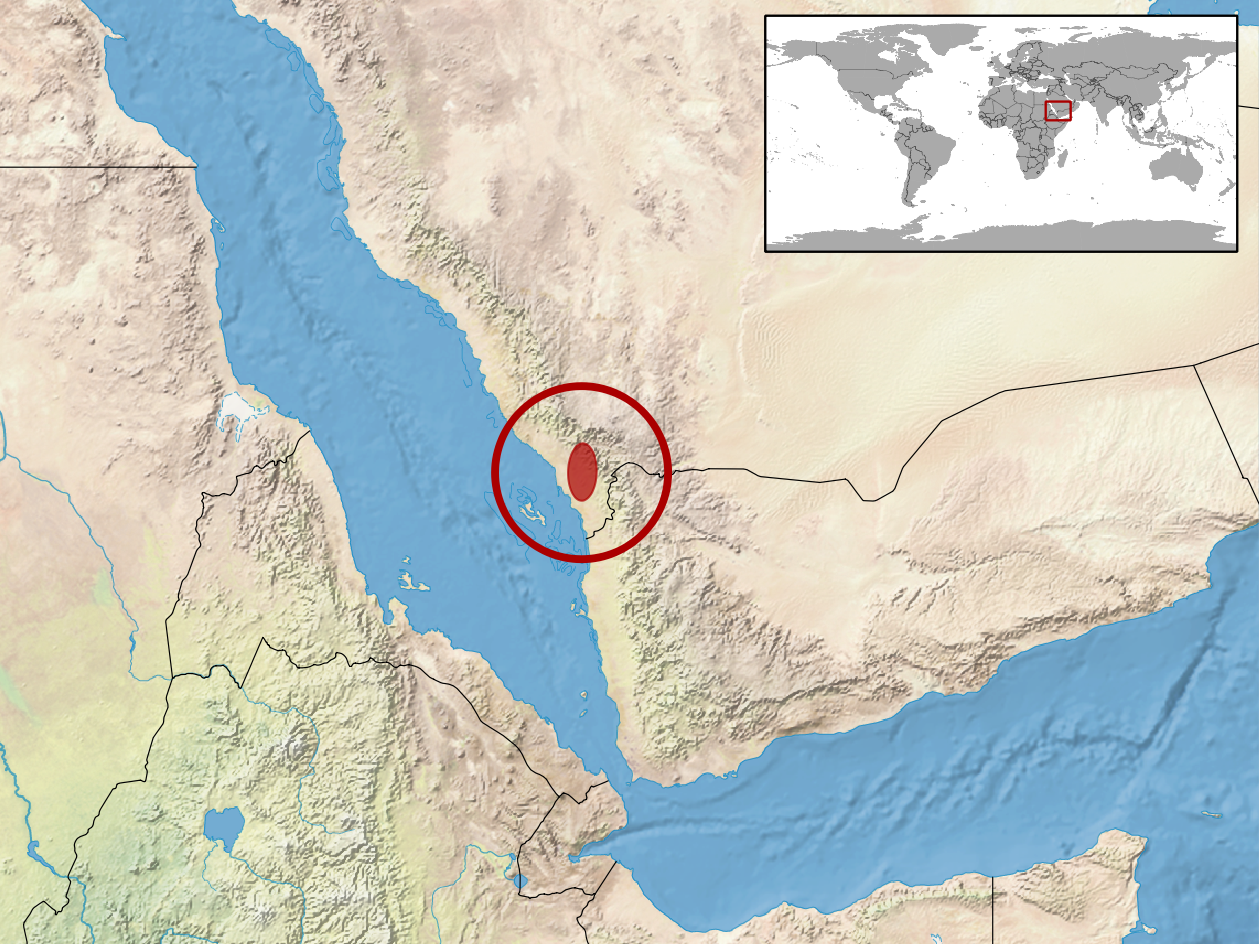

Species of lizard

Chalcides levitoni, commonly called Leviton's cylindrical skink, is a species of lizard in the family Scincidae. The species is endemic to Saudi Arabia.

== Geographic range ==
C. levitoni is found in Jizan Province, Saudi Arabia.

== Etymology ==
The specific name, levitoni, is in honor of American herpetologist Alan E. Leviton (born 1930), who is an expert on the herpetofauna of the Arabian Peninsula.

== Reproduction ==
C. levitoni is ovoviviparous.
