= Wedge-snouted skink =

There are two species of skink named wedge-snouted skink:

- Chalcides sepsoides, species of skink found in Egypt, Israel, Jordan, Libya, and the Palestinian territories
- Trachylepis acutilabris, species of skink found in Namibia, Angola, Democratic Republic of the Congo, and South Africa
