= Many-scaled cylindrical skink =

Conservation status
- Least Concern (IUCN 3.1)

Scientific classification
- Kingdom: Animalia
- Phylum: Chordata
- Class: Reptilia
- Order: Squamata
- Suborder: Scinciformata
- Infraorder: Scincomorpha
- Family: Scincidae
- Genus: Chalcides
- Species: C. polylepis

Binomial name
- Chalcides polylepis Boulenger, 1890
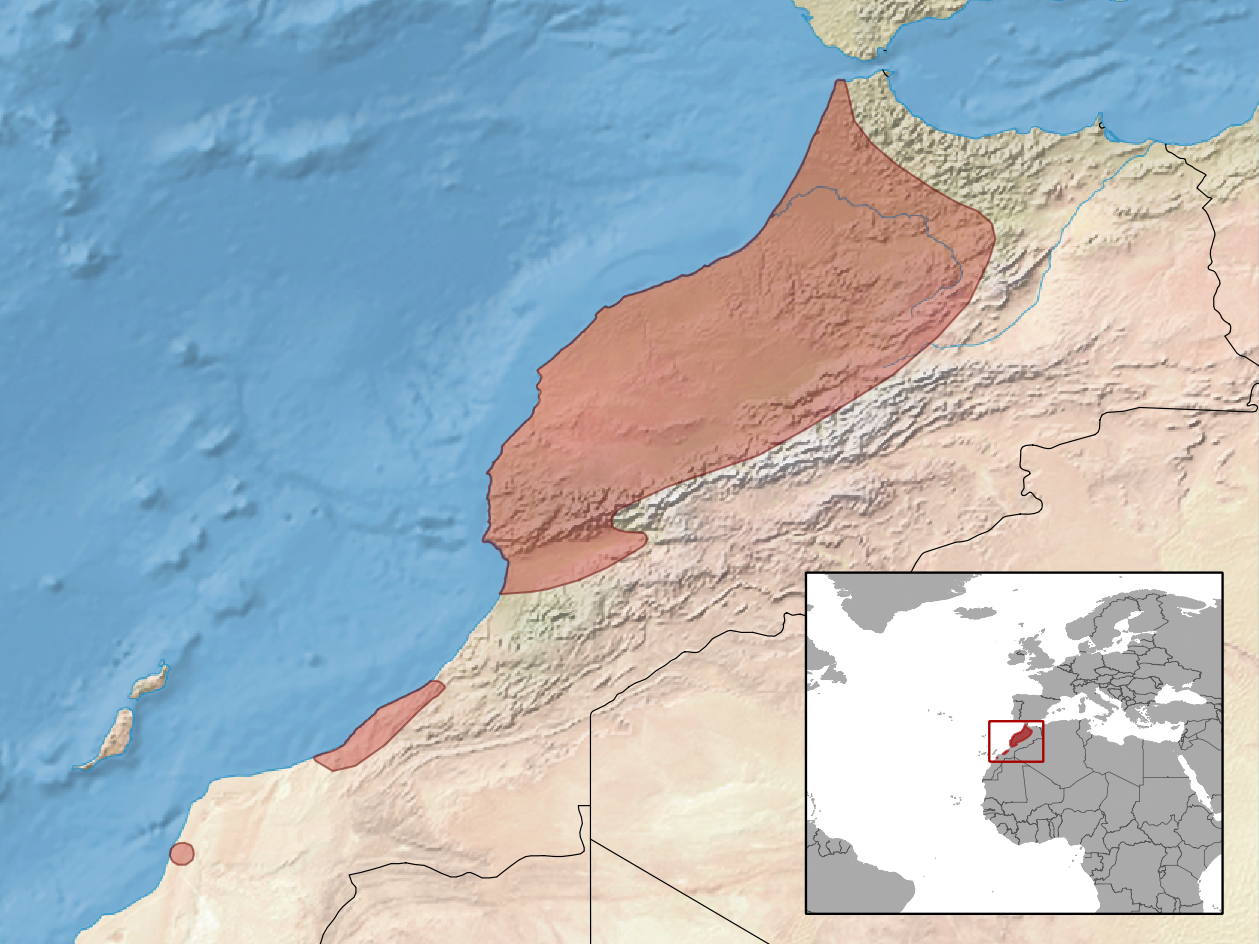

Species of lizard

The many-scaled cylindrical skink (Chalcides polylepis) is a species of skink in the family Scincidae. It is found in Morocco and Western Sahara. Its natural habitats are temperate forests, temperate shrubland, Mediterranean-type shrubby vegetation, rocky areas, sandy shores, and pastureland. It is threatened by habitat loss.
