= Chalcides manueli =

Conservation status
- Vulnerable (IUCN 3.1)

Scientific classification
- Kingdom: Animalia
- Phylum: Chordata
- Class: Reptilia
- Order: Squamata
- Family: Scincidae
- Genus: Chalcides
- Species: C. manueli

Binomial name
- Chalcides manueli Hediger, 1935
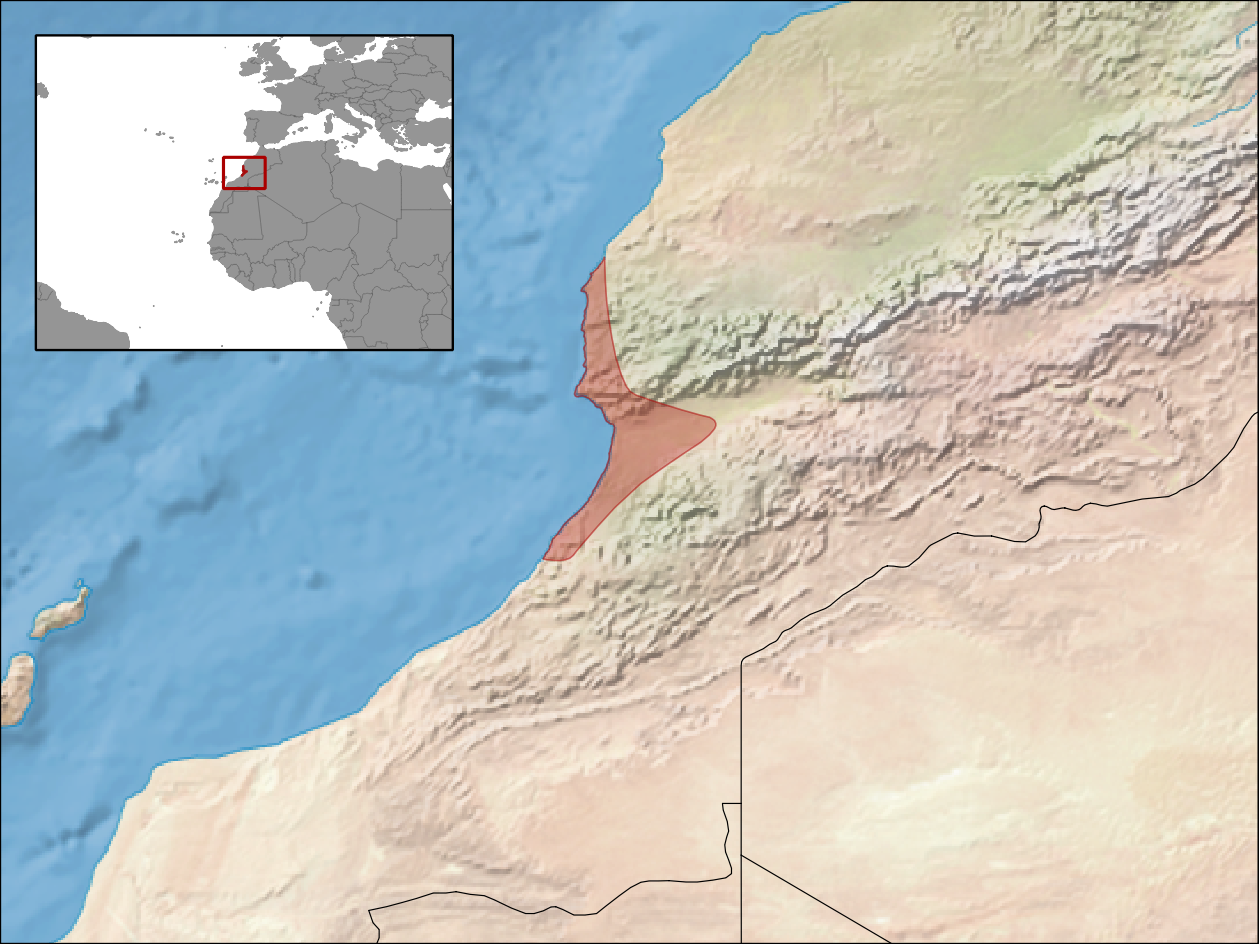

Synonyms
- Chalcides ocellatus manueli Hediger, 1935; Chalcides manueli — Caputo & Mellado, 1992

Species of lizard

Chalcides manueli, commonly known as Manuel's skink, is a species of lizard in the subfamily Scincinae of the family Scincidae. The species is endemic to Morocco.

== Geographic range ==
Chalcides manueli is found in western Morocco, west of the High Atlas and Anti-Atlas mountain ranges.

== Habitat ==
Chalcides manueli is found in a variety of natural habitats, from intertidal and supralittoral zones to shrubland and forest, at elevations up to 256 m (840 ft).

== Etymology ==
The specific name, manueli, is in honor of Albert Manuel of Rabat who helped Hediger to organize an expedition to Morocco.

== Reproduction ==
Adult females of Chalcides manueli give birth to live young, by a mode of reproduction which has been variously described as being viviparous and as being ovoviviparous.

== Conservation status ==
Chalcides manueli is somewhat rare throughout its distribution and is affected by deforestation, desertification, and overgrazing. It is likely that the species is in decline, and its range is severely fragmented.
