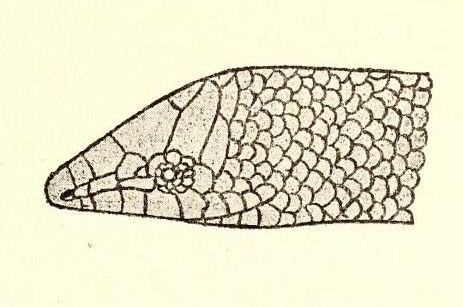

Conservation status
- Data Deficient (IUCN 3.1)

Scientific classification
- Kingdom: Animalia
- Phylum: Chordata
- Class: Reptilia
- Order: Squamata
- Suborder: Scinciformata
- Infraorder: Scincomorpha
- Family: Scincidae
- Genus: Chalcides
- Species: C. pentadactylus

Binomial name
- Chalcides pentadactylus (Beddome, 1870)

= Chalcides pentadactylus =

Five-fingered skink

Species of lizard

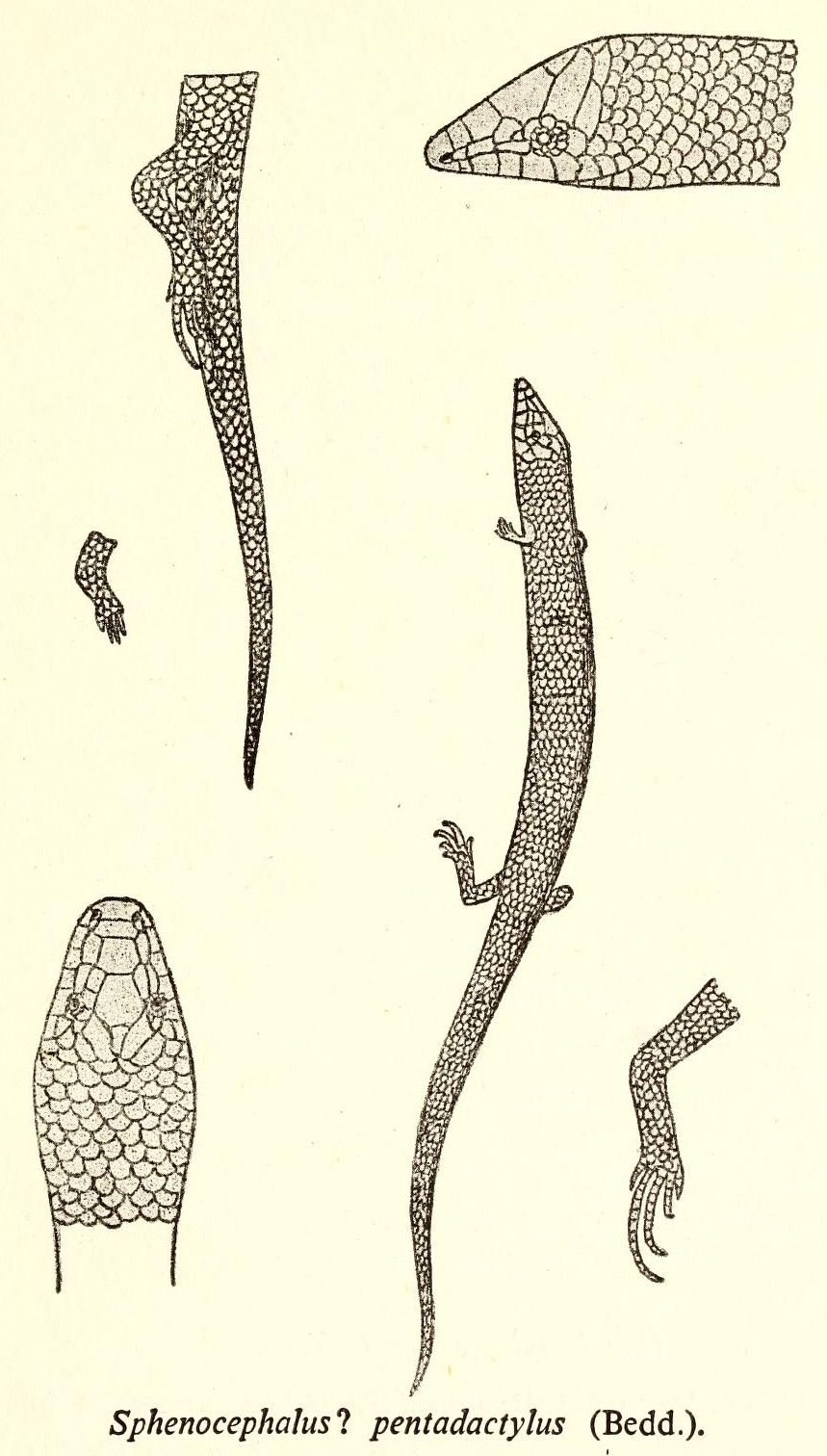
Chalcides pentadactylus

Chalcides pentadactylus, or five-fingered skink, is a species of skink found in the Western Ghats of India. Females of other species of the genus are viviparous, meaning that they give birth to live young. Almost nothing is known of C. pentadactylus. It is only known from the holotype which is lost [ fide Smith 1935]. Due to the loss of the only known specimen the true identity and origin of this skink, and its correct generic assignment, must await the examination of fresh material (Srinivasulu & Srinivasulu 2013).

Type locality: "Kuddle Poondy, a tidal river near Beypore" (= Kadal Undi, Beypur, 11° 11' N; 75° 49' E, in Kerala State, south-western India), Malabar district.
