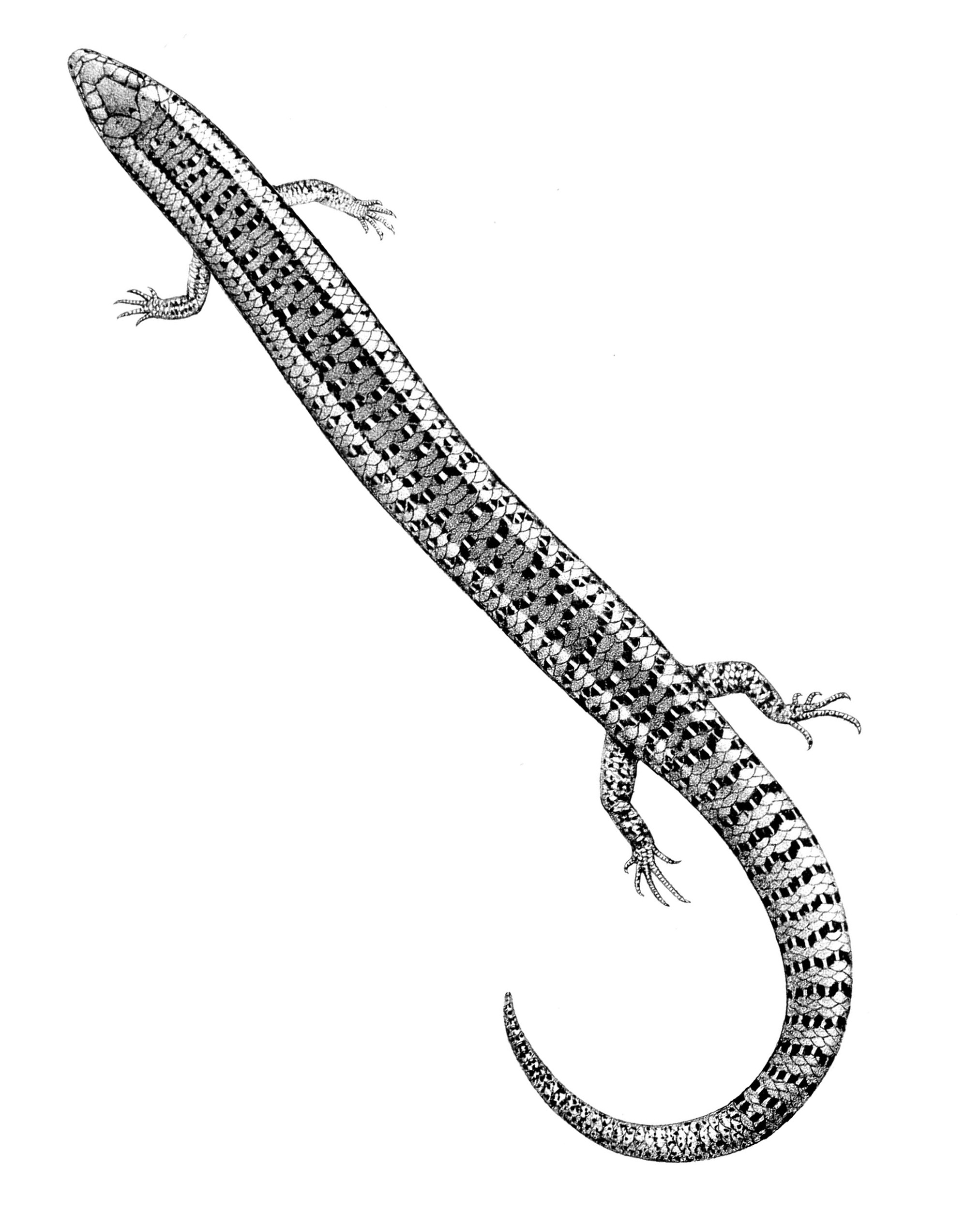

Conservation status
- Least Concern (IUCN 3.1)

Scientific classification
- Kingdom: Animalia
- Phylum: Chordata
- Class: Reptilia
- Order: Squamata
- Family: Scincidae
- Genus: Chalcides
- Species: C. bottegi

Binomial name
- Chalcides bottegi Boulenger, 1898

Synonyms
- Chalcides bottegi Boulenger, 1898; Chalcides ocellatus bottegi — Drewes, 1972; Chalcides ragazzii bottegi — G. Pasteur, 1981; Chalcides bottegi — Greenbaum et al., 2006

= Chalcides bottegi =

Species of lizard

Chalcides bottegi, also known commonly as Bottego's cylindrical skink or the ocellated skink, is a species of lizard in the family Scincidae. The species is native to East Africa, the Horn of Africa, and Northeast Africa.

== Etymology ==
The specific name, bottegi, is in honor of Italian explorer Vittorio Bottego.

== Geographic range ==
C. bottegi is found in Ethiopia, Kenya, South Sudan, and Sudan.

== Habitat ==
The preferred natural habitats of C. bottegi are savanna and forest, at altitudes of 300–500 m (980–1,640 ft).

== Description ==
Large for its genus, the holotype of C. bottegi has a snout-to-vent length (SVL) of 12.5 cm (4.9 in) and a regenerated tail.

== Behavior ==
C. bottegi is terrestrial, and it is probably diurnal.

== Reproduction ==
C. bottegi is viviparous.
