= Chalcides sphenopsiformis =

Conservation status
- Least Concern (IUCN 3.1)

Scientific classification
- Kingdom: Animalia
- Phylum: Chordata
- Class: Reptilia
- Order: Squamata
- Family: Scincidae
- Genus: Chalcides
- Species: C. sphenopsiformis

Binomial name
- Chalcides sphenopsiformis (Duméril, 1856)
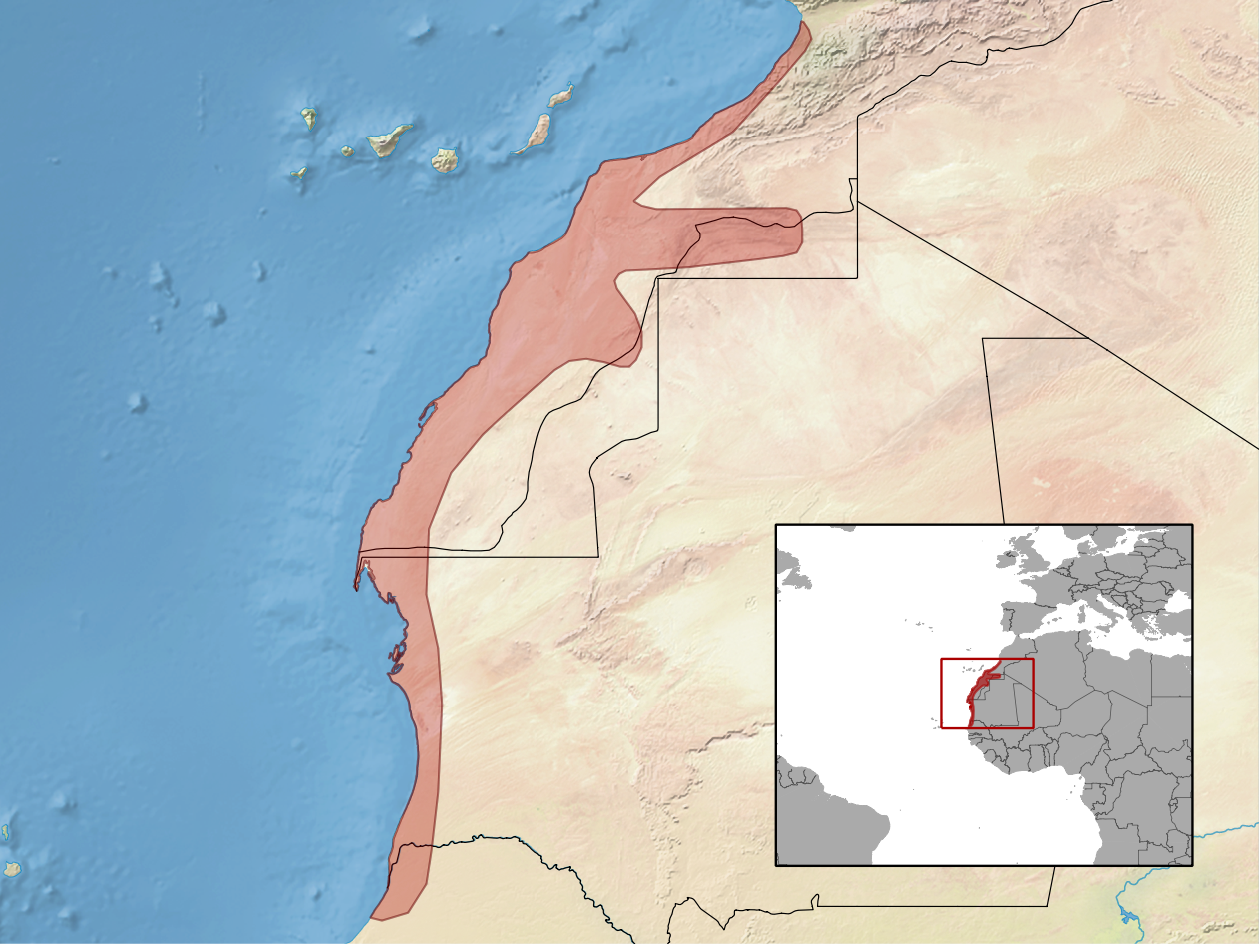

Species of lizard

Chalcides sphenopsiformis, or Duméril's wedge-snouted skink, is a species of lizard in the family Scincidae. The species is found in Morocco, Western Sahara, Mauritania, and Senegal.
