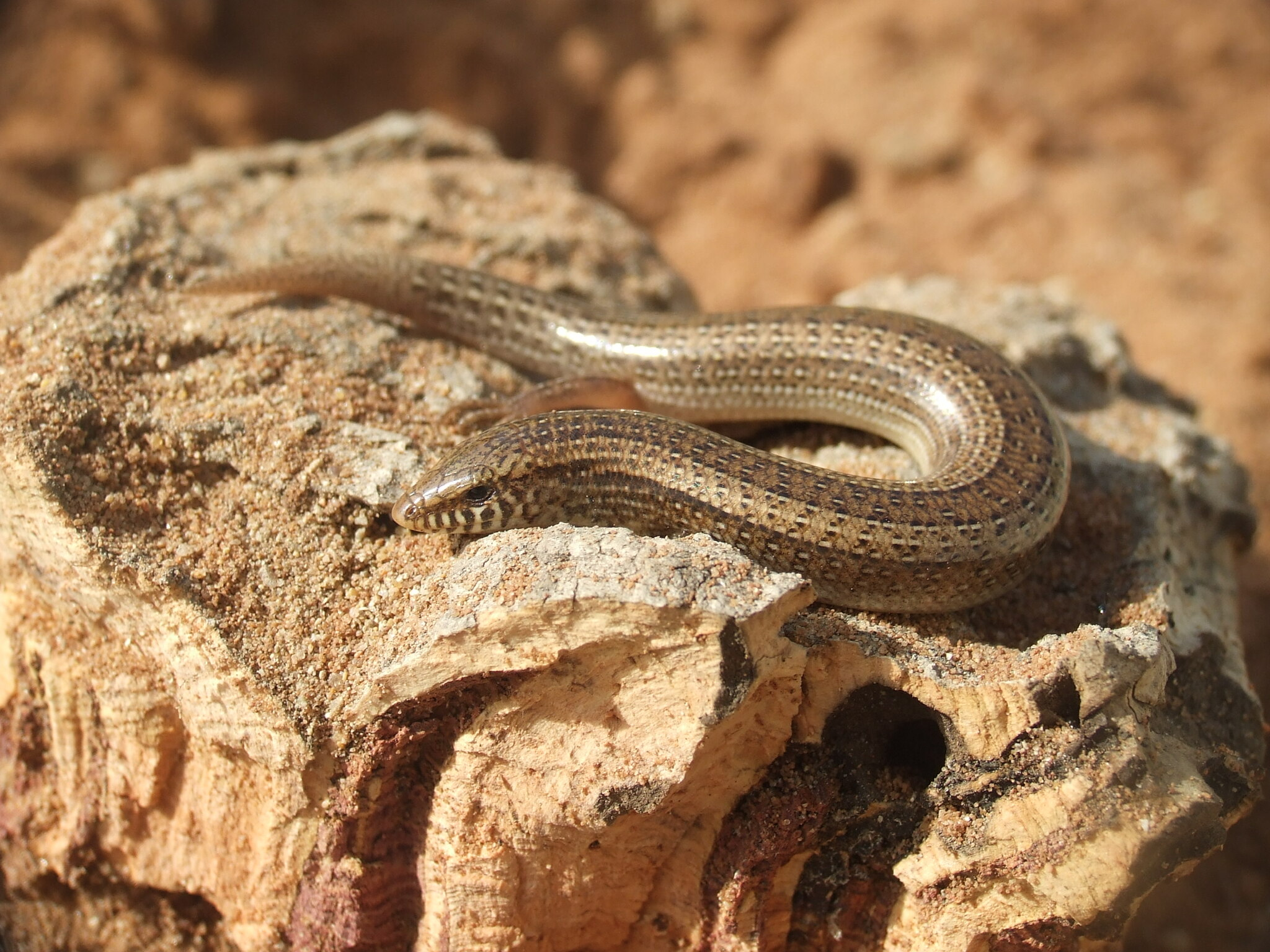
- Chalcides mionecton mionecton

Conservation status
- Least Concern (IUCN 3.1)

Scientific classification
- Kingdom: Animalia
- Phylum: Chordata
- Order: Squamata
- Family: Scincidae
- Genus: Chalcides
- Species: C. mionecton

Binomial name
- Chalcides mionecton (Boettger, 1874)
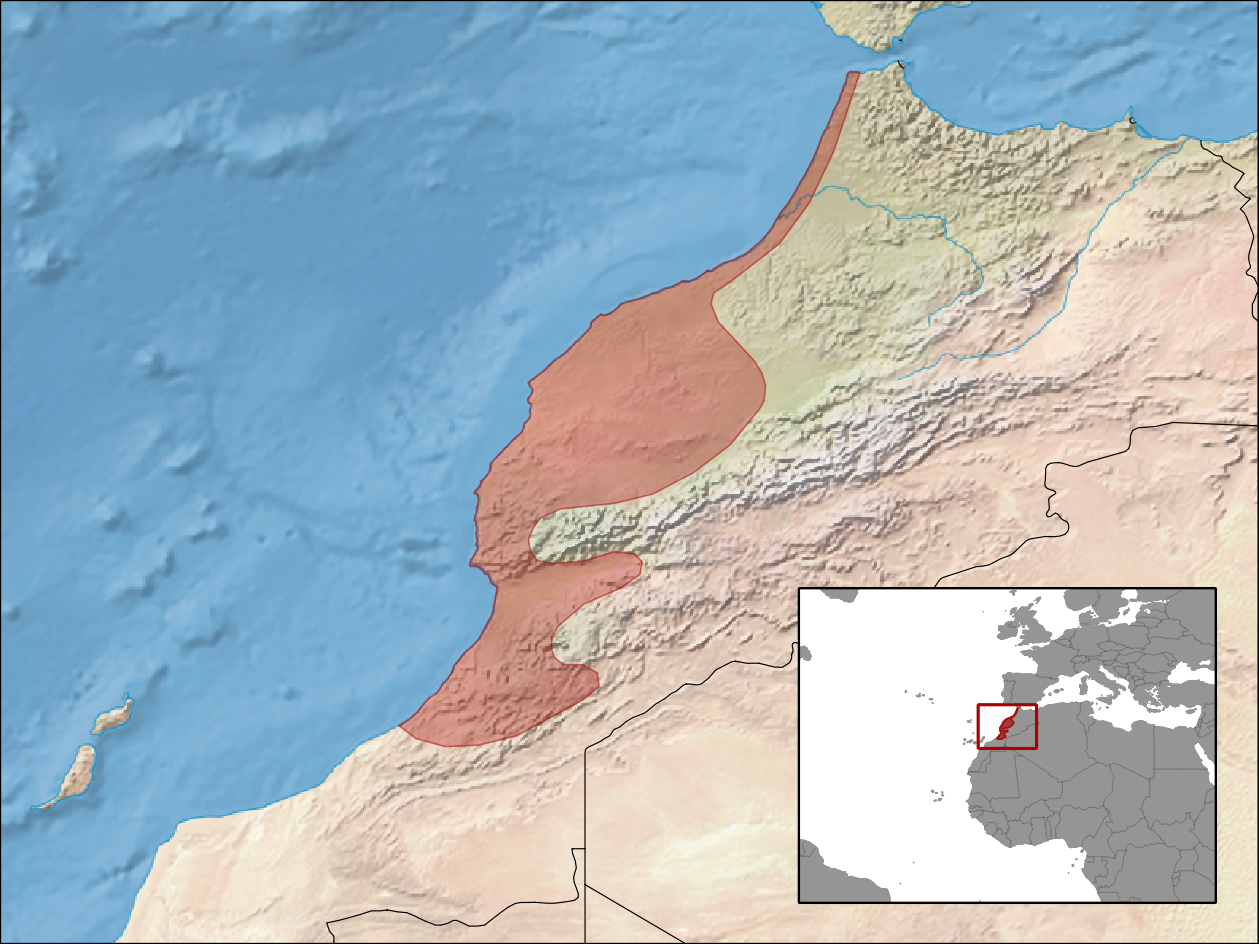

Synonyms
- Seps (Seps) mionecton Boettger, 1874

= Chalcides mionecton =

Species of lizard

Chalcides mionecton, the mionecton skink or Morocco cylindrical skink, is a species of skink in the family Scincidae. It is found only in Morocco.

There are two subspecies:

- Chalcides mionecton mionecton (Boettger, 1874)
- Chalcides mionecton trifasciatus Chabanaud, 1917

Genetic data suggest that these should be considered separate species, but they are not separable using external morphological characteristics.

Its natural habitats are sandy shores, arable land, pastureland, and rural gardens. It is threatened by habitat loss.
