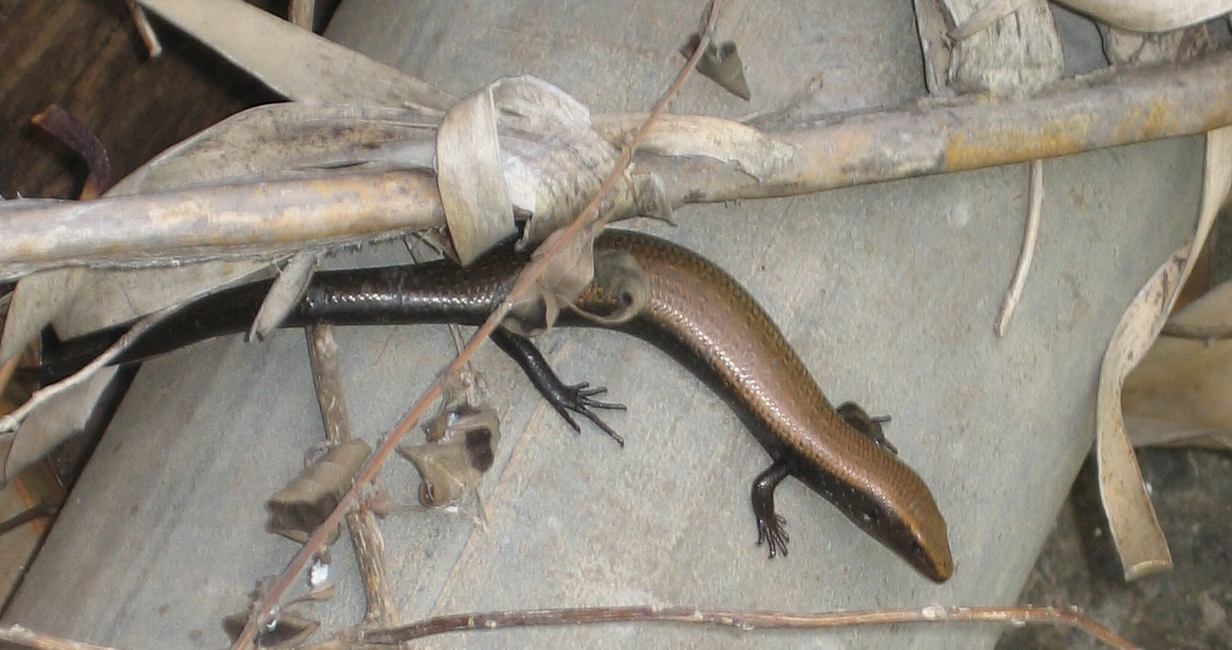

Conservation status
- Least Concern (IUCN 3.1)

Scientific classification
- Kingdom: Animalia
- Phylum: Chordata
- Class: Reptilia
- Order: Squamata
- Family: Scincidae
- Genus: Chalcides
- Species: C. viridanus

Binomial name
- Chalcides viridanus (Gravenhorst, 1851)
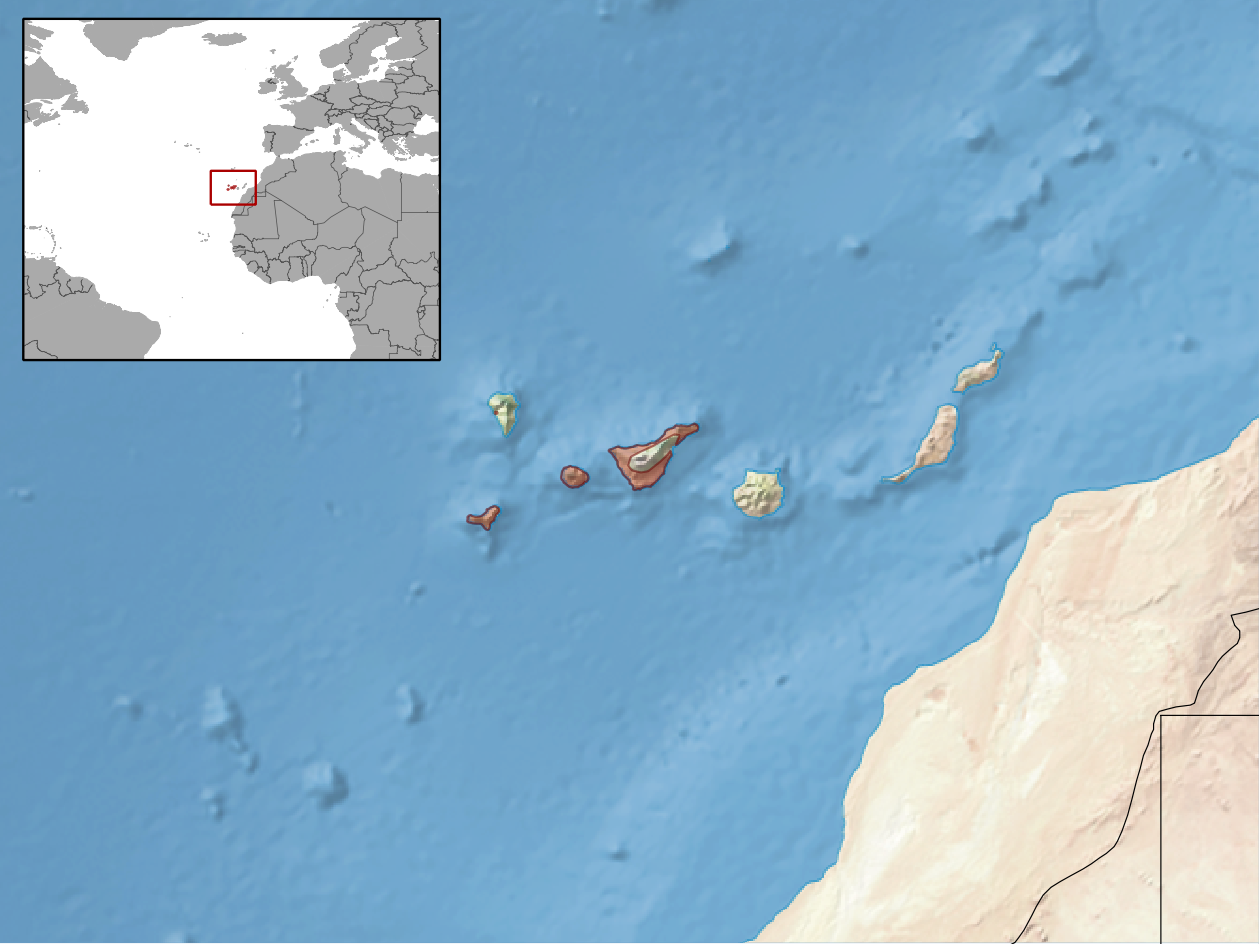

Synonyms
- Gongylus viridanus Gravenhorst, 1851; Chalcides viridanus — Boulenger, 1887

= West Canary skink =

Species of lizard

The West Canary skink (Chalcides viridanus), also known commonly as the Canaryan cylindrical skink, East Canary Islands skink, the Tenerife skink, is a species of lizard in the family Scincidae. The species is endemic to the Canary Islands.

== Habitat ==
The natural habitats of C. viridanus are temperate forest, temperate shrubland, subtropical or tropical dry shrubland, Mediterranean-type shrubby vegetation, temperate grassland, rocky areas, rocky shores, sandy shores, arable land, pastureland, rural gardens, and urban areas. It is found at altitudes up to 2,000 m (6,600 ft).

== Description ==
C. viridanus may reach a total length (including tail) of about 18 cm (7.1 in).

== Behavior ==
C. viridanus is active during the day and at dusk. Both its life in nature and its requirements in a terrarium are very similar to those of the Gran Canaria skink.

== Reproduction ==
C. viridanus is viviparous.

== Geographic range ==
C. viridianus is found on the following Canary Islands: Tenerife, El Hierro, Roque de Garachico, and Roques de Anaga.

== Sources ==
(listed chronologically)

- Brown RP, Thorpe RS, Báez M (1991). "Parallel within-island microevolution of lizards on neighbouring islands". Nature 352: 60–62.
- Brown RP, Thorpe RS, Báez M (1993). "Patterns and causes of morphological population differentiation in the Tenerife skink, Chalcides viridanus ". Biological Journal of the Linnean Society 50 (4): 313–328.
- Brown RP, Pestano J (1998). "Phylogeography of Canary Island skinks inferred from mtDNA sequences". Molecular Ecology 7: 1183–1191.
- Brown RP, Campos-Delgado R, Pestano J (2000). "Mitochondrial DNA evolution and population history of the Tenerife skink Chalcides viridanus ". Molecular Ecology 9: 1061–1069.
