= Chalcides delislei =

Conservation status
- Least Concern (IUCN 3.1)

Scientific classification
- Kingdom: Animalia
- Phylum: Chordata
- Class: Reptilia
- Order: Squamata
- Family: Scincidae
- Genus: Chalcides
- Species: C. delislei

Binomial name
- Chalcides delislei (Lataste & Rochebrune, 1876)

Synonyms
- Allodactylus de l'Islei Lataste & Rochebrune, 1876 in Lataste, 1876; Chalcides delislei — Boulenger, 1887; Sphenops delislei — Pappenfus, 1969; Chalcides delislei — Carranza et al., 2008

Species of lizard

Chalcides delislei, also known commonly as Delisle's wedge-snouted skink, is a species of lizard in the family Scincidae. The species is native to northern Africa.

== Etymology ==
The specific name, delislei, is in honor of French anthropologist Fernand Delisle.

== Geographic range ==
C. delislei is found in Algeria, Chad, Mali, Mauritania, Morocco, Niger, and Western Sahara.

== Habitat ==
The preferred natural habitats of C. delislei are desert and shrubland, at altitudes up to 700 m (2,300 ft).

== Behavior ==
C. delislei is diurnal, terrestrial, and fossorial.

== Diet ==
C. delislei preys upon small beetles and their larvae.

== Reproduction ==
C. delislei is viviparous.
