= Chalcides pulchellus =

Conservation status
- Least Concern (IUCN 3.1)

Scientific classification
- Kingdom: Animalia
- Phylum: Chordata
- Class: Reptilia
- Order: Squamata
- Suborder: Scinciformata
- Infraorder: Scincomorpha
- Family: Scincidae
- Genus: Chalcides
- Species: C. pulchellus

Binomial name
- Chalcides pulchellus Mocquard, 1906

Species of lizard

Chalcides pulchellus, Mocquard's cylindrical skink, is a species of skink that lives in southwestern Burkina Faso. Its Latin name means "pretty".
