= Chalcides boulengeri =

Conservation status
- Least Concern (IUCN 3.1)

Scientific classification
- Kingdom: Animalia
- Phylum: Chordata
- Class: Reptilia
- Order: Squamata
- Family: Scincidae
- Genus: Chalcides
- Species: C. boulengeri

Binomial name
- Chalcides boulengeri Anderson, 1892

Synonyms
- Chalcides boulengeri Anderson, 1892; Chalcides sepoides boulengeri — F. Werner, 1929; Chalcides boulengeri — Caputo et al., 1993; Sphenops boulengeri — Geniez et al., 2004; Chalcides (Sphenops) boulengeri — Kalboussi et al., 2006

Species of lizard

Chalcides boulengeri, also known commonly as Boulenger's feylinia and Boulenger's wedge-snouted skink, is a species of lizard in the family Scincidae. The species is native to the Maghreb region of North Africa.

== Etymology ==
The specific name, boulengeri, is in honor of Belgian-born British herpetologist George Albert Boulenger.

== Geographic range ==
C. boulengeri is found in Algeria, Libya, Morocco, Tunisia, and Western Sahara.

== Habitat ==
The preferred natural habitats of C. boulengeri are desert and shrubland.

== Reproduction ==
C. boulengeri is viviparous. Litter size is two neonates.
