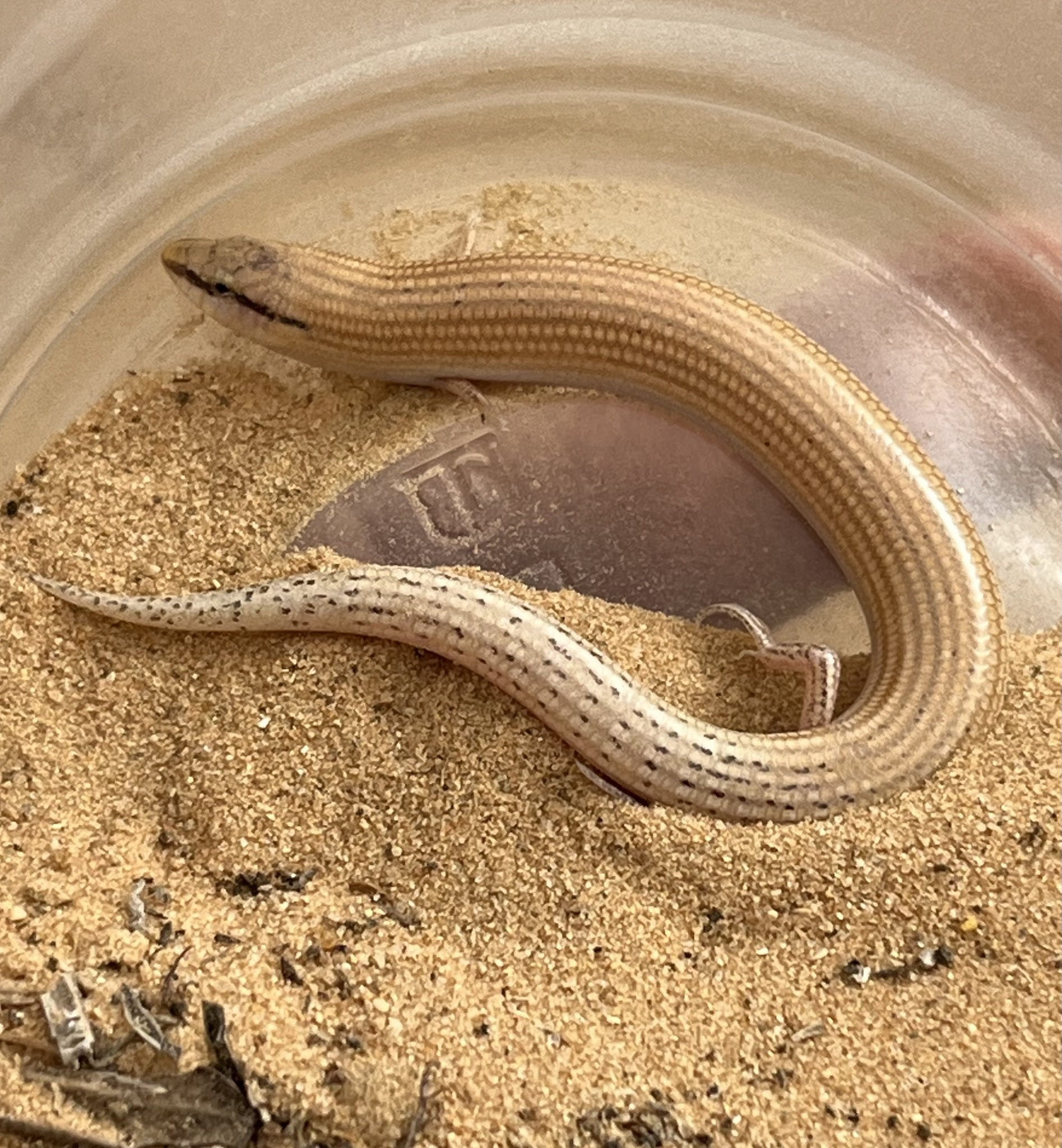
- Chalcides sepsoides in Israel

Conservation status
- Least Concern (IUCN 3.1)

Scientific classification
- Kingdom: Animalia
- Phylum: Chordata
- Class: Reptilia
- Order: Squamata
- Family: Scincidae
- Genus: Chalcides
- Species: C. sepsoides

Binomial name
- Chalcides sepsoides (Audouin, 1829)

Synonyms
- Sphenops sepsoides Audouin, 1829

= Chalcides sepsoides =

Wedge-snouted skink

Species of lizard

Chalcides sepsoides, the wedge-snouted skink, is a common and widespread species of skink in the family Scincidae. It is found in Tunisia, Libya, Egypt, Israel, Jordan, and the Palestinian territories.

== Ecology ==
S. sepsoides is a viviparous species. C. sepsoides is subarenaceous, and it moves very efficiently by "swimming" under the sand. In fact, it is rarely seen about the ground, and a common method of capturing specimens is to dig through sand dunes near the bases of bushes; this is because its main escape tactic is to dive into the sand. Its limbs are greatly reduced as an adaptation to this fossorial movement. As a result, it is often considered to be a sand specialist.

== Habitat and conservation ==
C. sepsoides occurs in sandy areas and dunes, including open steppe and bushland with sandy soil. It is nocturnal during the summer and diurnal during the winter.

It is a common species that can be locally threatened by habitat loss, overgrazing, and commercial collection, although none of these threats are considered to be very serious, and the species population is stable.
