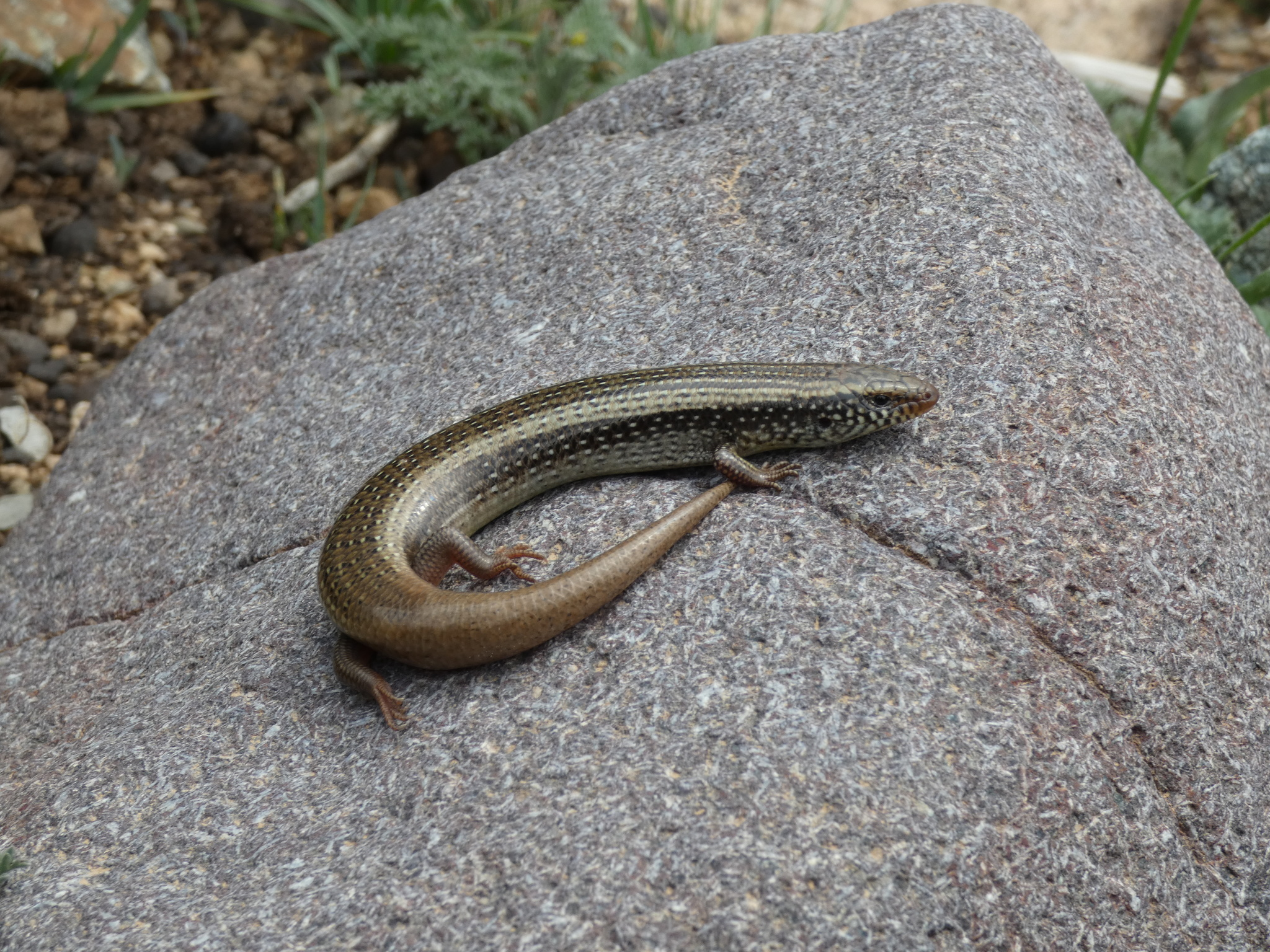

Conservation status
- Near Threatened (IUCN 3.1)

Scientific classification
- Kingdom: Animalia
- Phylum: Chordata
- Class: Reptilia
- Order: Squamata
- Family: Scincidae
- Genus: Chalcides
- Species: C. montanus

Binomial name
- Chalcides montanus Werner, 1931
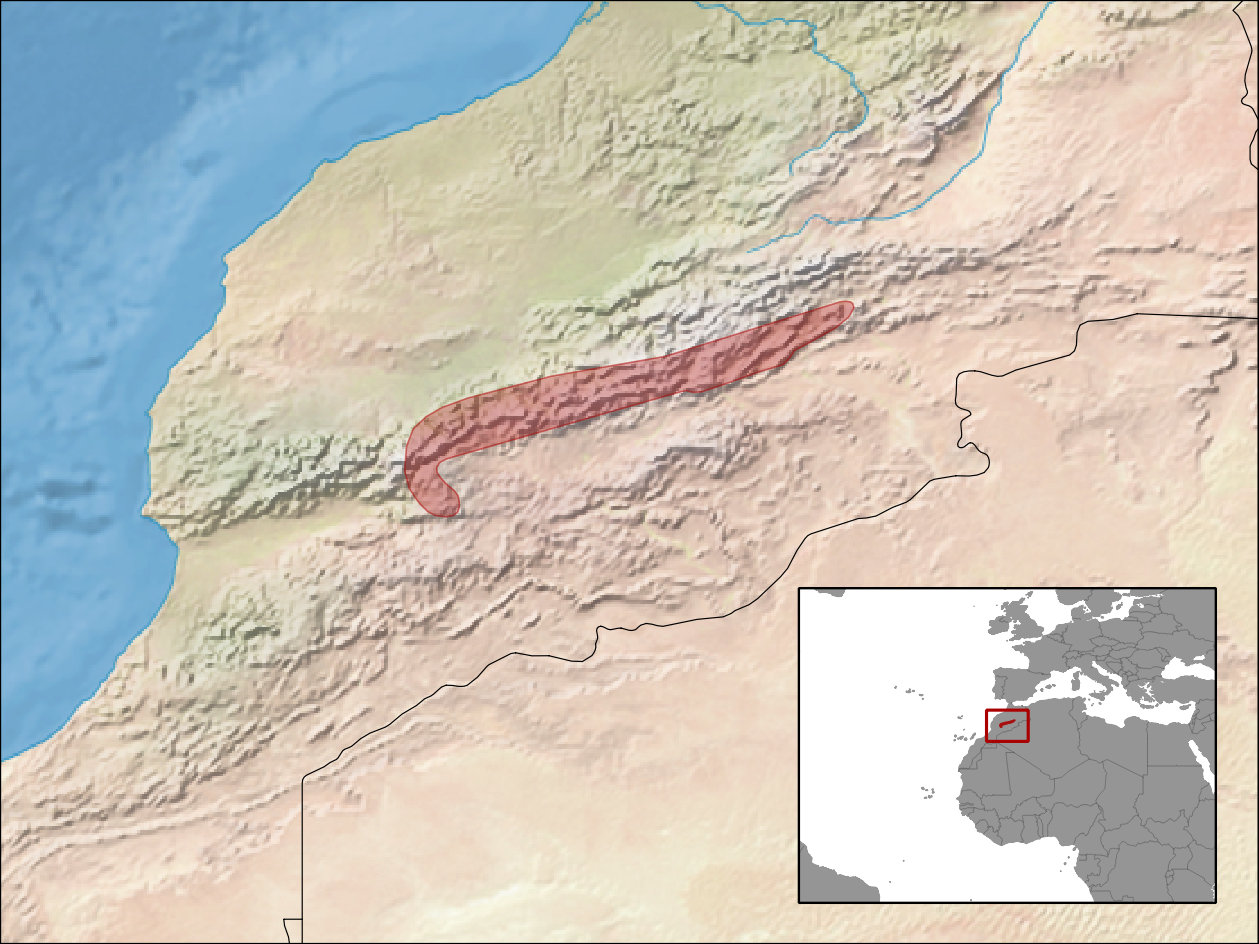

Synonyms
- Chalcides ocellatus montanus Werner, 1931

= Chalcides montanus =

Species of lizard

The Atlas Mountain skink (Chalcides montanus) is a species of skink endemic to the Atlas Mountains in Morocco. It was originally described as Chalcides ocellatus ssp. montanus.
