= Chalcides minutus =

Conservation status
- Vulnerable (IUCN 3.1)

Scientific classification
- Kingdom: Animalia
- Phylum: Chordata
- Class: Reptilia
- Order: Squamata
- Family: Scincidae
- Genus: Chalcides
- Species: C. minutus

Binomial name
- Chalcides minutus Caputo, 1993

Species of lizard

Chalcides minutus, or the small three-toed skink, is a species of skink found in northeastern Morocco, northwestern Algeria, and on the Spanish island of Melilla.

== Description ==
Chalcides minutus is the smallest species of its genus, reaching 115 mm (4.5 in) in snout–vent length. Females of the species give birth to live young through ovoviviparity.

== Taxonomy ==
Recent molecular studies have revealed that C. minutus could be a composite of species, with individuals from the type locality forming a long-independent lineage. Populations previously identified as Chalcides mertensi in the Théniet El Had National Park (Algeria) were found to be genetically closer to C. minutus, extending the known distribution of this lineage approximately 300 km (190 mi) to the east.

== Habitat and conservation ==
Chalcides minutus is locally common. It is most often found in damp, sunny forests or grasslands with thick vegetation, but it can also be found in relatively dry areas, and its population is most likely decreasing. It is threatened by overgrazing and habitat destruction due to encroaching agricultural interests.
