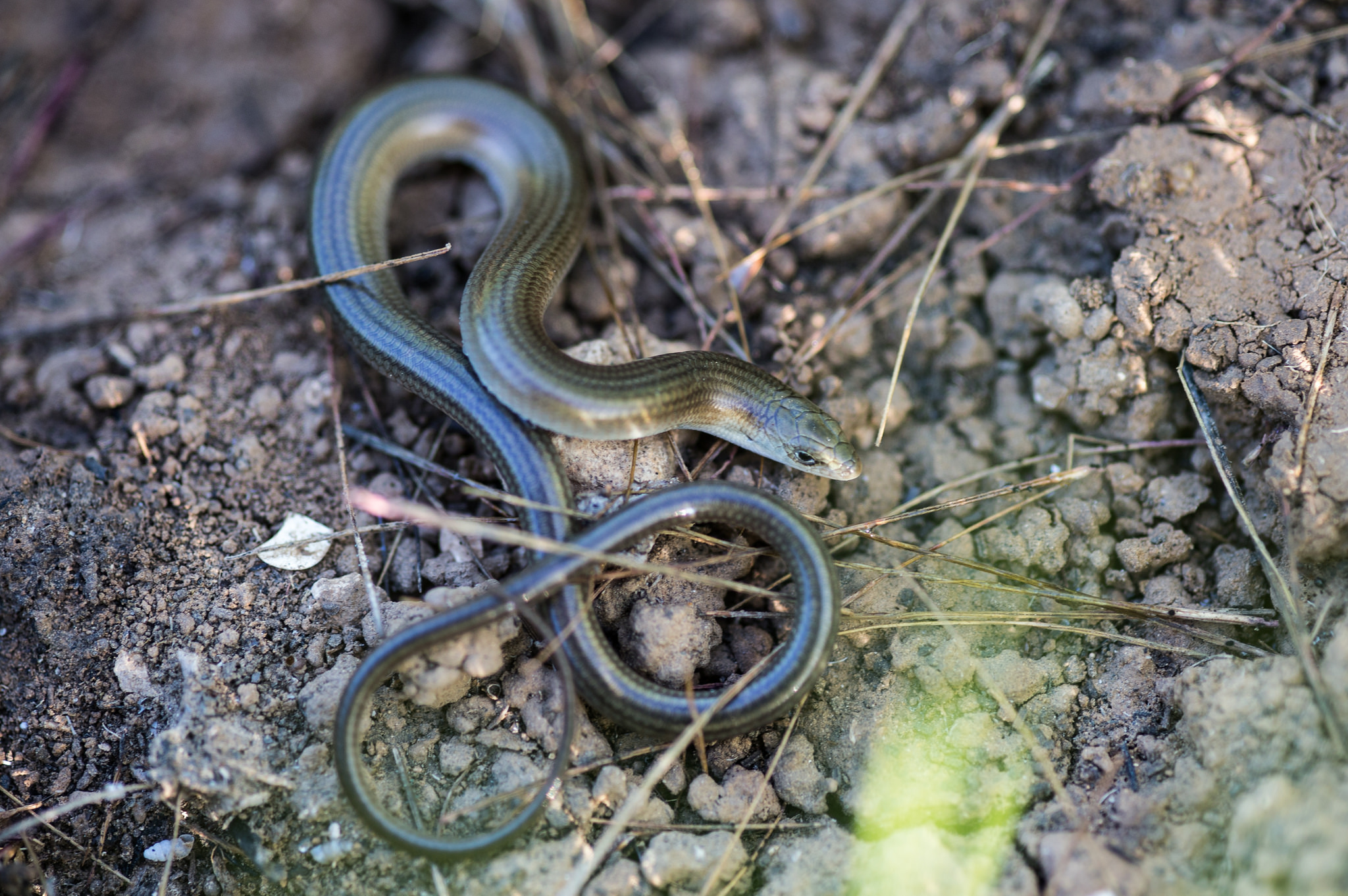

Conservation status
- Vulnerable (IUCN 3.1)

Scientific classification
- Kingdom: Animalia
- Phylum: Chordata
- Class: Reptilia
- Order: Squamata
- Family: Scincidae
- Genus: Chalcides
- Species: C. guentheri

Binomial name
- Chalcides guentheri Boulenger, 1887
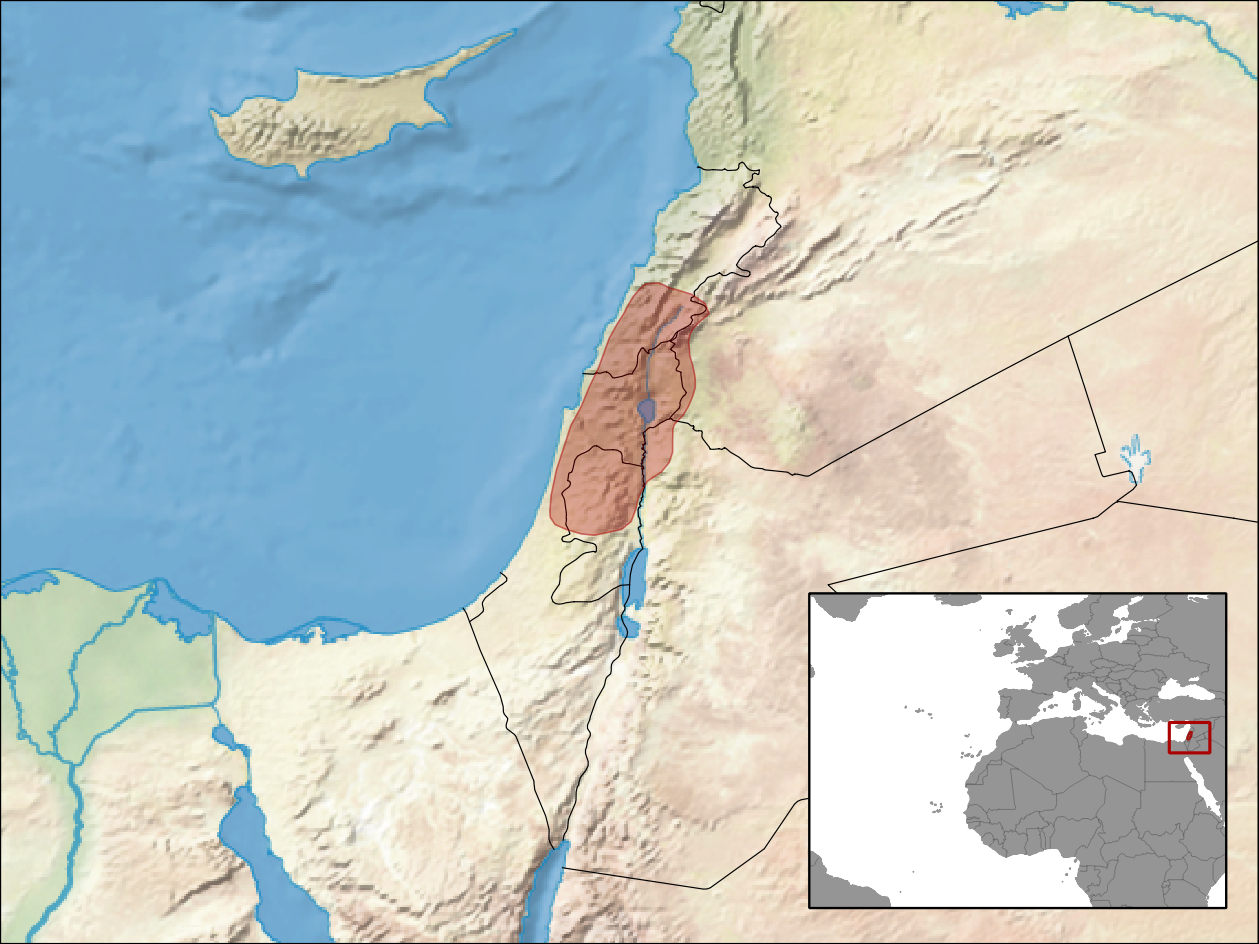

= Chalcides guentheri =

Species of lizard

Chalcides guentheri, also known commonly as Günther's cylindrical skink, is a species of skink, a lizard in the family Scincidae. The species is native to the Near East.

== Etymology ==
The specific name, guentheri, is in honor of German-born British herpetologist Albert Günther.

== Geographic range ==
C. guentheri is found in northern Israel, southern Lebanon, extreme northwestern Jordan, and extreme southwestern Syria.

== Description ==
C. guentheri has no limbs.

== Habitat ==
C. guentheri is usually found in wooded or shrubby areas and cannot live in modified habitats. Members of the species may be found burrowing in grasses.

== Reproduction ==
Sexually mature females of C. guentheri give birth to an average of three live young, by ovoviviparity.

== Conservation status ==
C. guentheri is suffering under major habitat loss as a result of agriculture in the area, and its population is in decline. It is protected by legislation in Israel.
