= Chalcides simonyi =

Conservation status
- Data Deficient (IUCN 3.1)

Scientific classification
- Kingdom: Animalia
- Phylum: Chordata
- Class: Reptilia
- Order: Squamata
- Family: Scincidae
- Genus: Chalcides
- Species: C. simonyi

Binomial name
- Chalcides simonyi (Steindachner, 1891)
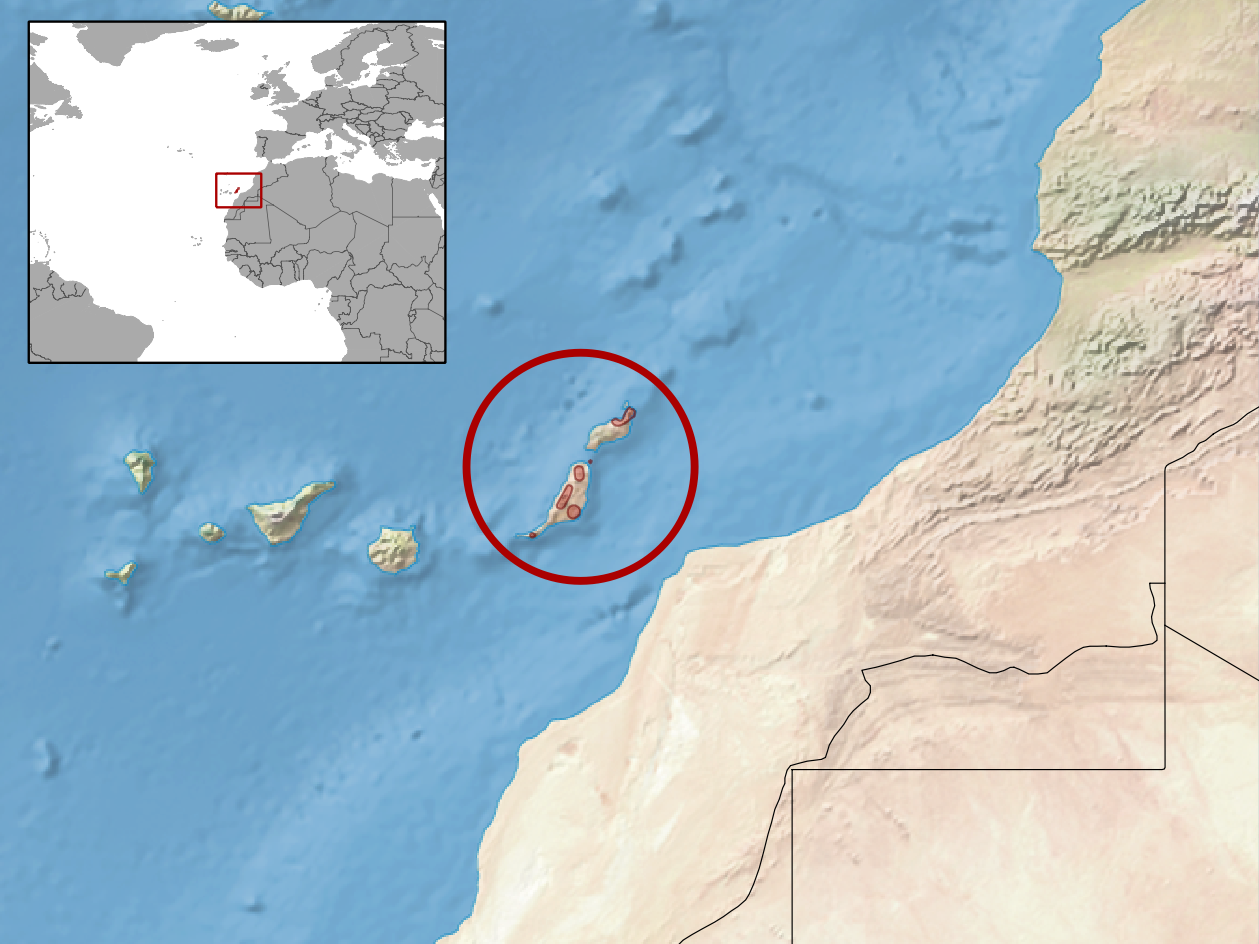

Synonyms
- Chalcides viridanus Gravenhorst, 1851; Chalcides polylepis simonyi Steindachner, 1891; Chalcides polylepis occidentalis Steindachner, 1900

Species of lizard

The Fuerteventura skink (Chalcides simonyi) is an endangered ovoviviparous species of skink in the family Scincidae. Skinks are generally characterized by their smaller legs and less pronounced necks compared to typical lizards.

== Etymology ==
The specific name, simonyi, is in honor of Viennese naturalist Oskar Simony (1852–1915), who also described El Hierro giant lizard in the same region.

== Geographic range ==
C. simonyi is found only on the islands of Fuerteventura and Lanzarote in the Canary Islands.

== Habitat ==
The natural habitats of C. simonyi are temperate shrubland, Mediterranean-type shrubby vegetation, temperate grassland, rocky areas, pastureland, and urban areas.
