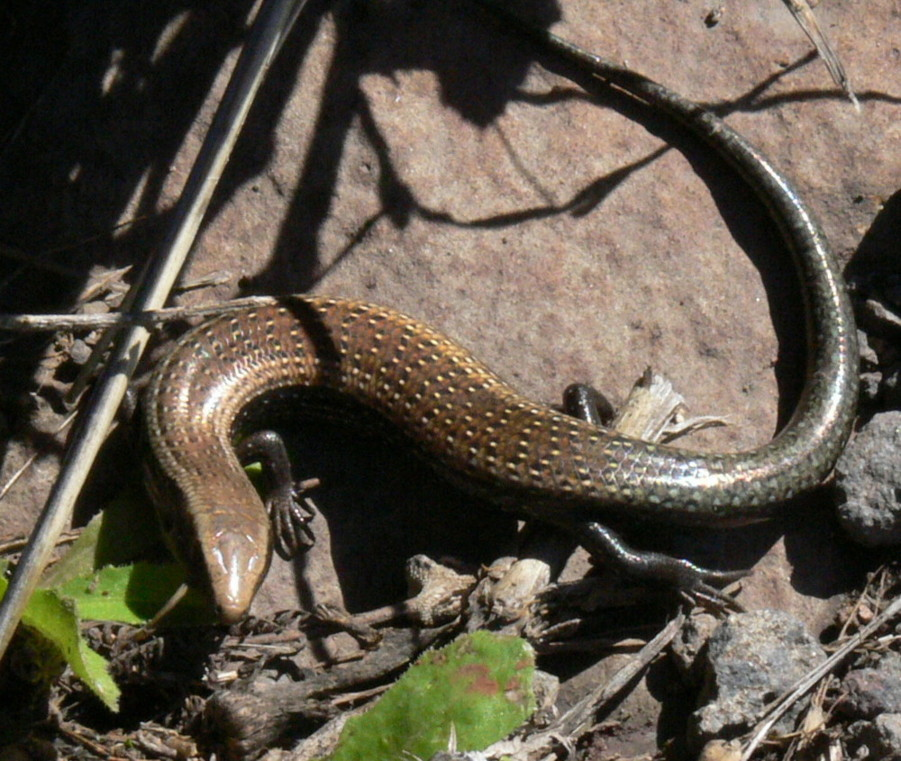

Scientific classification
- Kingdom: Animalia
- Phylum: Chordata
- Class: Reptilia
- Order: Squamata
- Family: Scincidae
- Genus: Chalcides
- Species: C. coeruleopunctatus

Binomial name
- Chalcides coeruleopunctatus Salvador, 1975

= Chalcides coeruleopunctatus =

Species of lizard

Chalcides coeruleopunctatus is a species of lizard in the family Scincidae. The species is found in the Canary Islands.
