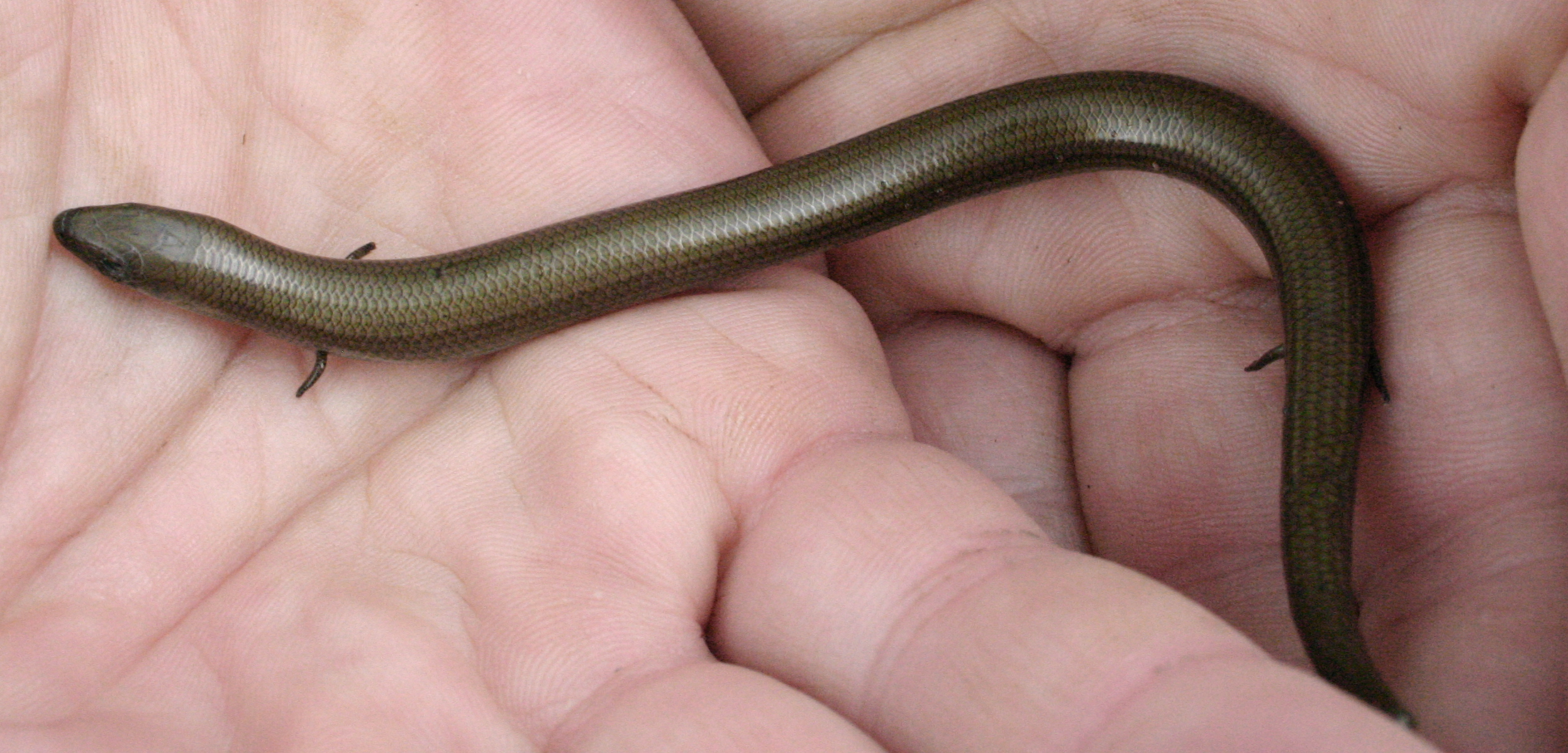

Conservation status
- Least Concern (IUCN 3.1)

Scientific classification
- Kingdom: Animalia
- Phylum: Chordata
- Class: Reptilia
- Order: Squamata
- Family: Scincidae
- Genus: Chalcides
- Species: C. chalcides

Binomial name
- Chalcides chalcides (Linnaeus, 1758)
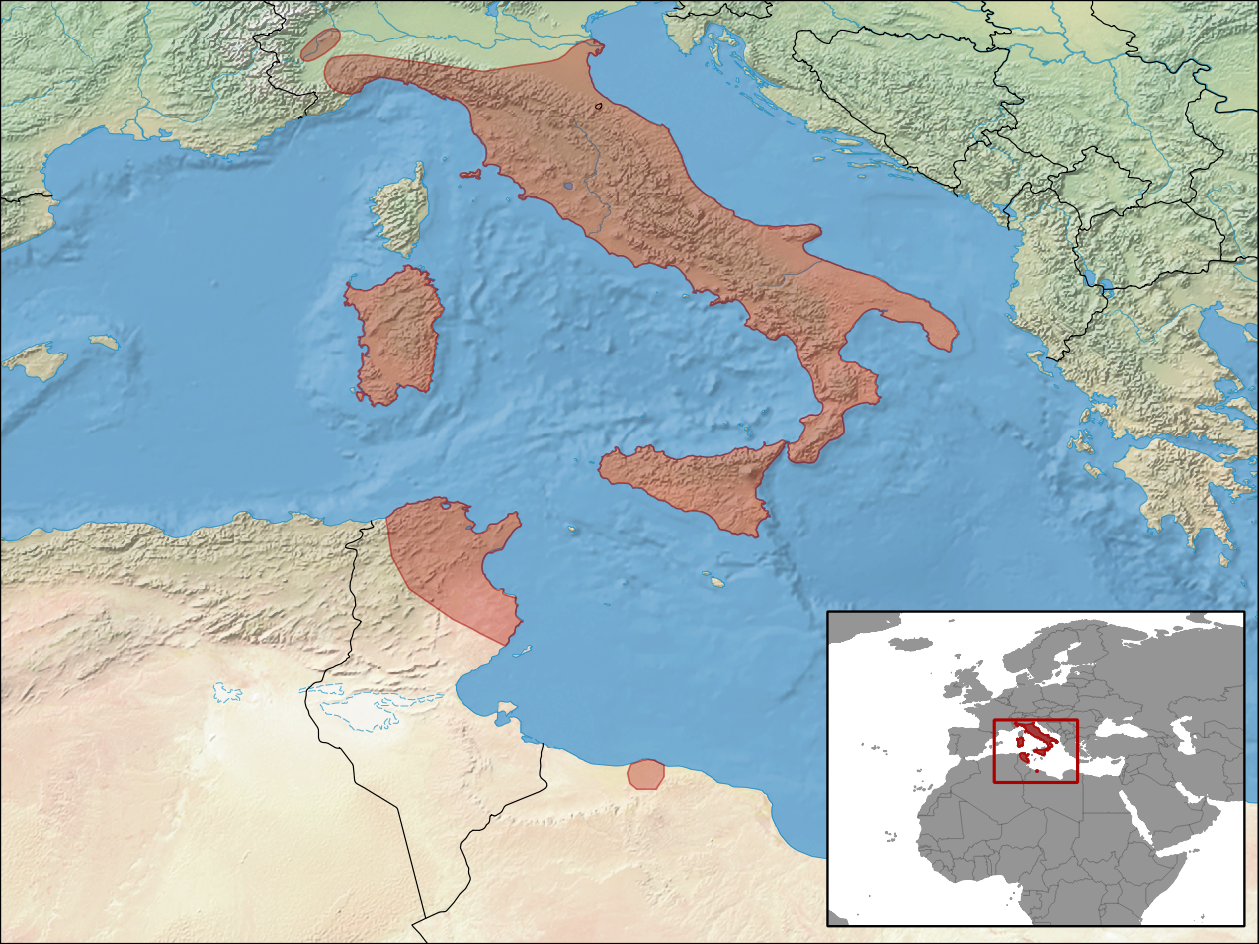

= Chalcides chalcides =

Italian three-toed skink

Species of reptile

The Italian three-toed skink or the cylindrical skink (Chalcides chalcides) is a species of lizard found from Italy (including Sicily, Sardinia and Elba), to northern Algeria, Libya, Morocco and Tunisia. They are commonly found in sunny areas with dense vegetation (usually grass up to 40 cm or 16 in of height) but can also be found in arid areas.

== Description ==
This skink superficially looks like a snake except for the possession of tiny limbs with three-toed feet, the middle toe of the hind foot being longer than the other two, a fact that differentiates it from the Western three-toed skink (Chalcides striatus). It has a small head and grows to a length of about 48 cm (19 in), more than half of which is tail. There are three different colour variants; Some are plain silvery-grey; some have four to six narrow lengthwise lines running along the body; some have an additional pale longitudinal, lateral band.

== Distribution and habitat ==
The Italian three-toed skink is native to Italy, where it is common south of the River Po, and including Sardinia, Elba and Sicily, and North Africa, where its range includes Morocco, Algeria, Tunisia and Libya. Its typical habitat is damp but sunny areas with dense low vegetation such as meadows, stream verges, marshes, grassy slopes and hedgerows. In upland areas it may inhabit drier, more arid areas with low scrub and degraded slopes. Its altitudinal range is from sea level to 2,077 m (6,814 ft).

== Status ==
The Italian three-toed skink is common in suitable habitats over much of its wide range. It is threatened by urbanization and the degradation of its habitat by coastal development, but it is tolerant of some degree of habitat modification. The IUCN has listed it as being of least concern because, although the population is probably declining, this is not at a fast enough rate to warrant listing it in a more threatened category.
