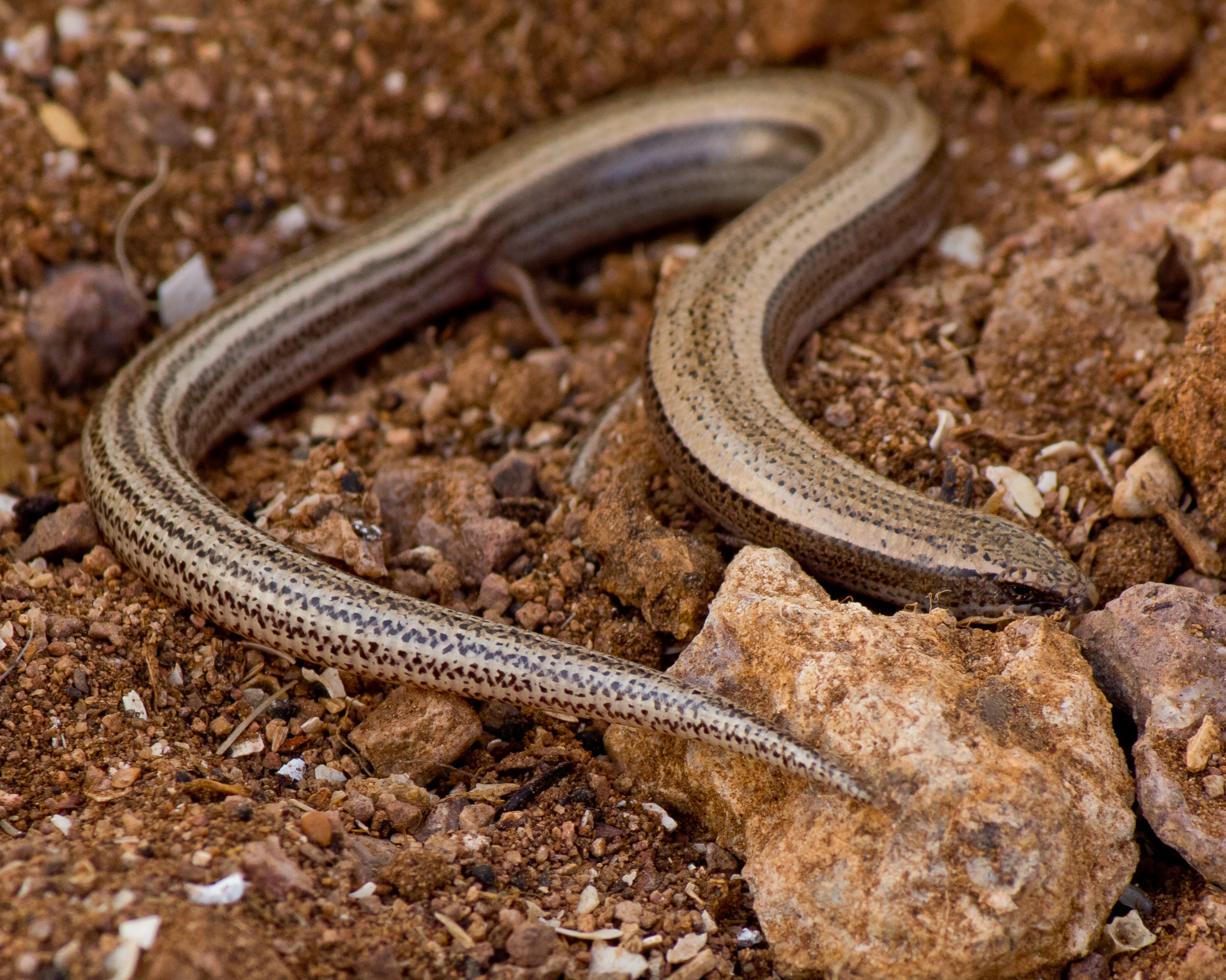

Conservation status
- Endangered (IUCN 3.1)

Scientific classification
- Kingdom: Animalia
- Phylum: Chordata
- Class: Reptilia
- Order: Squamata
- Suborder: Scinciformata
- Infraorder: Scincomorpha
- Family: Scincidae
- Genus: Chalcides
- Species: C. mauritanicus

Binomial name
- Chalcides mauritanicus Duméril & Bibron, 1839

= Chalcides mauritanicus =

Species of lizard

Chalcides mauritanicus, or the two-fingered skink, is an African species of skink found in Algeria and Morocco. It occurs in sandy areas and plantations, but cannot exist in severely modified habitats. It also requires good ground cover, but as this is becoming increasingly scarce, the species is declining. The distribution of the species is severely fragmented. Females of the species give birth to live young.
