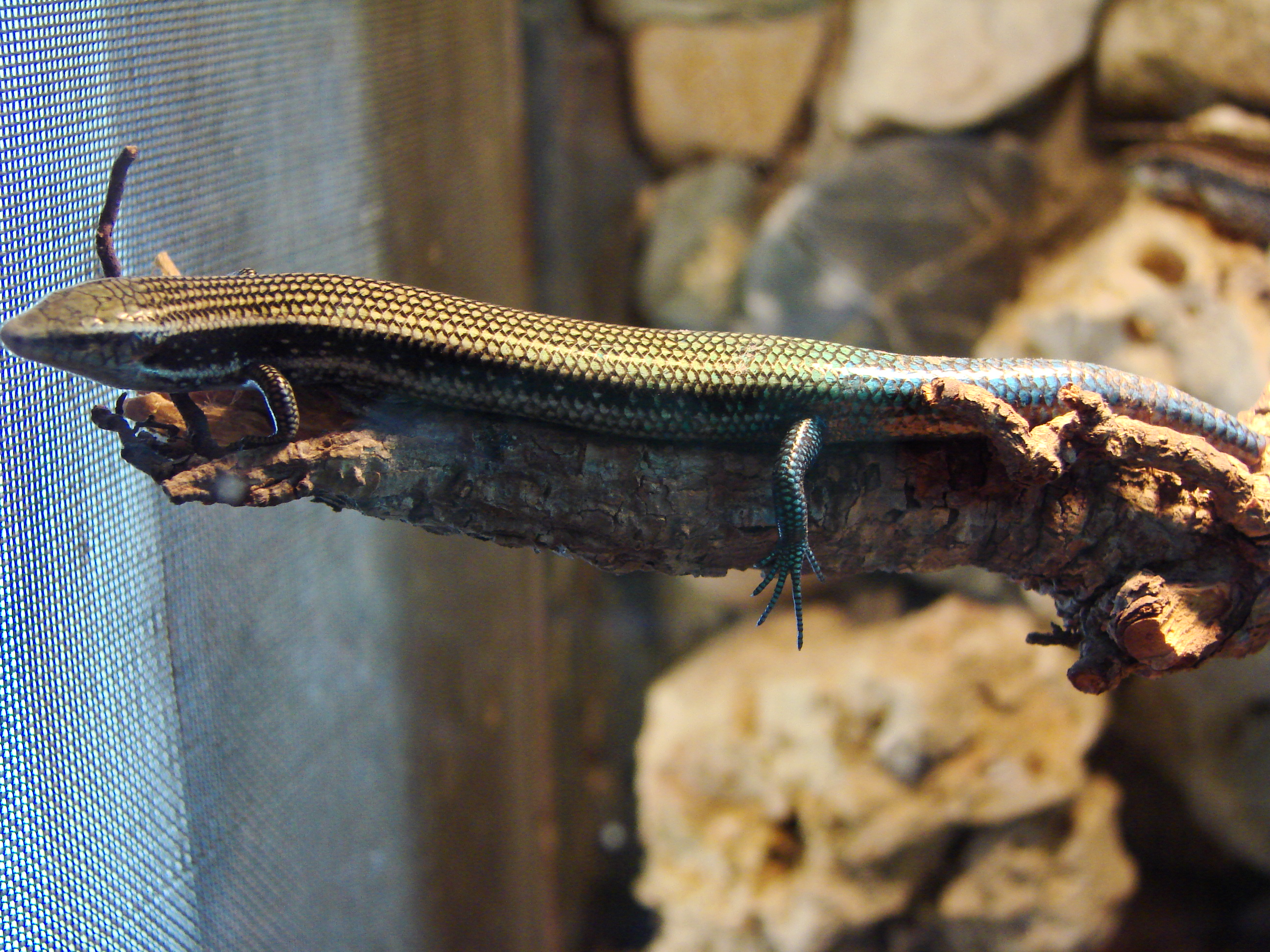

Conservation status
- Endangered (IUCN 3.1)

Scientific classification
- Kingdom: Animalia
- Phylum: Chordata
- Class: Reptilia
- Order: Squamata
- Family: Scincidae
- Genus: Chalcides
- Species: C. sexlineatus

Binomial name
- Chalcides sexlineatus Steindachner, 1891
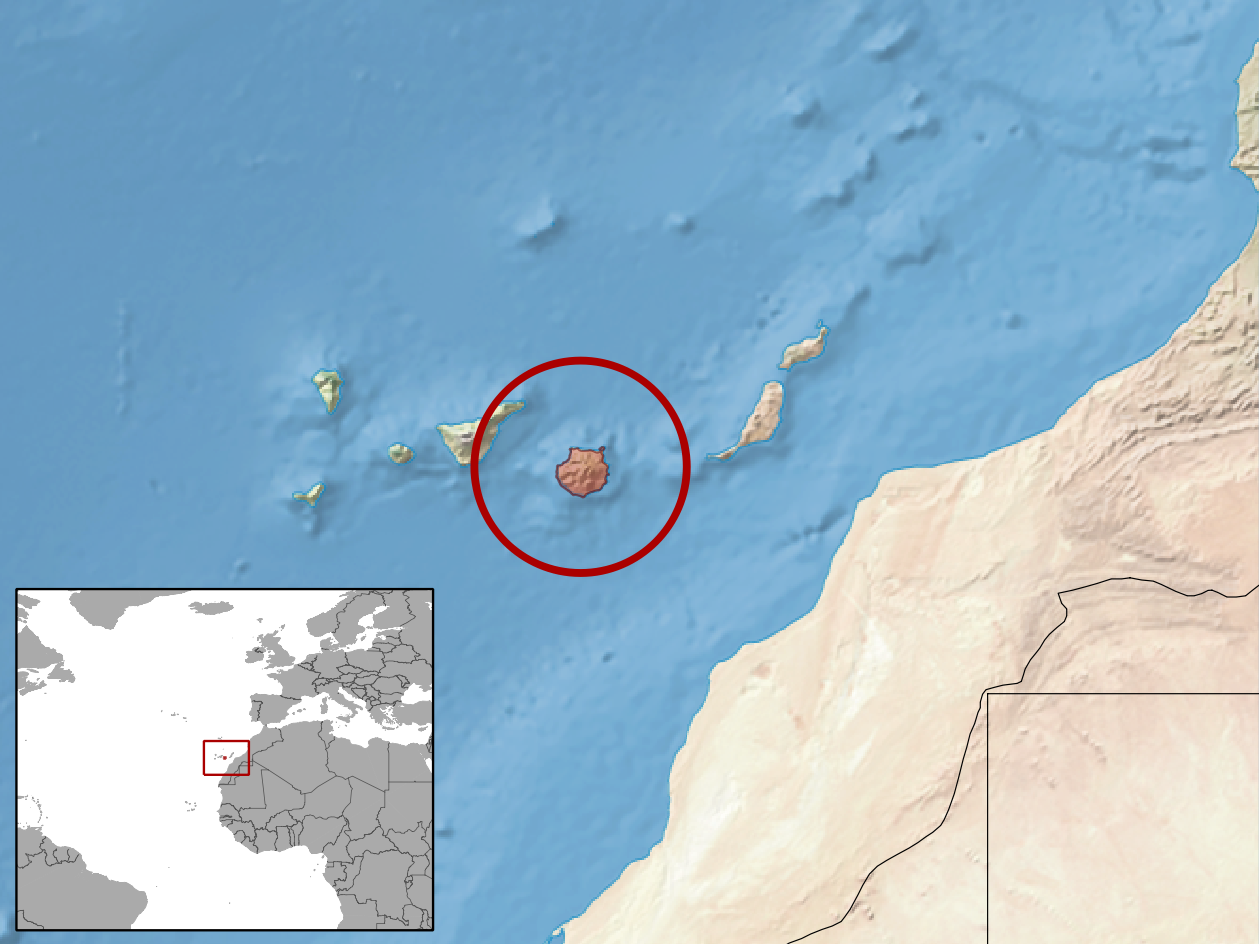

= Gran Canaria skink =

Species of lizard

The Gran Canaria skink (Chalcides sexlineatus) is a species of skink in the family Scincidae. It is endemic to Gran Canaria in the Canary Islands.

== Taxonomy ==
There are two recognized subspecies, C. sexlineatus sexlineatus occupying the southwestern half of the island, and C. sexlineatus bistriatus occupying the northeast.

The specific name sexlineatus, "six lines", refers to the distinct striping pattern.

== Geography ==
It is endemic to the island of Gran Canaria and the small islet Roque de Gando in the Canary Islands, Spain. It has also been introduced to the island of La Palma. It inhabits a wide altitudinal range, from the coast up to 1,850 meters above sea level.

The distinct morphological differences between the subspecies have been attributed to volcanic activity on the island in the past 2.8 million years.

== Description ==
The Gran Canaria skink has a flattened body and wide head, with strong legs that are longer in the north subspecies. The south subspecies has one phrenocular scale, while the north usually has two.

The average total body length is around 150mm (6 inches) including the tail, with females being a few millimeters longer on average. The species is slightly smaller in the south.

In the northeast, C. s. sexlineatus notably has a bright blue tail and light bluish belly. It has a black dorsolaetral band, separated from the side by a whitish or yellowish line. On the back there are four yellowish brown lines. In the southwest, C. s. bistriatus has a brown tail and white to yellowish belly. The back is brown with white spots arranged in a line down the body. On each side of the back there is a narrow light band. Intermediate populations between the north and south have a green tail.

== Habitat and ecology ==
It is abundant in nearly all habitats throughout Gran Canaria, from coastal areas, temperate forest and grassland, rocky peaks, and agricultural areas, though it is rarer in pine forests and the drier areas of the south.

They are ovoviviparous. Breeding occurs in July and August, and they give birth to 2–7 starting in September. The skinks are elusive and may be difficult to sight.

It feeds mainly on insect larvae and other small invertebrates.

== Conservation ==
In 2022, the IUCN Red List updated the Gran Canaria skink's status to Endangered. The reason for the listing is the recent introduction of the California kingsnake, which preys upon the skink. As of 2021, the kingsnake had spread to 50% of the island, with Chalcides sexlineatus populations decreased in areas where the snake occurred.

Feral cats and collection for the pet trade are also minor threats.

The species is protected under the EU Habitats Directive and the Bern Convention, and is listed under the Listado de Especies Silvestres en Régimen de Protección Especial (LESRPE) in Spain.
