= Chafarinas's skink =

Conservation status
- Endangered (IUCN 3.1)

Scientific classification
- Kingdom: Animalia
- Phylum: Chordata
- Class: Reptilia
- Order: Squamata
- Family: Scincidae
- Genus: Chalcides
- Species: C. parallelus

Binomial name
- Chalcides parallelus Doumergue, 1901

Species of reptile

Chafarinas's skink (Chalcides parallelus) is a species of skink in the family Scincidae. It is found in Algeria, Morocco, and Spain. Its natural habitats are Mediterranean-type shrubby vegetation, rocky areas, rocky shores, sandy shores, and plantations. It is threatened by habitat loss.
