= Moroccan three-toed skink =

Conservation status
- Near Threatened (IUCN 3.1)

Scientific classification
- Kingdom: Animalia
- Phylum: Chordata
- Class: Reptilia
- Order: Squamata
- Suborder: Scinciformata
- Infraorder: Scincomorpha
- Family: Scincidae
- Genus: Chalcides
- Species: C. pseudostriatus

Binomial name
- Chalcides pseudostriatus Caputo, 1993

Species of reptile

The Moroccan three-toed skink (Chalcides pseudostriatus) is a species of skink in the family Scincidae. It is found in Morocco and Spain. Its natural habitats are Mediterranean-type shrubby vegetation, temperate grassland, and rural gardens. It is threatened by habitat loss.
