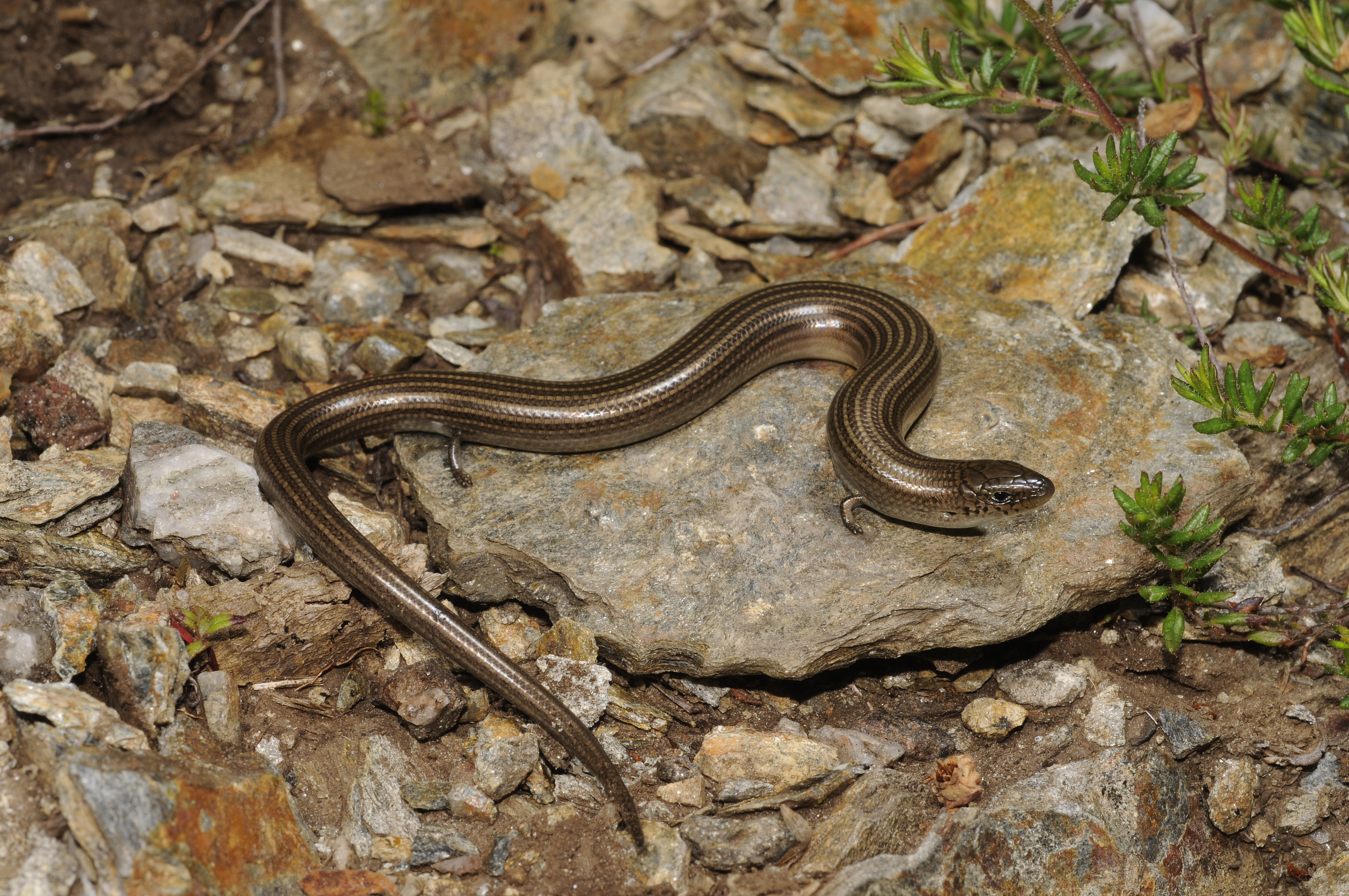

Conservation status
- Least Concern (IUCN 3.1)

Scientific classification
- Kingdom: Animalia
- Phylum: Chordata
- Class: Reptilia
- Order: Squamata
- Suborder: Scinciformata
- Infraorder: Scincomorpha
- Family: Scincidae
- Genus: Chalcides
- Species: C. striatus

Binomial name
- Chalcides striatus (Cuvier, 1829)

= Western three-toed skink =

Species of reptile

The western three-toed skink (Chalcides striatus) is a species of lizard with tiny legs in the family Scincidae. It is found in the Iberian Peninsula, southern France and parts of northwestern Italy. Its natural habitats are temperate forests, temperate shrubland, Mediterranean-type shrubby vegetation, temperate grassland, sandy shores, arable land, pastureland, and rural gardens. It was first described 1829 by the French naturalist Georges Cuvier. The generic name comes from the Greek "chalcides" meaning 'copper' and the specific name is derived from the Latin "striatus" meaning 'streak'.

== Description ==
This skink superficially looks like a snake except for the presence of two pairs of tiny, three-toed limbs. It has a small head and thick neck and grows to a length of about 43 cm (17 in). It is smooth and glossy, with a silvery or bronze colour with about ten slender longitudinal dark lines running along the body. The head is usually darker than the body. It can be distinguished from the very similar Italian three-toed skink (Chalcides chalcides) by the fact that its limbs are slightly larger than that species and the three toes of the hind feet are all the same length.

== Distribution and habitat ==
The western three-toed skink is native to southwestern parts of Europe. Its range includes Liguria in the extreme northwest of Italy, southern France, Spain and Portugal. It seems to be absent from eastern Spain and there is an isolated populations near Bordeaux in southwestern France. It occurs at elevations of up to 1,800 m (5,906 ft) above sea level. Its typical habitat is damp but sunny areas with dense low vegetation such as meadows, stream verges, marshes, grassy slopes and hedges. In the western part of its range, near the Atlantic Ocean, it may inhabit drier heathland with low scrub and gorse.

== Behaviour ==
The western three-toed skink can move only slowly using its tiny limbs but can also progress at a much greater speed by undulating its body from side to side in a snake-like fashion. It hibernates deep underground in the winter and emerges late in the spring. It is very secretive and when disturbed hides in dense vegetation, under stones or in pre-existing burrows. It feeds on a wide range of invertebrate prey.

Males gather during the breeding season and may fight or eat others. After a gestation period of two to three months, the female produces up to fifteen live young, each about 10 cm (4 in) at birth. The female sometimes dies during this process. The young attain maturity at age three or four.

== Status ==
The IUCN has listed the western three-toed skink as being of "Least Concern" because of its wide range and the fact that it is very common in some parts of its range. It is nevertheless threatened by changes in agricultural practices resulting in degradation of its habitat. In some areas it is persecuted because it is mistakenly thought to be venomous.
