= Georges Pasteur =

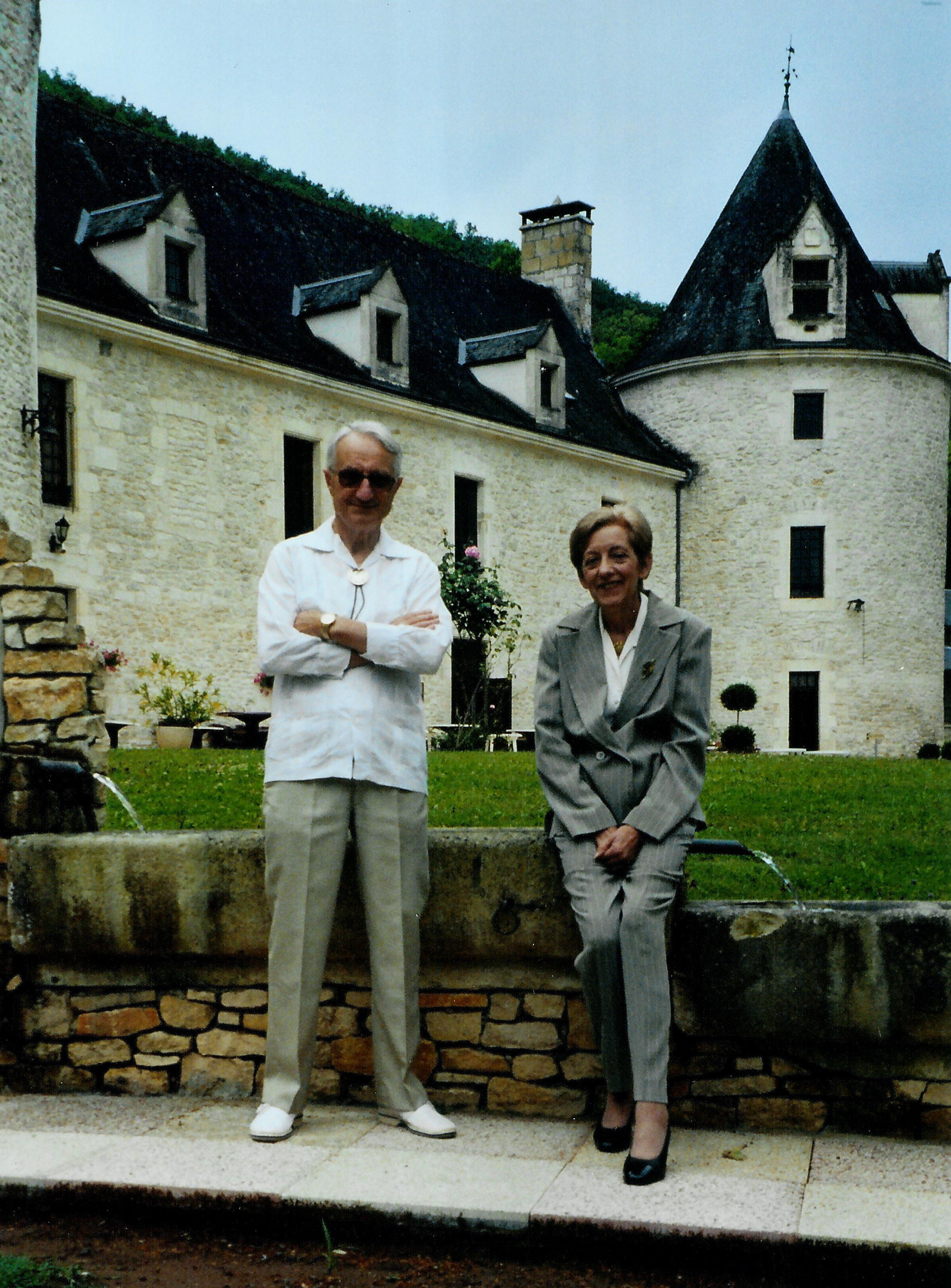
Georges and Nicole Pasteur
