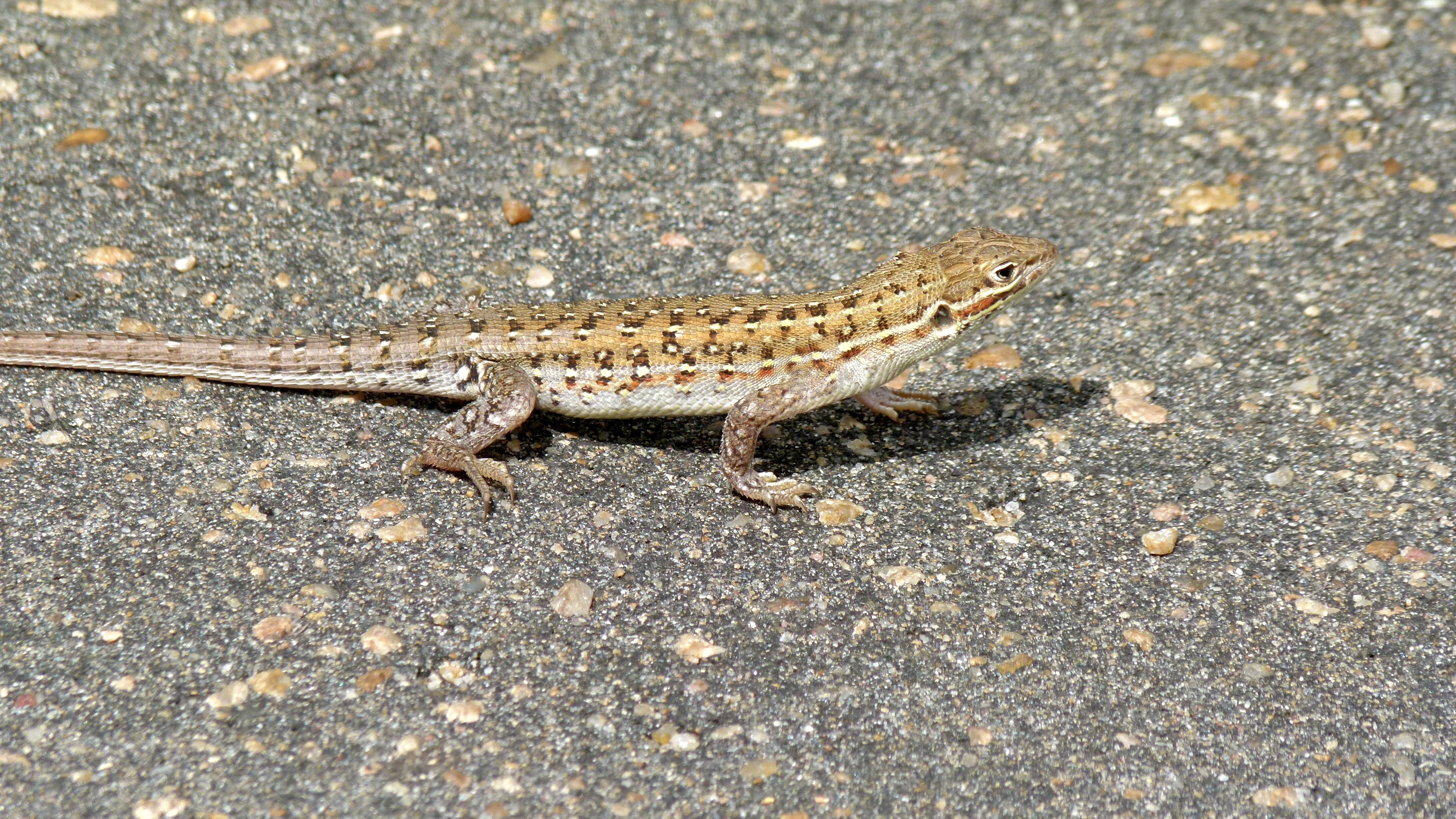

Scientific classification
- Domain: Eukaryota
- Kingdom: Animalia
- Phylum: Chordata
- Class: Reptilia
- Order: Squamata
- Family: Lacertidae
- Genus: Meroles
- Species: M. squamulosus

Binomial name
- Meroles squamulosus (Peters, 1854)

Synonyms
- Ichnotropis squamulosa Peters, 1854

= Common rough-scaled lizard =

Species of lizard

Meroles squamulosa is a species of African lizard originally placed in the genus Ichnotropis, however phylogenetic evidence moves this species to the genus Meroles. The species is commonly called the common rough-scaled lizard or savanna lizard. It is largely found in southern Africa. These lizards are terrestrial and found in the range of mesic savannah. The common rough-scaled lizard is medium in size and well distributed in parts of Namibia, Botswana, Zimbabwe, Angola, Tanzania, and Zambia.

== Description ==
Common rough-scaled lizards are medium-sized lizards each with a small head, body, and a long tail. The frontonasal is divided and has small body scales in 42 to 58 rows at the midline. The backs of these lizards are brownish grey with narrow dark blotches and rows of pale spots.

Unlike the Ichnotropis species, M. squamulosus does not have subocular scales bordering the lip.

== Habitat ==
These lizards can be found in semi-arid, shrub savannas in Africa such as Ngamiland, Botswana. They dig branching burrows in the soft sand usually at the base of Acacia trees that may be shared with several individuals.

== Biology ==
These lizards are insectivorous and actively hunt during the day feeding on termites, grasshoppers, beetles and other small insects. They seem to have a sympatric relationship with Ichnotropis capensis as their mating season alternates so they do not compete for the same resources.

=== Taxonomy and evolution ===
Based on morphological evidence, the South African Ichnotropis capensis and the North American genus Psammodromus diverged from the lineage of Lacerta lepida and Lacerta monticola during the Oligocene epoch (24 to 36 million years ago).

Since 1854, the common rough-scaled sand lizard was classified under the genus Ichnotropis, determined through morphological characteristics. More recent molecular phylogenetic analysis of mitochondrial DNA and nuclear DNA markers determined that it did not group with Ichnotropis, but with the genus Meroles. Morphological traits can change over time influenced by factors such as microhabitat and environment or a combination of factors. Phylogenetic evidence of the common rough-scaled sand lizard was found in 2007, but was not accepted due to incomplete taxon sampling for Ichnotropis.

=== Mating ===
This lizard has a life expectancy of 8 to 9 months. The males have a symmetrical armatured hemipenes which only one is used at a time. The males and females have 11 to 18 femoral pores on each thigh of which pheramones are commonly excreted. The females lays 8 to 12 eggs around April or May and hatchlings appear from October through November. The long incubation period is due to the cold conditions of winter. Growth is rapid as these lizards reach sexual maturity in 4 to 5 months.

=== Helminths ===
M. squamulosus is one of 8 genera of lizards in southern Africa that have been reported to harbor helminths These helminths have a paratenic relationship with these lizards using them to transport and infect others.
