= Ichnotropis grandiceps =

Conservation status
- Least Concern (IUCN 3.1)

Scientific classification
- Kingdom: Animalia
- Phylum: Chordata
- Class: Reptilia
- Order: Squamata
- Suborder: Lacertoidea
- Family: Lacertidae
- Genus: Ichnotropis
- Species: I. grandiceps

Binomial name
- Ichnotropis grandiceps Broadley, 1967

Species of lizard

Ichnotropis grandiceps is a species of African lizards in the family Lacertidae. They are commonly called Caprivi rough-scaled lizards as they are largely found in southwestern Africa on the border of the Caprivi Strip. The cape rough-scaled lizards are terrestrial and found in the range of open woodland and mesic savanna. The caprivi rough-scaled lizards are medium in size and distributed in parts of Namibia and Botswana. This species is on the International Union for Conservation of Nature's Red List for endangered species as they are rare and has not been seen or collected since 1998. Data about the population or specimens collected are needed for the IUCN to obtain more information about the unknown threats that may be impacting them.

== Description ==
I. grandiceps are medium-sized lizards with slender bodies, long tails, and well developed legs. They are very similar to the type species Ichnotropis capensis, except I. grandiceps have larger heads. These lizards are no more than 70 mm in snout to vent length (SVL).

Identification of Ichnotropis includes the following:

- Cylindrical tail without lateral fringe
- Toes without serrated or fringed edge
- Smooth or tubular lamellae under toes
- Subocular scales bordering lip
- No collar present
- Keeled or overlapping dorsal scales
- Head shields smooth or slightly rough

The coloration of the adults consist of a uniform grey and yellowish brown backs with few scattered dark spots. A dark dorsolateral stripe that may be absent or faint, which runs from the head to the groin and breaks up into a line of lateral spots. The sides of the head and the belly are white. The juveniles have pale grey and brown backs with lateral stripes.

== Habitat ==
I. grandiceps can be found in open woodland, lime soil, or white sandy areas in Southwestern Africa. There are records that report this species in Namibia, and Botswana. These lizards seek shelter in soft soiled burrows, under rocks and brush.

== Biology ==
These lizards are insectivorous and feed on termites and other small insects. They are active hunters during the day. This species is rare and have not been collected in some time.

=== Taxonomy and evolution ===
Based on morphological evidence the South African genus Ichnotropis and the North American genus Psammodromus diverged from a common ancestor from the lineage of Lacerta lepida and Lacerta monticola during the Oligocene epoch (24 to 36 million years ago).
