= Ichnotropis microlepidota =

Conservation status
- Least Concern (IUCN 3.1)

Scientific classification
- Kingdom: Animalia
- Phylum: Chordata
- Class: Reptilia
- Order: Squamata
- Family: Lacertidae
- Genus: Ichnotropis
- Species: I. microlepidota

Binomial name
- Ichnotropis microlepidota Marx, 1956

Species of lizard

Ichnotropis microlepidota is a species of African lizard in the family Lacertidae. It is commonly called Marx's rough-scaled lizard and is endemic to Angola. I. microlepidota is a terrestrial lizard and was first discovered at the foot of Mount Moco.

== Description ==
I. microlepidota is a medium-sized lizard with a slender body, long tail, and well developed legs. Most of the specimens found are less than 52 mm (2.0 in) long in snout–to-vent length (SVL) and share the common characteristics of the genus Ichnotropis:

- Cylindrical tail without lateral fringe
- Toes without serrated or fringed edge
- Smooth or tubular lamellae under toes
- Subocular scales bordering lip
- No collar present
- Keeled or overlapping dorsal scales
- Head shields smooth or slightly rough

I. microlepidota is similar to Ichnotropis bivittata except I. microlepidota has a wider body.

== Biology ==
I. microlepidota is insectivorous and feeds on termites and other small insects. It is an active hunter during the day.

=== Taxonomy and evolution ===
Based on morphological evidence, the South African genus Ichnotropis and the North American genus Psammodromus diverged from the lineage of Lacerta lepida and Lacerta monticola during the Oligocene epoch (24 to 36 million years ago).

=== Predators ===
I. microlepidota has been recorded as prey of Melierax metabates, the chanting goshawk, a bird of prey indigenous to Africa.
