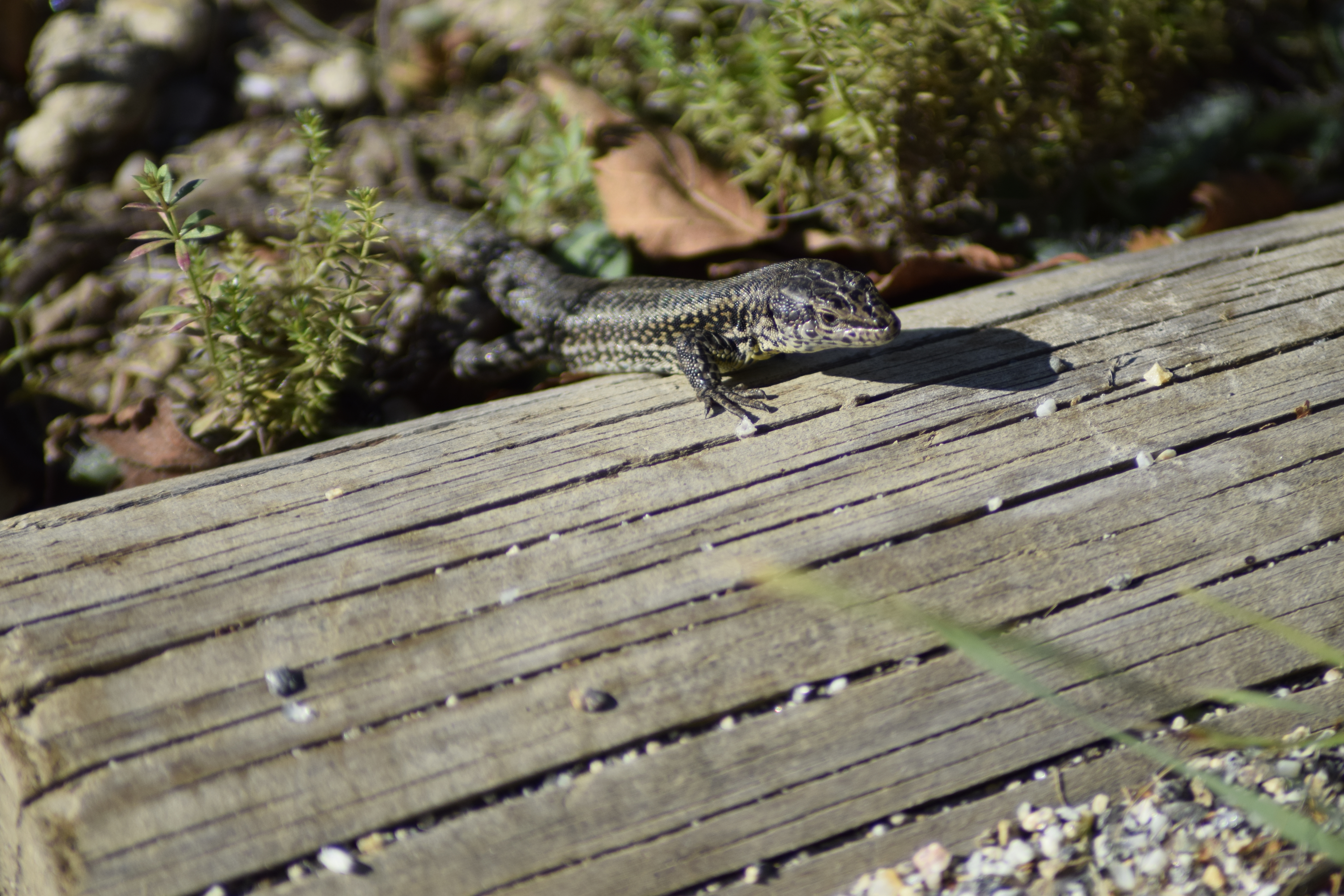

Scientific classification
- Domain: Eukaryota
- Kingdom: Animalia
- Phylum: Chordata
- Class: Reptilia
- Order: Squamata
- Family: Lacertidae
- Genus: Psammodromus
- Species: P. occidentalis

Binomial name
- Psammodromus occidentalis Fitze, Gonzalez-Jimena, San Jose, San Mauro, & Zardoya, 2012

= Psammodromus occidentalis =

Species of lizard

Psammodromus occidentalis is a species of lizards in the family Lacertidae. It is endemic to Western Iberian Peninsula (western Spain and Portugal). Before being described as a distinct species in 2012, it was considered as the western lineage of P. hispanicus.
