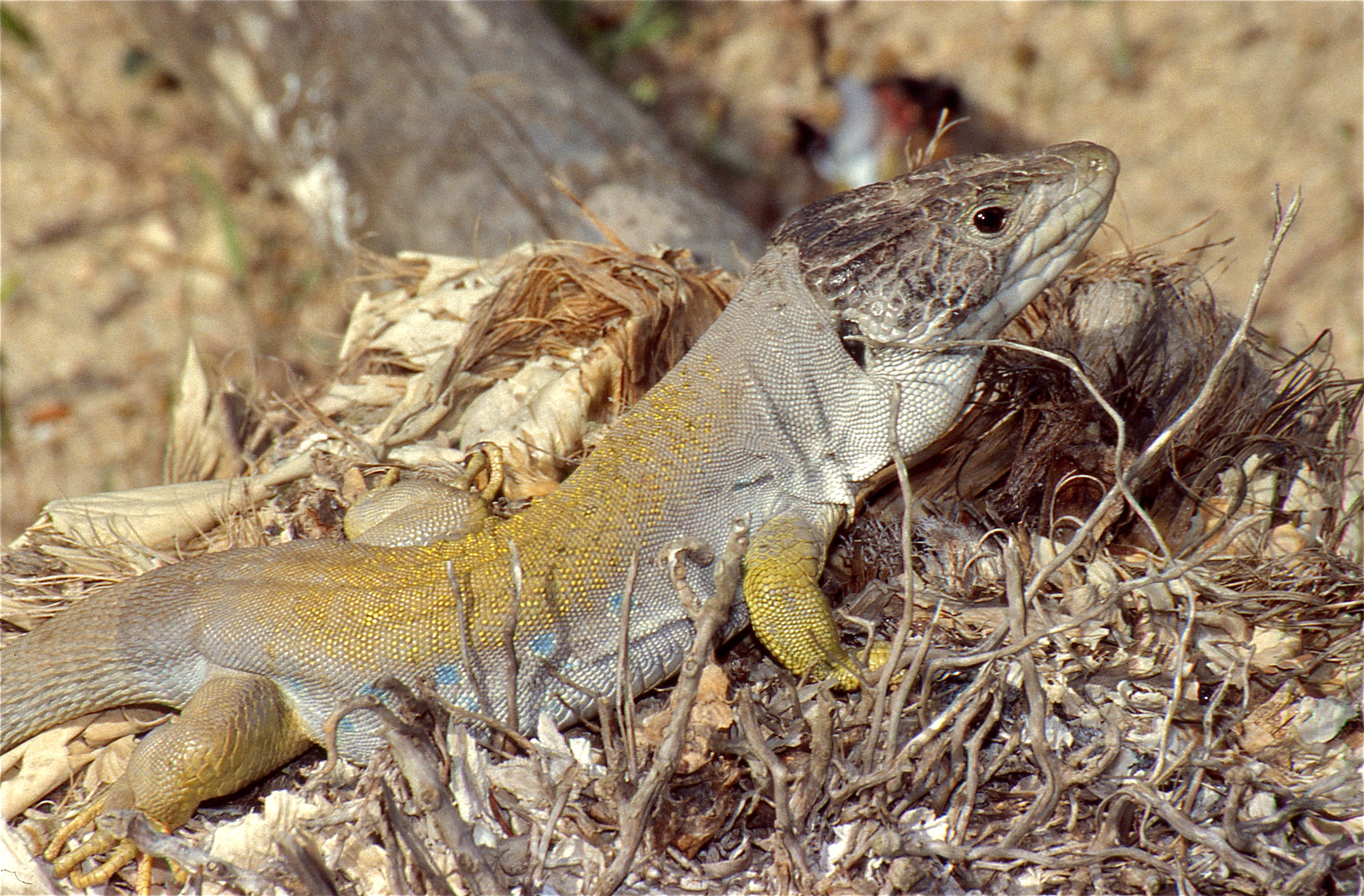

Scientific classification
- Domain: Eukaryota
- Kingdom: Animalia
- Phylum: Chordata
- Class: Reptilia
- Order: Squamata
- Family: Lacertidae
- Genus: Timon
- Species: T. nevadensis

Binomial name
- Timon nevadensis (Buchholz, 1963)

= Timon nevadensis =

Species of lizard

Timon nevadensis, the Sierra Nevada lizard, is a species of lizard in the family Lacertidae. It is endemic to Spain. It is sometimes considered a subspecies of the ocellated lizard.
