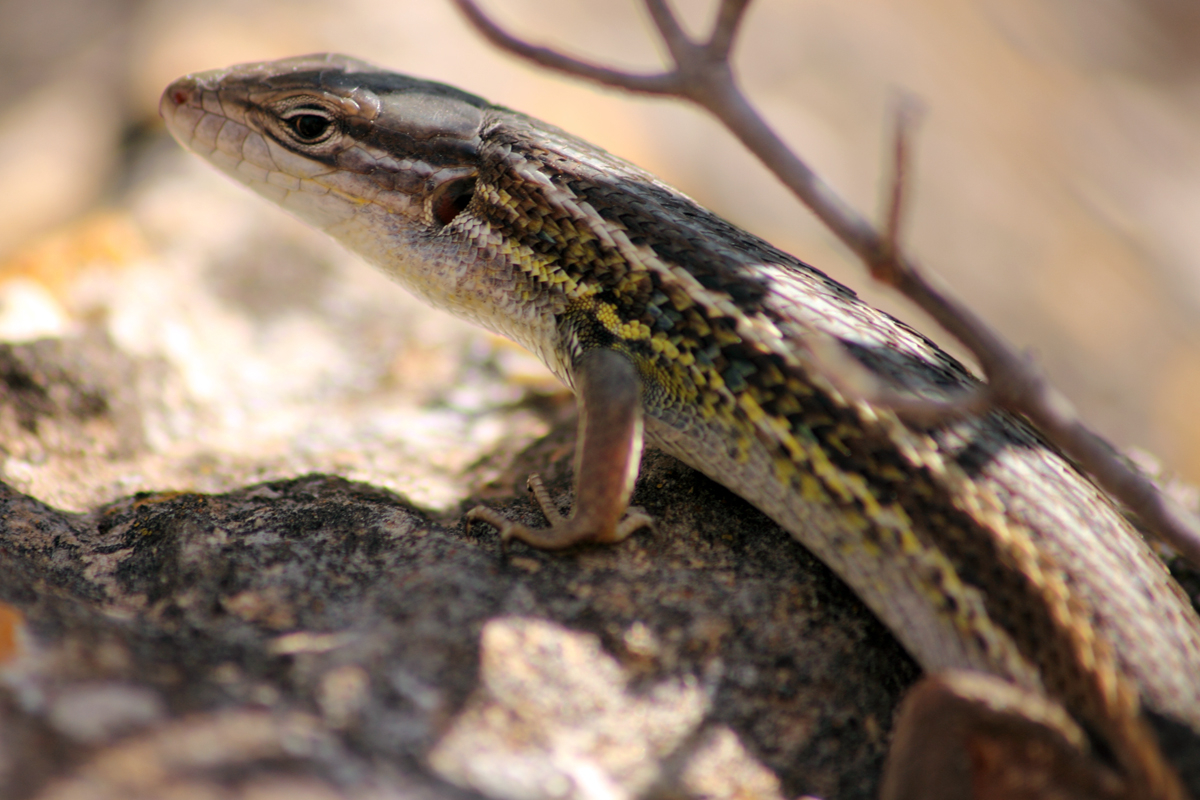

Conservation status
- Least Concern (IUCN 3.1)

Scientific classification
- Kingdom: Animalia
- Phylum: Chordata
- Class: Reptilia
- Order: Squamata
- Suborder: Lacertoidea
- Family: Lacertidae
- Genus: Psammodromus
- Species: P. jeanneae

Binomial name
- Psammodromus jeanneae Busak, Salvador and Lawson, 2006
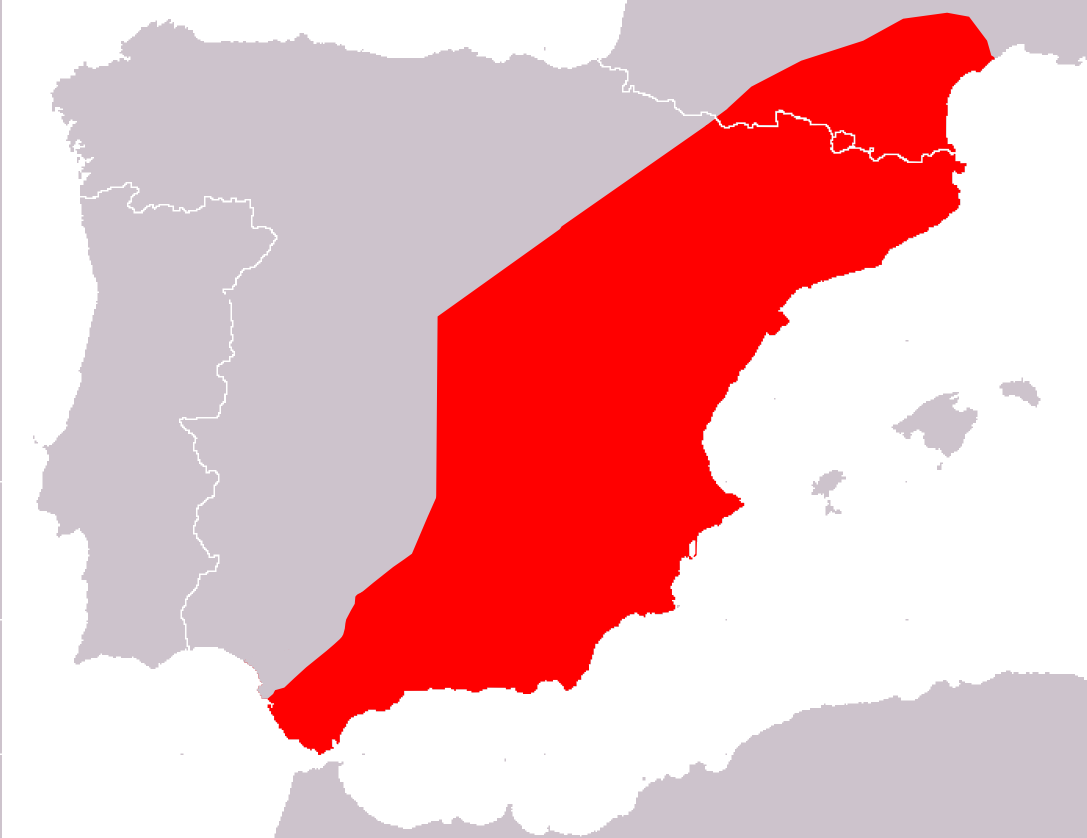

= Psammodromus jeanneae =

Species of reptile

Psammodromus jeanneae, is a species of lizards in the family Lacertidae. It is found in eastern Spain and southern France. The species was thought to have been a part of Psammodromus algirus but was found to be a separate species.
