= Small-scaled desert lizard =

There are two species of lizard named small-scaled desert lizard:

- Meroles micropholidotus
- Mesalina microlepis
