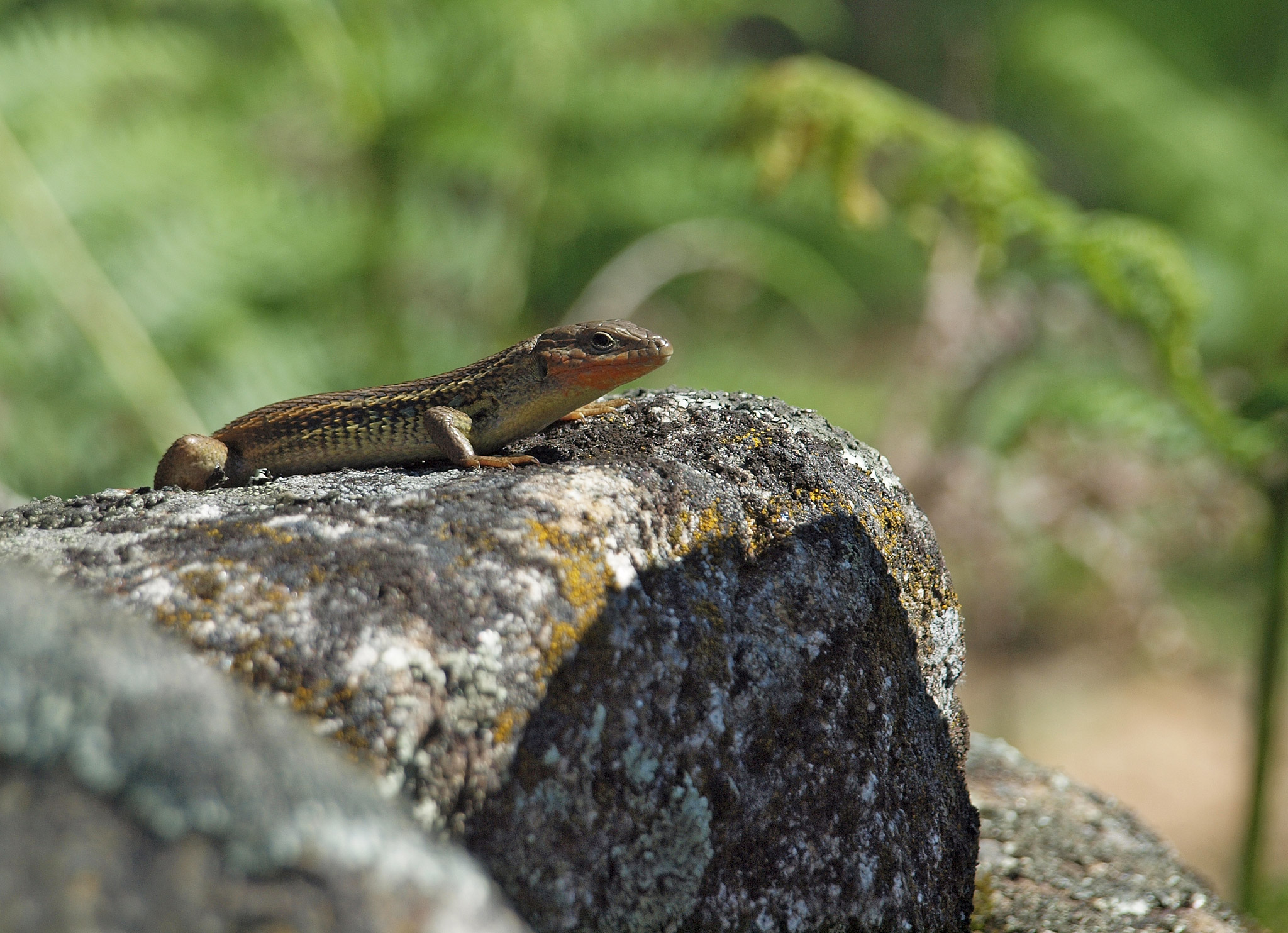

Conservation status
- Least Concern (IUCN 3.1)

Scientific classification
- Domain: Eukaryota
- Kingdom: Animalia
- Phylum: Chordata
- Class: Reptilia
- Order: Squamata
- Family: Lacertidae
- Genus: Psammodromus
- Species: P. manuelae

Binomial name
- Psammodromus manuelae Busack, Salvador & Lawson, 2006
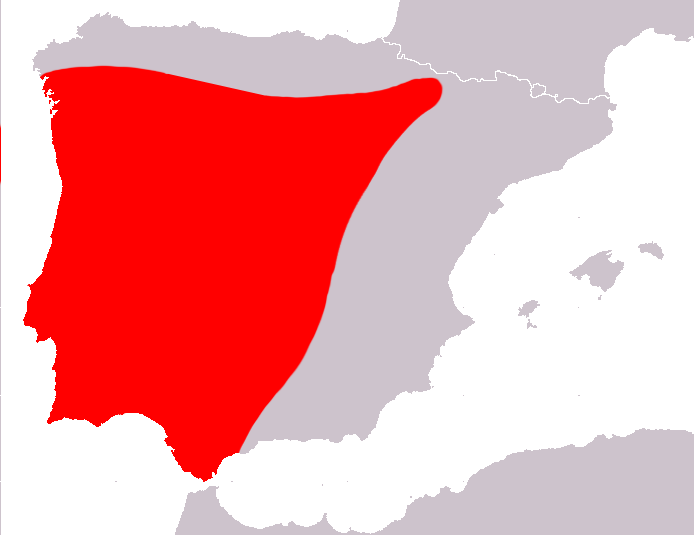

= Psammodromus manuelae =

Species of reptile

Psammodromus manulae is a species of lizard in the family Lacertidae. The species is endemic to Iberia and was previously thought to be a subspecies of the large psammodromus. Its population is stable and it is classified as least concern by the IUCN.

== Distribution ==
The species is endemic to Portugal and western Spain.
