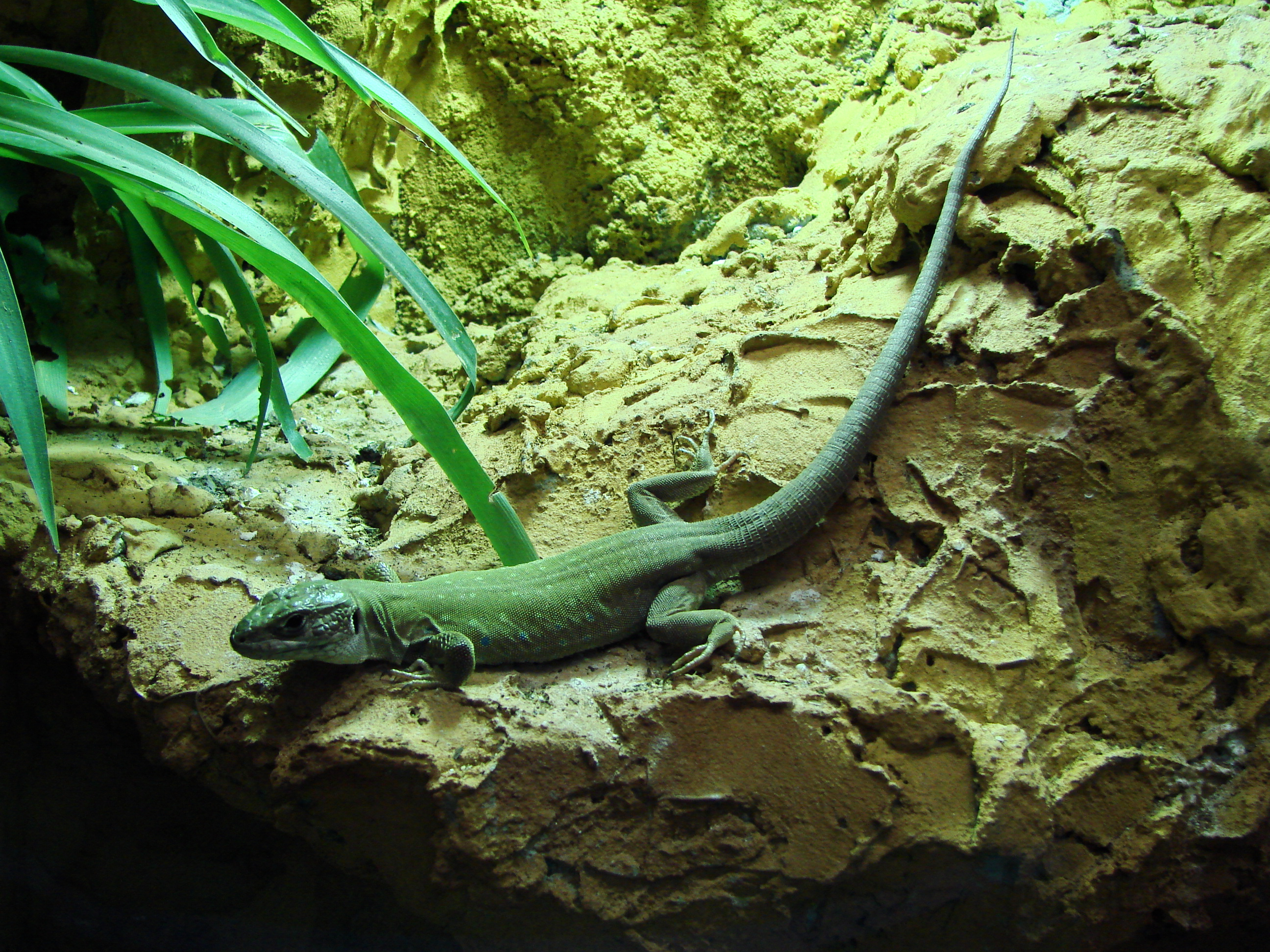

Conservation status
- Least Concern (IUCN 3.1)

Scientific classification
- Kingdom: Animalia
- Phylum: Chordata
- Class: Reptilia
- Order: Squamata
- Family: Lacertidae
- Genus: Timon
- Species: T. pater

Binomial name
- Timon pater (Lataste, 1880)

Synonyms
- Lacerta ocellata pater Lataste, 1880; Lacerta lepida pater — Angel, 1946; Lacerta pater — Bischoff, 1982; Timon pater — Mayer & Bischoff, 1996

= Timon pater =

Species of lizard

Timon pater, the North African ocellated lizard, is a species of lizard in the family Lacertidae, the wall lizards. The species is endemic to Northwest Africa.

== Geographic range ==
Timon pater is native to Tunisia, Algeria, and possibly Morocco.

== Reproduction ==
T. pater is oviparous.
