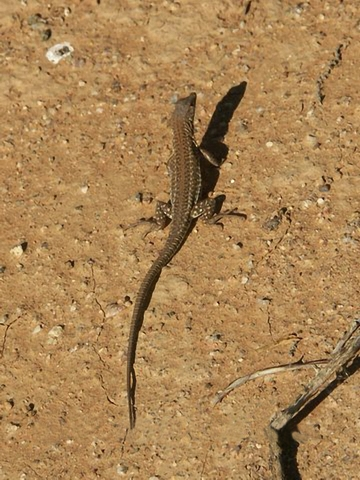
- Meroles knoxii in South Africa

Scientific classification
- Kingdom: Animalia
- Phylum: Chordata
- Class: Reptilia
- Order: Squamata
- Family: Lacertidae
- Subfamily: Lacertinae
- Genus: Meroles; Gray, 1838

Species
- Eight species, see text.

= Meroles =

Genus of lizards

Meroles is a genus of lizards, commonly known as desert lizards, in the family Lacertidae. The genus contains eight species, inhabiting southwestern Africa, especially the Namib Desert.

== Description ==
Desert lizards have fine, granular dorsal scales. The hind toes are elongated and possess fringes of scales.

== Species ==
The following eight species are recognized as being valid.

- Meroles anchietae (Bocage, 1867) - shovel-snouted lizard, Anchieta's dune lizard
- Meroles ctenodactylus (A. Smith, 1838) - giant desert lizard, Smith's sand lizard, Smith's desert lizard
- Meroles cuneirostris (Strauch, 1867) -wedge-snouted sand lizard, wedge-snouted desert lizard
- Meroles knoxii (Milne-Edwards, 1829) - Knox's ocellated sand lizard, Knox's desert lizard
- Meroles micropholidotus Mertens, 1938 - small-scaled desert lizard
- Meroles reticulatus (Bocage, 1867) - reticulate sand lizard
- Meroles squamulosus (W. Peters, 1869) - common rough-scaled lizard, savanna lizard
- Meroles suborbitalis (W. Peters, 1854) - spotted sand lizard

Nota bene: A binomial authority in parentheses indicates that the species was originally described in a genus other than Meroles.
