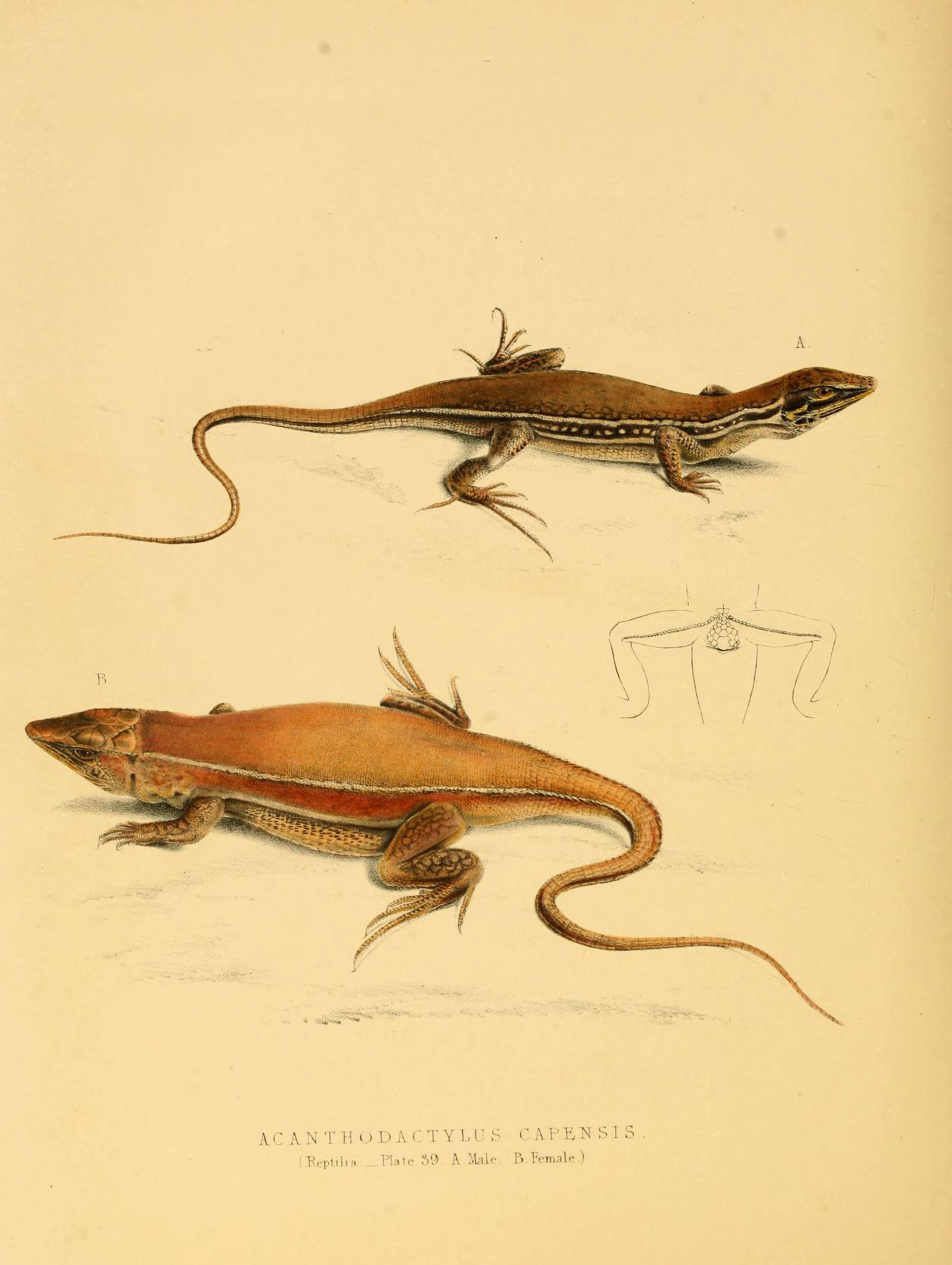
- Male and female

Scientific classification
- Domain: Eukaryota
- Kingdom: Animalia
- Phylum: Chordata
- Class: Reptilia
- Order: Squamata
- Family: Lacertidae
- Genus: Meroles
- Species: M. ctenodactylus

Binomial name
- Meroles ctenodactylus (Smith, 1838)

Synonyms
- Lacerta ctenodactylus Smith,1838; Eremias capensis Duméril & Bibron, 1839; Acanthodactylus capensis (Duméril & Bibron, 1839_; Scapteira ctenodactyla Loveridge, 1936; Scaptira ctenodactylus (Smith,1838)

= Meroles ctenodactylus =

Species of lizard

Meroles ctenodactylus, also known as the giant desert lizard, Smith's sand lizard or Smith's desert lizard, is a species of sand-dwelling lizard in the family Lacertidae. It occurs in westernmost South Africa and western Namibia.
