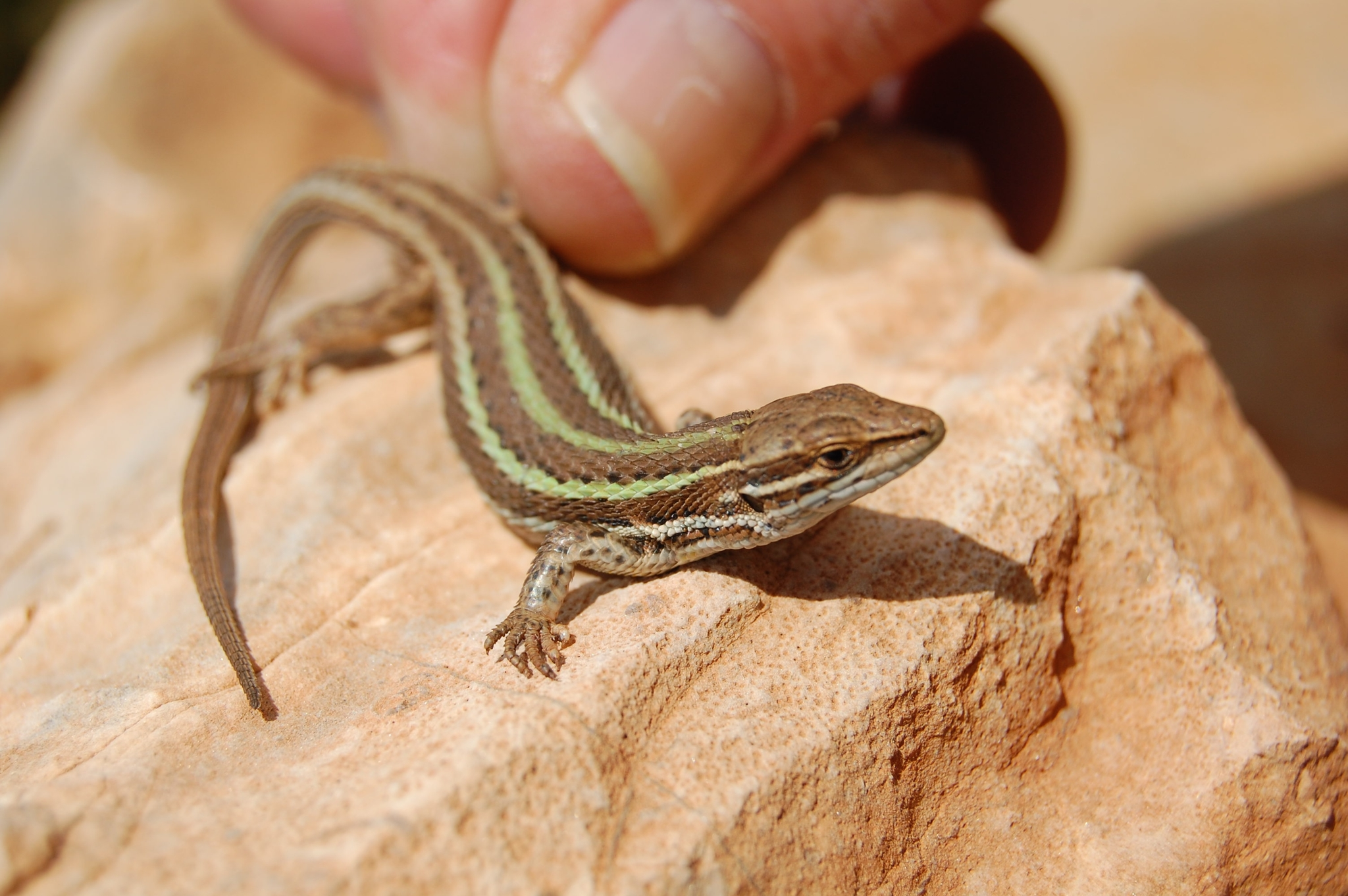
- P. microdactylus in Azilal, Morocco

Conservation status
- Endangered (IUCN 3.1)

Scientific classification
- Kingdom: Animalia
- Phylum: Chordata
- Class: Reptilia
- Order: Squamata
- Suborder: Lacertoidea
- Family: Lacertidae
- Genus: Psammodromus
- Species: P. microdactylus

Binomial name
- Psammodromus microdactylus (Boettger, 1881)

= Psammodromus microdactylus =

Species of lizard

Psammodromus microdactylus, the green psammodromus or small-fingered psammodromus, is a species of lizards in the family Lacertidae. It is endemic to Morocco.

Its natural habitats are Mediterranean-type shrubby vegetation and temperate grassland. It is threatened by habitat loss.
