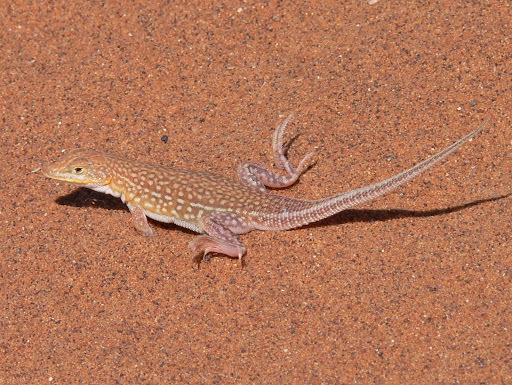

Scientific classification
- Domain: Eukaryota
- Kingdom: Animalia
- Phylum: Chordata
- Class: Reptilia
- Order: Squamata
- Family: Lacertidae
- Genus: Meroles
- Species: M. cuneirostris

Binomial name
- Meroles cuneirostris (Strauch, 1867)

= Meroles cuneirostris =

Species of lizard

Meroles cuneirostris, the wedge-snouted sand lizard or wedge-snouted desert lizard, is a species of sand-dwelling lizard in the family Lacertidae. It occurs in the Namib Desert of Namibia and South Africa.
