= Ichnotropis chapini =

Conservation status
- Endangered (IUCN 3.1)

Scientific classification
- Kingdom: Animalia
- Phylum: Chordata
- Class: Reptilia
- Order: Squamata
- Family: Lacertidae
- Genus: Ichnotropis
- Species: I. chapini

Binomial name
- Ichnotropis chapini Schmidt, 1919

Synonyms
- Ichnotropis chapini Schmidt, 1919; Ichnotropis capensis chapini — Laurent, 1952; Ichnotropis chapini — Edwards et al., 2013

Species of lizard

Ichnotropis chapini is a species of lizard in the family Lacertidae. The species is native to Central Africa.

== Etymology ==
The specific name, chapini, is in honor of American ornithologist James Paul Chapin.

== Geographic range ==
I. chapini is found in the Democratic Republic of the Congo and South Sudan.

== Habitat ==
The preferred natural habitat of I. chapini is savanna, at altitudes of 1,100–1,200 m (3,600–3,900 ft).

== Reproduction ==
I. chapini is oviparous.
