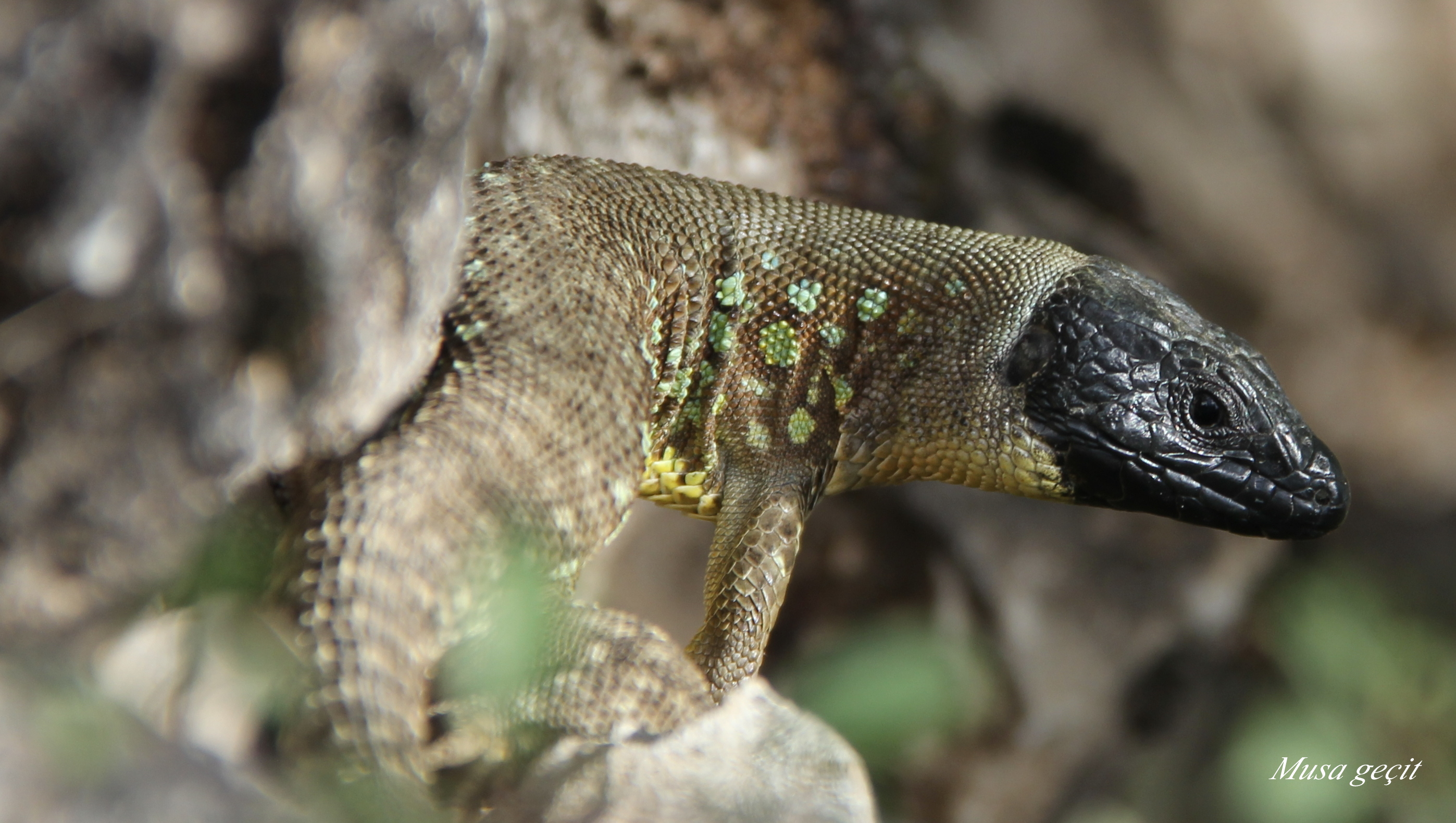

Conservation status
- Least Concern (IUCN 3.1)

Scientific classification
- Kingdom: Animalia
- Phylum: Chordata
- Class: Reptilia
- Order: Squamata
- Family: Lacertidae
- Genus: Timon
- Species: T. princeps

Binomial name
- Timon princeps (Blanford, 1874)

Synonyms
- Lacerta princeps Blanford, 1874; Timon princeps — Mayer & Bischoff, 1996

= Timon princeps =

Species of lizard

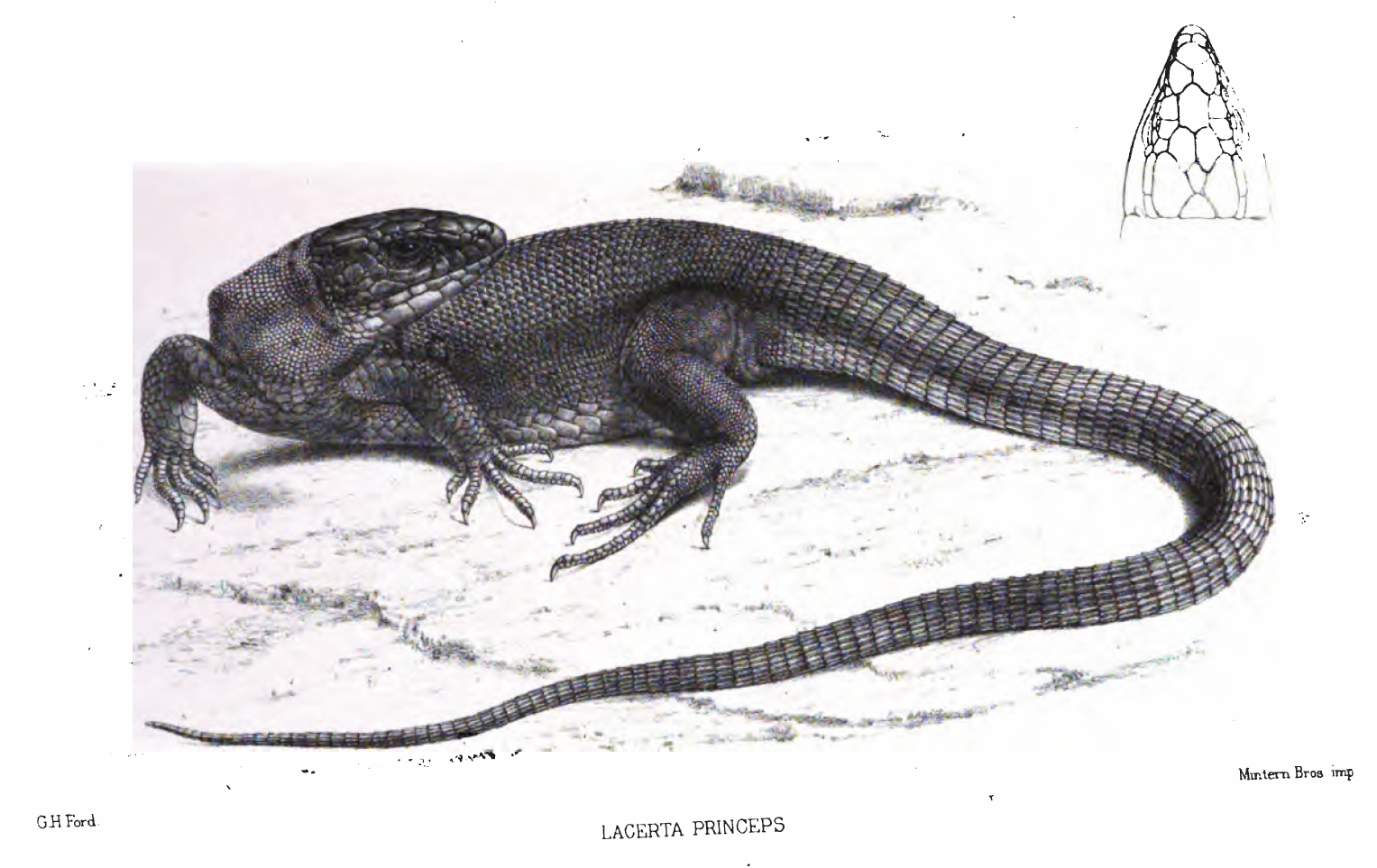
Illustration of T. princeps, by G.H. Ford, from Blanford (1876).

Timon princeps, commonly called the Siirt lizard or the Zagrosian lizard, is a species of lizard in the family Lacertidae (wall lizards). The species is endemic to Western Asia.

== Description ==
The dorsal scales of T. princeps are an olive-tinted grey color, and the underbelly is an off-white. They have blue spots edged with black on their sides. Adult males have blue around their mouths, and adult females often have dark olive-green or black heads.

The outer row of ventral scales are smooth, and there are 13-17 femoral pores on each side.

Juvenile T. princeps often have less spotting on their backs, in comparison to the spotting found on adults.

== Geographic range ==
Timon princeps is native to southwestern Iran (central Zagros Mountains near Shiraz), northern Iraq, northeastern Syria, and southeastern Turkey.

== Ecology ==
The population of Timon princeps located in Iran is exclusively found in the forested areas of the Zagros Mountains.

== Reproduction ==
T. princeps is oviparous. During breeding, males will bite onto the lower back of females.

== Conservation ==
As of December of 2008, Timon princeps is listed as Least Concern on the IUCN Red List.
