= Timon kurdistanicus =

Scientific classification
- Kingdom: Animalia
- Phylum: Chordata
- Class: Reptilia
- Order: Squamata
- Family: Lacertidae
- Genus: Timon
- Species: T. kurdistanicus

Binomial name
- Timon kurdistanicus (Sukhov, 1936)

Species of lizard

Timon kurdistanicus, the Kurdistan lizard, is a species of lizard in the family Lacertidae. It is found in north west Iran, north east Iraq, and south eastern Turkey.
