= Ichnotropis tanganicana =

Scientific classification
- Domain: Eukaryota
- Kingdom: Animalia
- Phylum: Chordata
- Class: Reptilia
- Order: Squamata
- Family: Lacertidae
- Genus: Ichnotropis
- Species: I. tanganicana

Binomial name
- Ichnotropis tanganicana Boulenger, 1917

Species of lizard

Ichnotropis tanganicana also known as the Tanzanian rough-scaled lizard, is a species of lizard found in Tanzania and Burundi.
