= Meroles reticulatus =

Scientific classification
- Domain: Eukaryota
- Kingdom: Animalia
- Phylum: Chordata
- Class: Reptilia
- Order: Squamata
- Family: Lacertidae
- Genus: Meroles
- Species: M. reticulatus

Binomial name
- Meroles reticulatus Bocage, 1867)

Species of lizard

Meroles reticulatus, the reticulate sand lizard, is a species of sand-dwelling lizard in the family Lacertidae. It occurs in Namibia and Angola.
