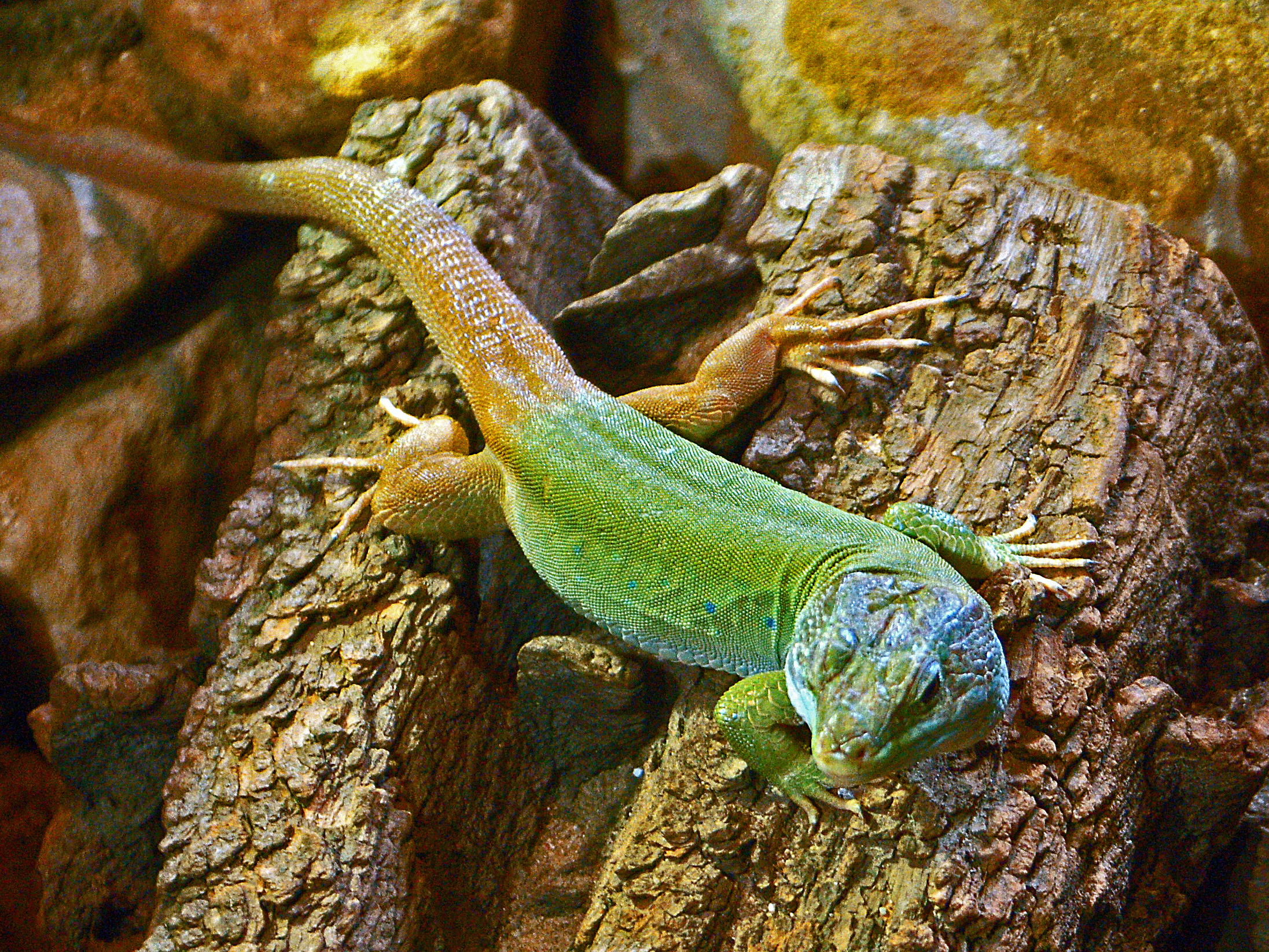
- Timon tangitanus at the Prague Zoo

Conservation status
- Least Concern (IUCN 3.1)

Scientific classification
- Kingdom: Animalia
- Phylum: Chordata
- Class: Reptilia
- Order: Squamata
- Family: Lacertidae
- Genus: Timon
- Species: T. tangitanus

Binomial name
- Timon tangitanus (Boulenger, 1887)

Synonyms
- Lacerta ocellata Var. tangitana Boulenger, 1887; Timon tangitanus — Schlüter, 2004; Lacerta (Timon) tangitana — Montori et al., 2005; Timon tangitanus — Arnold et al., 2007; Lacerta (Timon) pater tangitanus — Sindaco & Jeremčenko, 2008; Timon tangitanus — Ahmadzadeh et al., 2016

= Timon tangitanus =

Species of lizard

Timon tangitanus, commonly known as the Moroccan eyed lizard, is a species of lizard in the family Lacertidae. The species is endemic to Northwest Africa.

== Description ==
T. tangitanus can reach a total length (including tail) of about 70 cm (28 in). The body is green or brown, with blue ocelli on the back.

== Taxonomy ==
For decades T. tangitanus has been regarded as belonging to the genus Lacerta.

== Diet ==
T. tangitanus mainly feed on invertebrates, but also on fruits.

== Distribution ==
T. tangitanus is found in Northwest Africa (mountains of northwestern Algeria, mediterranean regions of Morocco and Western Sahara).

== Habitat ==
The natural habitats of T. tangitanus are temperate forests, temperate shrubland, and Mediterranean-type shrubby vegetation. It prefers woodland edge, scrub and rocky areas.

== Conservation status ==
T. tangitanus is threatened by habitat loss.
