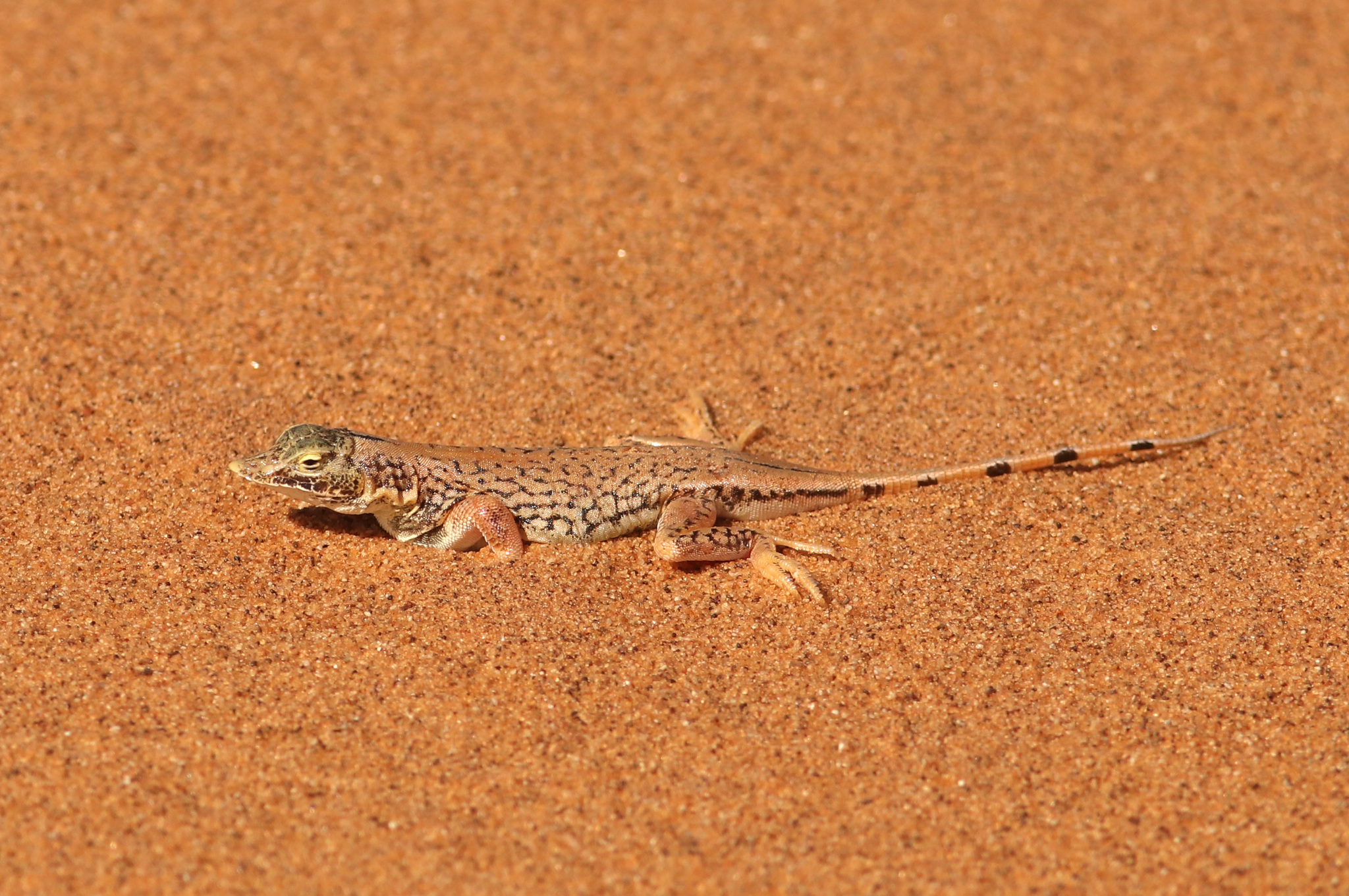

Conservation status
- Least Concern (IUCN 3.1)

Scientific classification
- Kingdom: Animalia
- Phylum: Chordata
- Class: Reptilia
- Order: Squamata
- Family: Lacertidae
- Genus: Meroles
- Species: M. anchietae

Binomial name
- Meroles anchietae (Bocage, 1867)

Synonyms
- Pachyrhynchus anchietæ Bocage, 1867; Aporosaura anchietæ — Boulenger, 1887; Aporosaura anchietae — Loveridge, 1936; Meroles anchietae — Arnold, 1989

= Shovel-snouted lizard =

Species of lizard

The shovel-snouted lizard (Meroles anchietae), also known commonly as Anchieta's desert lizard, Anchieta's dune lizard and the Namib sand-diver, is a species of lizard in the family Lacertidae. The species is native to southern Africa.

== Etymology ==
The specific name, anchietae, is in honor of Portuguese naturalist José Alberto de Oliveira Anchieta, who was an explorer of Africa.

== Geographic range ==
M. anchietae is found in Angola and Namibia.

== Habitat ==
The preferred natural habitat of M. anchietae is desert, with aeolian sand dunes and sparse vegetation, at altitudes from sea level to 500 m (1,600 ft).

== Description ==
Adults of M. anchietae have a snout-to-vent length (SVL) of about 5 cm (2.0 in).

== Diet ==
M. anchietae preys upon insects, especially small beetles, as well as fresh plants. Some individuals in the Namib Desert have been observed to eat seeds occasionally, while others consume seeds exclusively. Such seeds are typically eaten in their green, unripe phase, and could thus be considered a form of herbivory rather than granivory.

== Reproduction ==
M. anchietae is oviparous.
