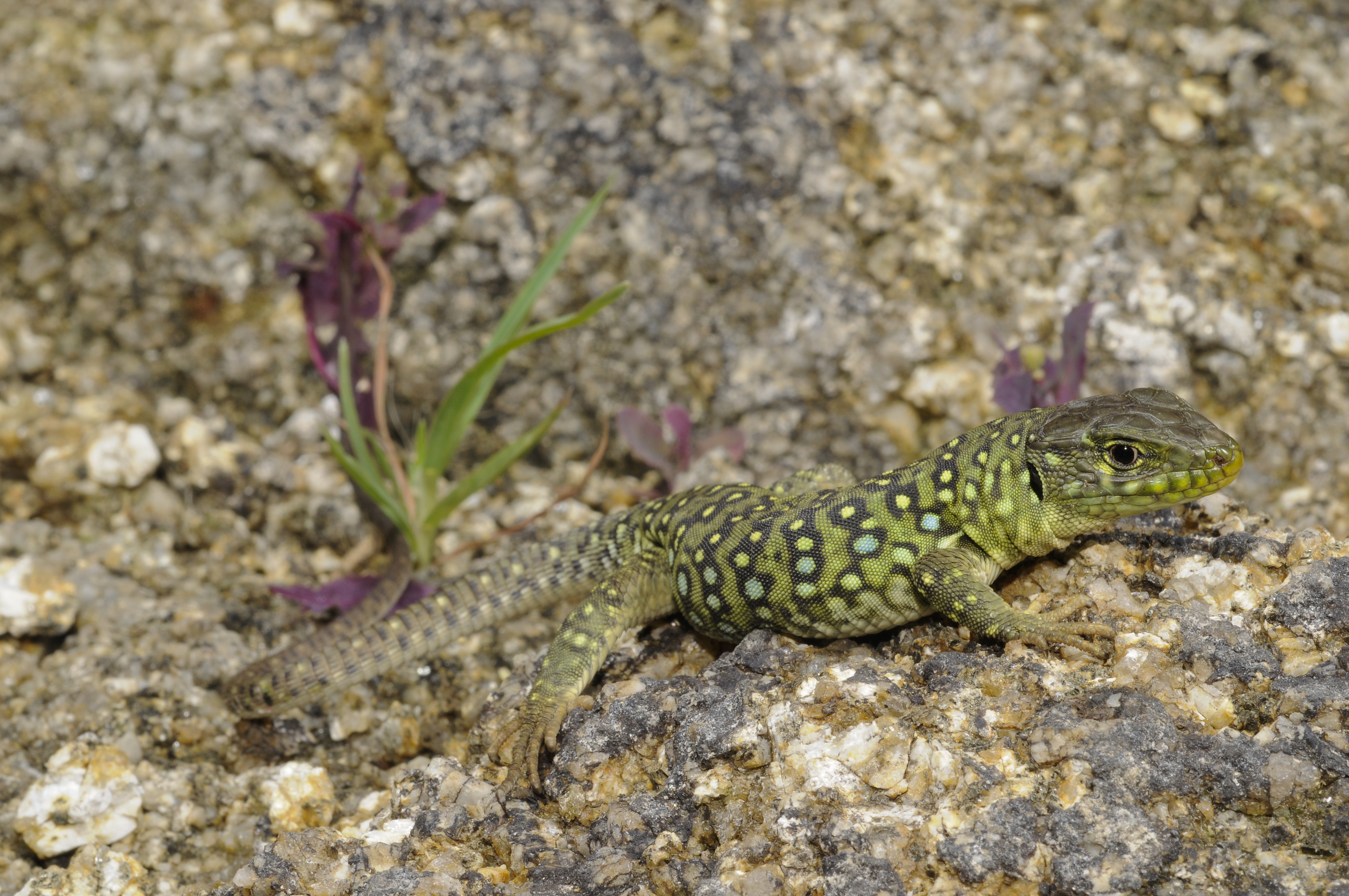
- Timon lepidus

Scientific classification
- Kingdom: Animalia
- Phylum: Chordata
- Class: Reptilia
- Order: Squamata
- Family: Lacertidae
- Subfamily: Lacertinae
- Genus: Timon; Tschudi, 1836

Species
- Six, see text.

= Timon (lizard) =

Genus of lizards

Timon is a genus of wall lizards in the family Lacertidae.

== Species ==
The genus Timon contains the following six extant species, which are recognized as valid.

- Timon kurdistanicus (Suchow, 1936) - Kurdistan lizard
- Timon lepidus (Daudin, 1802) - ocellated lizard, jewelled lizard
- Timon nevadensis (Buchholz, 1963) - Sierra Nevada lizard
- Timon pater (Lataste, 1880)
- Timon princeps (Blanford, 1874) - Siirt lizard, Zagrosian lizard
- Timon tangitanus (Boulenger, 1887) - Moroccan eyed lizard

Furthermore, two extinct species have been placed in the genus Timon:

- †Timon eratosthenesi (Čerňanský & Augé, 2013) - Late Oligocene, Germany
- †Timon planeutes (Georgalis & Čerňanský, 2026) - late Eocene–early Oligocene, France

Nota bene: A binomial authority in parentheses indicates that the species was originally described in a genus other than Timon.
