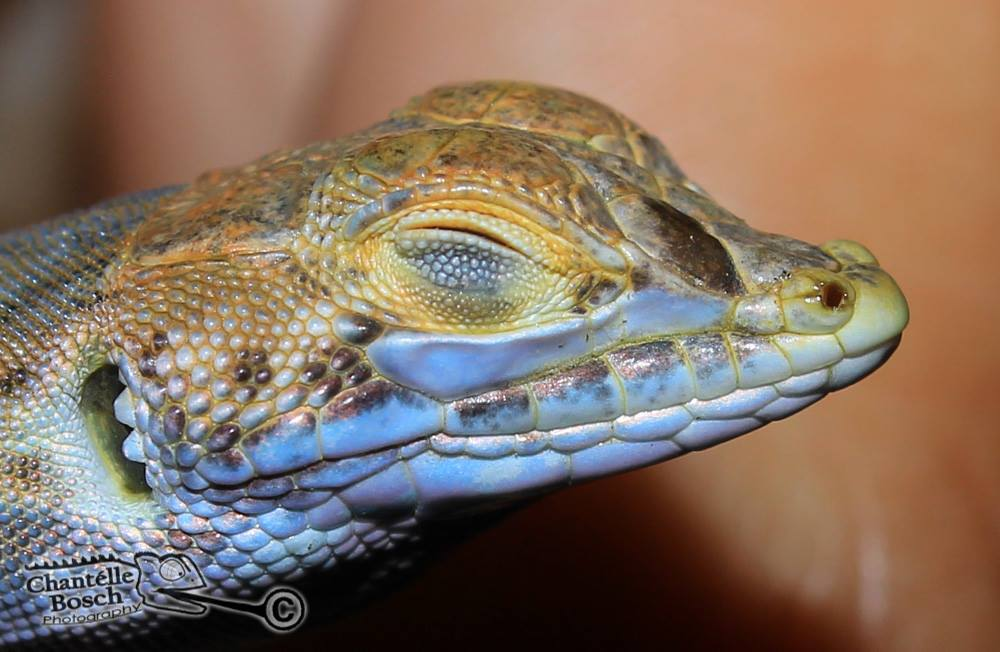

Scientific classification
- Domain: Eukaryota
- Kingdom: Animalia
- Phylum: Chordata
- Class: Reptilia
- Order: Squamata
- Family: Lacertidae
- Genus: Meroles
- Species: M. suborbitalis

Binomial name
- Meroles suborbitalis (Peters, 1854)

= Spotted sand lizard =

Species of lizard

The spotted sand lizard (Meroles suborbitalis) is a species of lizard found in South Africa, Namibia and Botswana.
