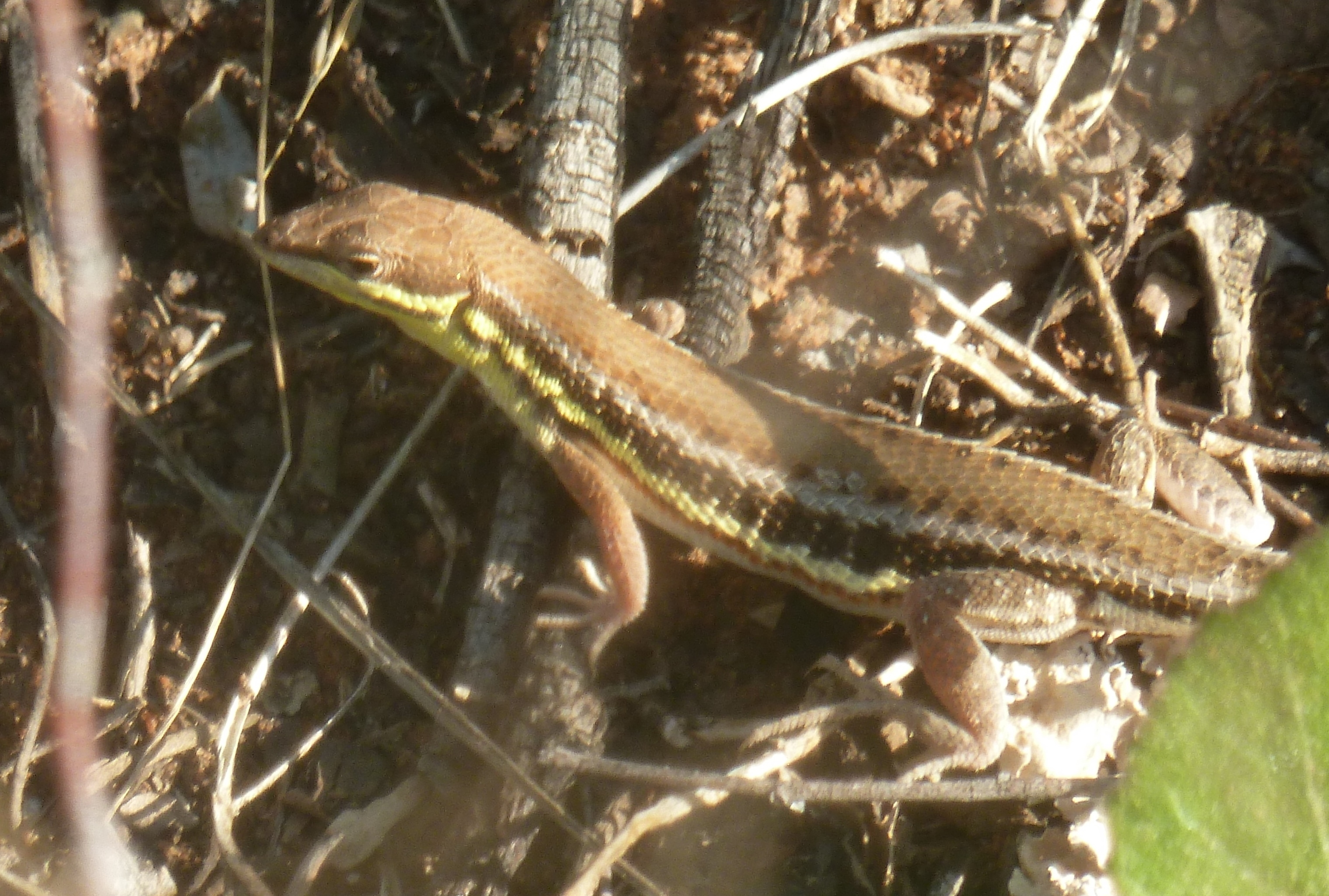
- in Limpopo, South Africa

Scientific classification
- Kingdom: Animalia
- Phylum: Chordata
- Class: Reptilia
- Order: Squamata
- Suborder: Lacertoidea
- Family: Lacertidae
- Genus: Ichnotropis
- Species: I. capensis

Binomial name
- Ichnotropis capensis (Smith, 1838)

Synonyms
- Algyra capensis Smith, 1838

= Ichnotropis capensis =

Cape rough-scaled lizard

Species of lizard

Ichnotropis capensis is a species of African lizard, which is native to the southern Afrotropics. It is the type species for the genus Ichnotropis, and is commonly called the Cape rough-scaled lizard due to them being found in southern Africa's Cape region. They are also called ornate rough-scaled lizard or Smith's rough-scaled sand lizard. The small lizards are terrestrial and occur in grassland, desert and brush areas of southern Africa.

== Description ==
I. capensis are medium-sized lizards with slender bodies, long tails, and well developed legs. Most of the specimens found are less than 76 mm long in snout–to-vent length (SVL) and share the general characteristics of its genus, including the following:

- Keeled or overlapping dorsal scales are present, and the head shields are smooth to slightly rough
- Subocular scales border the lip, and no collar is present
- Smooth or tubular lamellae are present under the toes, but the toes lack a serrated or fringed edge
- The cylindrical tail lacks a lateral fringe

I. capensis is notably distinct from the genus in that the hind legs do not reach the underarm of the forelimbs. Adults have uniform grey and yellowish brown backs with white lateral stripes that may be bordered with dark black spots. The juvenile has a pale grey and brown back with white lateral stripes.

== Races ==
There are two accepted races:

- Ichnotropis capensis capensis (A.Smith, 1838)
- Ichnotropis capensis nigrescens Laurent, 1952

== Habitat ==
It occurs in semi-arid shrub savannas of Africa, where they seek shelter in soft soiled burrows, under rocks and brush. The species has been reported from South Africa, Namibia, Botswana, Zimbabwe, Mozambique, and Zambia.

== Biology ==
These lizards are insectivorous and feed on termites and other small insects. They are active hunters during the day and many specimens have been found around termite mounds.

=== Mating ===
Along with other Ichnotropis, this lizard species is semelparous, with little overlap of adult and juveniles life stages. Life expectancy is 13 to 14 months, and mating occurs in the spring with hatchlings appearing in late summer from October to December. Females make an inclining burrow in soft soil 100 to 200 mm long and lay 3-9 eggs (6.5 mm x 9.5 mm). The females may have up to two clutches in their short lifetimes (then, not truly semelparous).

=== Taxonomy and evolution ===
Based on morphological evidence from the capensis species, southern African genus Ichnotropis and North American genus Psammodromus diverged from a common ancestor in the lineage of Lacerta lepida and Lacerta monticola during the Oligocene epoch (24 to 36 million years ago).

=== Predators ===
It is recorded as prey of the shikra and secretarybird, both birds of prey that are native to Africa. They may have other predators as well, as they are small lizards. There is no evidence suggesting that they are endangered or hunted by indigenous people who live near their habitat.
