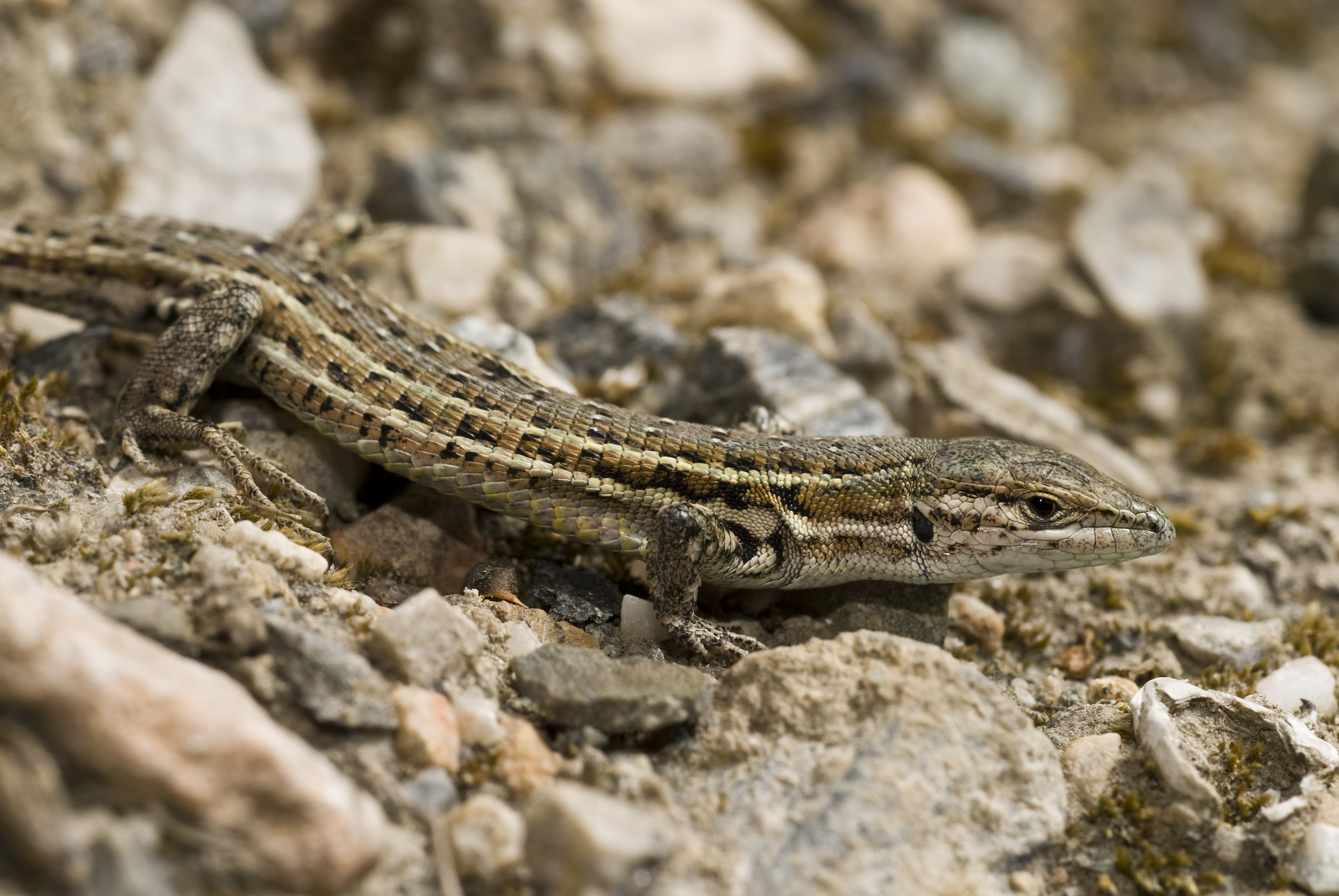

Conservation status
- Least Concern (IUCN 3.1)

Scientific classification
- Kingdom: Animalia
- Phylum: Chordata
- Class: Reptilia
- Order: Squamata
- Suborder: Lacertoidea
- Family: Lacertidae
- Genus: Psammodromus
- Species: P. hispanicus

Binomial name
- Psammodromus hispanicus Fitzinger, 1826
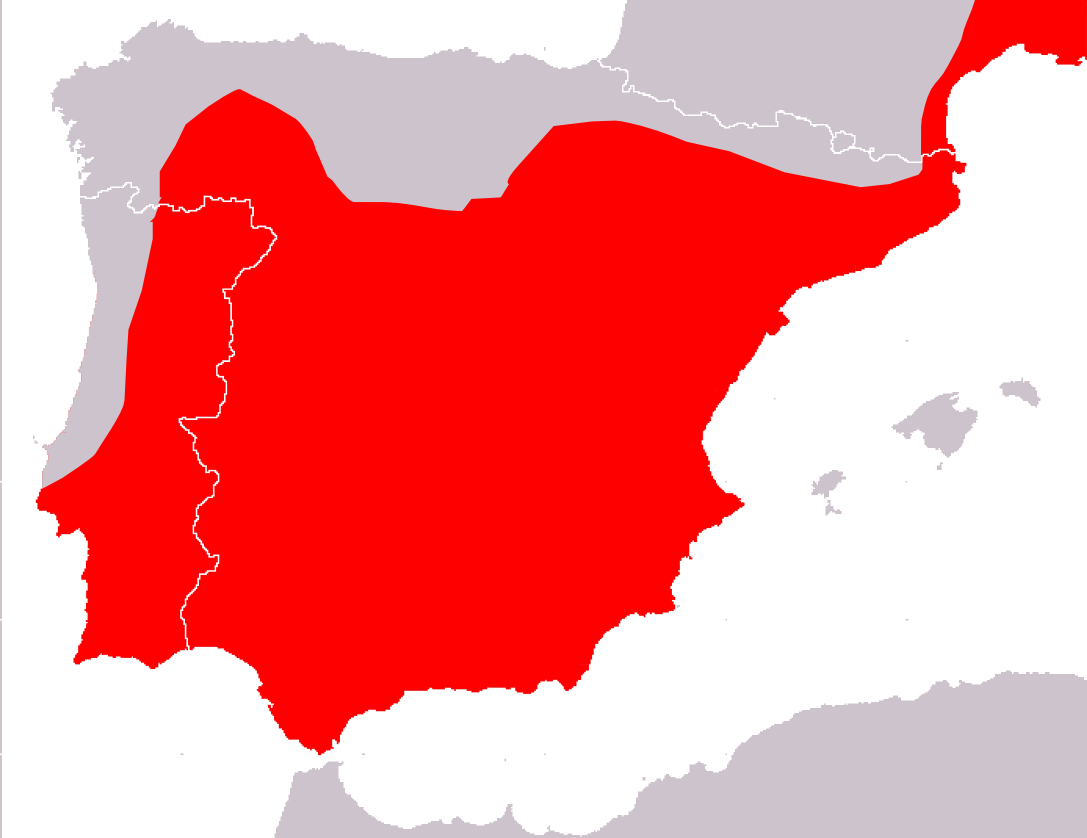

= Psammodromus hispanicus =

Species of lizard

Psammodromus hispanicus, the Spanish psammodromus, is a species of lizard in the family Lacertidae. It is found in France, Portugal, and Spain.

Its natural habitats are Mediterranean-type shrubby vegetation, temperate grassland, sandy shores, arable land, pastureland, and rural gardens. It is threatened by habitat loss.

== History and origin ==
The Spanish psammodromus was first described by Fitzinger in 1826, the scientific name of this species is Psammodromus hispanicus. Psammodromus from Greek meaning 'sand' and 'to run'. hispanicus from Latin meaning 'from Spain'.

== Characteristics ==
They are one of the smallest lizards of France, characterised by their unique patterns (see photos).

== Description ==
=== Size ===
The eggs measure 9 x 6 to 13 x 8 mm. The young hatch out at around 20 to 25 mm long. They can grow up to around 50 mm long, their tail being about 1.5 the body size giving them a total adult size of around 120 to 130 mm long.

=== Form ===
They are slender and long-bodied. They have a small pointed head, normal to large hind limbs and a very long, slender tail, they have keeled, overlapping scales and like its cousin the large psammodromus, they have a rough appearance.

=== Patterns and colours ===
They are often dark brown, olive-brown or dark red, rusty colour with many lighter irregular blotches, streaks and small lines especially in the middle of the sides and on the top of flanks. But also along the top of the back where they usually have many small streaks of white bordered by a darker colour. Their belly is yellowish.

== Geographical range ==
They are found over most of the Iberian Peninsula excluding the north coast and the Pyrenees. In France they can only be found along the Mediterranean coast.

== Subspecies ==
edwarsianus - Found in France hispanicus - Iberian peninsula

== Sexual differences ==
Females are larger in spring due to their eggs.

== Seasonal variations ==
Females are larger in spring due to their eggs.

== Biology ==
=== Diet ===
They feed mainly on small insects & spiders.

=== Defensive habits ===
When disturbed they will flee into close by vegetation. If they are caught however, they may squeak, but never bite.

=== Reproduction ===
Breeding occurs when they wake up from hibernation in spring. After only a few weeks about 2 to 8 eggs are laid in a moist, warm spot, usually under hay piles, in rotting wood piles and other places of this kind. The eggs incubate for around 8 weeks before hatching. The females can lay up to 2 clutches of eggs.

=== Sexual maturity, life span ===
The average life span for Psammodromus hispanicus is only 2 to 3 years, many specimens die after their first mating season. They reach their sexual maturity in their first year.

=== Habits ===
They are active by day. They are often seen running from one clump of vegetation to another if you come across them.

== Ecology ==
=== Habitat ===
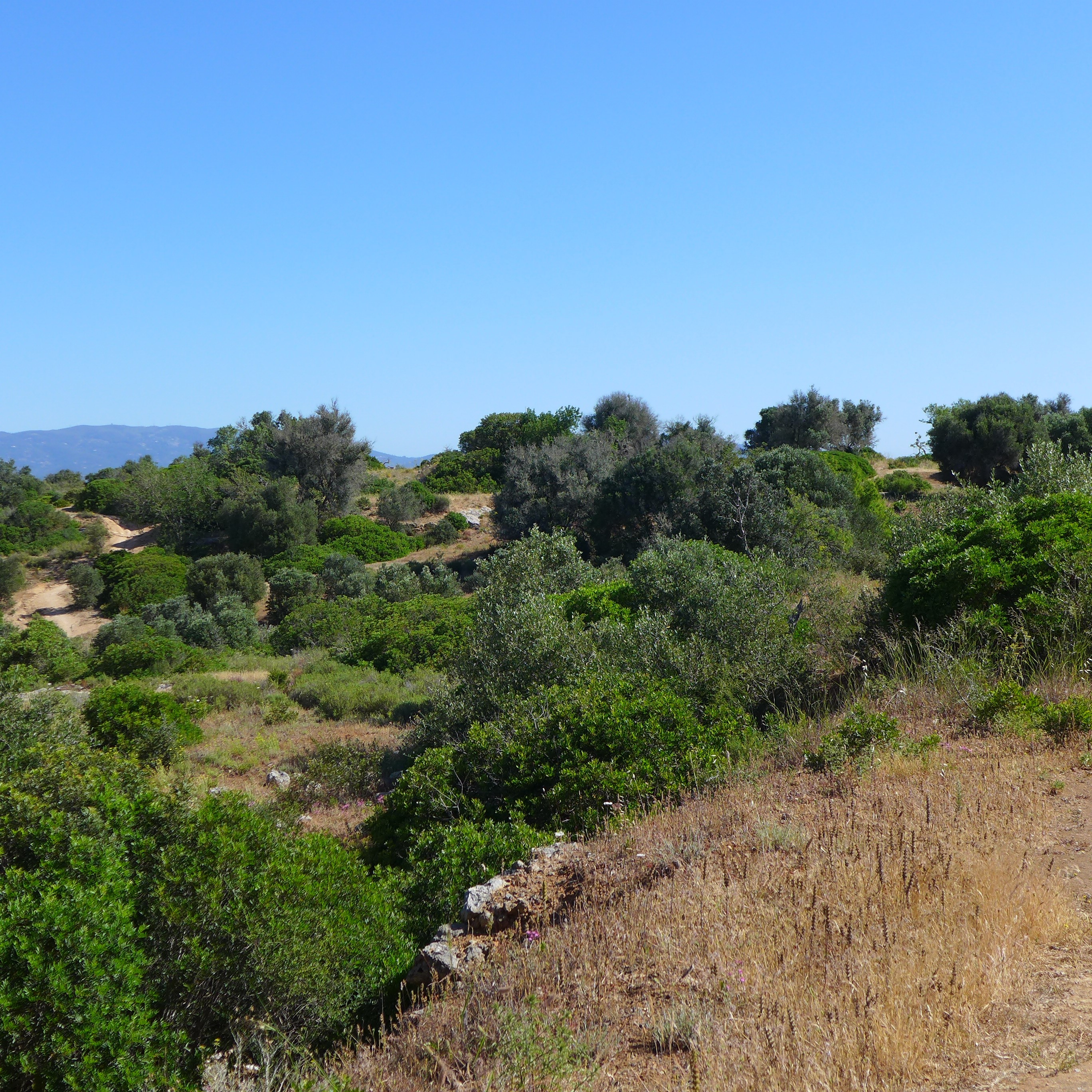
Habitat in Portugal

They are found at up to 1500 meters in altitude. They inhabit dry open Mediterranean areas. These habitats are characterised by a stone cover and in most cases, a loose soiled area not too far away (sand...).

=== Predators ===
They are the prey for many species, birds, large insects, snakes, other mammals.
