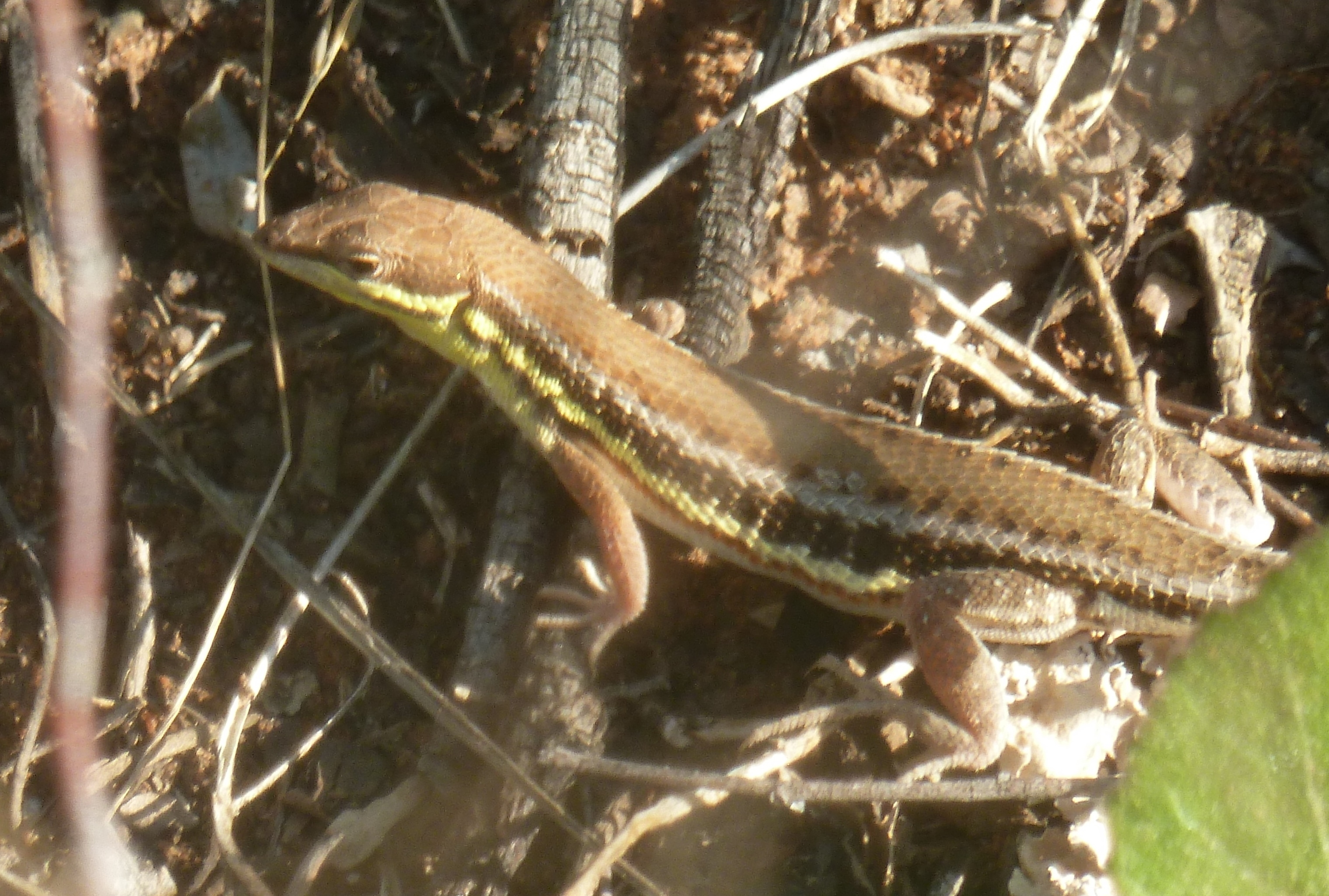
- Ichnotropis capensis in Limpopo, South Africa

Scientific classification
- Kingdom: Animalia
- Phylum: Chordata
- Class: Reptilia
- Order: Squamata
- Family: Lacertidae
- Subfamily: Lacertinae
- Genus: Ichnotropis; W. Peters, 1854

= Ichnotropis =

Genus of lizards

Ichnotropis is a genus of African lizards in the family Lacertidae. Species in the genus Ichnotropis are commonly called rough-scaled lizards.

== Species ==
The following six species are recognized as being valid.

- Ichnotropis bivittata Bocage, 1866 - Angolan rough-scaled lizard
- Ichnotropis capensis (A. Smith, 1838) - Cape rough-scaled lizard, ornate rough-scaled lizard, Smith's rough-scaled sand lizard
- Ichnotropis chapini K.P. Schmidt, 1919
- Ichnotropis grandiceps Broadley, 1967 - Caprivi rough-scaled lizard
- Ichnotropis microlepidota Marx, 1956 - Marx's rough-scaled lizard
- Ichnotropis tanganicana Boulenger, 1917 - Tanzanian rough-scaled lizard,

Nota bene: A binomial authority in parentheses indicates that the species was originally described in a genus other than Ichnotropis.
