= Ichnotropis bivittata =

Scientific classification
- Domain: Eukaryota
- Kingdom: Animalia
- Phylum: Chordata
- Class: Reptilia
- Order: Squamata
- Family: Lacertidae
- Genus: Ichnotropis
- Species: I. bivittata

Binomial name
- Ichnotropis bivittata Bocage, 1866

Species of lizard

Ichnotropis bivittata also known as the Angolan rough-scaled lizard , is a species of lizard found in Tanzania, Democratic Republic of the Congo, Angola, Zambia, Malawi, and Gabon.
