= Meroles micropholidotus =

Scientific classification
- Domain: Eukaryota
- Kingdom: Animalia
- Phylum: Chordata
- Class: Reptilia
- Order: Squamata
- Family: Lacertidae
- Genus: Meroles
- Species: M. micropholidotus

Binomial name
- Meroles micropholidotus Mertens, 1938

Species of lizard

Meroles micropholidotus, the small-scaled desert lizard, is a species of sand-dwelling lizard in the family Lacertidae. It occurs in Namibia.
