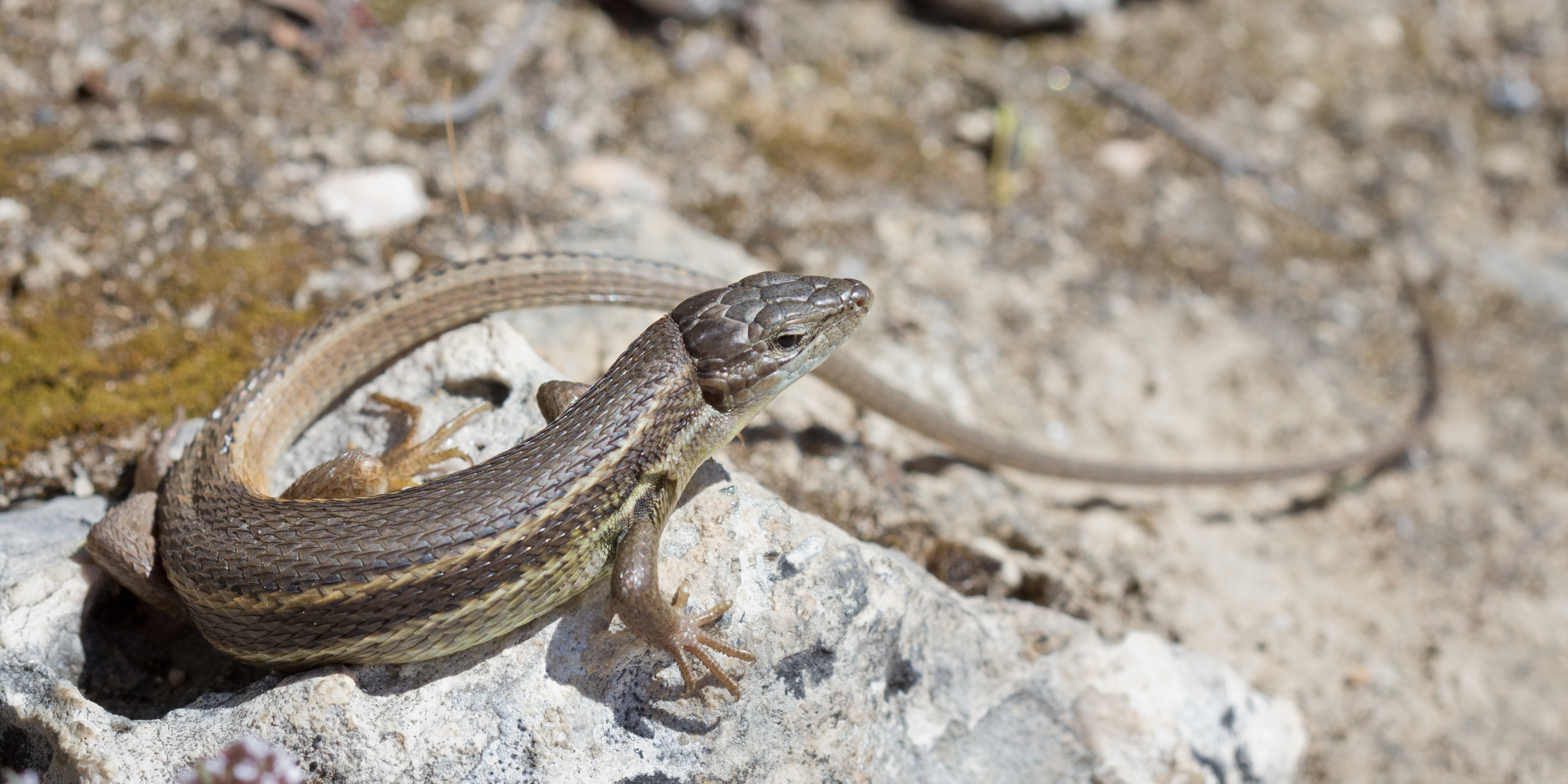

Conservation status
- Least Concern (IUCN 3.1)

Scientific classification
- Kingdom: Animalia
- Phylum: Chordata
- Class: Reptilia
- Order: Squamata
- Family: Lacertidae
- Genus: Psammodromus
- Species: P. algirus

Binomial name
- Psammodromus algirus (Linnaeus, 1758)
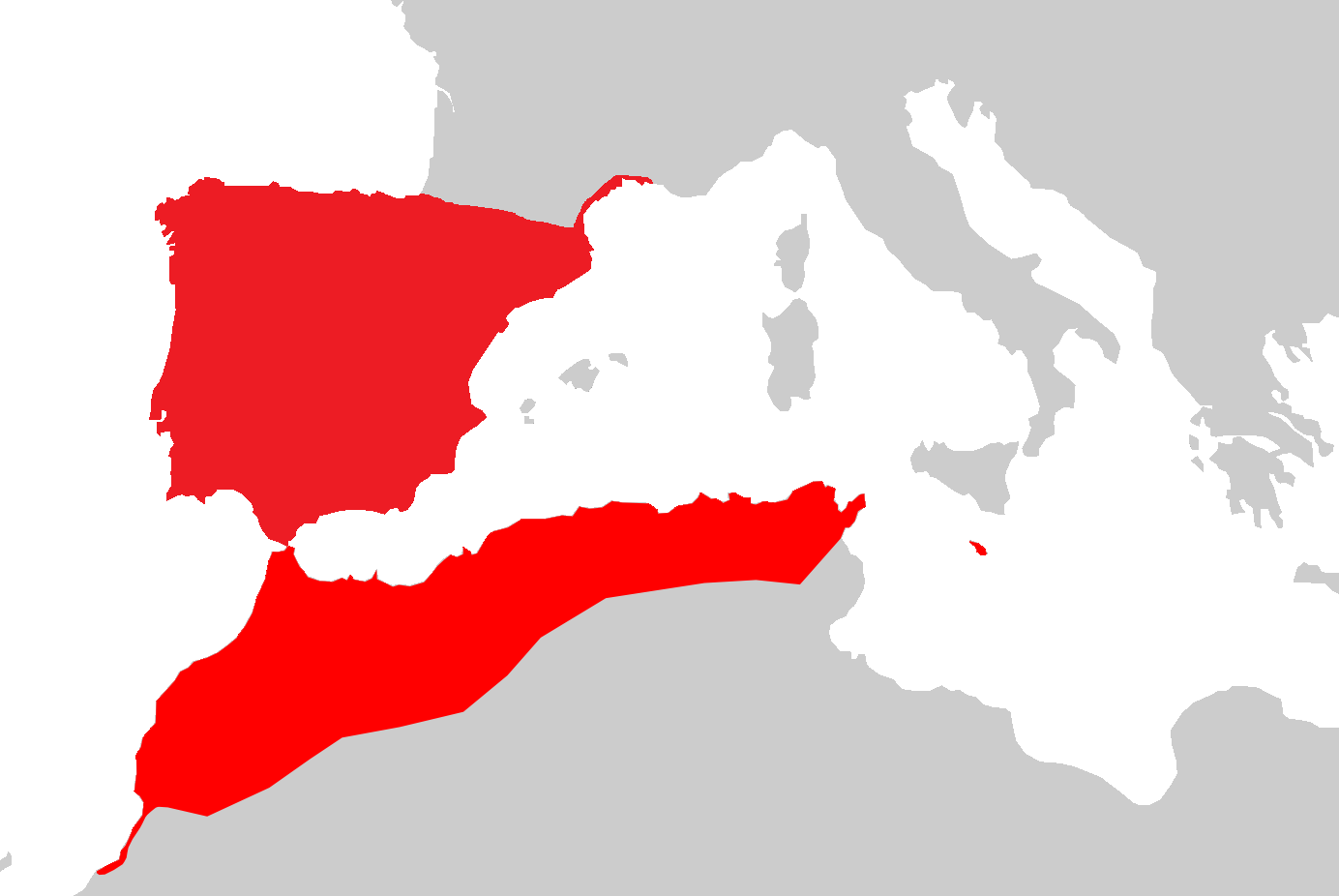
- Range

Synonyms
- Lacerta algira Linnaeus, 1758; Tropidosaura algira — A.M.C. Duméril & Bibron, 1839; Algira (Tropidosaura) algira — Boettger, 1885; Psammodromus algirus — Boulenger, 1887; Pantodactylus nicefori C. Burt & M. Burt, 1931; Psammodromus manuelae Busack, Salvador & Lawson, 2006; Psammodromus jeanneae Busack, Salvador & Lawson, 2006; Psammodromus algirus — Mendes et al., 2017

= Psammodromus algirus =

Species of lizard

Psammodromus algirus, known commonly as the Algerian psammodromus or the large psammodromus, is a species of lizard in the family Lacertidae. The species is found in southwestern Europe and northwestern Africa.

== Subspecies ==
There are four subspecies:

- Psammodromus algirus algirus (Linnaeus, 1758)
- Psammodromus algirus doriae Bedriaga, 1886
- Psammodromus algirus nollii Fischer, 1887
- Psammodromus algirus ketamensis Galán, 1931

== Geographic range ==
Psammodromus algirus is found in North Africa (Morocco, Algeria, and Tunisia) and in Southwestern Europe (Iberian Peninsula: Portugal, Spain, Andorra, Gibraltar; southernmost France, and Italy near Lampedusa).

The IUCN assessment from 2009 treats Psammodromus algirus nollii and Psammodromus algirus ketamensis as full species and restricts Psammodromus algirus to North Africa.

== Habitat ==
Psammodromus algirus typically occurs in dense bushy vegetation, but it can also venture to more open areas. It can be found at elevations up to 2,600 m (8,500 ft) above sea level, but it is more common at lower elevations.

== Diet ==
Psammodromus algirus preys mainly on terrestrial arthropods, specifically Orthoptera, Formicidae, Coleoptera, Hemiptera, and Araneae.

== Conservation status ==
Psammodromus algirus is threatened by habitat loss.

== Description ==
Ppsammodromus algirus commonly reaches a snout-to-vent length (SVL) of about 7.5 cm (3.0 in), occasionally 9 cm (3.5 in). The tail is 2–3 times the body length. Dorsal colouration is usually metallic brownish with a pair of conspicuous white or yellowish stripes on both sides.
