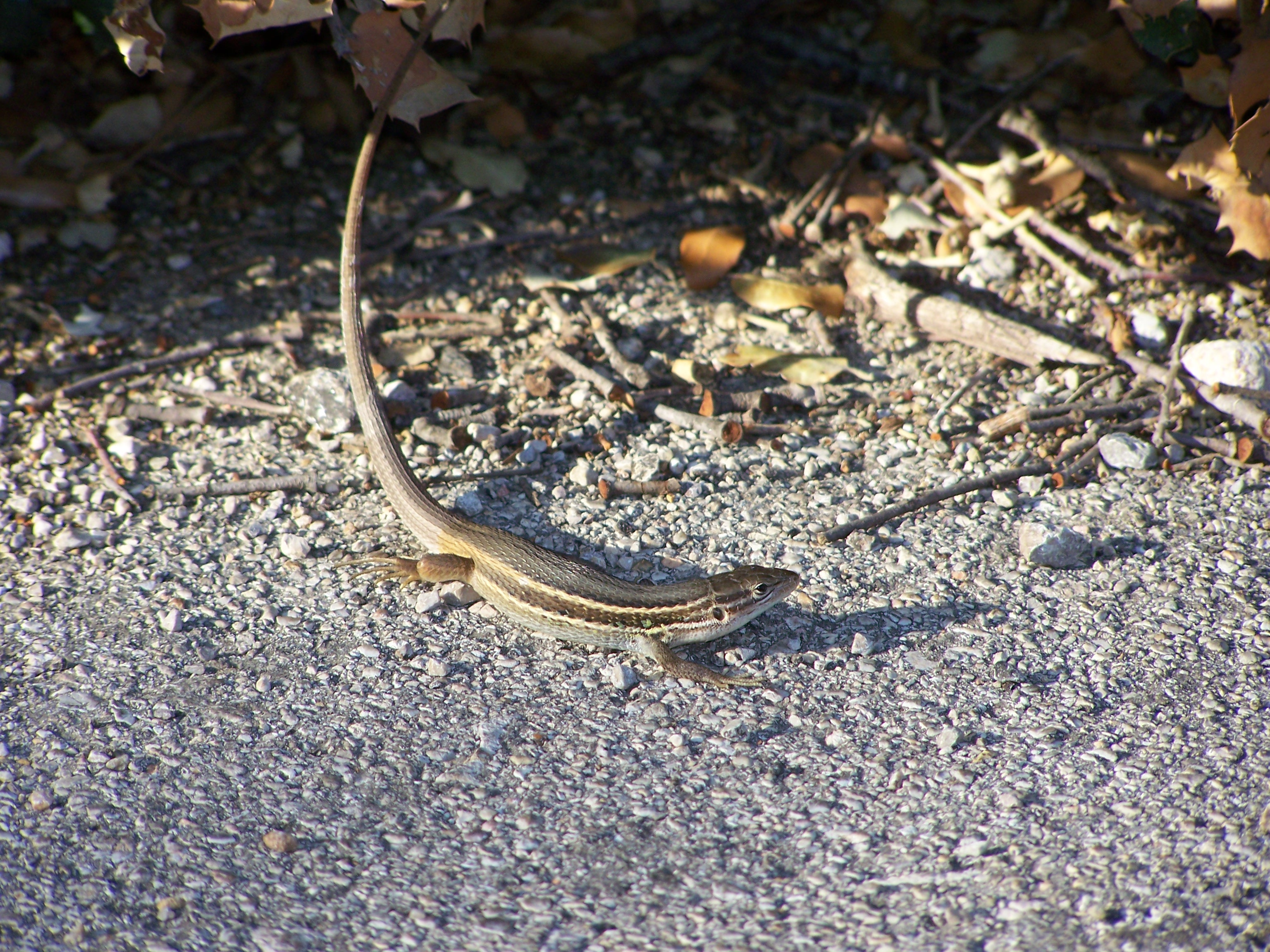
- Psammodromus algirus

Scientific classification
- Kingdom: Animalia
- Phylum: Chordata
- Class: Reptilia
- Order: Squamata
- Family: Lacertidae
- Subfamily: Gallotiinae
- Genus: Psammodromus; Fitzinger, 1826

Species
- Six recognized species, see article.

= Psammodromus =

Genus of lizards

Psammodromus is a small genus of sand lizards of the family Lacertidae. It has six described species, which are found in European and North African countries next to the Mediterranean.

== Species ==
The following species are recognized as being valid.

- Psammodromus algirus (Linnaeus, 1758) - large psammodromus, Algerian psammodromus, Algerian sand racer
- Psammodromus blanci (Lataste, 1880) - Blanc's sand racer, Blanc's psammodromus
- Psammodromus edwarsianus (Dugès, 1829) - East Iberian sand racer, East Iberian psammodromus
- Psammodromus hispanicus Fitzinger, 1826 – Spanish psammodromus
- Psammodromus jeanneae
- Psammodromus manuelae
- Psammodromus microdactylus (Boettger, 1881) – small-fingered psammodromus, green psammodromus
- Psammodromus occidentalis Fitze et al., 2012

Nota bene: A binomial authority in parentheses indicates that the species was originally described in a genus other than Psammodromus.
