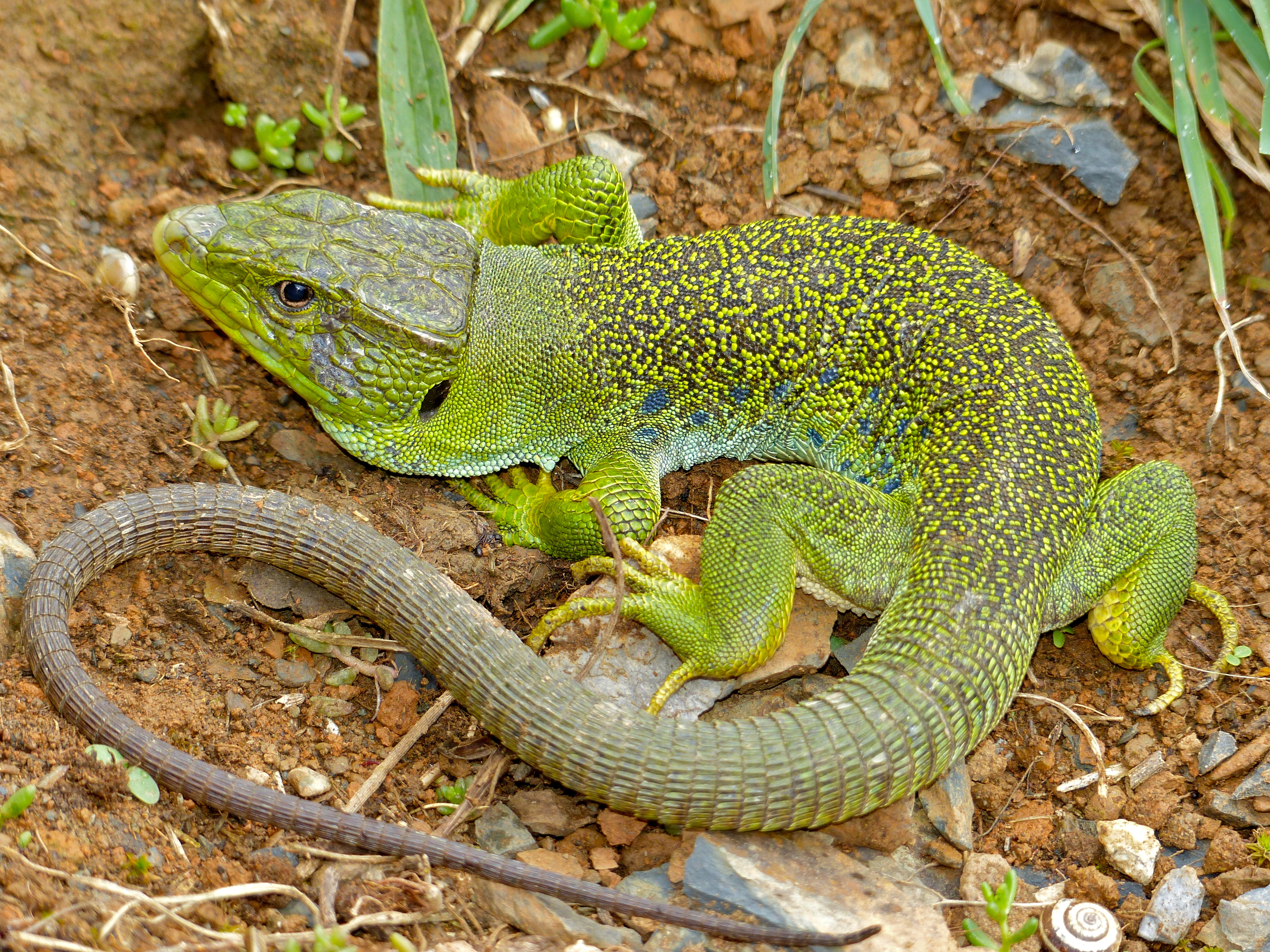
- Male
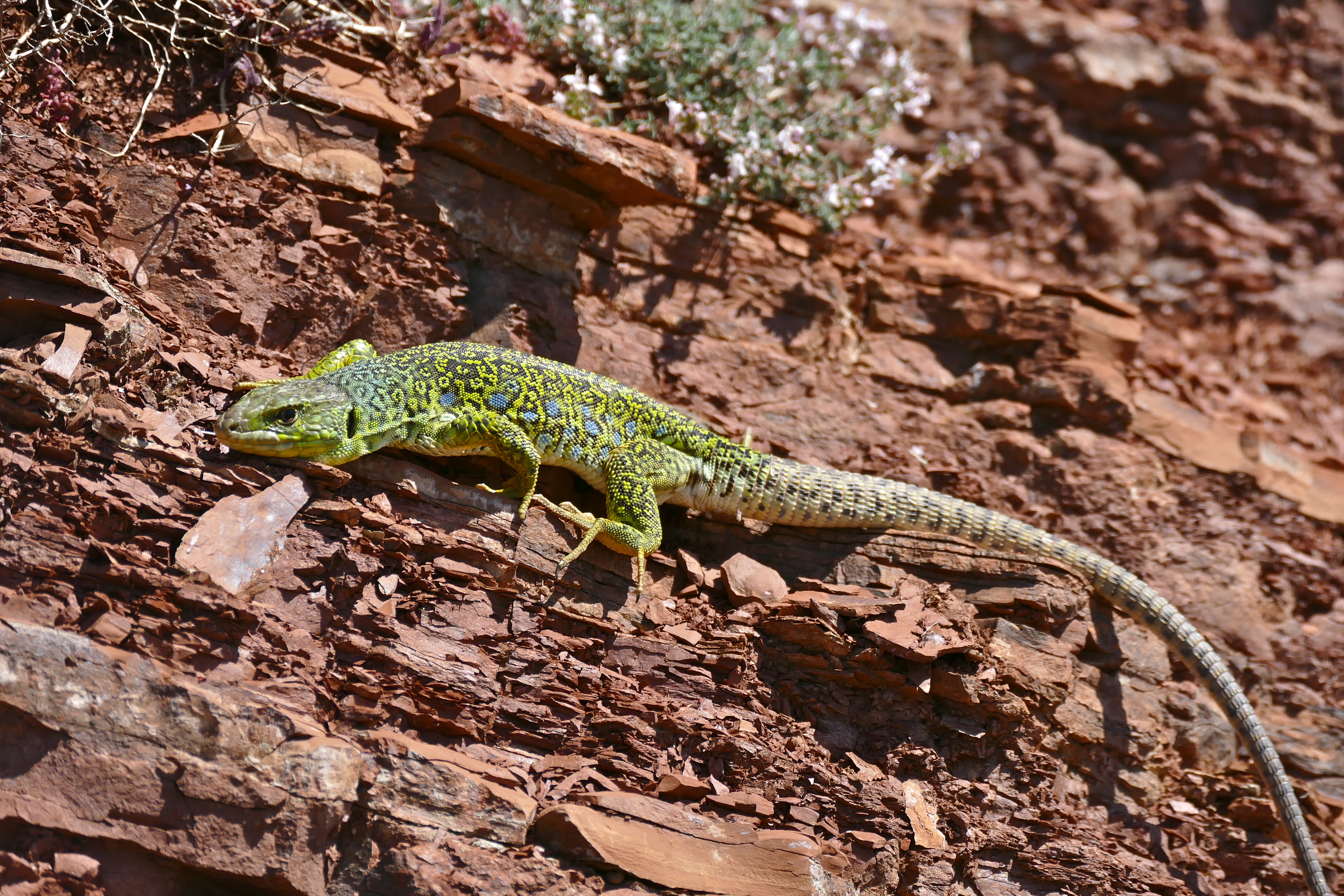
- Female

Conservation status
- Least Concern (IUCN 3.1)

Scientific classification
- Kingdom: Animalia
- Phylum: Chordata
- Class: Reptilia
- Order: Squamata
- Family: Lacertidae
- Genus: Timon
- Species: T. lepidus

Binomial name
- Timon lepidus (Daudin, 1802)

Subspecies
- T. l. ibericus (López-Seoane, 1884); T. l. lepidus (Daudin, 1802); T. l. oteroi (Castroviejo & Mateo, 1998)
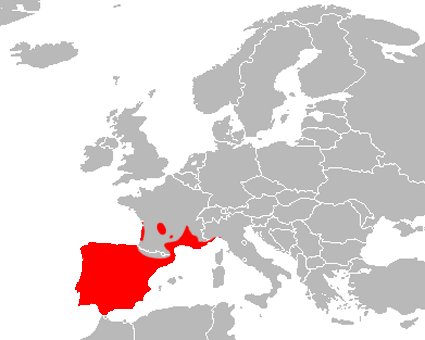

Synonyms
- List: Lacerta lepida Daudin, 1802; Lacerta ocellata Daudin, 1802; Lacerta ocellata — A.M.C. Duméril & Bibron, 1839; Lacerta lepida — Bischoff et al., 1984; Timon lepidus — Mayer & Bischoff, 1996

= Ocellated lizard =

Species of lizard

The ocellated lizard or jewelled lizard (Timon lepidus) is a species of lizard in the family Lacertidae (wall lizards). The species is endemic to southwestern Europe.

== Common names ==
Additional common names for T. lepidus include eyed lizard and jeweled lacerta (in the pet trade).

== Description ==
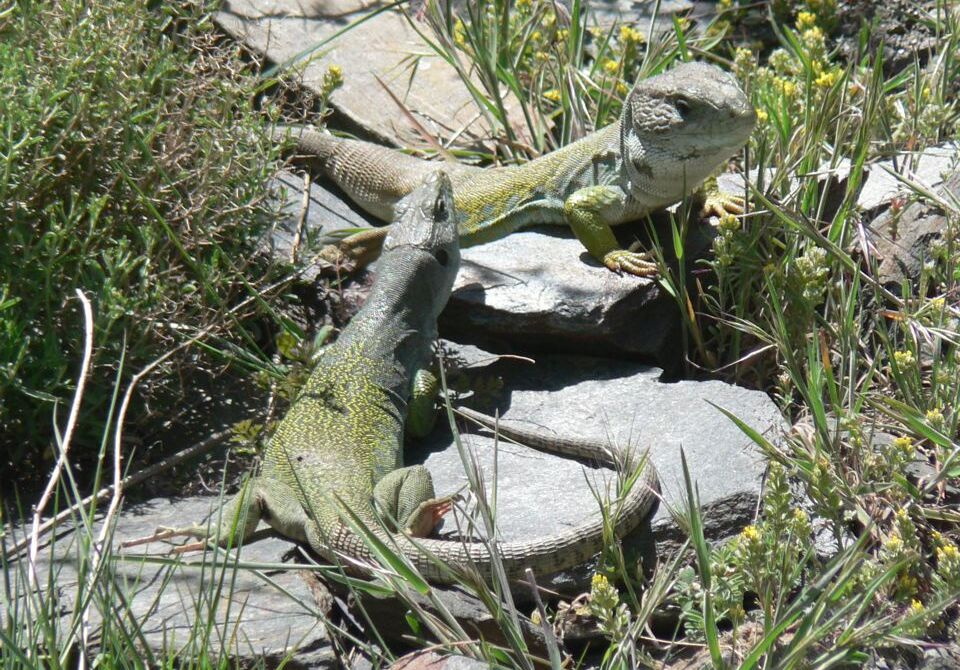
Male and female courting.

Timon lepidus is one of the largest members of its family. Adults are 30 to 60 cm (0.98 to 1.97 ft) in total length (including tail) and may reach up to 90 cm (3.0 ft), weighing more than 0.5 kg (1.1 lb). About two-thirds of its length is tail. Newly hatched young are 4 to 5 cm (1.5 to 2 in) long, excluding tail.

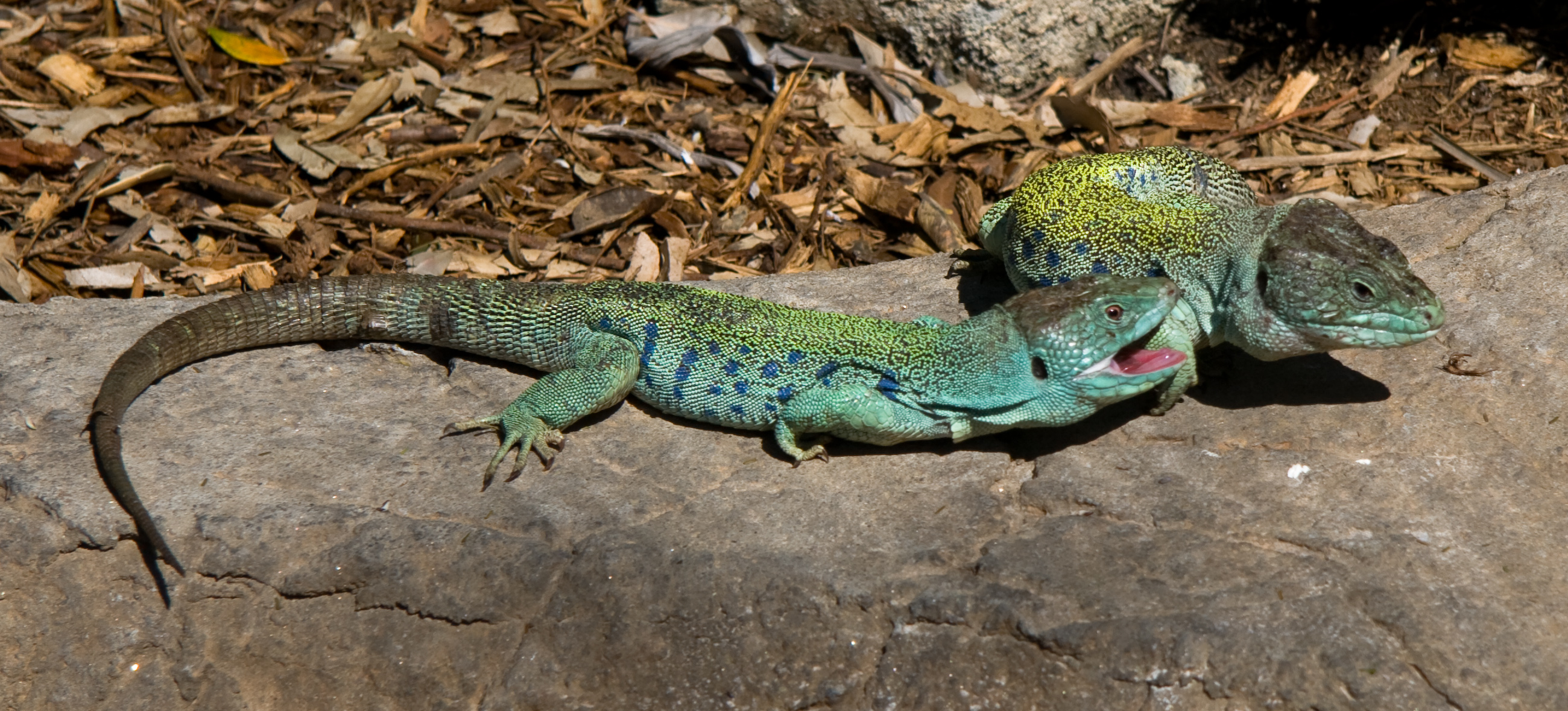
At the San Diego Zoo

This is a robust lizard with a serrated collar. The male has a characteristic broad head. It has thick, strong legs, with long, curved claws. The dorsal background colour is usually green, but sometimes grey or brownish, especially on the head and tail. This is overlaid with black stippling that may form a bold pattern of interconnected rosettes. The underside is yellowish or greenish, with both the male and female sporting bright blue spots along the flanks, though the male is typically brighter in colour than the female. Young are green, grey, or brown, with yellowish or white spots (often black-edged) all over.

== Geographic range ==
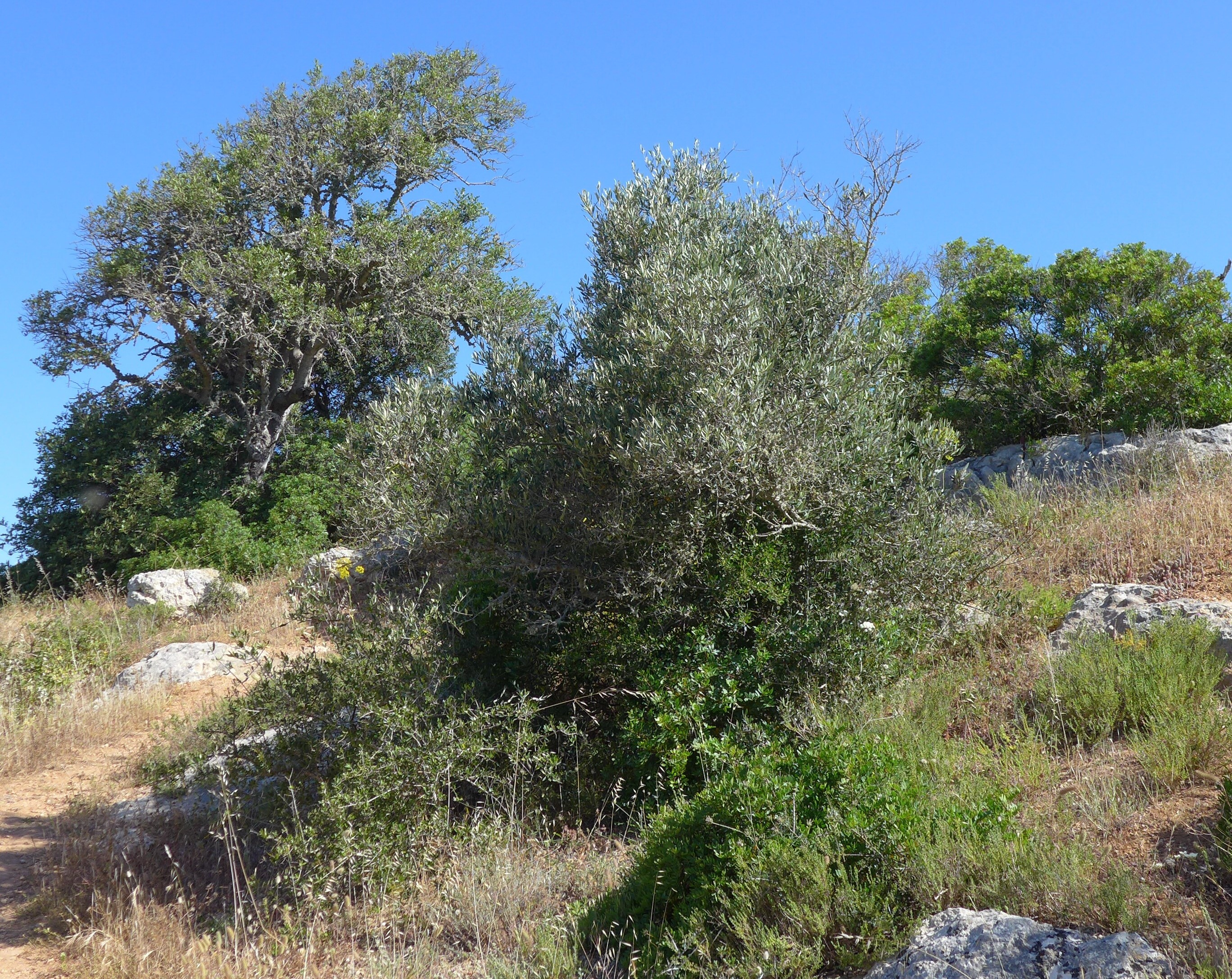
Habitat in Portugal

Timon lepidus is native to southwestern Europe. It is found throughout the Iberian peninsula (Spain, Portugal, [north African] Gibraltar), and is patchily distributed in southern France and extreme northwestern Italy. It is also found in northwest Tunisia within the forests of Ain Soltane and El Feija in Ghardimaou, Jendouba. The range for each subspecies is:

- Timon lepidus ibericus - northwestern Iberian Peninsula (Spain and Portugal)
- Timon lepidus lepidus
- Timon lepidus oteroi

== Ecology ==
Timon lepidus is found in various wild and cultivated habitats from sea level up to 2,100 m (6,900 ft) in southern Spain. It is rare at higher altitudes. It prefers dry, bushy areas, such as open woodland and scrub, old olive groves and vineyards, and is sometimes found on more open, rocky or sandy areas. It can occasionally be seen basking on roadsides. The lizard usually stays on the ground, but climbs well on rocks and in trees. It can dig holes and sometimes uses abandoned rabbit burrows.

== Diet ==
Timon lepidus feeds mainly on large insects, especially beetles, spiders, and snails, and also robs birds' nests for eggs and nestlings and occasionally takes reptiles (other lizards and small snakes), frogs, and small mammals. It also eats fruit (such as berries) and other plant matter, especially in dry areas.

== Reproduction ==
Breeding in T. lepidus occurs in late spring or early summer. Males are territorial in spring and fight in the breeding season. The female lays up to 22 eggs in June and July about three months after mating, hiding them under stones and logs or in leaf litter or in loose damp soil. It tends to lay fewer, larger eggs in dry areas. The eggs hatch in eight to 14 weeks. The lizard is sexually mature at two years of age.

== Conservation ==
As of 2024, Timon lepidus is listed as Least Concern on The IUCN Red List of Threatened Species. As of 2011 the species has been under protection in Spain; capture and trade is forbidden.

== Gallery ==
Group in captivity

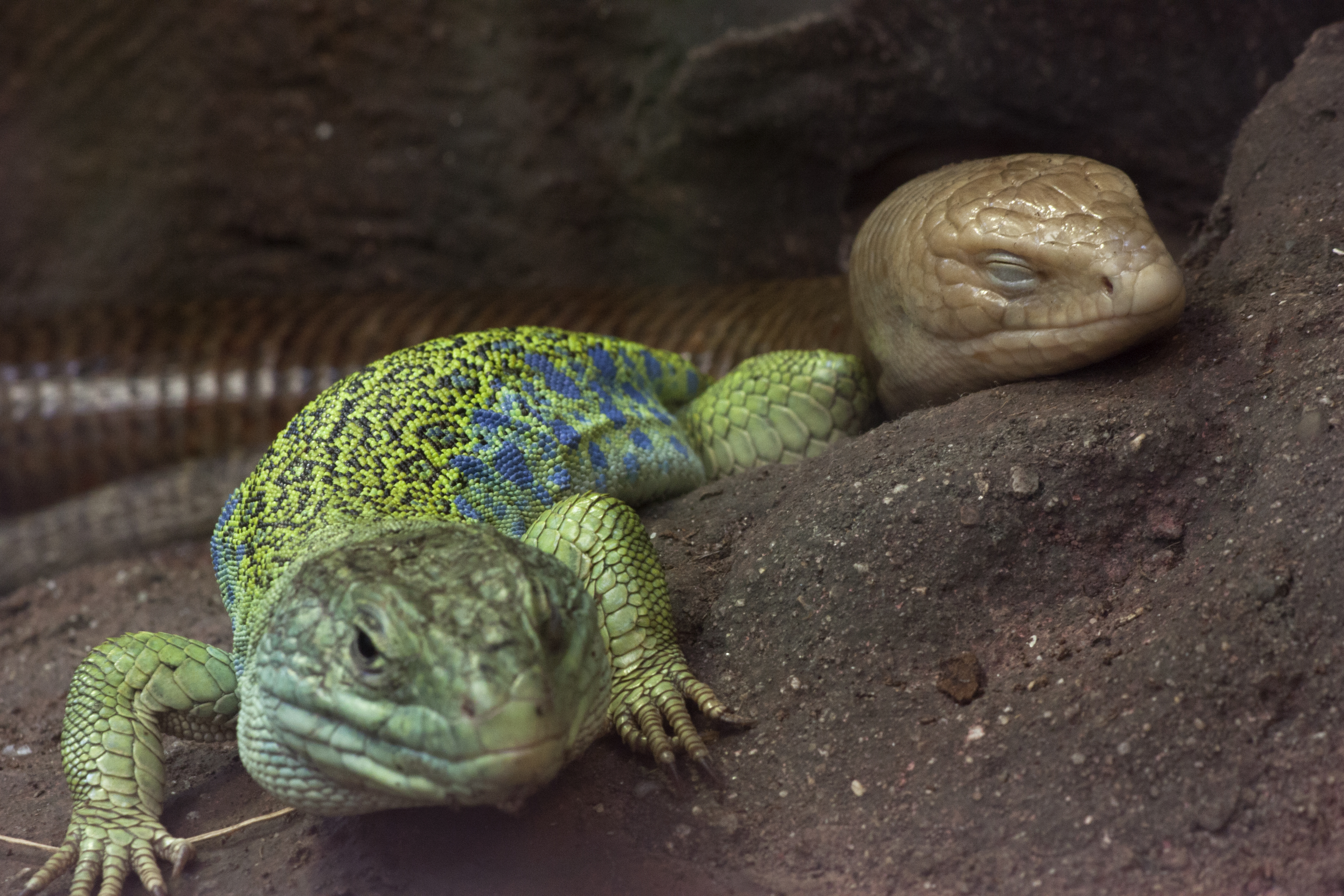
With a sheltopusik, at the Artis Royal Zoo
