= Smooth snake (disambiguation) =

The smooth snake (Coronella austriaca) is a species of non-venomous snake found in northern and central Europe.

Smooth snake may also refer to:

- Coronella, a genus of harmless snakes in the family Colubridae:
  - Coronella austriaca fitzingeri, a subspecies of Coronella austriaca that lives in southern Italy and Sicily
  - Indian smooth snake (Coronella brachyura), a species of rare harmless snake
  - Southern smooth snake (Coronella girondica), found in southern Europe and northern Africa

== See also ==
- False smooth snake (Macroprotodon cucullatus), a species of mildly venomous colubrid snake
- Western false smooth snake or Iberian false smooth snake (Macroprotodon brevis), a species of snake in the family Colubridae
- Smooth green snake (Opheodrys vernalis), a species of North American non-venomous snake in the family Colubridae
