= List of amphibians and reptiles of Gibraltar =

This is a list of the amphibian and reptile species recorded in Gibraltar. There are five amphibian and twenty-five reptile species in Gibraltar, of which one is critically endangered, two are endangered, one is vulnerable, and three are near threatened.

The following tags are used to highlight each species' conservation status as assessed by the International Union for Conservation of Nature:

EX	Extinct	No reasonable doubt that the last individual has died.
EW	Extinct in the wild	Known only to survive in captivity or as a naturalized populations well outside its previous range.
CR	Critically endangered	The species is in imminent risk of extinction in the wild.
EN	Endangered	The species is facing an extremely high risk of extinction in the wild.
VU	Vulnerable	The species is facing a high risk of extinction in the wild.
NT	Near threatened	The species does not meet any of the criteria that would categorise it as risking extinction but it is likely to do so in the future.
LC	Least concern	There are no current identifiable risks to the species.
DD	Data deficient	There is inadequate information to make an assessment of the risks to this species.

Some species were assessed using an earlier set of criteria. Species assessed using this system have the following instead of near threatened and least concern categories:

LR/cd	Lower risk/conservation dependent	Species which were the focus of conservation programmes and may have moved into a higher risk category if that programme was discontinued.
LR/nt	Lower risk/near threatened	Species which are close to being classified as vulnerable but are not the subject of conservation programmes.
LR/lc	Lower risk/least concern	Species for which there are no identifiable risks.

== Class: Amphibia ==
=== Order: Caudata (salamanders) ===
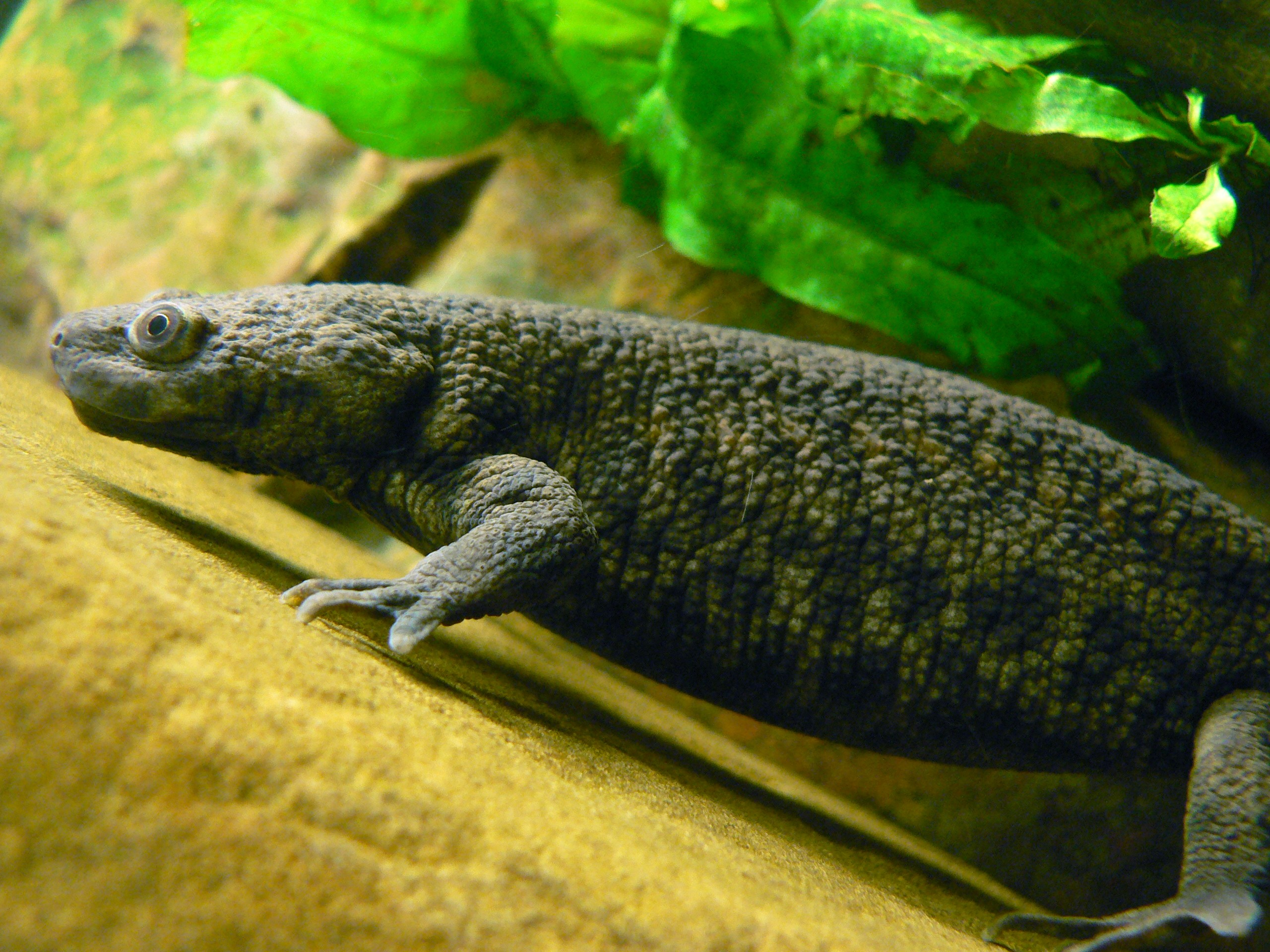
An Iberian ribbed newt

- Family: Salamandridae (newts)
  - Genus: Pleurodeles
    - Iberian ribbed newt, Pleurodeles waltl ^{NT}

=== Order: Anura (frogs and toads) ===
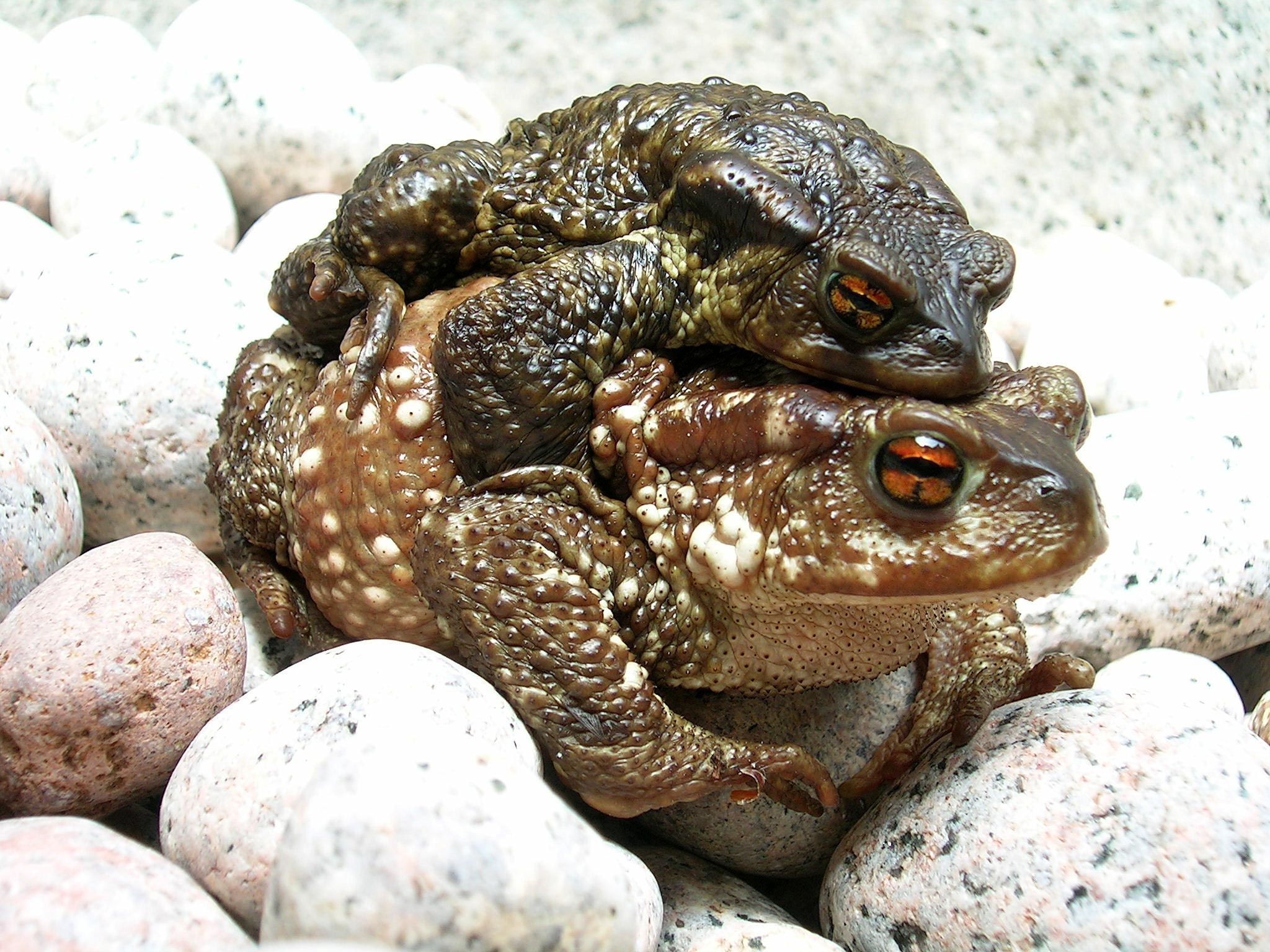
A pair of common toads

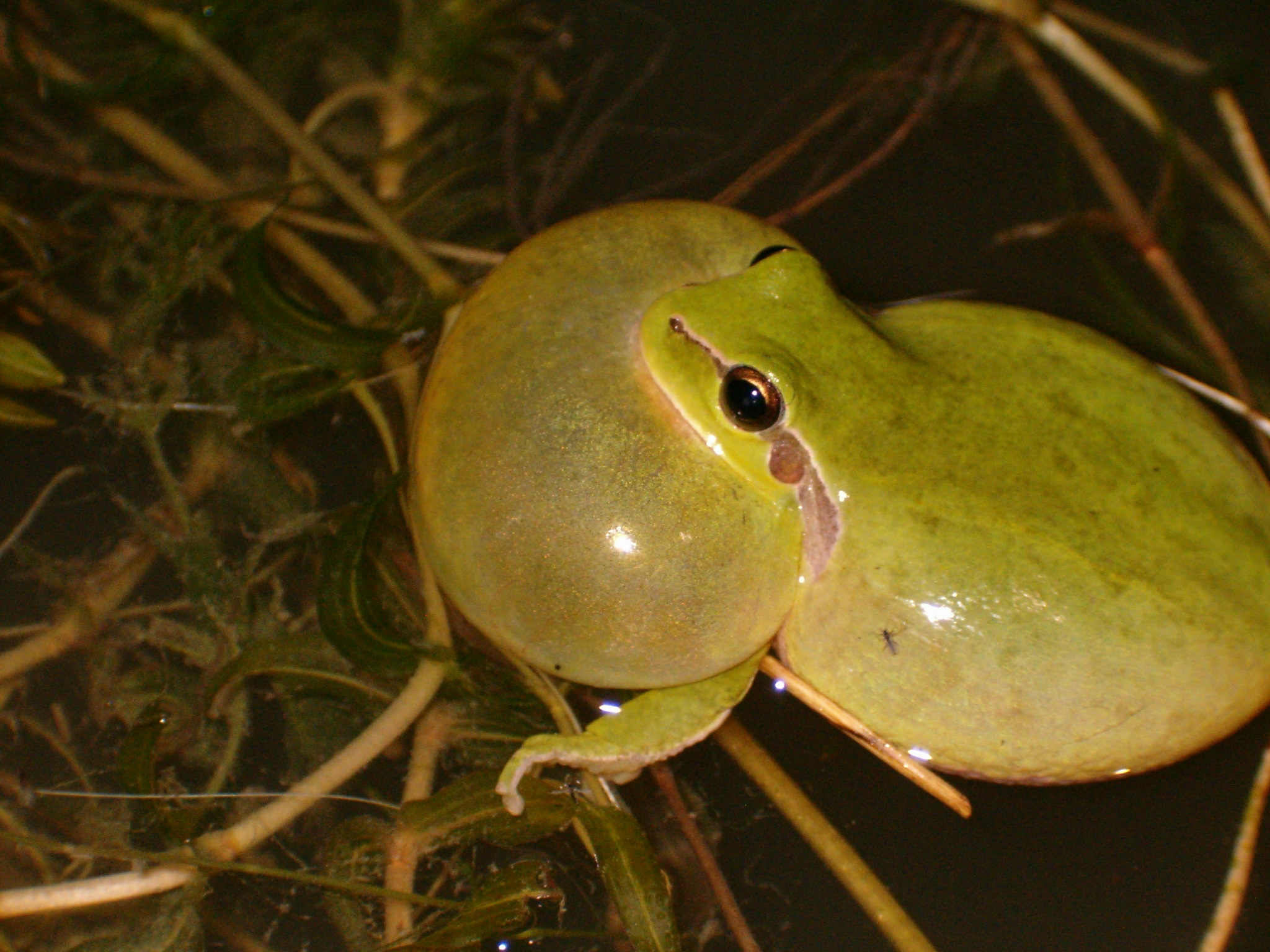
A Mediterranean tree frog

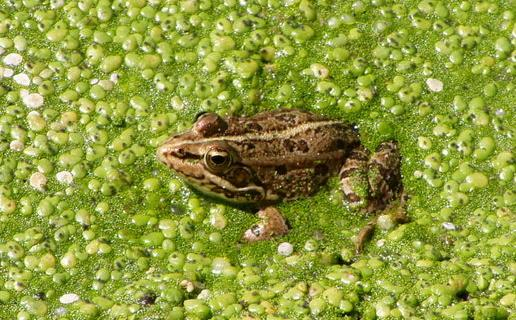
Perez's frog in a pond

- Suborder: Mesobatrachia
  - Family: Pelobatidae
    - Genus: Pelobates
      - Western spadefoot toad, Pelobates cultripes
  - Family: Bufonidae
    - Genus: Bufo
      - Common toad, Bufo bufo ^{LC}
  - Family: Hylidae
    - Genus: Hyla
      - Mediterranean tree frog, Hyla meridionalis ^{LC}
  - Family: Ranidae
    - Genus: Rana
      - Perez's frog, Rana perezi ^{LC}

== Class: Reptilia ==
=== Order: Testudines (turtles, tortoises and terrapins) ===
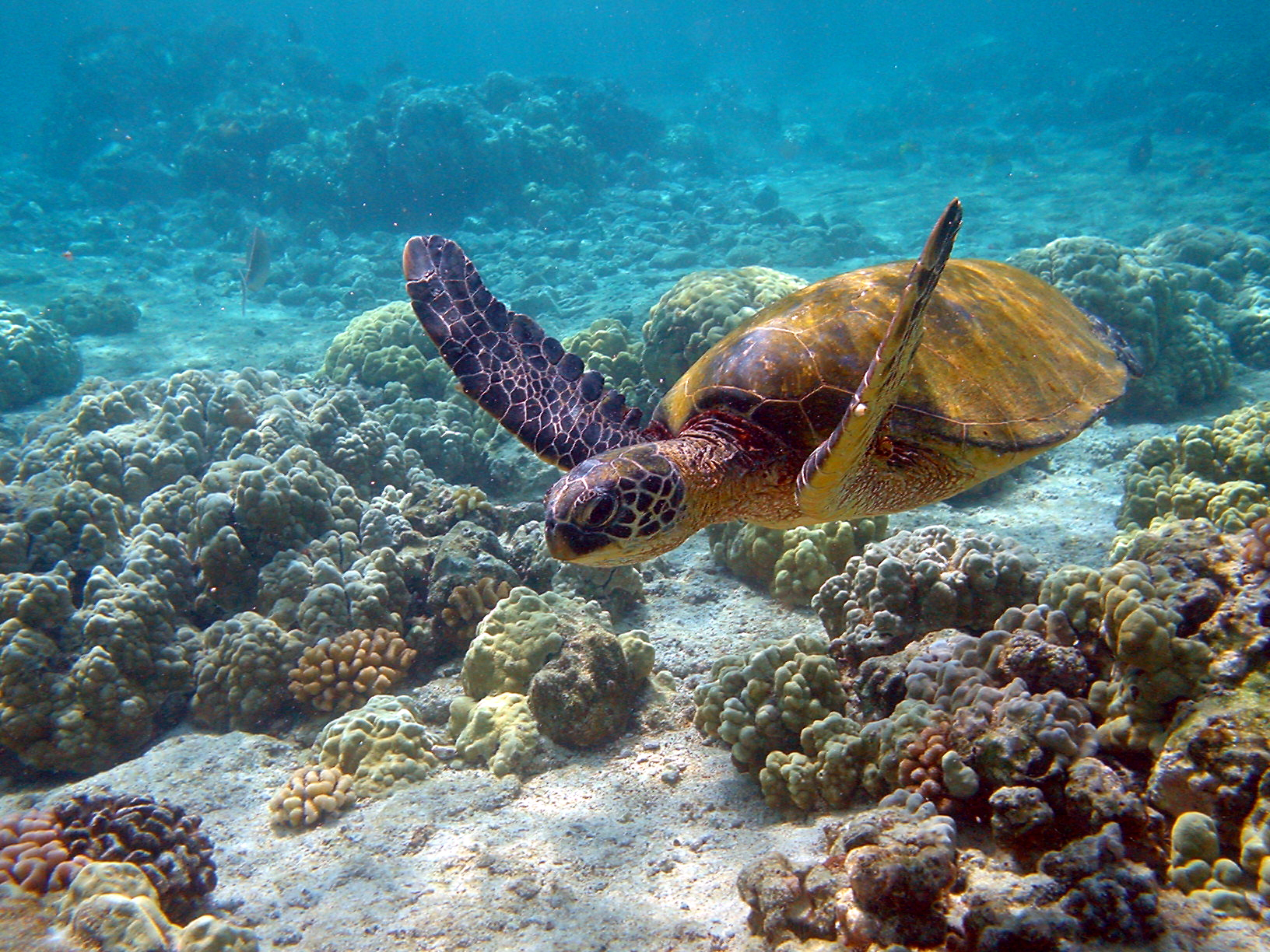
A green turtle

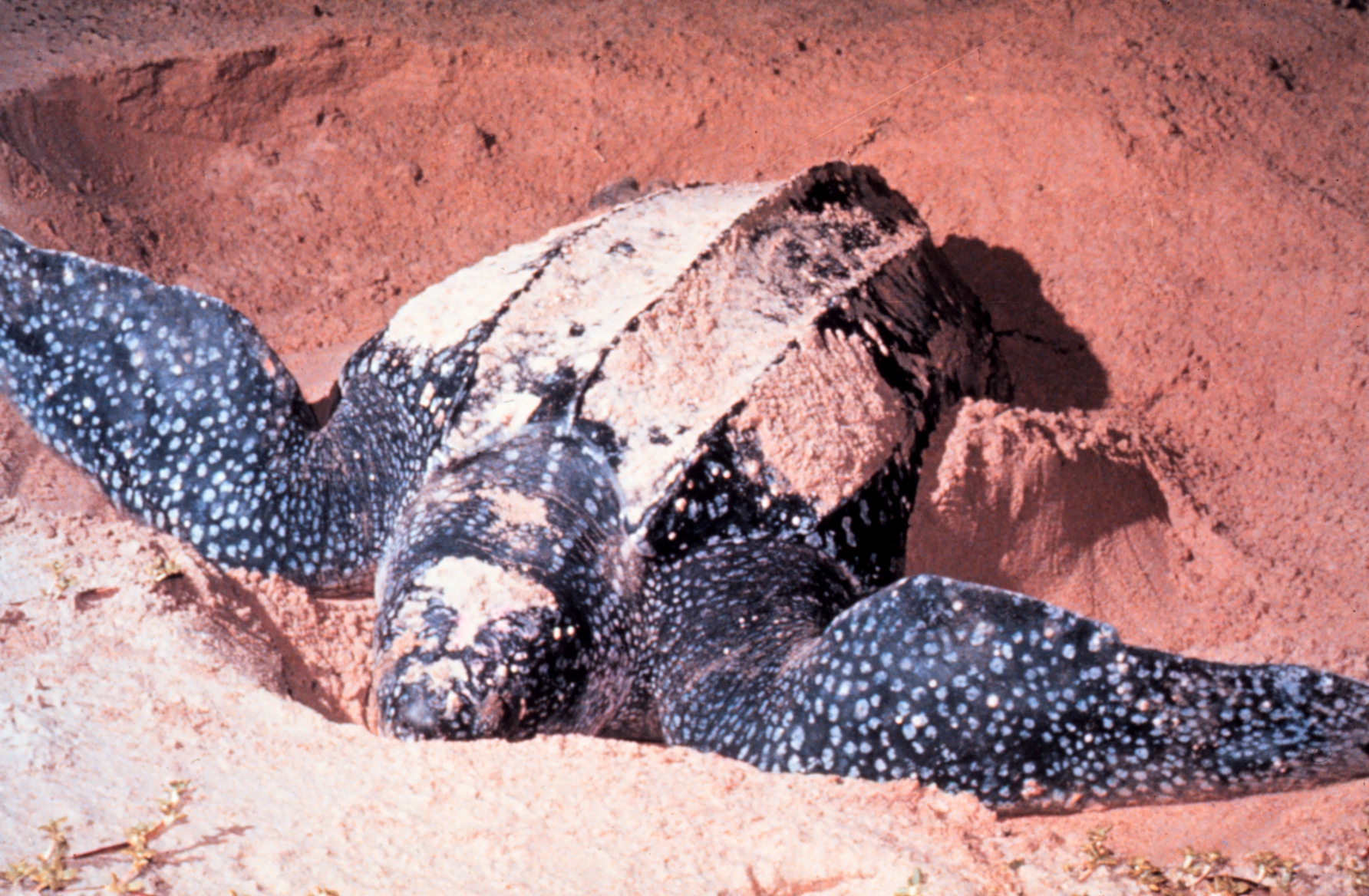
A leatherback turtle

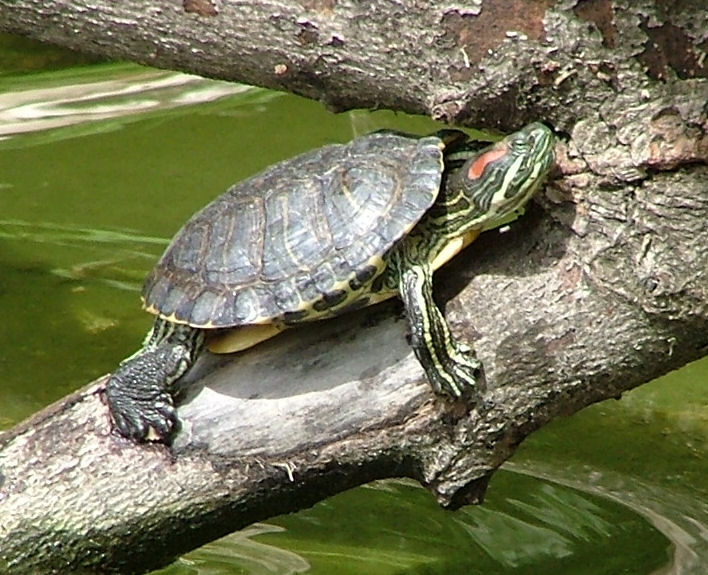
A red-eared slider

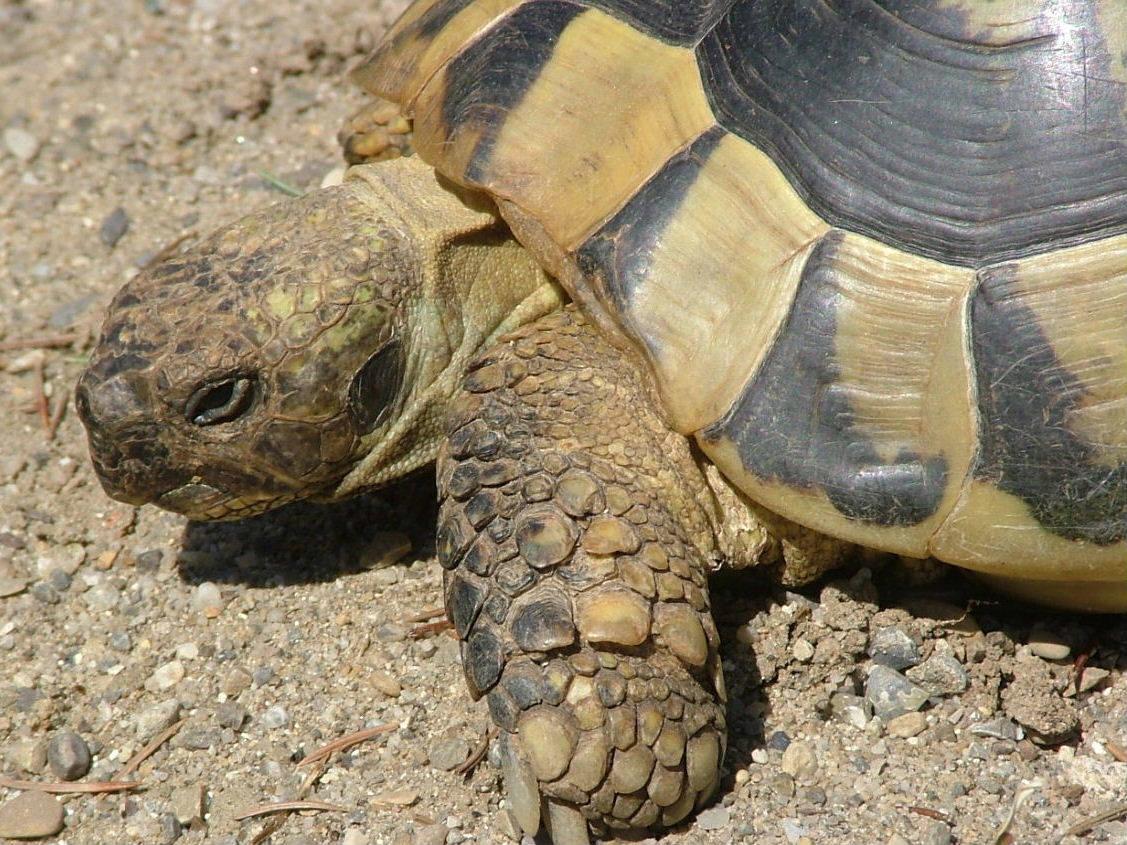
A spur-thighed tortoise

  - Family: Cheloniidae
    - Genus: Caretta
      - Loggerhead sea turtle, Caretta caretta ^{EN}
    - Genus: Chelonia
      - Green turtle, Chelonia mydas ^{EN}
  - Family: Dermochelyidae
    - Genus: Dermochelys
      - Leatherback turtle, Dermochelys coriacea ^{CR}
  - Family: Emydidae
    - Genus: Emys
      - European pond terrapin, Emys orbicularis ^{LR/nt}
    - Genus: Trachemys
      - Red-eared slider, Trachemys scripta ^{LC}
- Suborder: Cryptodira
  - Superfamily: Testudinoidea
    - Family: Geoemydidae
      - Subfamily: Geoemydinae
        - Genus: Mauremys
          - Mediterranean pond turtle, Mauremys leprosa
  - Family: Testudinidae
    - Genus: Testudo
      - Spur-thighed tortoise, Testudo graeca ^{VU}

=== Order: Squamata (scaled reptiles) ===
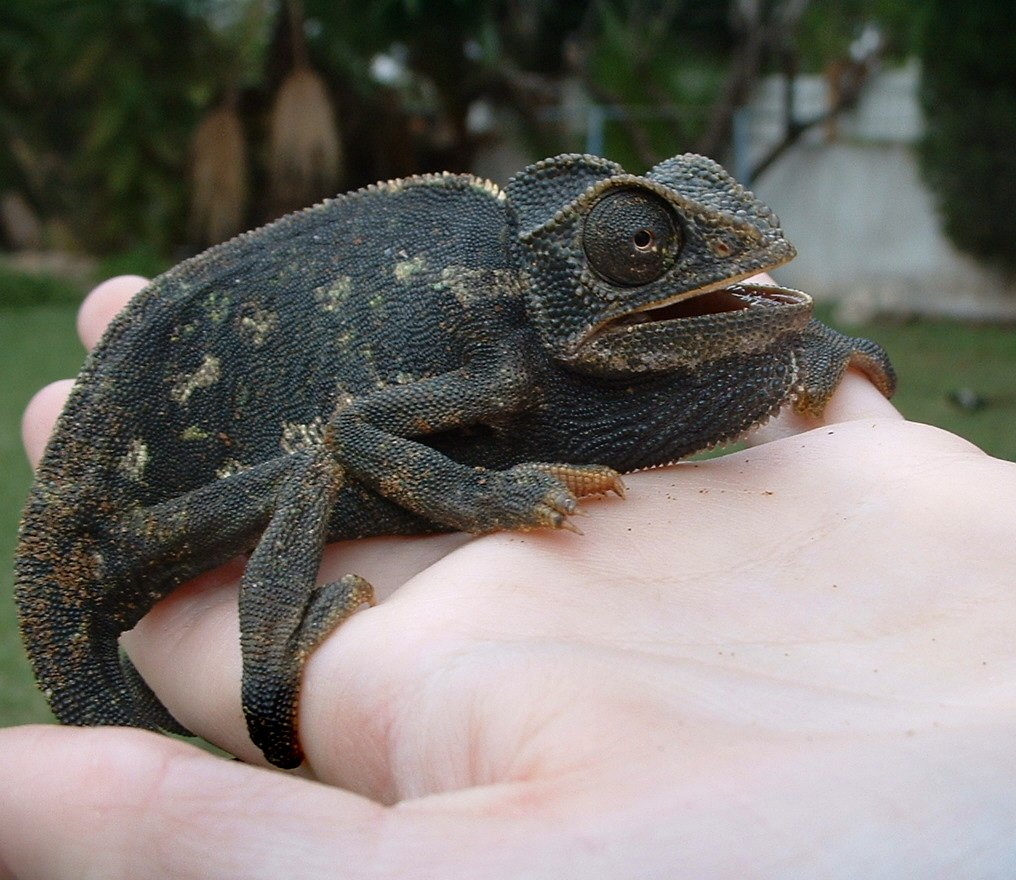
A common chameleon

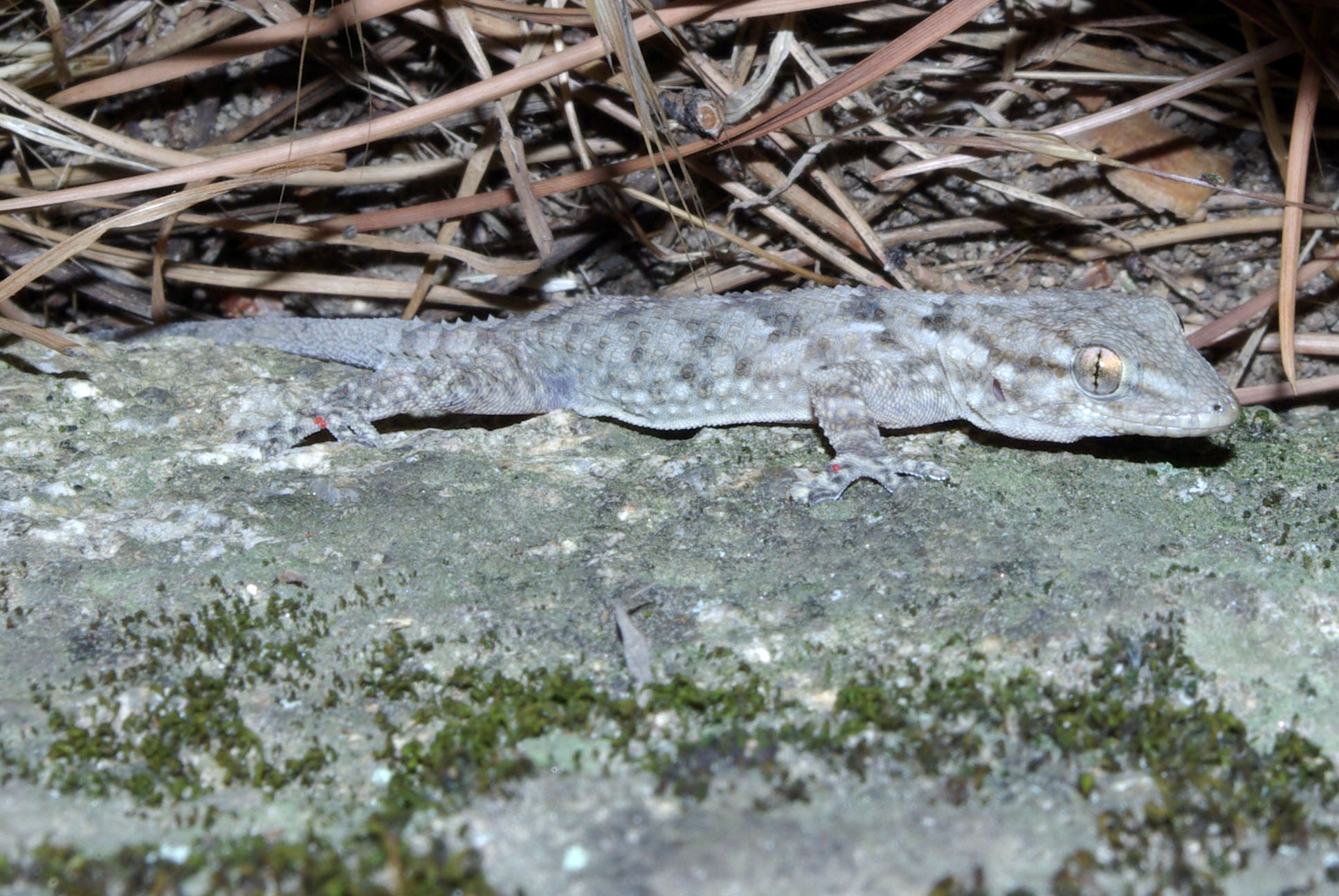
A Moorish gecko

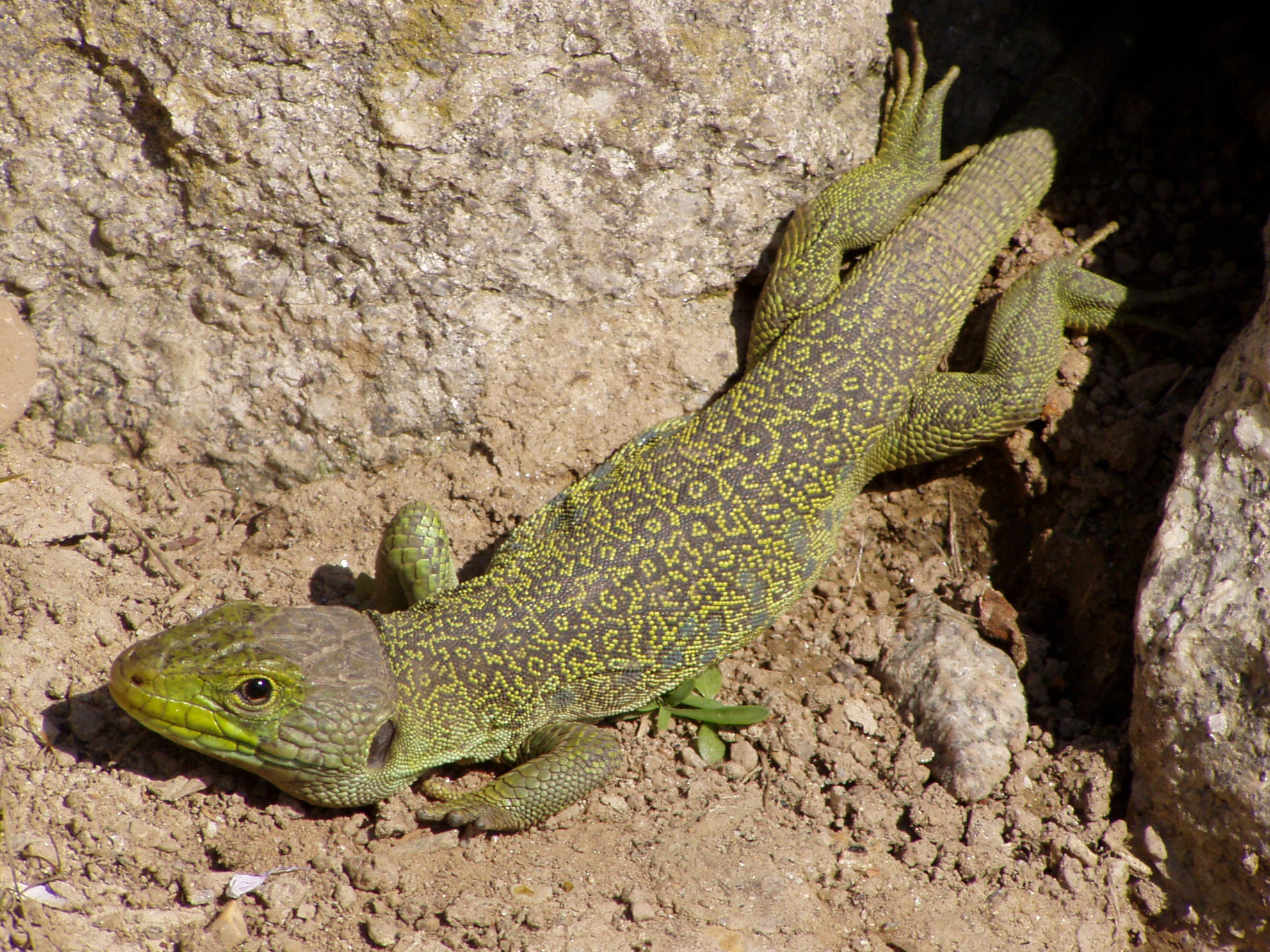
An ocellated lizard

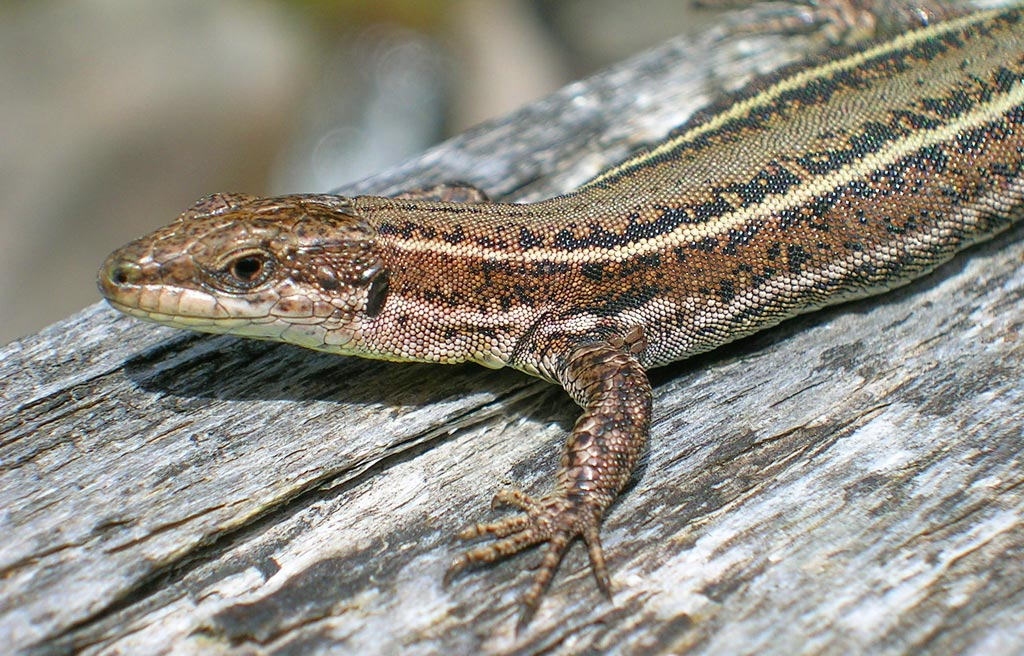
An Iberian wall lizard

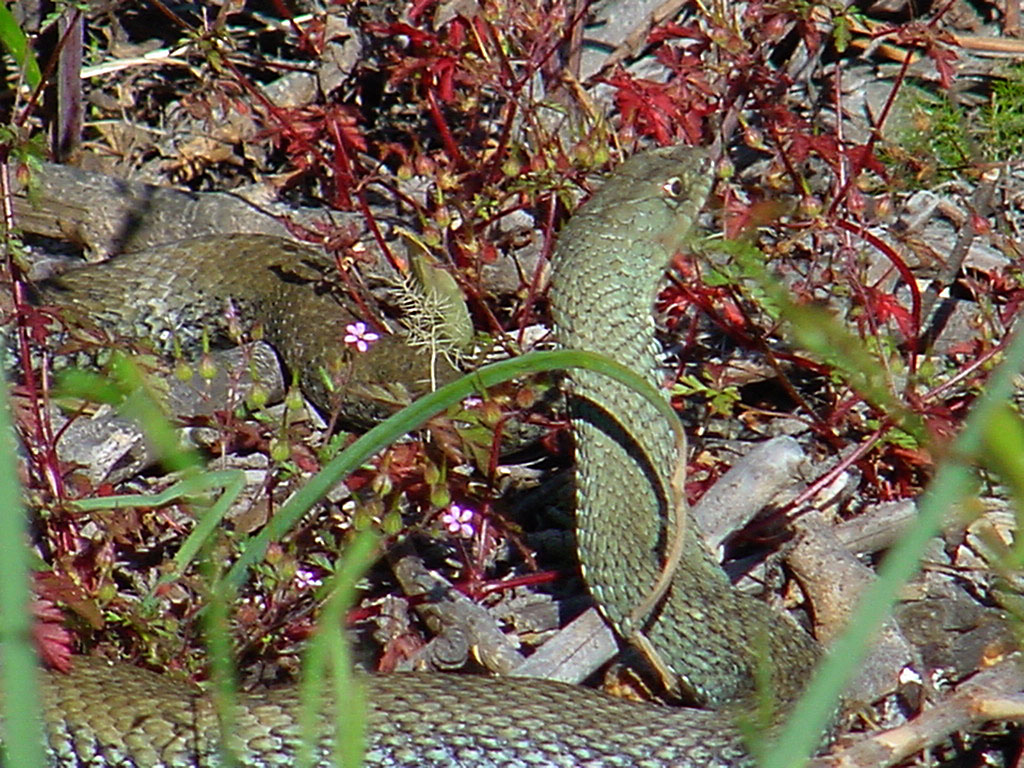
A Montpellier snake

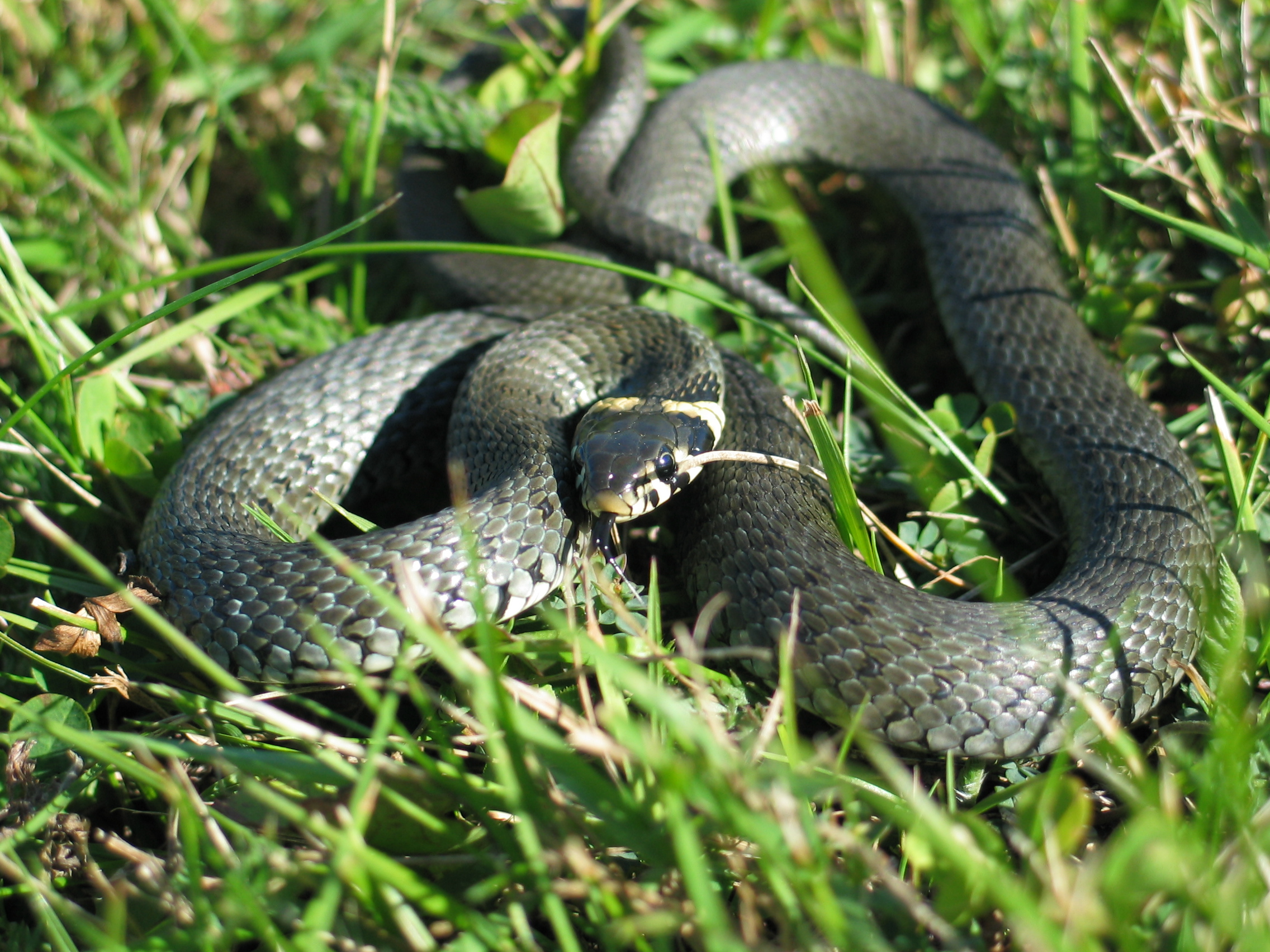
A grass snake

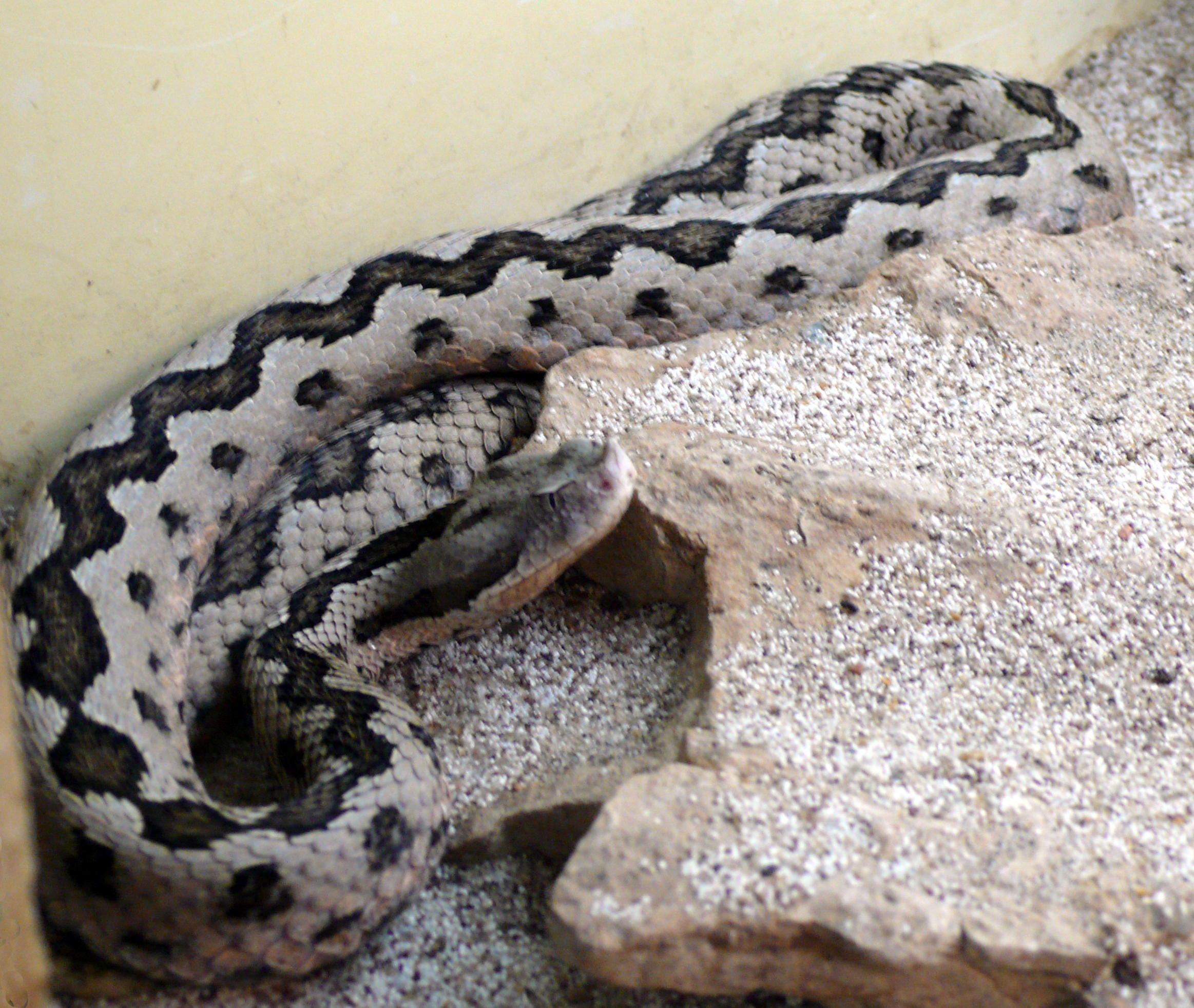
A Lataste's viper

- Suborder: Sauria
  - Family: Chamaeleonidae
    - Genus: Chamaeleo
      - Common chameleon, Chamaeleo chamaeleon
  - Family: Gekkonidae
    - Genus: Hemidactylus
      - Mediterranean house gecko, Hemidactylus turcicus
    - Genus: Tarentola
      - Moorish gecko, Tarentola mauritanica
  - Family: Scincidae (skinks)
    - Genus: Chalcides
      - Bedriaga's skink, Chalcides bedriagai ^{NT}
      - Western three-toed skink, Chalcides striatus ^{LC}
  - Family: Lacertidae (wall lizards)
    - Genus: Acanthodactylus
      - Red-tailed spiny-footed lizard, Acanthodactylus erythrurus ^{LC}
    - Genus: Timon
      - Ocellated lizard, Timon lepidus
    - Genus: Podarcis
      - Iberian wall lizard, Podarcis hispanica
    - Genus: Psammodromus
      - Algerian sand racer, Psammodromus algirus ^{LC}
  - Family: Amphisbaenidae (worm lizards)
    - Genus: Blanus
      - Iberian worm lizard, Blanus cinereus ^{LC}
- Suborder: Serpentes (snakes)
  - Family: Colubridae
    - Genus: Hemorrhois
      - Horseshoe whip snake, Hemorrhois hippocrepis ^{LC}
    - Genus: Coronella
      - Southern smooth snake, Coronella girondica ^{LC}
    - Genus: Rhinechis
      - Ladder snake, Rhinechis scalaris ^{LC}
    - Genus: Malpolon
      - Montpellier snake, Malpolon monspessulanus
    - Genus: Macroprotodon
      - Western false smooth snake, Macroprotodon brevis ^{NT}
    - Genus: Natrix
      - Viperine snake, Natrix maura
      - Grass snake, Natrix natrix
  - Family: Viperidae
    - Genus: Vipera
      - Lataste's viper, Vipera latastei ^{LC}

== See also ==
- List of birds of Gibraltar
- List of mammals of Gibraltar
