= Coronella austriaca fitzingeri =

Scientific classification
- Domain: Eukaryota
- Kingdom: Animalia
- Phylum: Chordata
- Class: Reptilia
- Order: Squamata
- Suborder: Serpentes
- Family: Colubridae
- Genus: Coronella
- Species: C. austriaca
- Subspecies: C. a. fitzingeri

Trinomial name
- Coronella austriaca fitzingeri Laurenti, 1768

Subspecies of snake

Coronella austriaca fitzingeri is a subspecies of the snake Coronella austriaca (commonly known as the smooth snake). It lives in southern Italy and Sicily.
