= Macroprotodon abubakeri =

Conservation status
- Least Concern (IUCN 3.1)

Scientific classification
- Kingdom: Animalia
- Phylum: Chordata
- Class: Reptilia
- Order: Squamata
- Suborder: Serpentes
- Family: Colubridae
- Genus: Macroprotodon
- Species: M. abubakeri

Binomial name
- Macroprotodon abubakeri Wade, 2001

Species of snake

Macroprotodon abubakeri is a species of snake in the family Colubridae. It is one of four species in the genus Macroprotodon.

== Etymology ==
The specific name, abubakeri, is in honor of Algerian naturalist Aboubakeur Sid-Ahmed.

== Geographic range ==
M. abubakeri is found in Algeria, Morocco, and possibly the Spanish North African territories.

== Habitat ==
The natural habitat of M. abubakeri is Mediterranean-type shrubby vegetation.

== Conservation status ==
M. abubakeri is threatened by habitat loss.
