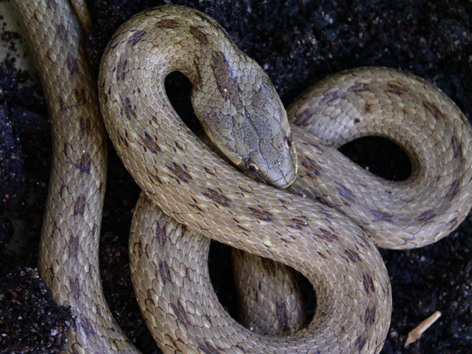

Scientific classification
- Domain: Eukaryota
- Kingdom: Animalia
- Phylum: Chordata
- Class: Reptilia
- Order: Squamata
- Suborder: Serpentes
- Family: Colubridae
- Genus: Macroprotodon
- Species: M. mauritanicus

Binomial name
- Macroprotodon mauritanicus Guichenot, 1850

= Macroprotodon mauritanicus =

Species of lizard

Macroprotodon mauritanicus is a species of snake found in Algeria and Tunisia.
