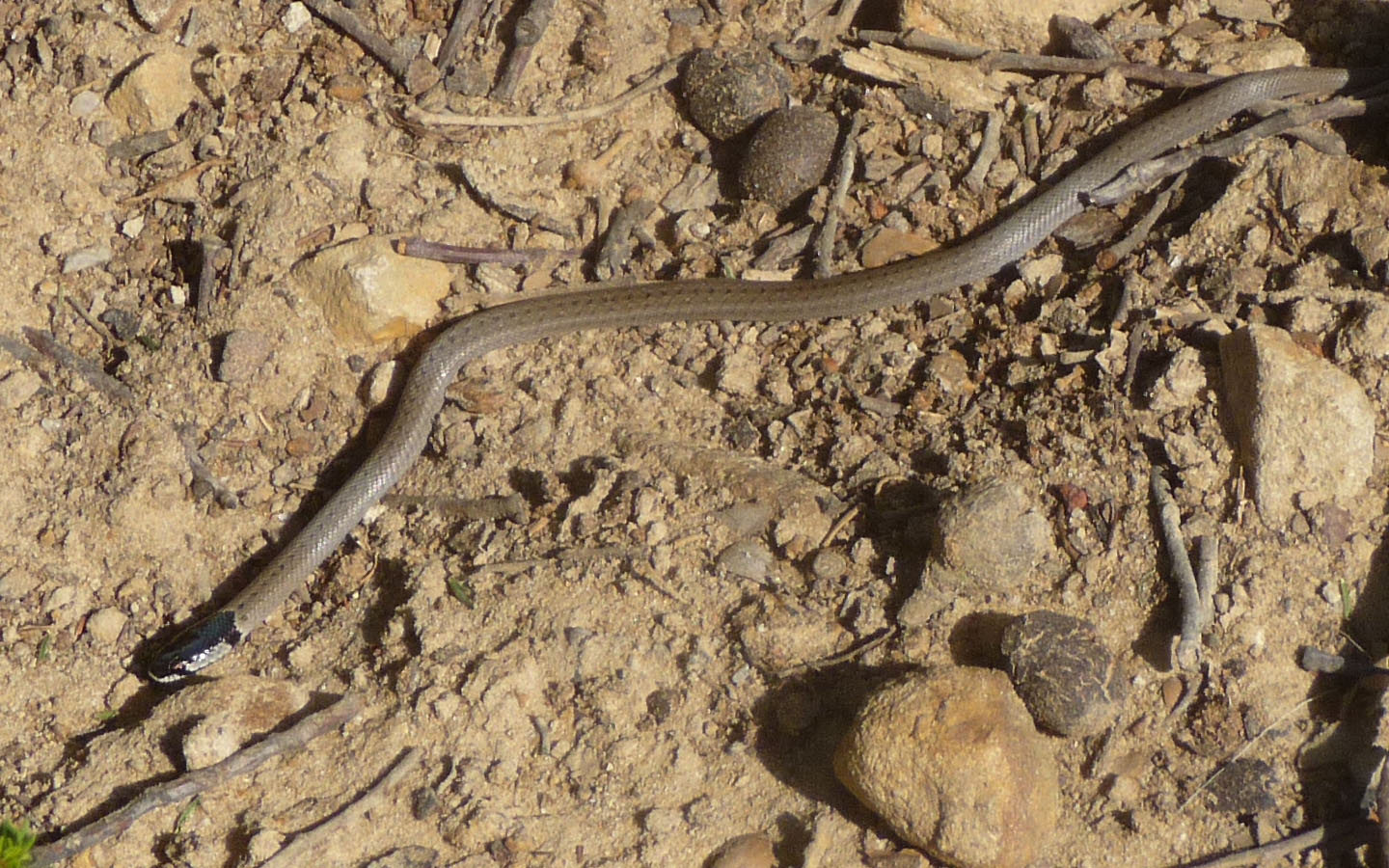
- Hooded Snake(Macroprotodon cucullatus).

Conservation status
- Least Concern (IUCN 3.1)

Scientific classification
- Kingdom: Animalia
- Phylum: Chordata
- Class: Reptilia
- Order: Squamata
- Suborder: Serpentes
- Family: Colubridae
- Genus: Macroprotodon
- Species: M. cucullatus

Binomial name
- Macroprotodon cucullatus (I. Geoffroy Saint-Hilaire, 1827)

Synonyms
- Coluber cucullatus I. Geoffroy Saint-Hilaire, 1827; Lycognathus cucullatus — A.M.C. Duméril, Bibron & A.H.A. Duméril, 1854; Coronella cucullata — Günther, 1858; Macroprotodon cucullatus — Boulenger, 1891

= Macroprotodon cucullatus =

Species of mildly venomous colubrid snake

Macroprotodon cucullatus, commonly known as the false smooth snake, is a species of mildly venomous colubrid snake endemic to the Mediterranean Basin.

== Geographic distribution ==
M. cucullatus is found in Algeria, Egypt, Israel, Italy, Libya, Morocco, Palestinian Territories, Portugal, Spain, and Tunisia.

== Description ==
Macroprotodon cucullatus is a small snake, usually not exceeding 55 cm (21 3/4 in) in total length (including tail). As the common name implies, the dorsal scales are smooth, and are arranged in 19-23 rows. Dorsally it is tan or gray, with small brown spots, or with darker and lighter streaks. Ventrally it is yellow to coral-red, uniform or spotted with black, the spots sometimes confluent at the midline. It has a blackish collar which may extend to the top of the head. There is usually a dark streak from the nostril to the corner of the mouth, passing under or through the eye. The eye is rather small, and the pupil, when seen contracted in bright light, is oval. The snout is flattened, and the rostral is wide and low, barely visible from above. The 6th upper labial extends upward and contacts the parietal. There is usually one anterior temporal.

== Habitat ==
The natural habitats of M. cucullatus are temperate forests, temperate shrubland, subtropical or tropical dry shrubland, Mediterranean-type shrubby vegetation, freshwater spring, rocky areas, sandy shores, arable land, pastureland, plantations, rural gardens, and urban areas.

== Behaviour ==
The false smooth snake is nocturnal in some parts of its range but mainly diurnal in the Balearic Islands.

== Diet ==
M. cucullatus preys upon small lizards such as geckos and lizards of the genus Lacerta. Small mammals and nestling birds are also eaten.

== Reproduction ==
Females of M. cucullatus may breed in alternate years. Two to six eggs are laid in a damp spot under a stone, buried in the soil or hidden in dense vegetation. They hatch in about eight weeks into juveniles with a snout-to-vent length of 12 to 16 cm (4.7 to 6.3 in).

== Venom ==
M. cucullatus possesses a mild venom, which is delivered by means of enlarged grooved teeth in the upper jaw. Although the venom is effective on lizards, this snake is not harmful to humans due to its small size.

== Conservation status ==
The IUCN has listed the false smooth snake as being of "Least Concern". This is because it has a wide distribution and a large population, seems to be tolerant of some habitat modification and its population is unlikely to be declining fast enough to qualify it for listing in a more threatened category.

== See also ==
- List of reptiles of Italy
