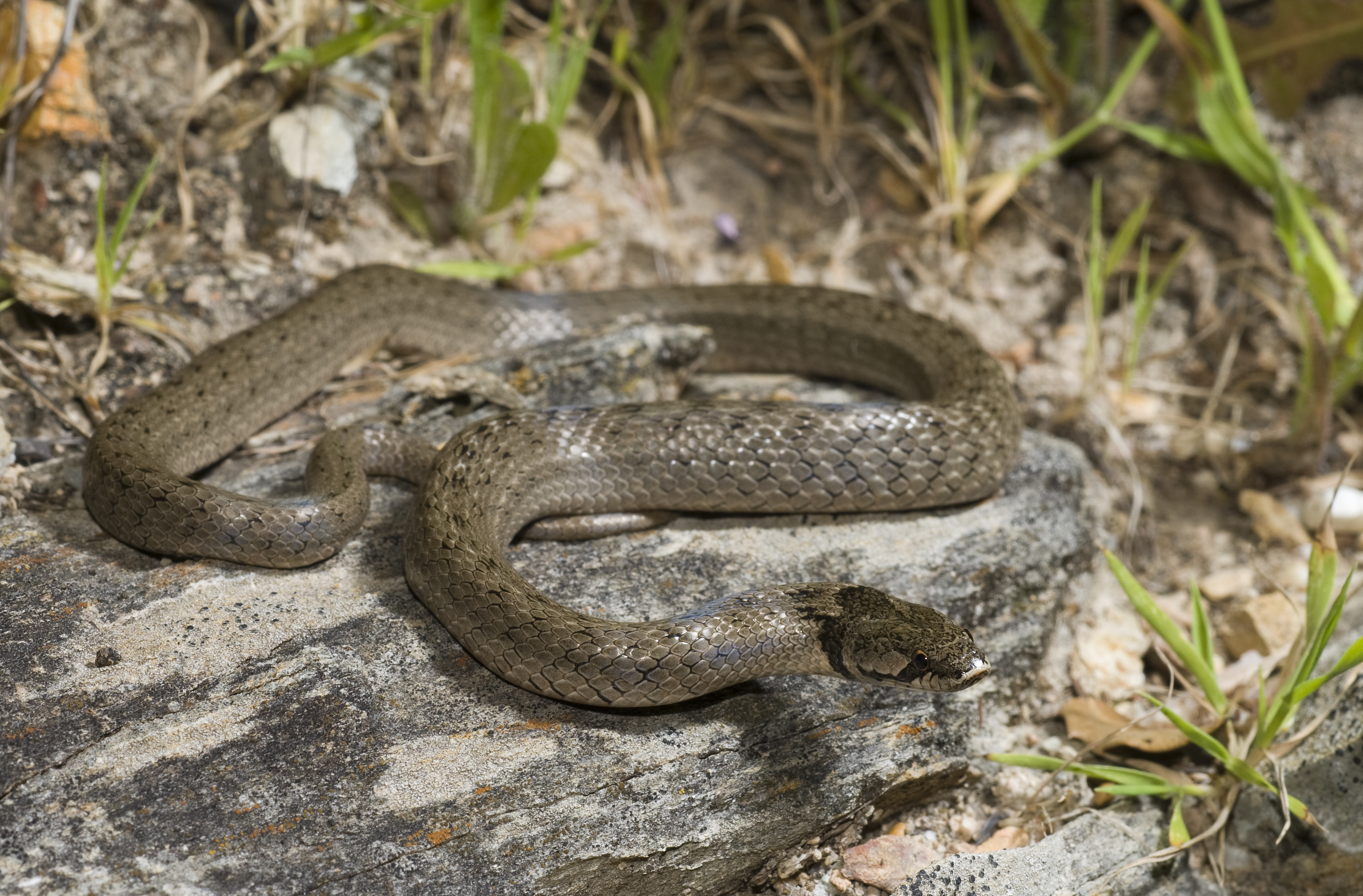
- Macroprotodon brevis

Scientific classification
- Kingdom: Animalia
- Phylum: Chordata
- Class: Reptilia
- Order: Squamata
- Suborder: Serpentes
- Family: Colubridae
- Subfamily: Colubrinae
- Genus: Macroprotodon; Guichenot, 1850

= Macroprotodon =

Genus of snakes

Macroprotodon is a genus of snakes in the family Colubridae. All of the member species of the genus are commonly known as false smooth snakes.

== Taxonomy ==
The genus Macroprotodon was originally described by French zoologist Alphonse Guichenot in 1850. The genus is in the subfamily Colubrinae of the family Colubridae.

== Species ==
Macroprotodon contains four species.

- M. abubakeri Wade, 2001
- M. brevis (Günther, 1862) – western false smooth snake
- M. cucullatus (I. Geoffroy Saint-Hilaire, 1827) – false smooth snake
- M. mauritanicus Guichenot, 1850

Some authorities have considered some of these species to be subspecies of the other species.

Nota bene: A binomial authority in parentheses indicates that the species was originally described in a genus other than Macroprotodon.
