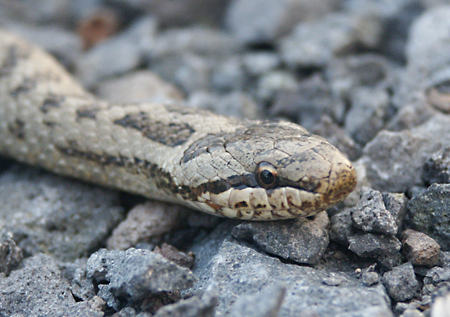

Conservation status
- Least Concern (IUCN 3.1)

Scientific classification
- Kingdom: Animalia
- Phylum: Chordata
- Class: Reptilia
- Order: Squamata
- Suborder: Serpentes
- Family: Colubridae
- Genus: Coronella
- Species: C. austriaca

Binomial name
- Coronella austriaca Laurenti, 1768
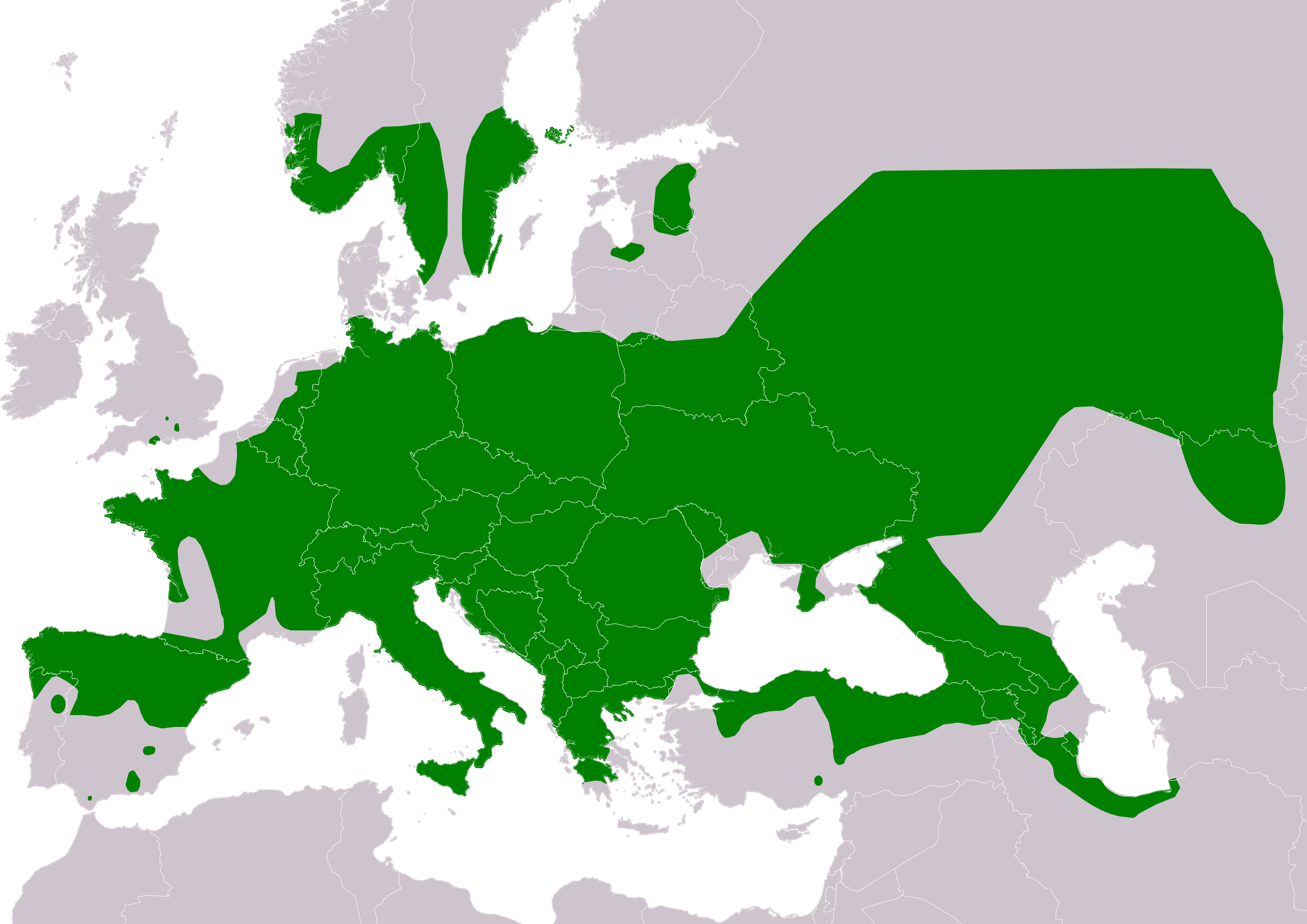
- Range of C. austriaca

= Smooth snake =

Species of non-venomous snake

The smooth snake (Coronella austriaca) is a species of small snakes in the family Colubridae. The species is found in northern and central Europe, but also as far east as northern Iran. The Reptile Database recognizes two subspecies as being valid, including the nominotypical subspecies described here.

== Subspecies ==
There are two subspecies:

Subspecies	Distribution
C. a. austriaca Laurenti, 1768	
C. a. acutirostris Malkmus, 1995	Portugal

== Geographic range ==
Coronella austriaca is found from the south of England through France and the Low Countries to northern Spain and Portugal, Germany, Norway and Sweden (as far north as latitude 63°), Latvia, Lithuania, Estonia, Switzerland, Austria, Italy and Sicily (but not in Corsica or Sardinia), the western Balkans and Greece, and European Russia as far north as latitude 57°. In Asia, it is found from Turkey to Azerbaijan, Georgia, Armenia and northern Iran. It is absent in Denmark despite the species being found just south of the German border as well as in southern Sweden. The species is only known from Denmark from 6 specimens, all found between 1870 and 1914.

In Finland, the species is found only in Åland, and it is not common there.

== Description ==
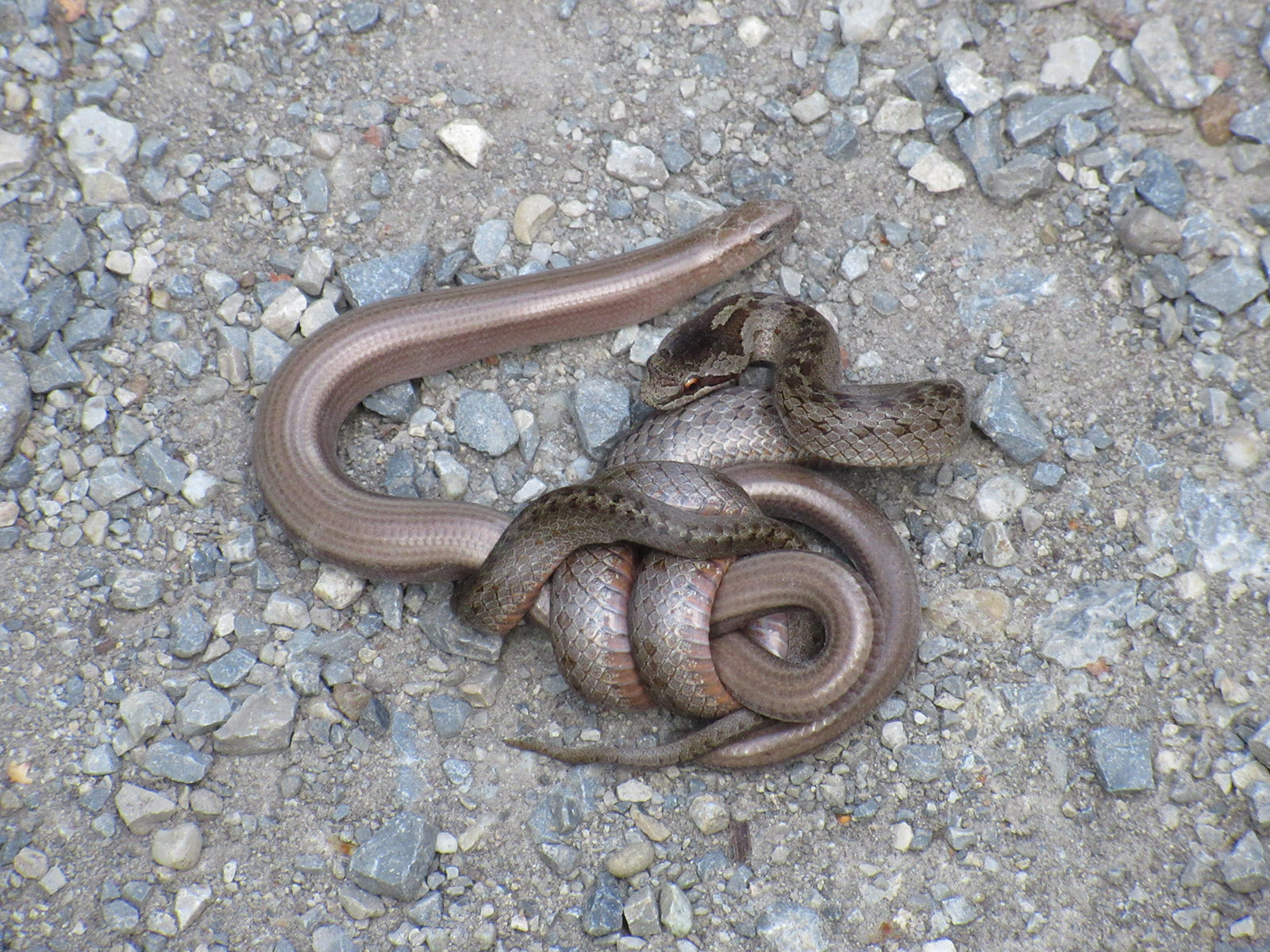
Feeding on a common slow worm

Both sexes of C. austriaca grow to an average total length (including tail) of about 60 cm (24 in) to 75 cm (30 in). Two specimens measuring 83 cm (33 in) have been recorded in Sweden, as well as one in Russia that was 92 cm (36 in).

The head has a rostral scale that is at least as deep as it is wide, creating a triangular indentation between the internasal scales (rarely separating them). The top of the head is covered with nine large plates. The nasal scale is often divided. There is one (rarely two) preoculars and two postoculars. The temporals number 2+2 or 2+3 (rarely 1+2). There are seven (rarely eight) upper labials, of which the third and fourth or fourth and fifth border the eye.

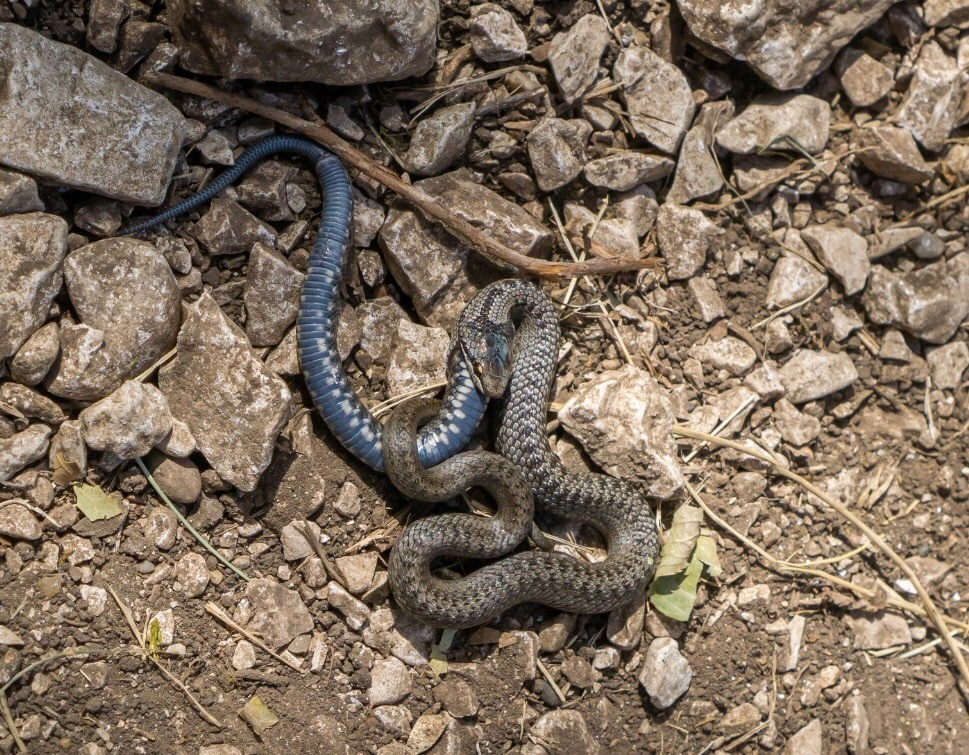
Eating a grass snake

In the middle part of the body there are 19 (rarely 17 or 21) rows of dorsal scales. In contrast with many other snakes found in the region, these scales are flat (not keeled). This gives the snake a smooth texture to the touch, from which it gets its common name. The ventral scales number 150–164 in males and 162–200 in females. The anal scale is divided (rarely single) and the subcaudal scales are paired. Males have 54–70 subcaudal scales and females 40–76.

The colour pattern consists of a brown, grey or reddish ground colour with two rows of small, rather indistinct dark spots running down the back towards the tail. In some cases, each pair of spots may be united toward the neck area, forming a series of cross-bars over the back. There is also a very indistinct series of dark spots running along each of the flanks. These four series of spots along the body overlay four parallel, rather shadowy stripes that also run down the back and flanks.

On the top of the head is a dark marking which is often in the shape of a crown, giving rise to the generic name Coronella (which means coronet). A relatively thick dark stripe extends from each nostril, through the eye, and along the side of the head to a little beyond the neck. The upper labials are whitish, greyish-white or light brown, sometimes with darker spots. The tongue is reddish brown or dark red.

== Biology ==
The smooth snake feeds on smaller animals, especially other reptiles. It subdues larger prey by constriction, although unlike true constrictors it does not kill by this method. C. austriaca is an opisthoglyphous species, the total subjugation of its prey occurs through the inoculation of secretions produced by the venom gland, which are able to neutralize small animals. Smooth snakes are ovoviviparous: the juveniles hatch out of eggs internally and are born live.

In Britain it is restricted to heathland habitats.

== See also ==
- List of reptiles of Europe

== Gallery ==
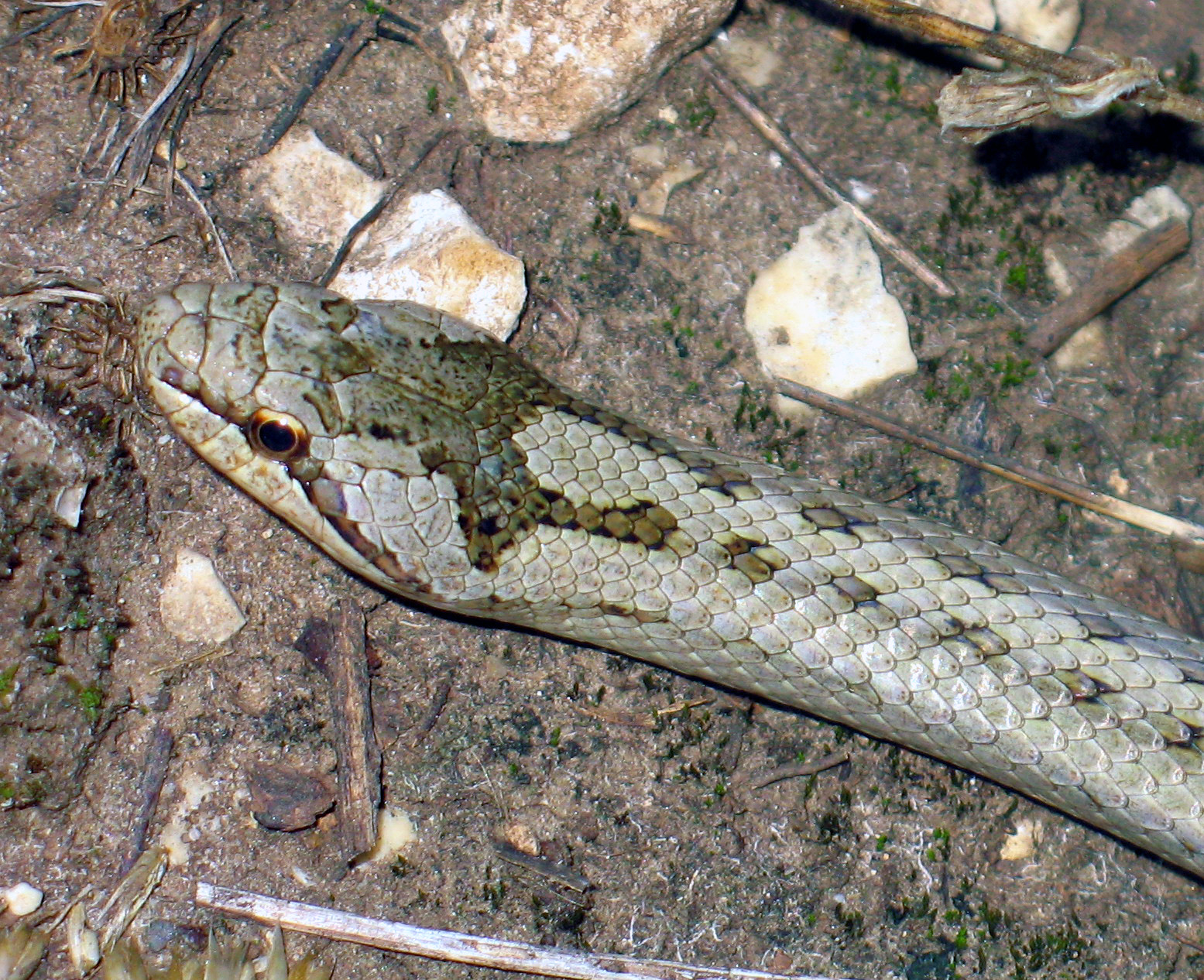
Head of C. austriaca.

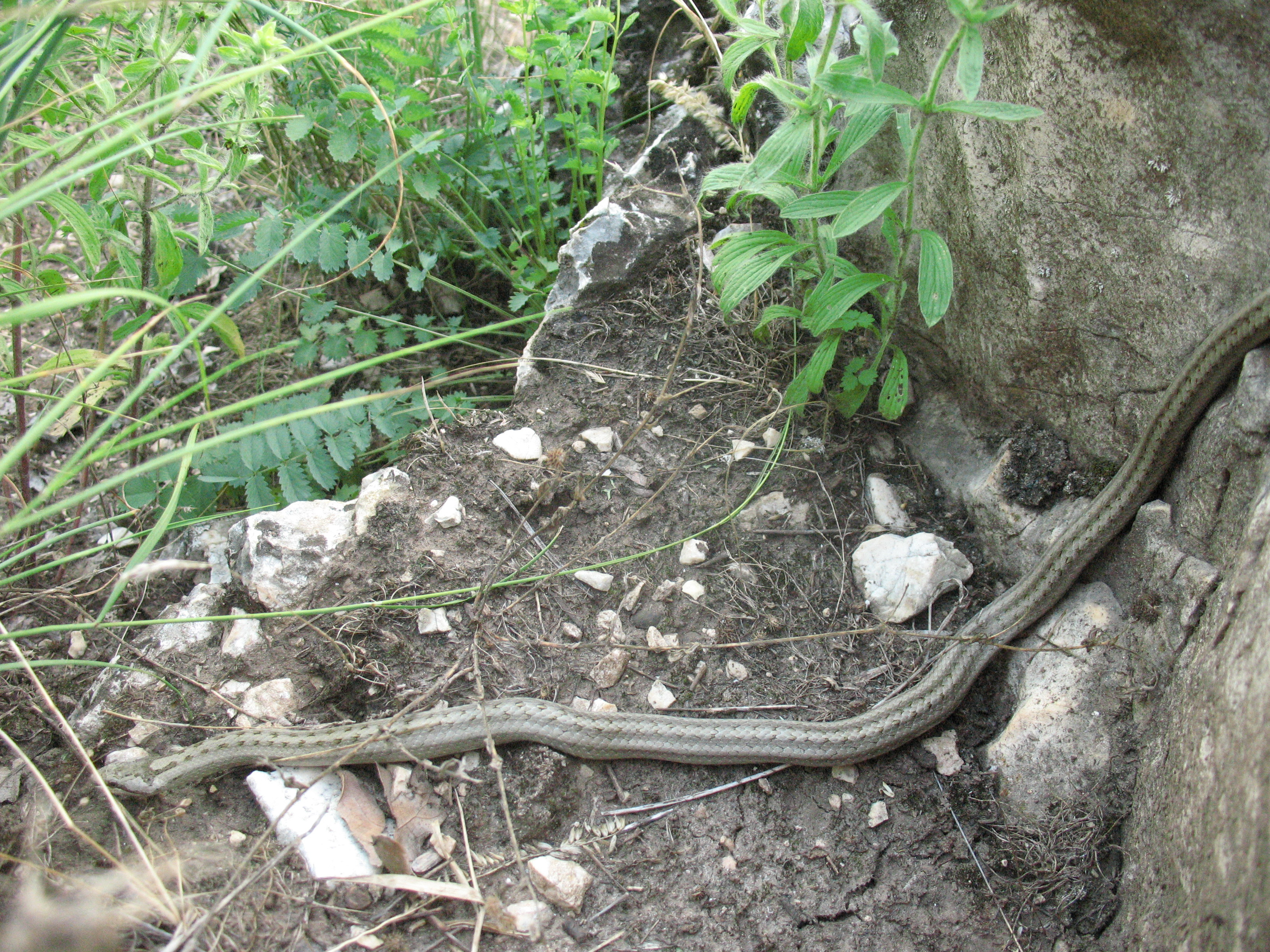
C. austriaca in Hungary.

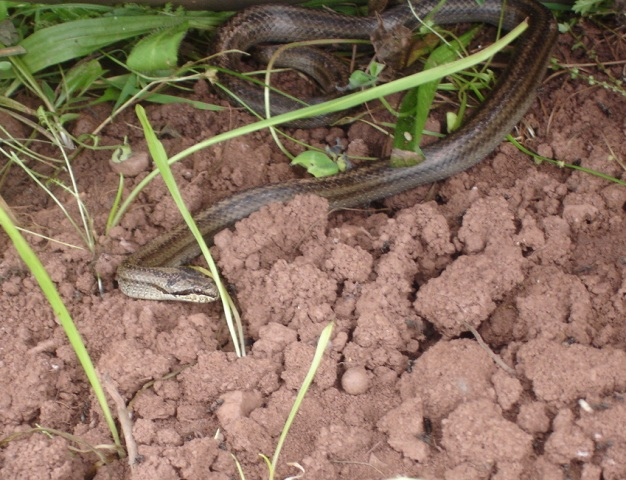
C. austriaca in Bosnia and Herzegovina.

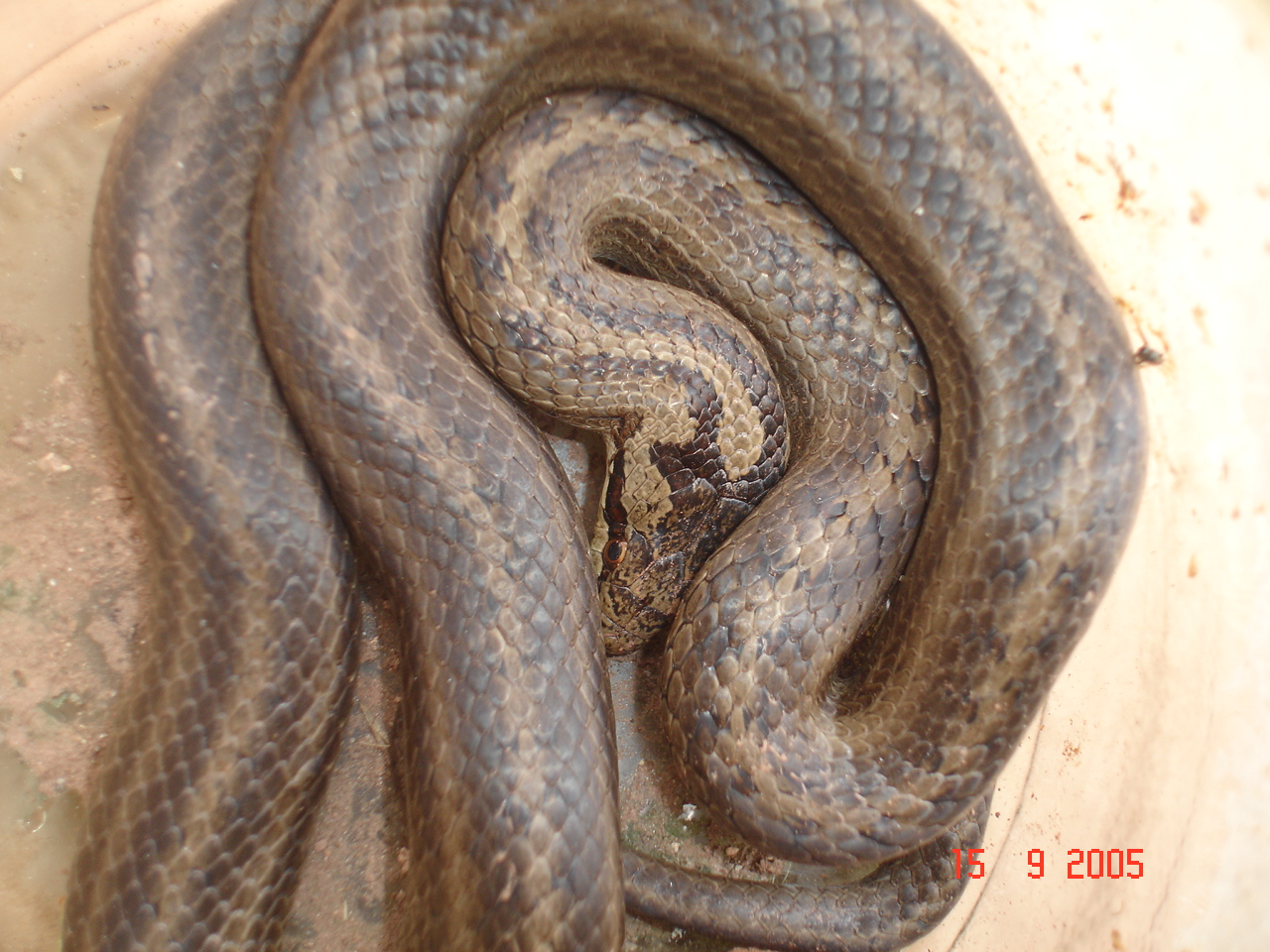
C. austriaca curled up.

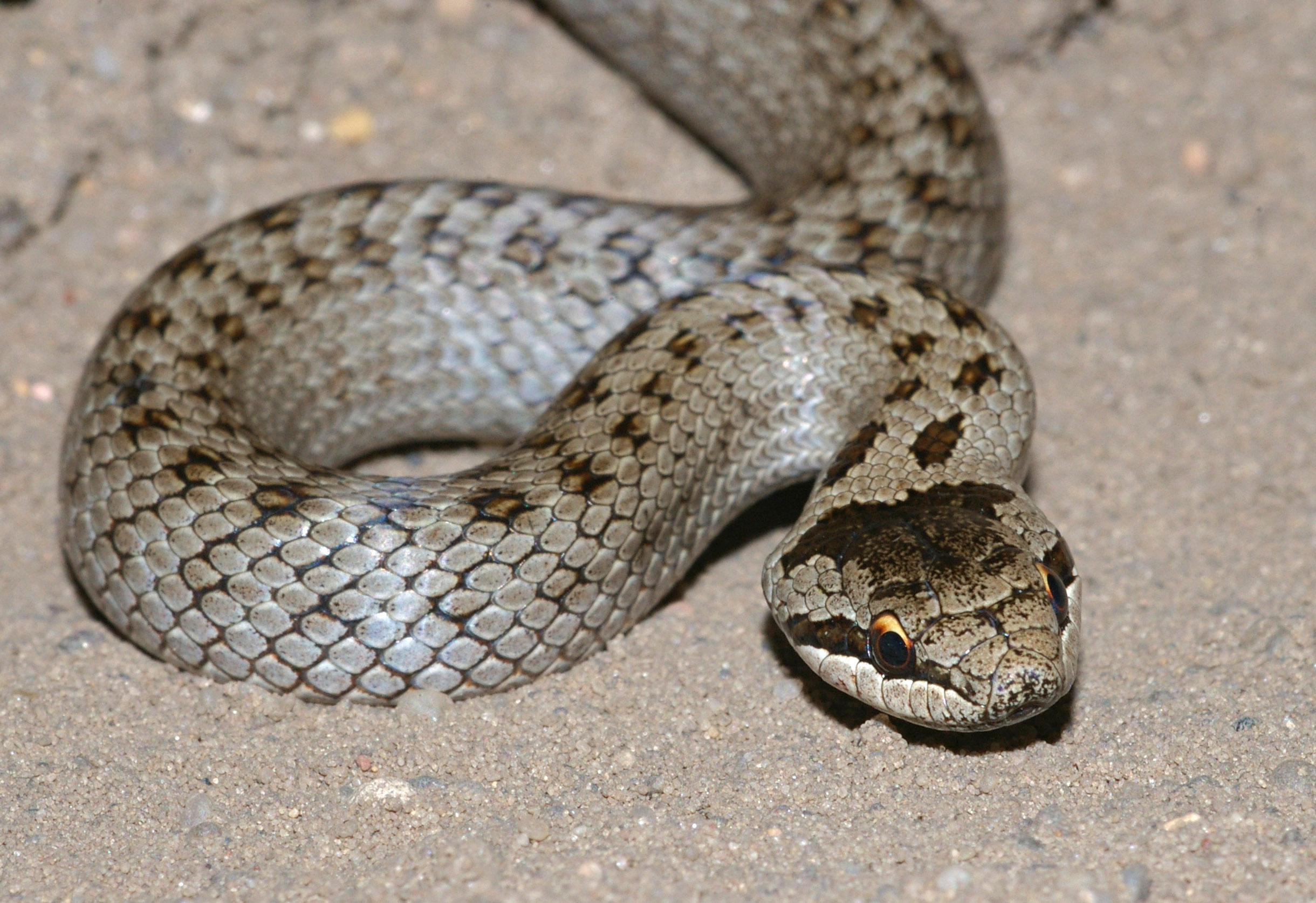
Subadult C. austriaca in northern Germany.

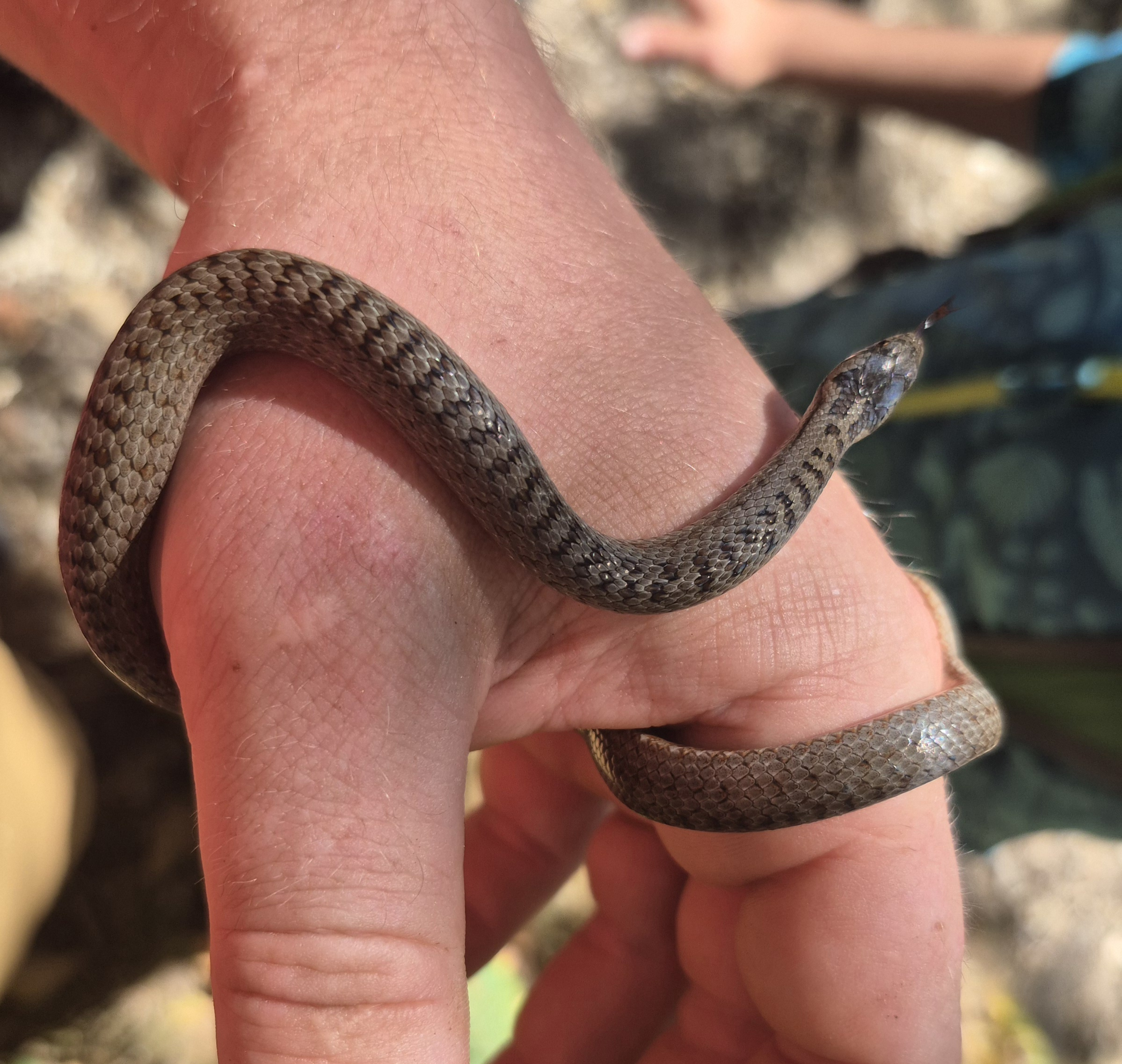
C. austriaca - Dorset, UK (August 2025)
