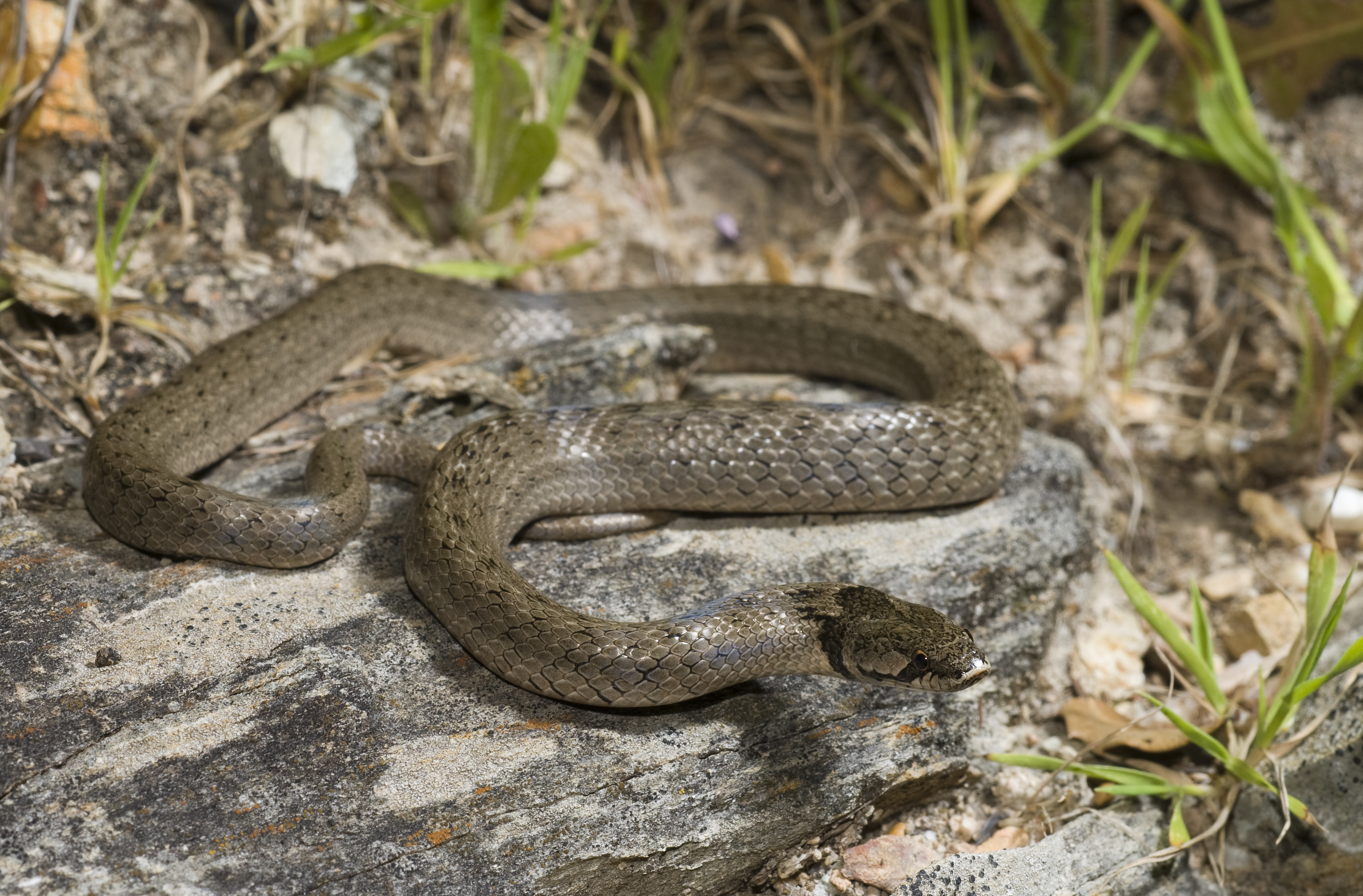

Conservation status
- Near Threatened (IUCN 3.1)

Scientific classification
- Kingdom: Animalia
- Phylum: Chordata
- Class: Reptilia
- Order: Squamata
- Suborder: Serpentes
- Family: Colubridae
- Genus: Macroprotodon
- Species: M. brevis

Binomial name
- Macroprotodon brevis (Günther, 1862)
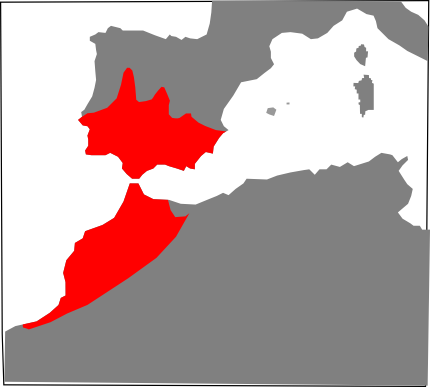
- Distribution

Synonyms
- Coronella brevis Günther, 1862; Macroprotodon maroccanus W. Peters, 1882; Macroprotodon cucullatus brevis — Bauer et al., 1995; Macroprotodon brevis — Carranza et al., 2004

= Western false smooth snake =

Species of snake

The western false smooth snake or Iberian false smooth snake (Macroprotodon brevis) is a species of snake in the family Colubridae.

== Feeding habits ==
The species feeds exclusively on vertebrates, mainly reptiles, and mostly long-bodied prey which are burrowers or live under rocks.

Some aspects of its morphology and feeding habits suggest that it is not nocturnal, but rather lives under rocks.

== Geographic range ==
M. brevis is found on the Iberian Peninsula and Morocco.

== Habitat ==
The natural habitats of M. brevis include evergreen temperate forests and Mediterranean-style scrubland.

== Conservation status ==
M. brevis is threatened by habitat loss, largely the result of agriculture, and faces some threat from the wild boar.
