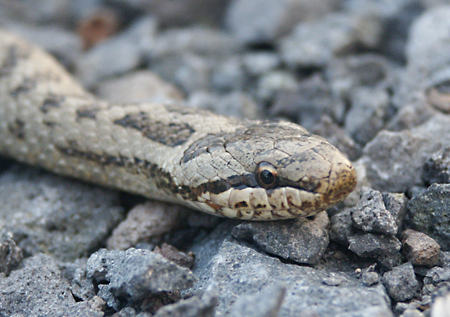
- Smooth snake, C. austriaca

Scientific classification
- Kingdom: Animalia
- Phylum: Chordata
- Class: Reptilia
- Order: Squamata
- Suborder: Serpentes
- Family: Colubridae
- Subfamily: Colubrinae
- Genus: Coronella; Laurenti, 1768

= Coronella =

Genus of snakes

Coronella is a genus of harmless snakes in the family Colubridae. The genus is endemic to Europe, North Africa and West Asia. Two species are currently recognized as being valid.

Common names: Smooth snakes.

== Description ==
Species in the genus Coronella are relatively small snakes, rarely growing to more than 60 cm (2.0 ft) in total length (including tail). The head is only slightly distinct from the neck, and the pupil is round. The teeth of the upper jaw increase in size towards the rear of the mouth. The body is almost cylindrical and covered with smooth scales. The subcaudals are paired.

== Behavior ==
Coronella species are terrestrial and rather secretive, spending much of their time under cover.

== Feeding ==
The diet of snakes of the genus Coronella is made up mainly of lizards and the young of other snakes, as well as small rodents, especially young rodents still in the nest. They have often been described as constrictors, although there is no good evidence for this. Street (1979) notes that prey is held firmly in its coils, but only for the purpose of restraint rather than to kill it.

== Geographic range ==
Species in the genus Coronella are found in Europe, North Africa and West Asia.

== Species ==
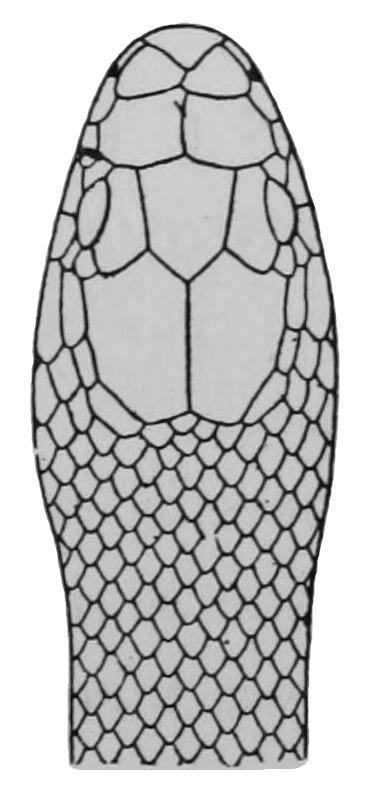
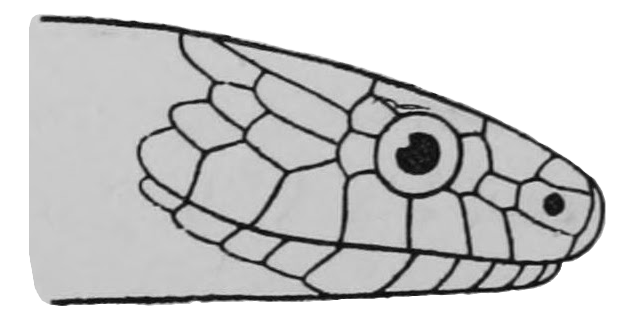
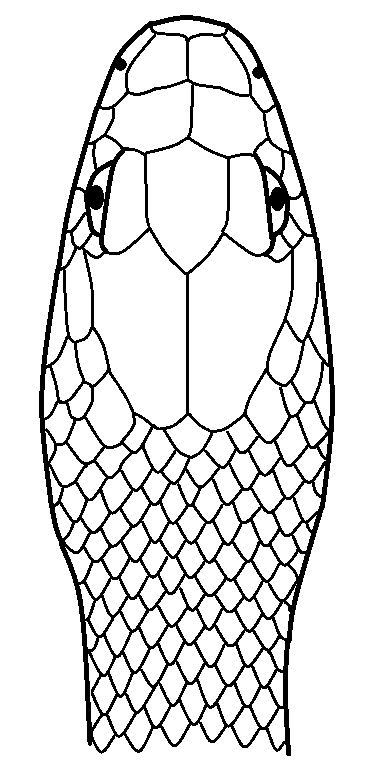
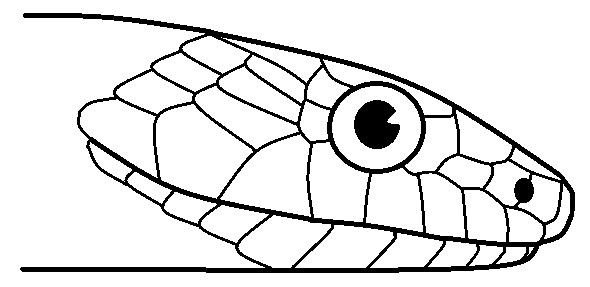
Species	Authority	Subsp.*	Common name	Head (dorsal)	Head (lateral)	Geographic range
C. austriaca	Laurenti, 1768	2	Smooth snake			Finland, southern Norway, Sweden, Belgium, Netherlands, Luxembourg, Germany, Austria, Switzerland, southern England, northern Spain, northern Portugal, France, Italy, Poland, Czech Republic, Slovakia, Hungary, Croatia, Slovenia, Bosnia and Herzegovina, Montenegro, North Macedonia, Serbia, Romania, Bulgaria, Greece (incl. Samothraki), Albania, Turkey, Russia, Latvia, Lithuania, Belarus, Ukraine, Moldova, Armenia, Georgia, Azerbaijan, western Kazakhstan, northern Asia Minor, northern Iran.
C. girondica	Daudin, 1803	1	Southern smooth snake			Spain, Portugal, southern France, Italy, Morocco, Algeria, Tunisia.

*) Not including the nominate subspecies (typical form).

== Taxonomy ==
The genus Coronella is closely related to the American kingsnakes of the genus Lampropeltis, and both genera were once classified within the same genus.
