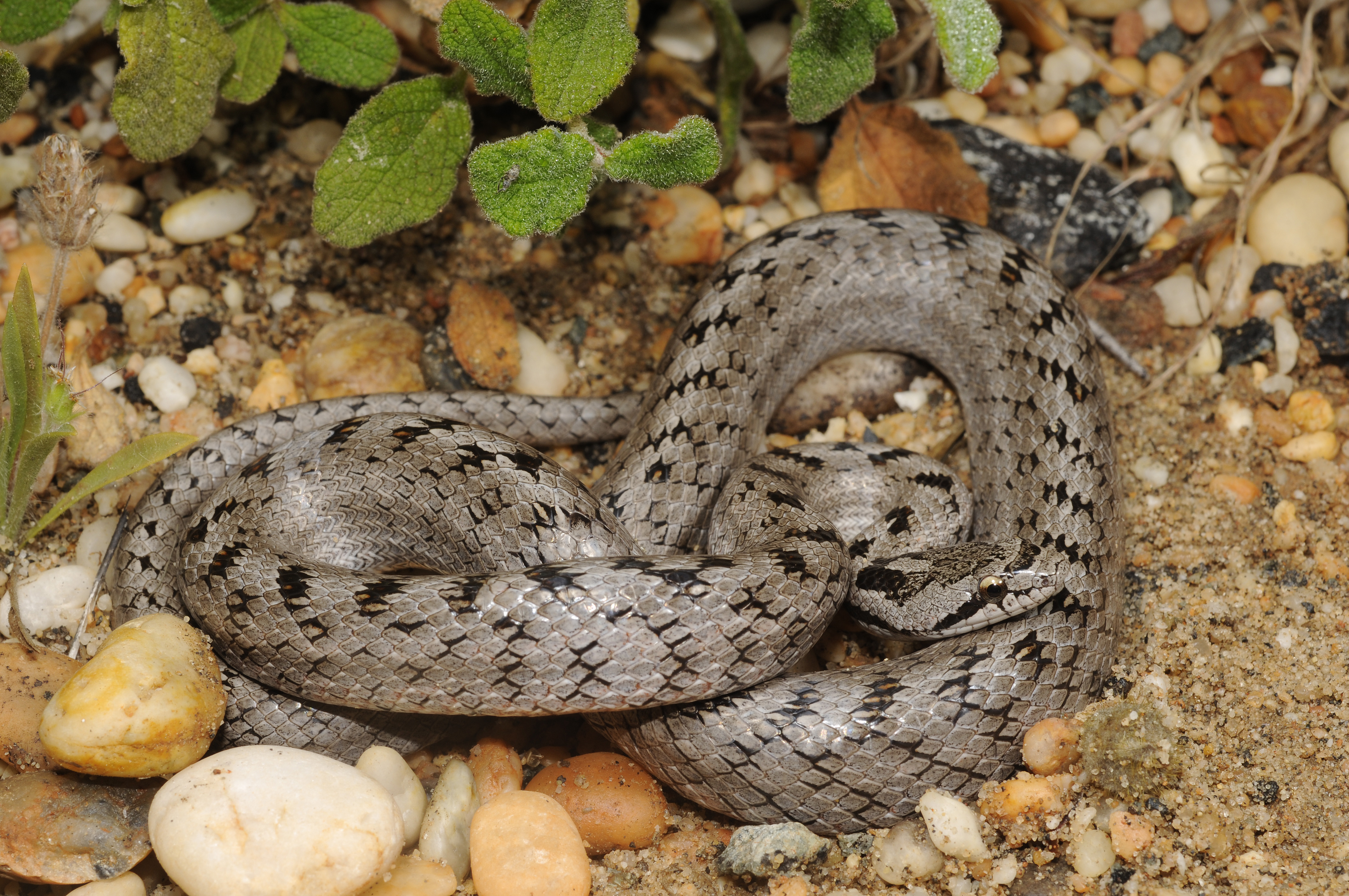

Conservation status
- Least Concern (IUCN 3.1)

Scientific classification
- Kingdom: Animalia
- Phylum: Chordata
- Class: Reptilia
- Order: Squamata
- Suborder: Serpentes
- Family: Colubridae
- Genus: Coronella
- Species: C. girondica

Binomial name
- Coronella girondica (Daudin, 1803)
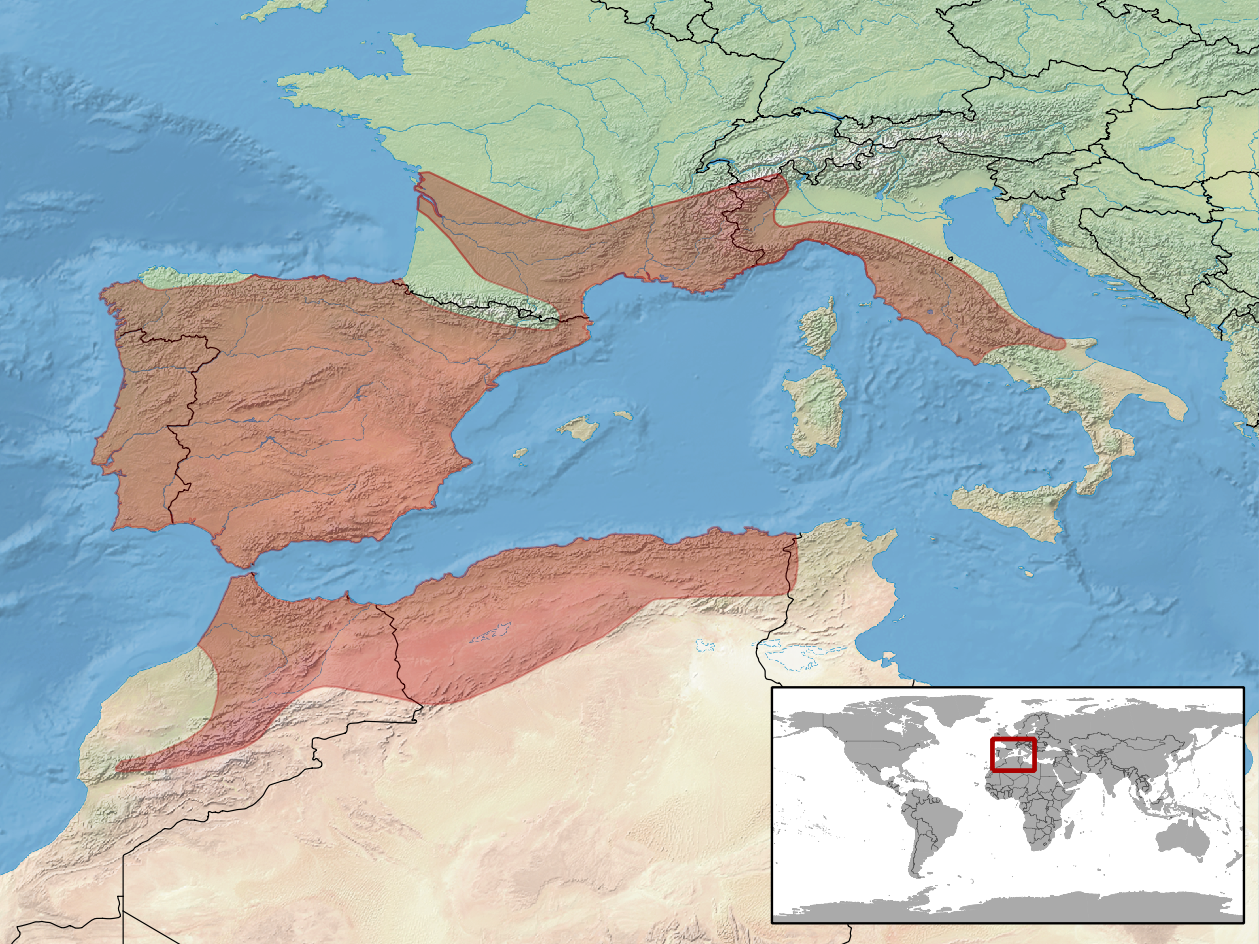

Synonyms
- Coluber girondicus Daudin, 1803; Coluber riccioli — Metaxa, 1823; Zamenis riccioli — Bonaparte, 1839; Coronella girundica [sic] A.M.C. Duméril & Bibron, 1854 (ex errore); Coronella riccioli — De Betta, 1857; Coronella girondica — Jan, 1866

= Coronella girondica =

Species of snake

Coronella girondica, commonly known as the southern smooth snake or Riccioli's snake, is a species of harmless snake in the family Colubridae. The species is endemic to southern Europe and northern Africa. No subspecies are recognized as being valid.

== Geographic range ==
C. girondica is found in Spain, Portugal, southern France, Monaco, Italy, Morocco, Algeria, and Tunisia. The type locality given is Bordeaux, France.

== Description ==
C. girondica is brown, grayish, or reddish dorsally, with dark brown or blackish transverse bars or spots. On the nape there is a dark U-shaped mark, or a pair of dark elongate spots. There is a dark streak from the eye to the corner of the mouth, a dark band from eye to eye across the prefrontals, and a black line below the eye. Ventrally it is yellowish or red with black markings. The dorsal scales, which are smooth, are in 21 rows (rarely 19). Adults may attain a total length of 62 cm (2 feet), of which 12.5 cm (5 inches) is tail.

== Habitat ==
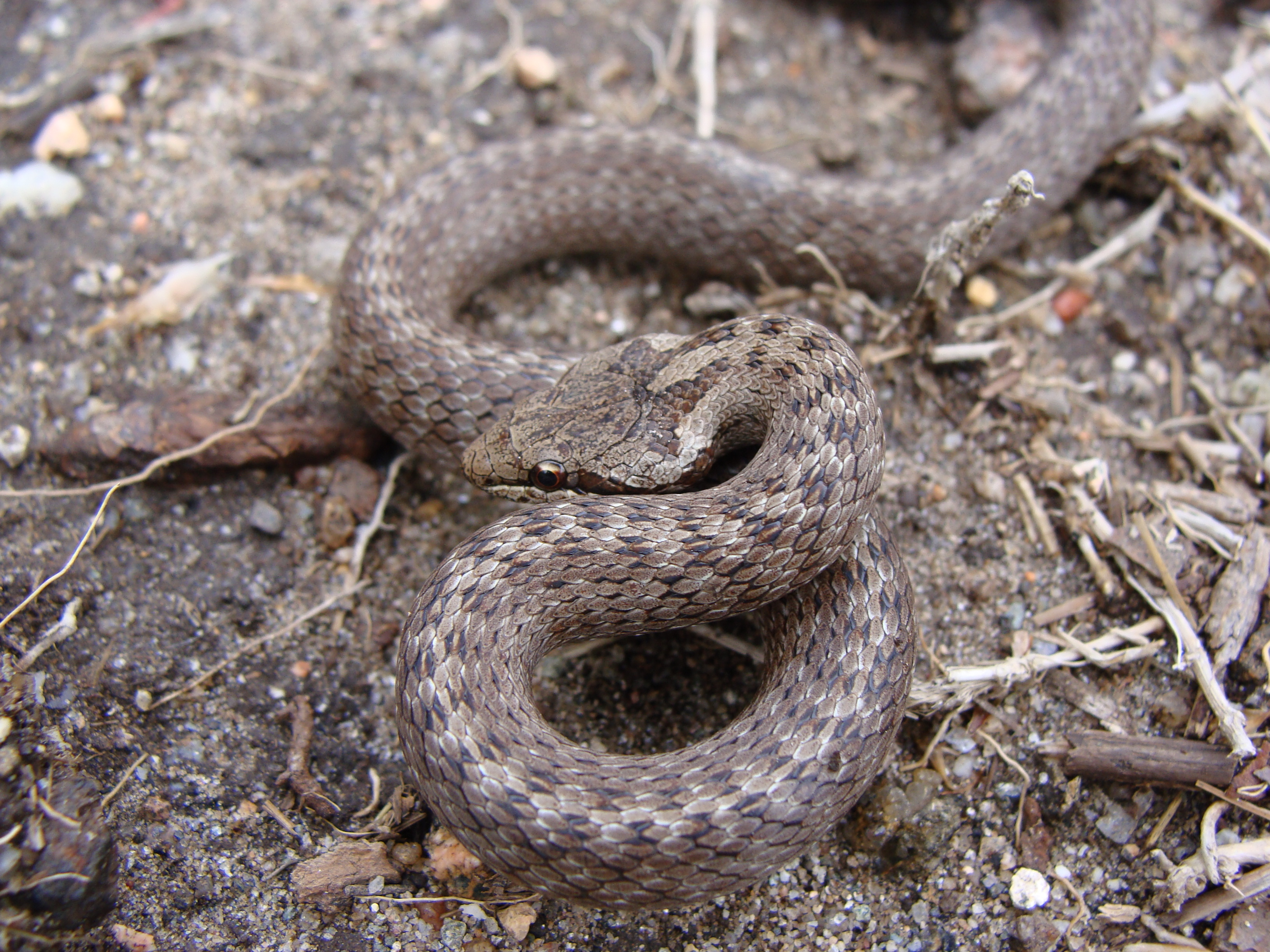
Coronella girondica in Peneda-Gerês National Park, Portugal

The natural habitats of C. girondica are temperate forests, Mediterranean-type shrubby vegetation, rocky areas, pastureland, and plantations.

It is threatened by habitat loss.

== Conservation status ==
This species, C. girondica, is classified as Least Concern (LC) on the IUCN Red List of Threatened Species (v3.1, 2001). Species are listed as such due to their wide distribution, presumed large population, or because it is unlikely to be declining fast enough to qualify for listing in a more threatened category. Year assessed: 2005.

== See also ==
- List of reptiles of Italy
