= Josephus Nicolaus Laurenti =

Austrian naturalist and zoologist

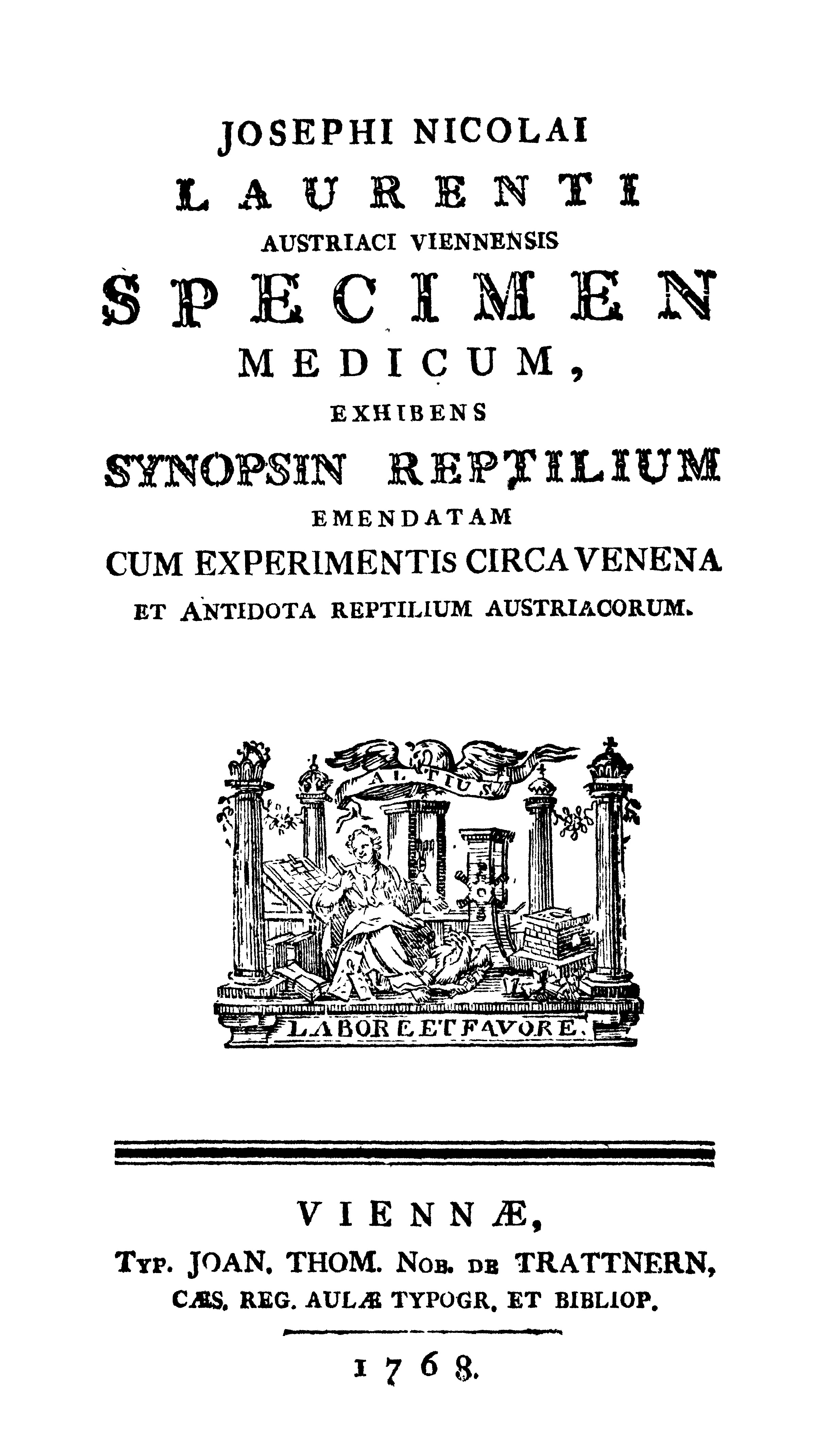
- Born: 4 December 1735; Vienna
- Died: 17 February 1805 (aged 69); Vienna
- Education: University of Vienna
- Scientific career
- Fields: Medicine, herpetology

Signature
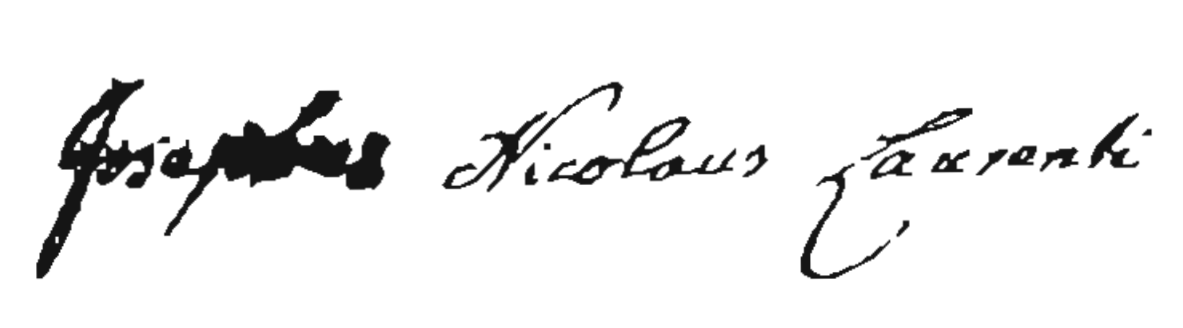

Josephus Nicolaus Laurenti (4 December 1735, Vienna – 17 February 1805, Vienna) was an Austrian naturalist and zoologist of Italian origin.

Laurenti is considered the auctor of the class Reptilia (reptiles) through his authorship of Specimen Medicum, Exhibens Synopsin Reptilium Emendatam cum Experimentis circa Venena (1768) on the poisonous function of reptiles and amphibians. This was an important book in herpetology, defining thirty genera of reptiles; Carl Linnaeus's 10th edition of Systema Naturae in 1758 defined only ten genera. Specimen Medicum contains a description of the blind salamander (amphibian): Proteus anguinus, purportedly collected from cave waters in Slovenia (or possibly western Croatia); this description represented one of the first published accounts of a cave animal in the western world, although Proteus anguinus was not recognized as a cave animal at the time.

In the past, Laurenti's authorship of his work has been doubted several times and attributed to the Hungarian scientist Jacob Joseph Winterl, but without substantive evidence.
