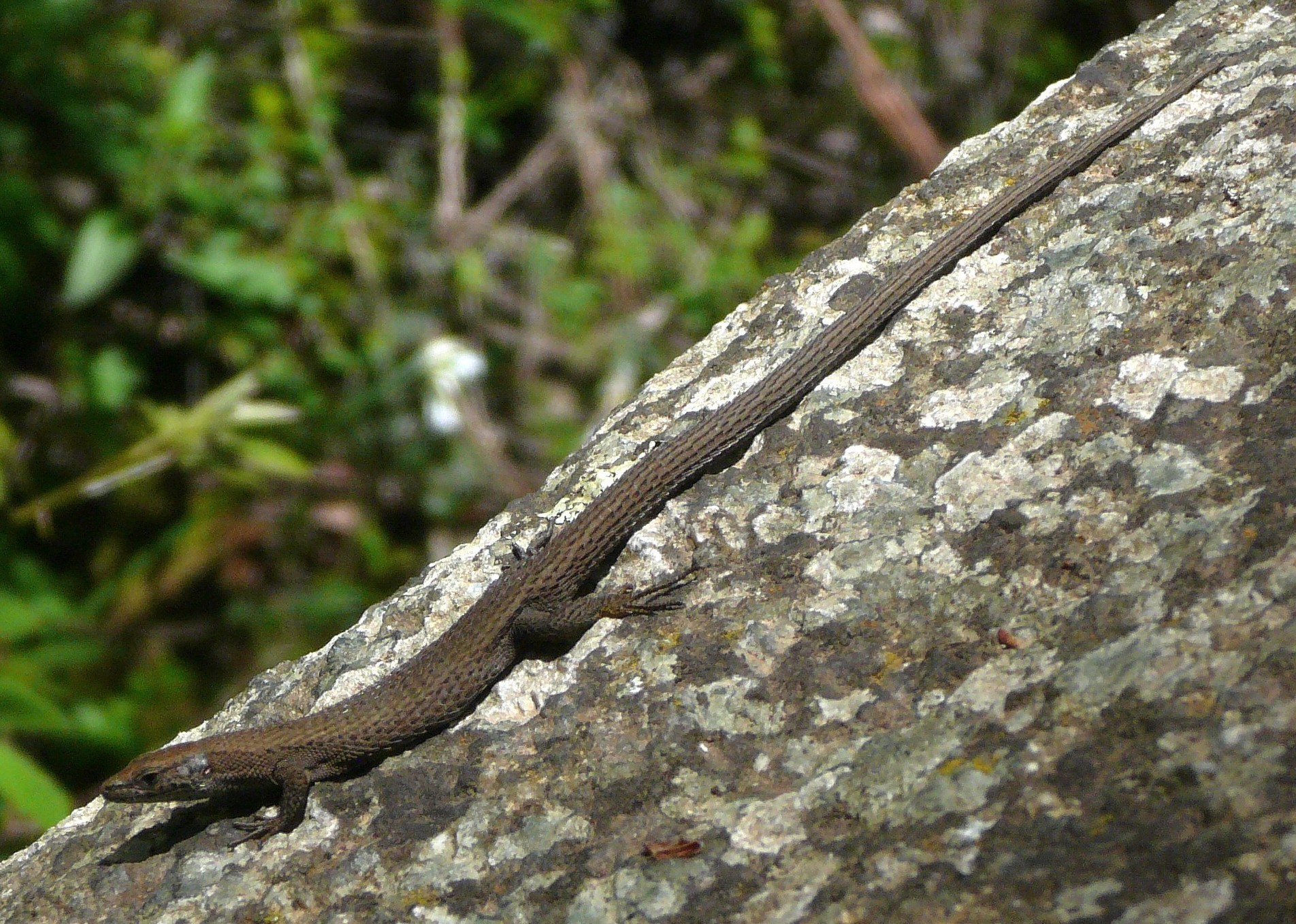

Conservation status
- Least Concern (IUCN 3.1)

Scientific classification
- Kingdom: Animalia
- Phylum: Chordata
- Class: Reptilia
- Order: Squamata
- Family: Lacertidae
- Genus: Algyroides
- Species: A. fitzingeri

Binomial name
- Algyroides fitzingeri (Wiegmann, 1834)

Synonyms
- Notopholis fitzingeri Wiegmann, 1834; Lacerta fitzingeri — A.M.C. Duméril & Bibron, 1839; Algiroides fitzingeri — Bedriaga, 1866; Algyroides fitzingeri — Engelmann et al., 1993

= Fitzinger's algyroides =

Species of lizard

Fitzinger's algyroides (Algyroides fitzingeri), also commonly called the pygmy algyroides and the pygmy keeled lizard, is a species of lizard in the family Lacertidae. The species is native to the islands of Corsica and Sardinia in the Mediterranean. There are no subspecies.

== Taxonomy ==
Fitzinger;s algyroides was first formally described as Notolophis fitzingeri in 1834 by the German herpetologist Arend Friedrich August Wiegmann with its type locality given as Sardinia. This species is classified in the genus Algyroides which belongs to the family Lacertidae, the African and Eurasian "typical lizards".

== Etymology ==
The specific name, fitzingeri, is in honor of Austrian herpetologist Leopold Fitzinger.

== Description ==
Fitzinger's algyroides is up to 130mm in length and is the smallest and most slender member of the genus Algyroides. It can be tod apart from the Greek algyroides, which laso has the scales on the back all being similar, by the sharp demarcation between thescales on the sides and the underside and by the absence of pale lines above the eye. Its hind legs are short in comparison to the Greek Algyroides too. It can be distinguished from the two other Algyroides species, the Spanish algyroides and the blue-throated keeled lizard, by the unreduced scales on its flanks. The head is flattened, with a redulced layer of osteoderms and the supraciliary laminae are only partly ossified, there are no teeth on the pterygoid. This species is the only species of algyroides known to have a hemipenis with epithelium on the crown, the hemipenis of the others have simple extended tips.

== Geographic range ==
A. fitzingeri is found only in Corsica and Sardinia.

== Habitat ==
The natural habitats of A. fitzingeri are temperate forests, temperate shrubland, Mediterranean-type shrubby vegetation, temperate grassland, rocky areas, arable land, pastureland, and rural gardens, at altitudes from sea level to 1,800 m (5,900 ft).

== Reproduction ==
A. fitzingeri is oviparous. Clutch size is 2–4 eggs.

== See also ==
- List of reptiles of Italy
