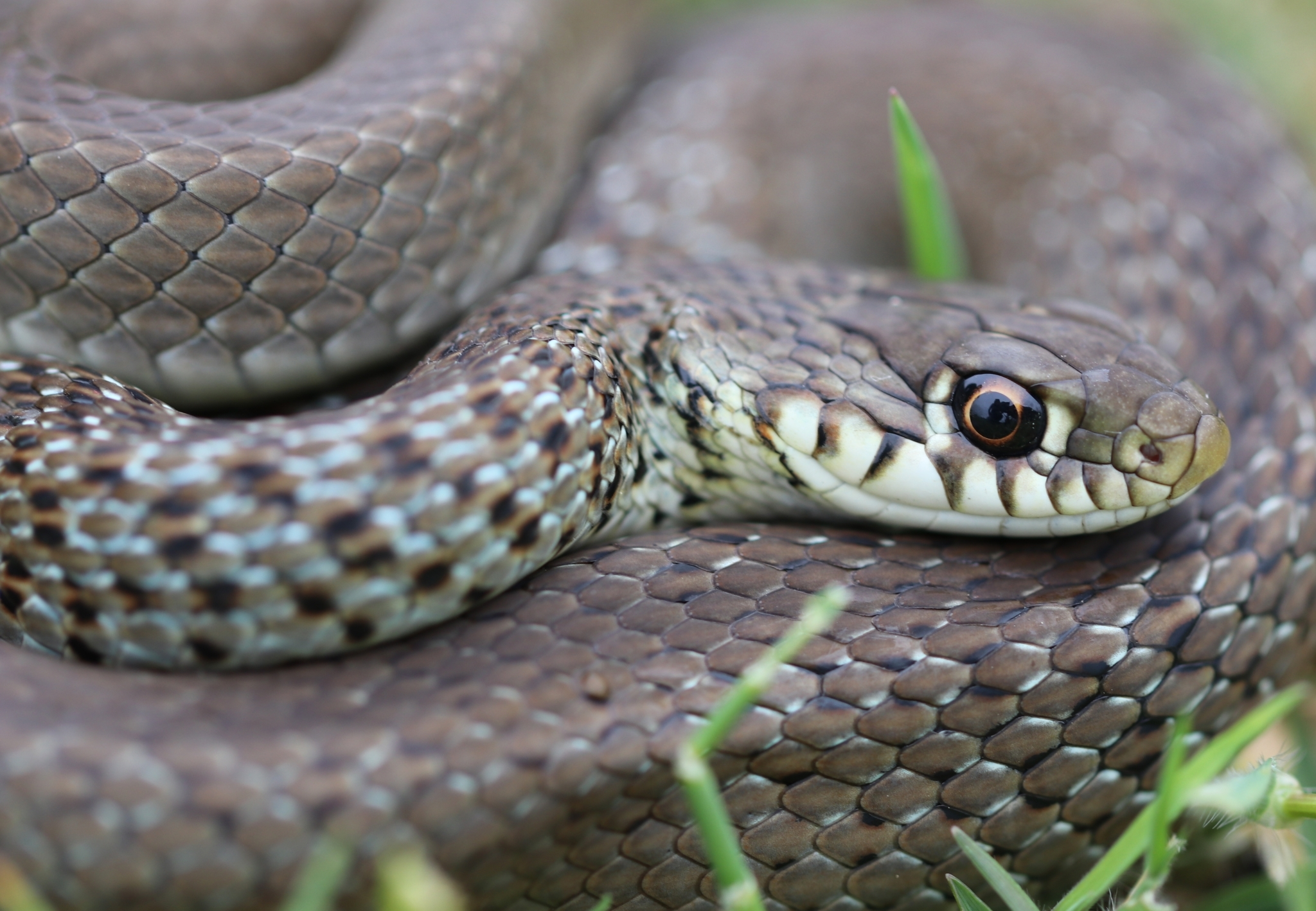

Conservation status
- Least Concern (IUCN 3.1)

Scientific classification
- Kingdom: Animalia
- Phylum: Chordata
- Class: Reptilia
- Order: Squamata
- Suborder: Serpentes
- Family: Colubridae
- Genus: Hierophis
- Species: H. gemonensis

Binomial name
- Hierophis gemonensis (Laurenti, 1768)

Synonyms
- Coluber gemonensis Laurenti, 1768

= Balkan whip snake =

Species of snake

The Balkan whip snake (Hierophis gemonensis, formerly known as Coluber gemonensis) is a species of snake in the family Colubridae. It is found in Italy, Greece (including the Greek islands) and most of the Balkan countries (specifically in Albania, Bosnia and Herzegovina, Croatia, North Macedonia, Serbia and Slovenia) where its natural habitats are Mediterranean-type shrubby vegetation, pastureland, plantations and rural gardens. It is threatened by habitat loss in parts of its range but overall is assessed by the IUCN as being of "least concern".

== Description ==
The Balkan whip snake is a slender snake with smooth scales usually under a metre (yard) long but exceptionally reaching 130 cm (50 ins). The head is fairly distinct from the body and has prominent eyes with round pupils. The head and front of the body are olive-grey or yellowish-brown with dark spots separated by paler areas which may form irregular bars. There are often small white specks on some of the scales. Further back the dark spots are usually arranged in longitudinal lines giving a striped effect. The underparts are whitish or pale yellow, with some spotting on the sides of the neck and sometimes elsewhere. There are usually 19 dorsal scales around the mid-body, 160 to 187 belly scales and 80 to 116 pairs of under-tail scales.

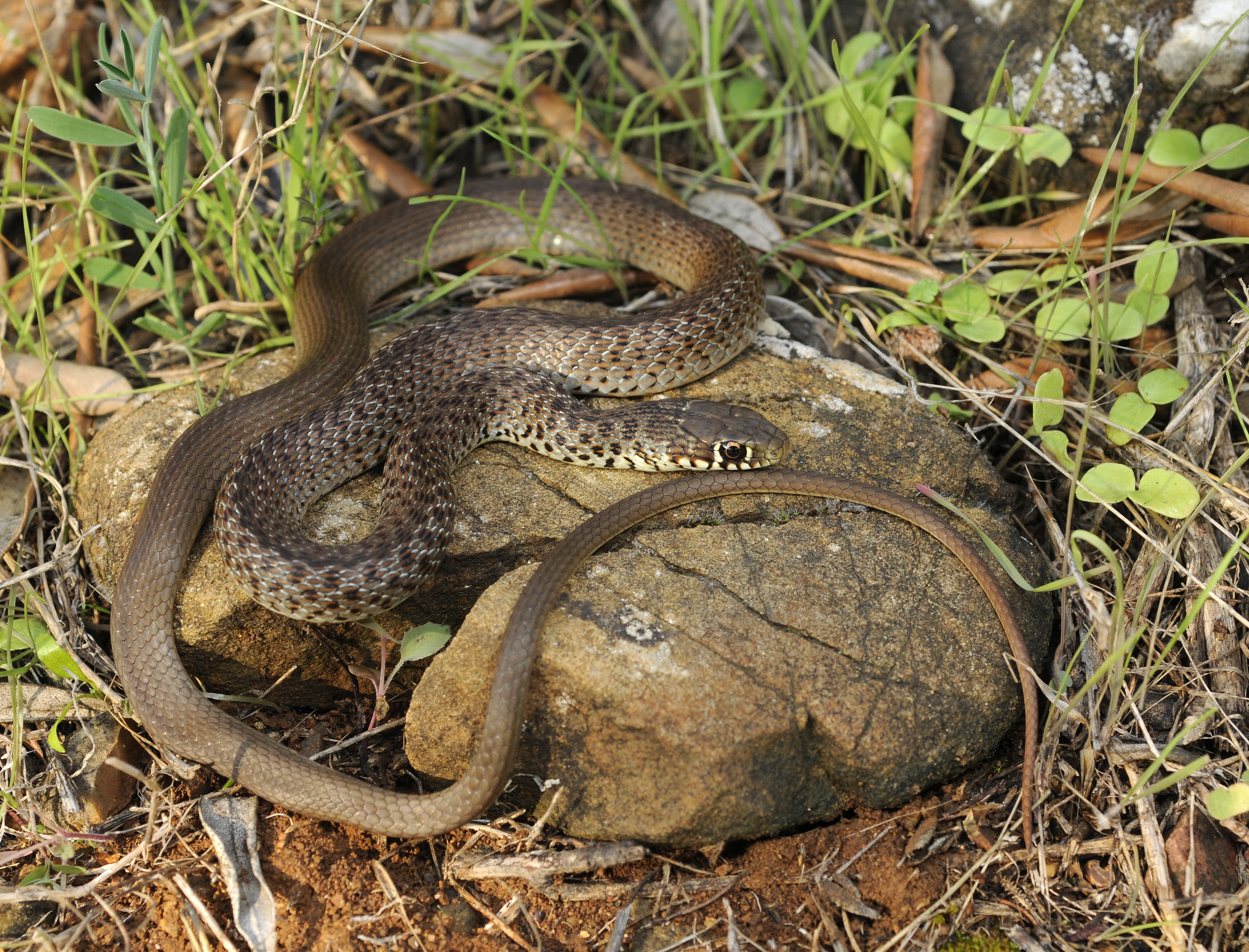

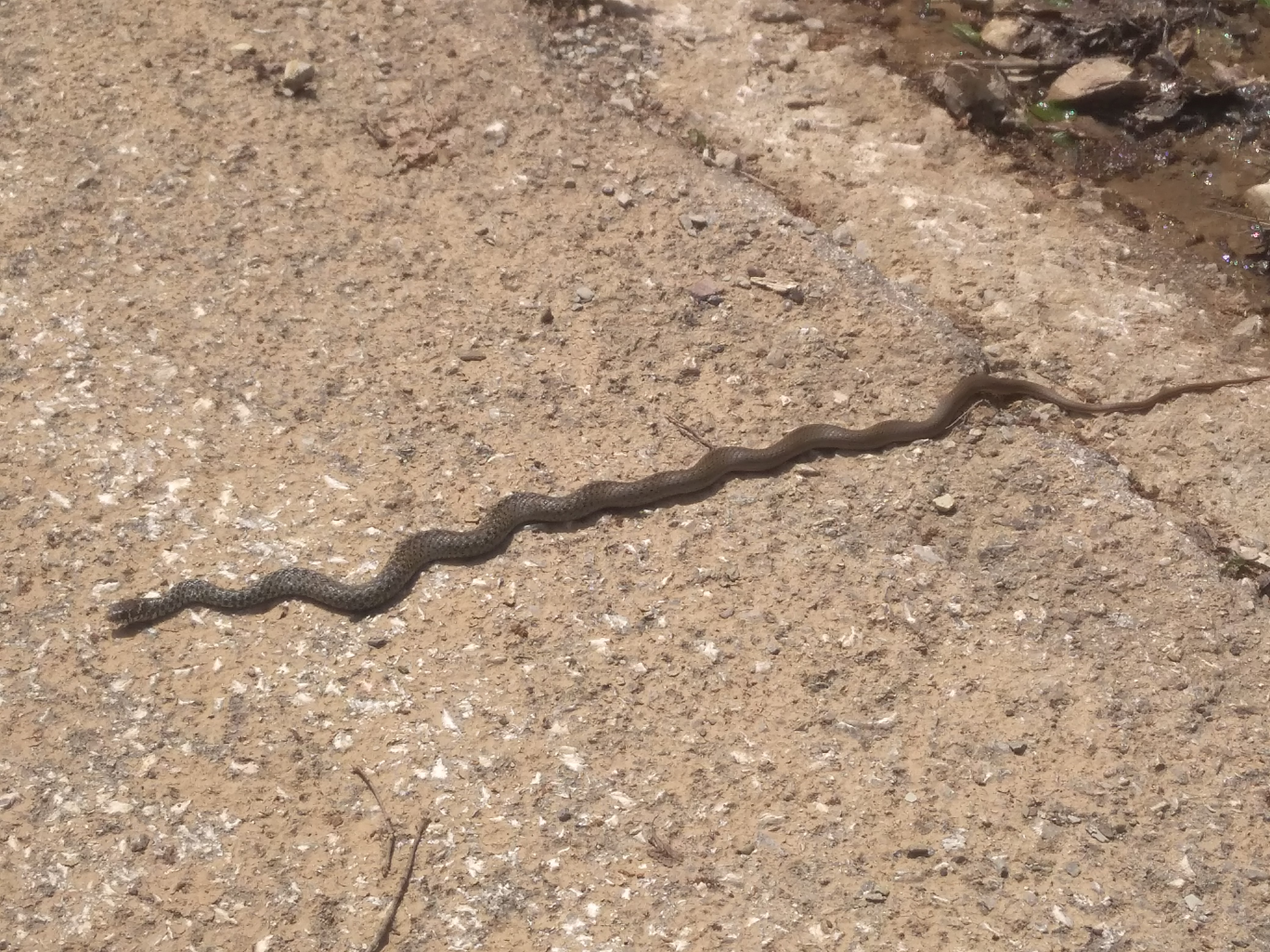
South Pindus

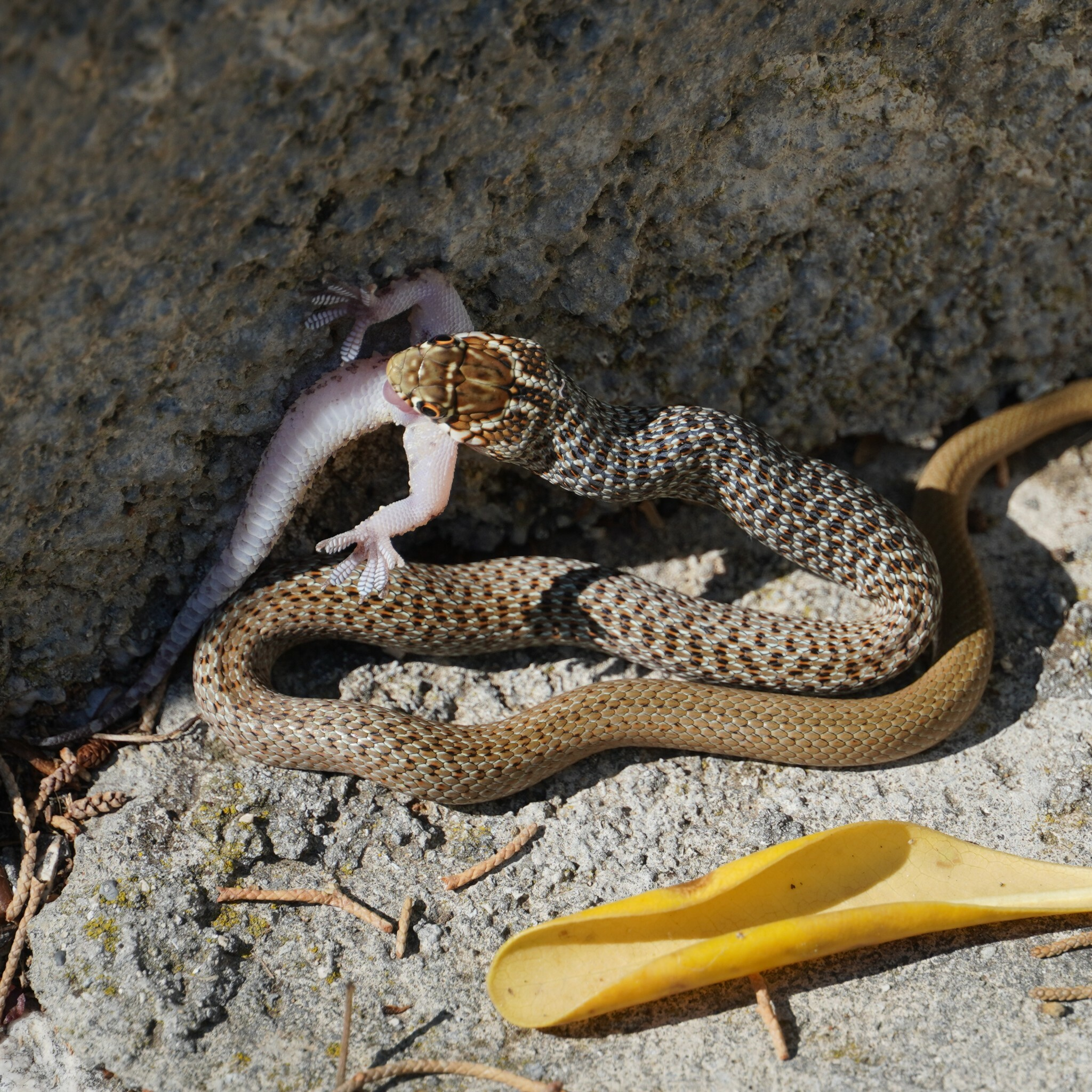
Eating a Mediterranean house gecko

== Distribution and habitat ==
The Balkan whip snake is found in extreme northeastern Italy, the former Yugoslavia, Albania and mainland Greece as well as many offshore islands. It is also present on Crete, the Ionian Islands, Euboea, Kythera and Karpathos. Its typical habitat is stony areas, scree, scrub, open woodland, road banks and ruins.

== Behaviour ==
The Balkan whip snake is a diurnal, ground-dwelling species though it does sometimes clamber through low vegetation. It is fast and agile and feeds on lizards, large insects such as grasshoppers, nestling birds, and small mammals. Females lay clutches of four to ten oval eggs measuring about 30 by 17 mm (1.2 by 0.7 in). It hibernates in winter in such places as rock fissures, animal burrows or outbuildings and sometimes several snakes will share a hibernating site.

== Conservation status ==
The Balkan whip snake has a wide range and is common within much of its range. The species has been subject to some loss of habitat due to agriculture, fire and pollution. However, the International Union for Conservation of Nature has assessed it as being of "least concern".

== See also ==
- List of reptiles of Italy
