= List of reptiles of Italy =

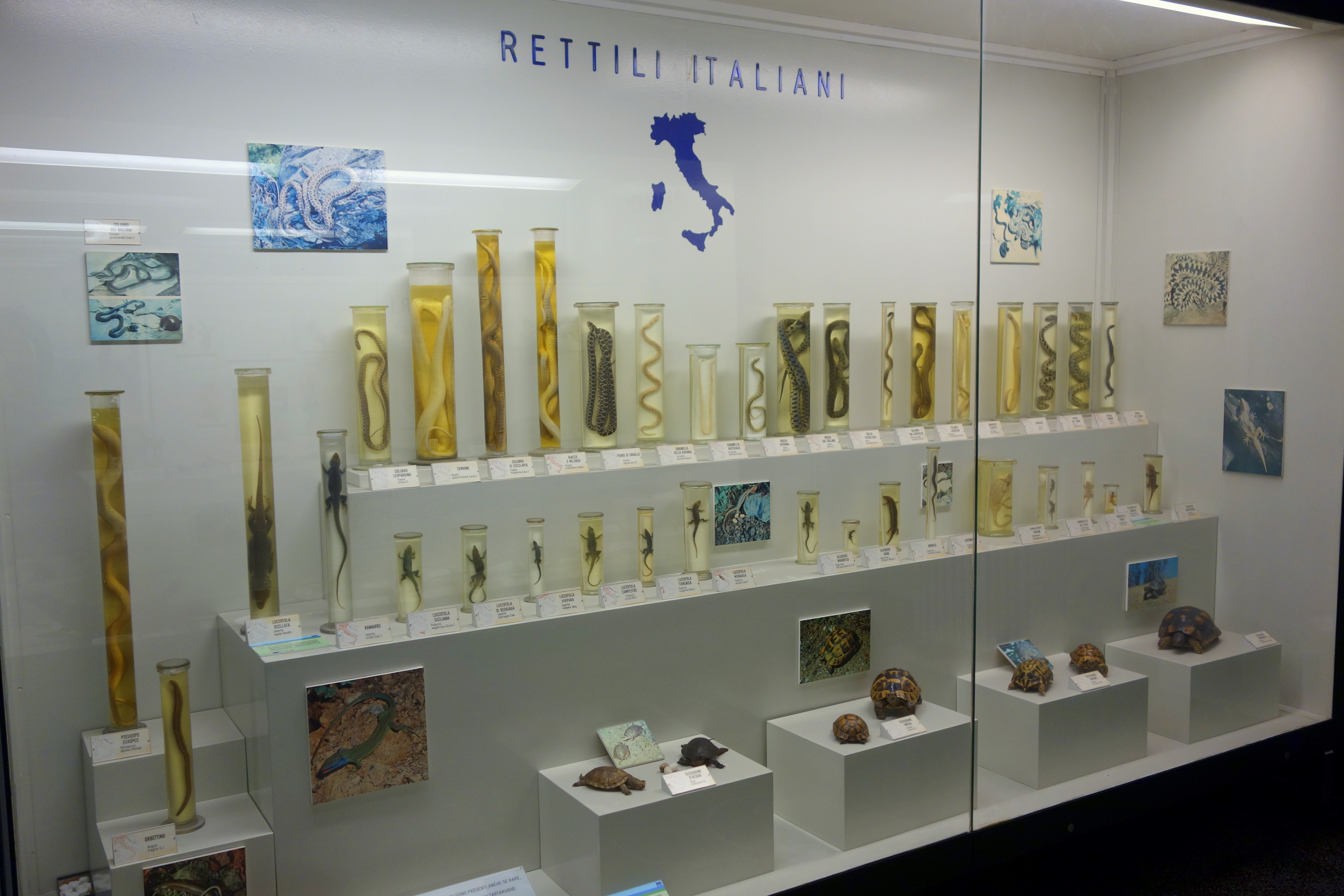
Display of Italian reptiles at the Museo Civico di Storia Naturale Giacomo Doria

The Italian reptile fauna totals 58 species (including introduced and naturalised species). They are listed here in three systematic groups (Sauria, Serpentes, and Testudines) in alphabetical order by scientific name.

The following tags are used to highlight each species' IUCN Red List status as published by the International Union for Conservation of Nature:

EX	Extinct	No reasonable doubt that the last individual has died.
EW	Extinct in the wild	Known only to survive in captivity or as a naturalized populations well outside its previous range.
CR	Critically endangered	The species is in imminent risk of extinction in the wild.
EN	Endangered	The species is facing an extremely high risk of extinction in the wild.
VU	Vulnerable	The species is facing a high risk of extinction in the wild.
NT	Near threatened	The species does not meet any of the criteria that would categorise it as risking extinction but it is likely to do so in the future.
LC	Least concern	There are no current identifiable risks to the species.
DD	Data deficient	There is inadequate information to make an assessment of the risks to this species.

== Sauria (lizards) ==
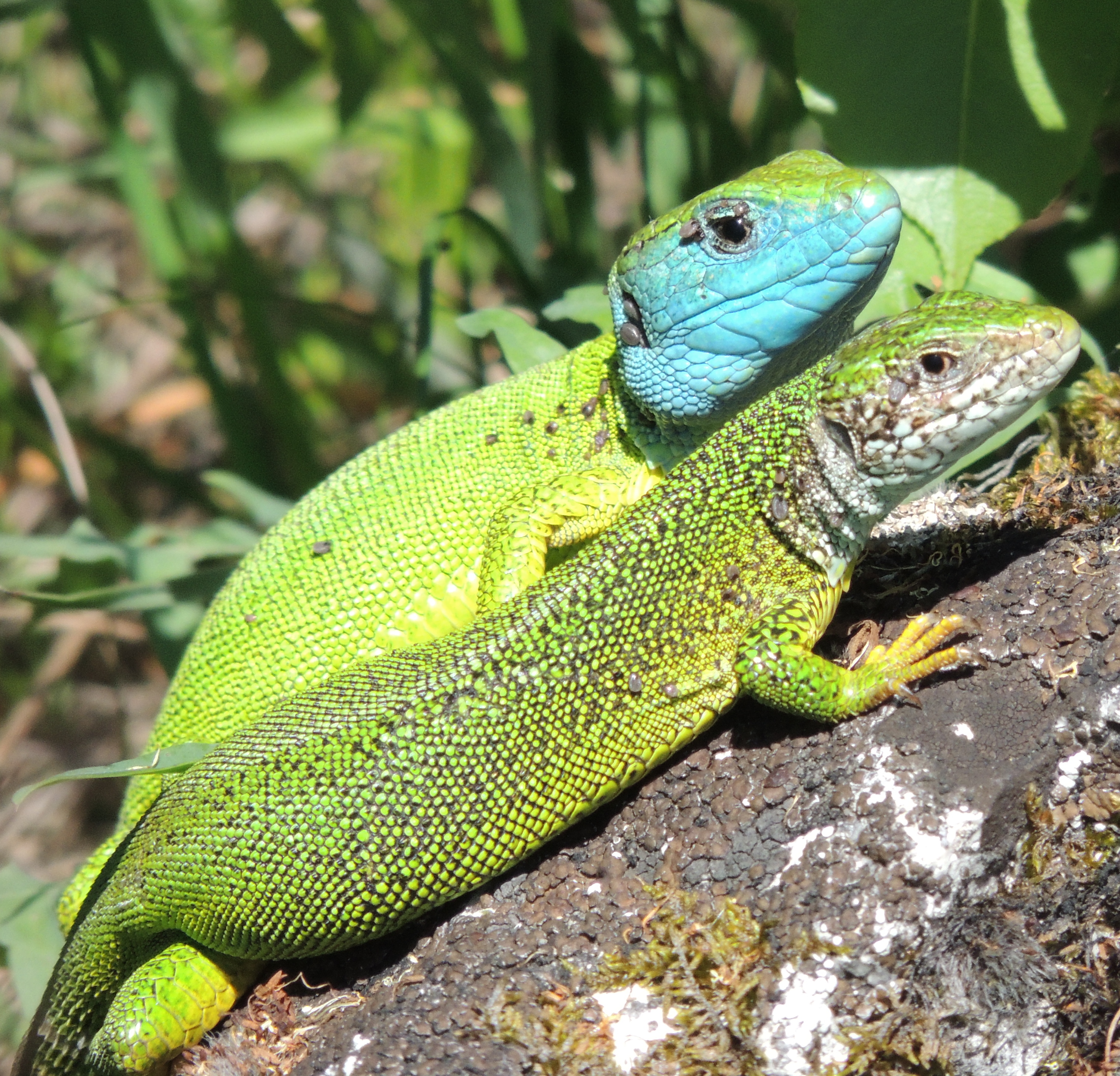
European green lizards

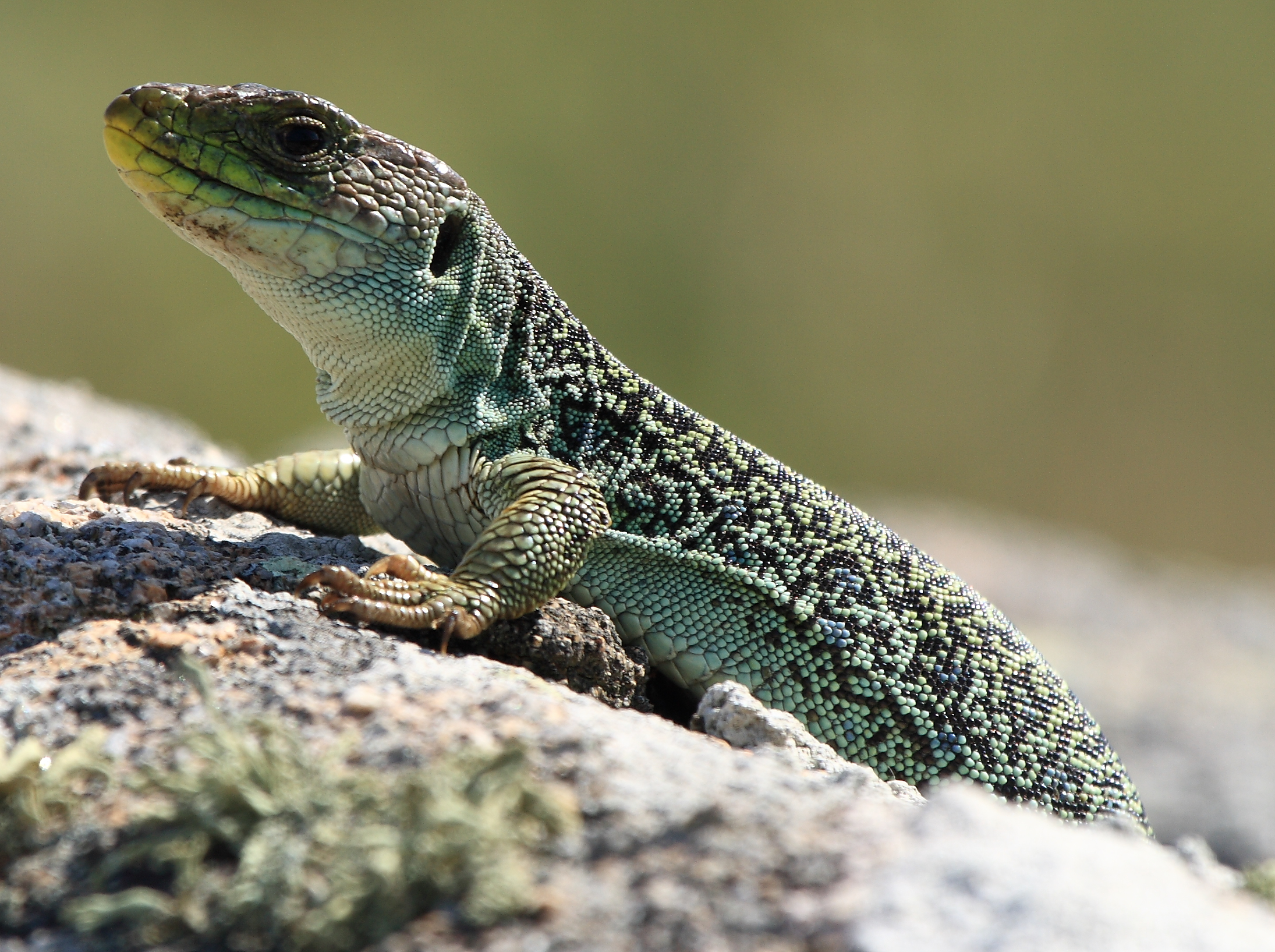
Ocellated lizard

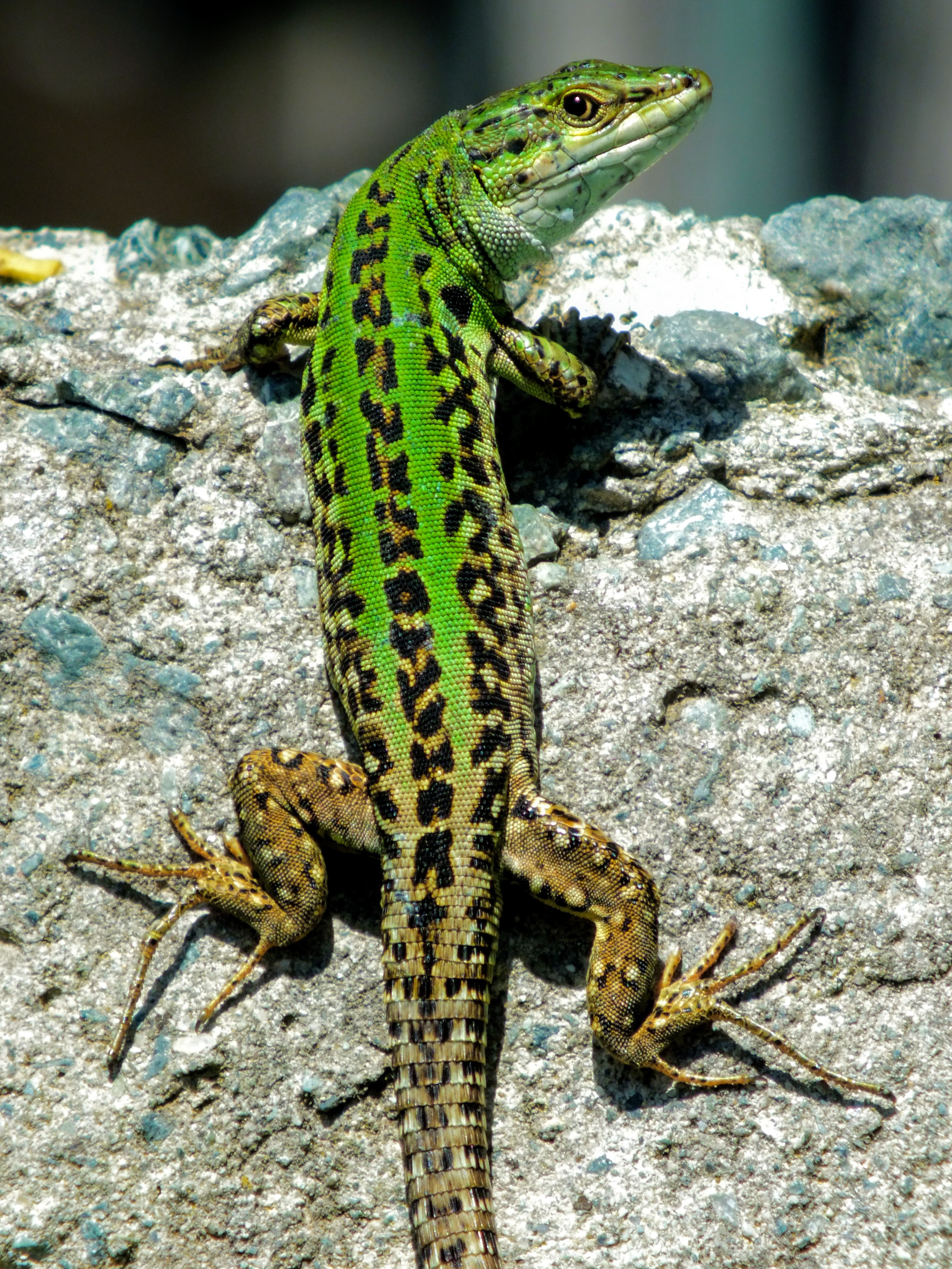
Italian wall lizard

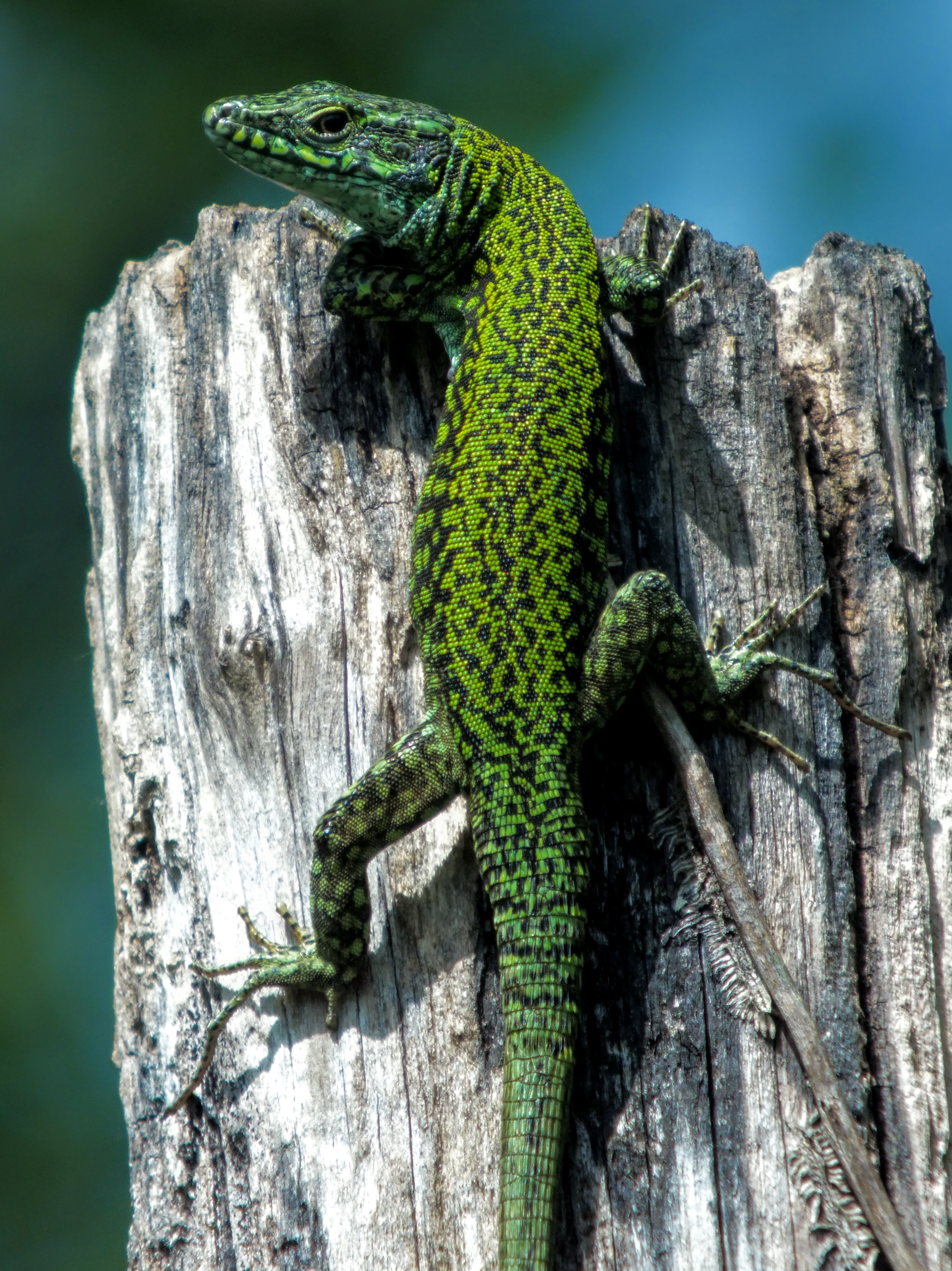
Common wall lizard

- Algyroides fitzingeri – Fitzinger's keeled lizard LC (endemic to Sardinia and Corsica)
- Algyroides nigropunctatus – blue-throated keeled lizard LC
- Anguis fragilis – common slowworm NE
- Anguis veronensis – Italian slowworm NE
- Archaeolacerta bedriagae – Bedriaga's rock lizard NT
- Chalcides chalcides – Italian three-toed skink LC
- Chalcides striatus – western three-toed skink LC
- Chalcides ocellatus – ocellated skink NT
- Chamaeleo chamaeleon – Mediterranean chameleon
- Cyrtopodion kotschyi – tree gecko LC
- Euleptes europaea – European leaf-toed gecko NT
- Hemidactylus turcicus – Mediterranean house gecko LC
- Iberolacerta horvathi – Horvath's rock lizard NT
- Lacerta agilis – sand lizard LC
- Lacerta bilineata – western green lizard LC
- Lacerta viridis – European green lizard LC
- Podarcis filfolensis – Filfola lizard LC
- Podarcis melisellensis – Dalmatian wall lizard LC
- Podarcis muralis – common wall lizard LC
- Podarcis raffonei – Aeolian wall lizard CR
- Podarcis siculus – Italian wall lizard LC
- Podarcis tiliguerta – Tyrrhenian wall lizard LC
- Podarcis waglerianus – Sicilian wall lizard LC (endemic to Sicily)
- Psammodromus algirus – large psammodromus LC
- Pseudopus apodus – European legless lizard, sheltopusik NE
- Tarentola mauritanica – Moorish wall gecko LC
- Timon lepidus – ocellated lizard NT
- Zootoca vivipara – viviparous lizard LC

== Serpentes (snakes) ==
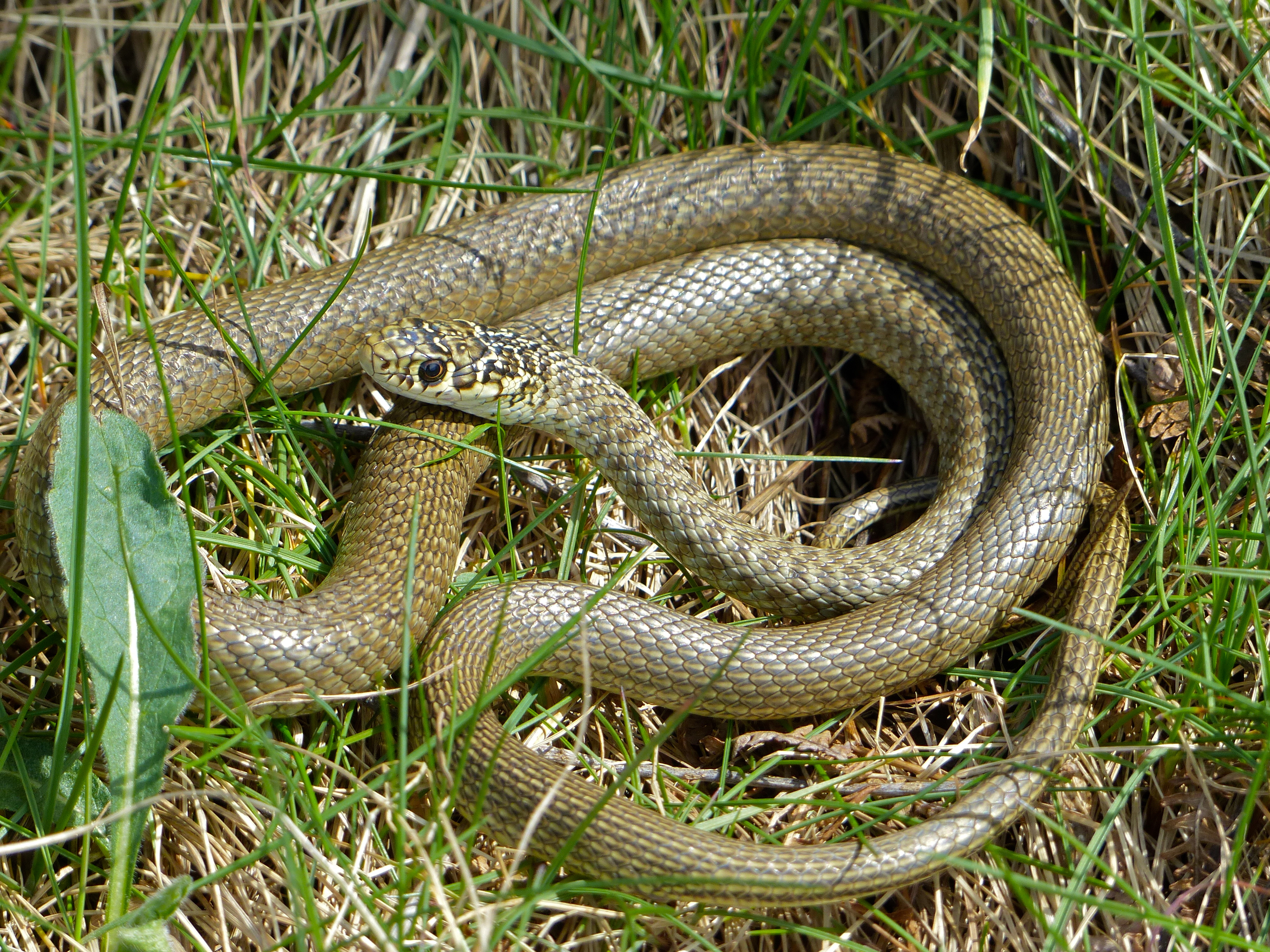
Western whip snake

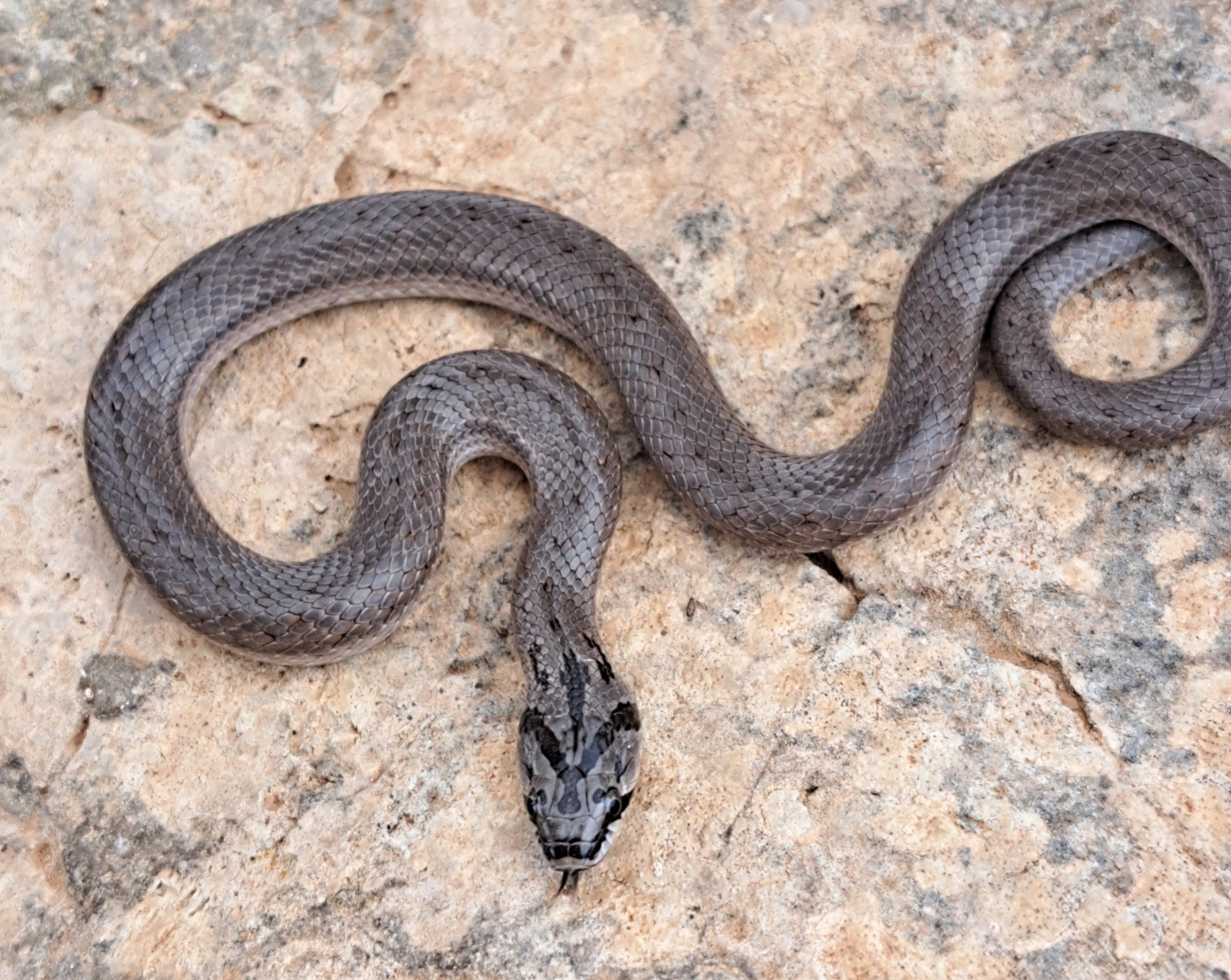
False smooth snake

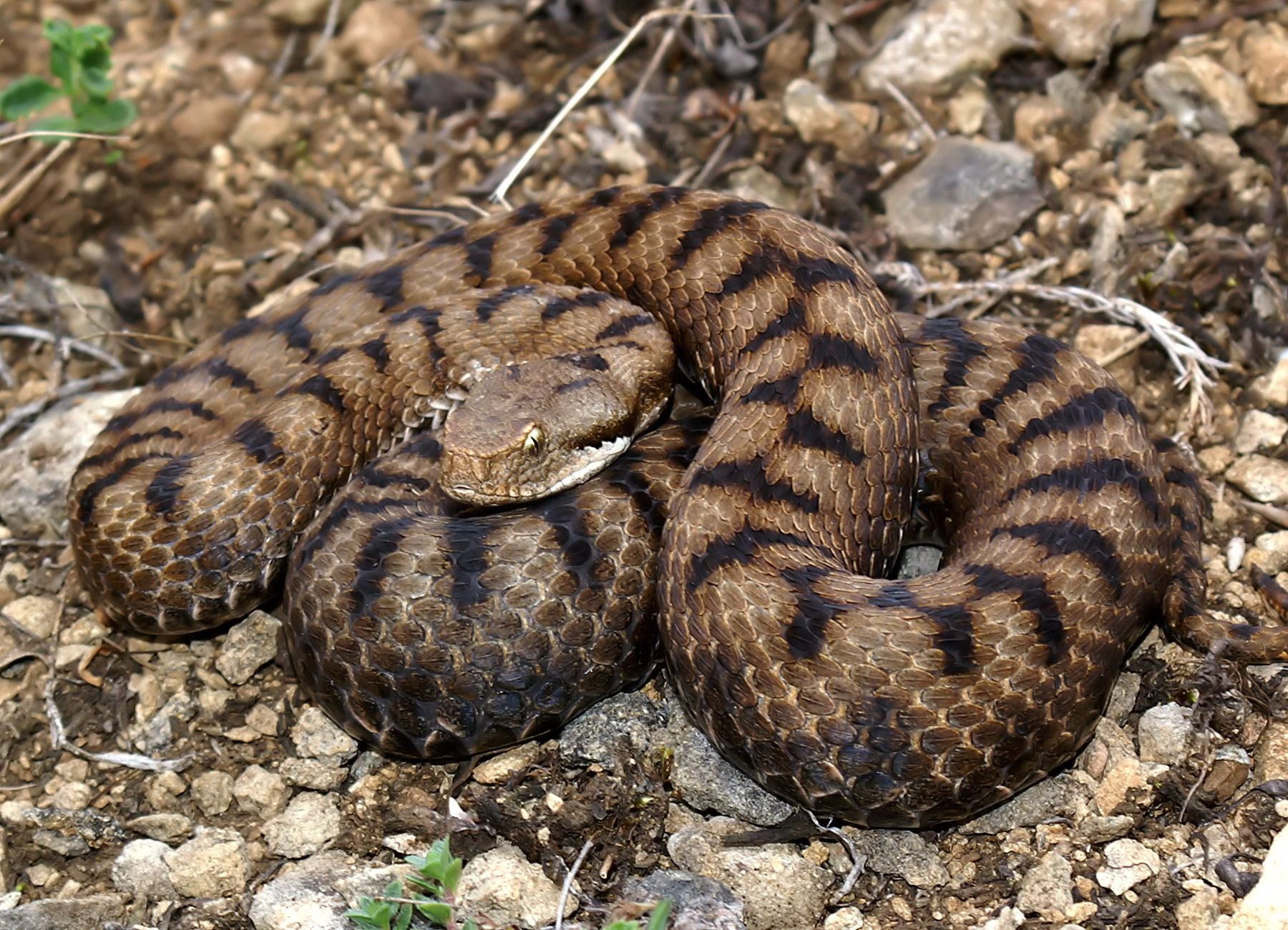
Asp viper

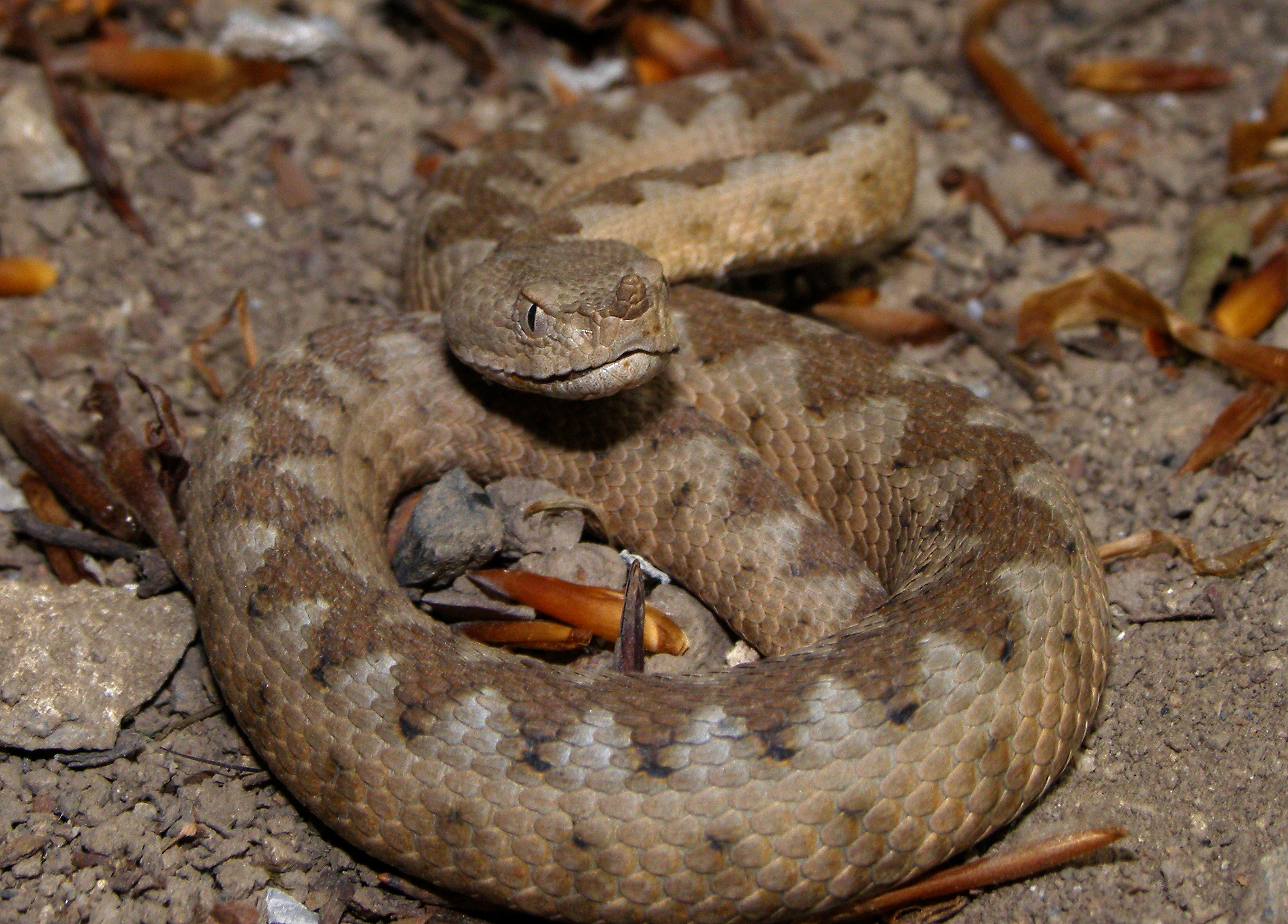
Horned viper

- Coronella austriaca – smooth snake LC
- Coronella girondica – Riccioli's snake, southern smooth snake LC
- Elaphe quatuorlineata – four-lined snake NT
- Eryx jaculus - javelin sand boa NE
- Hemorrhois hippocrepis – horseshoe whip snake LC
- Hierophis gemonensis - Balkan whip snake LC
- Hierophis viridiflavus - green whip snake LC
- Macroprotodon cucullatus – false smooth snake LC
- Malpolon monspessulanus – Montpellier snake LC
- Natrix helvetica – grass snake LC
- Natrix maura – viperine snake LC
- Natrix tessellata – dice snake LC
- Telescopus fallax – European cat snake LC
- Vipera (Rhinaspis) ammodytes – horned viper LC
- Vipera (Rhinaspis) aspis – asp viper LC
- Vipera (Pelias) berus – European adder LC
- Vipera (Acridophaga) ursinii – Orsini's viper VU
- Vipera walser - Walser's viper
- Zamenis lineatus – Italian Aesculapian snake DD (endemic to Italy)
- Zamenis longissimus – Aesculapian snake LC
- Zamenis situla – European ratsnake LC

== Testudines (turtles and tortoises) ==
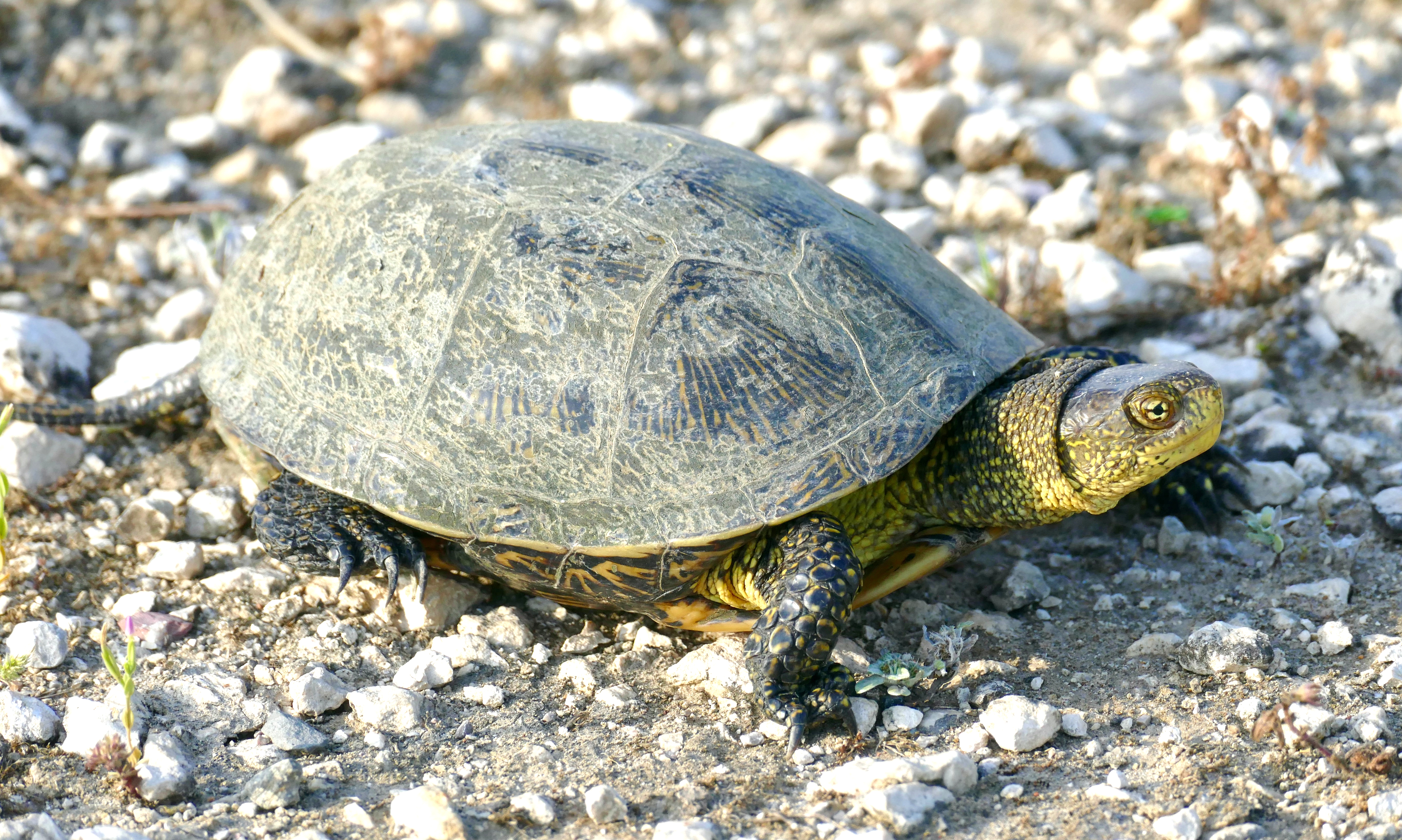
European pond turtle

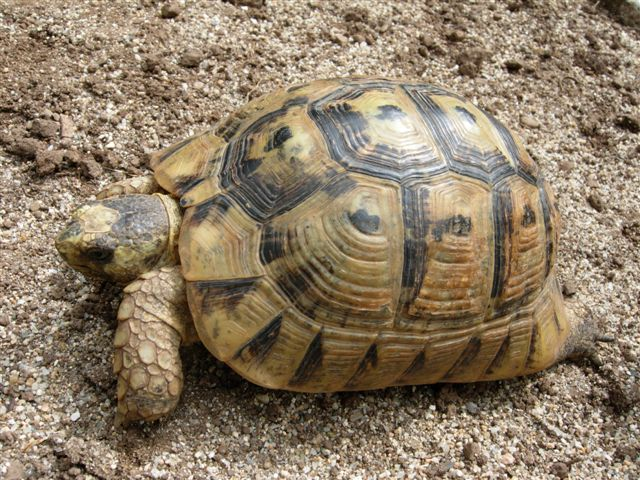
Spur-thighed tortoise

- Caretta caretta – loggerhead sea turtle LC
- Chelonia mydas – green sea turtle EN
- Chelydra serpentina – common snapping turtle (introduced)
- Dermochelys coriacea – leatherback sea turtle VU
- Emys orbicularis NT
  - Emys orbicularis orbicularis – European pond turtle
  - Emys orbicularis galloitalica – Franco-Italian pond turtle
  - Emys orbicularis hellenica – Hellenic pond turtle
  - Emys orbicularis ingauna – Ligurian pond turtle
- Emys trinacris – Sicilian pond turtle DD
- Lepidochelys kempii – Kemp's ridley sea turtle CR
- Testudo graeca – spur-thighed tortoise VU
- Testudo hermanni – Hermann's tortoise EN
- Testudo marginata – marginated tortoise LC
- Trachemys scripta elegans – red-eared slider NE (introduced)
