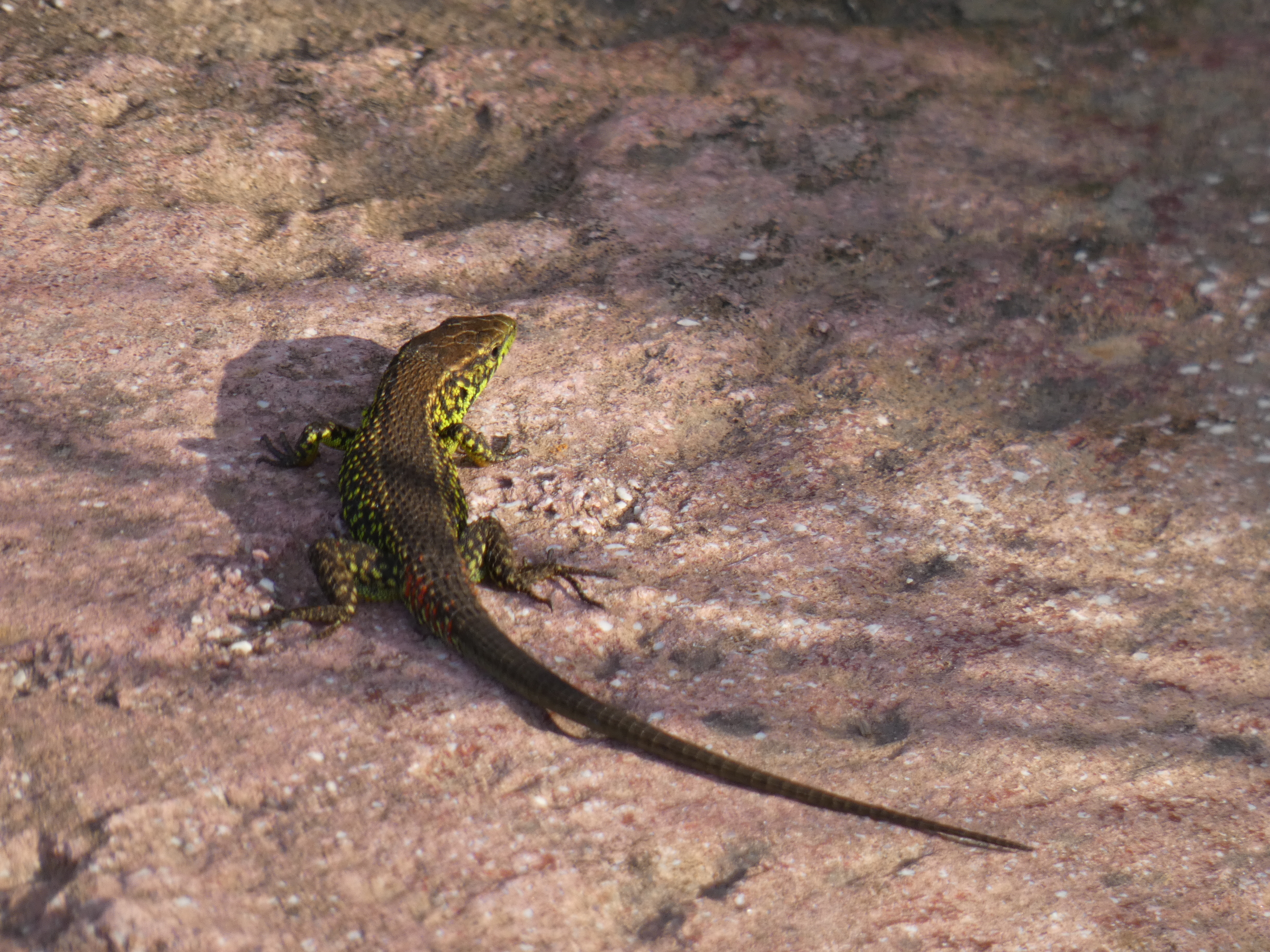
- Male, Kefalonia
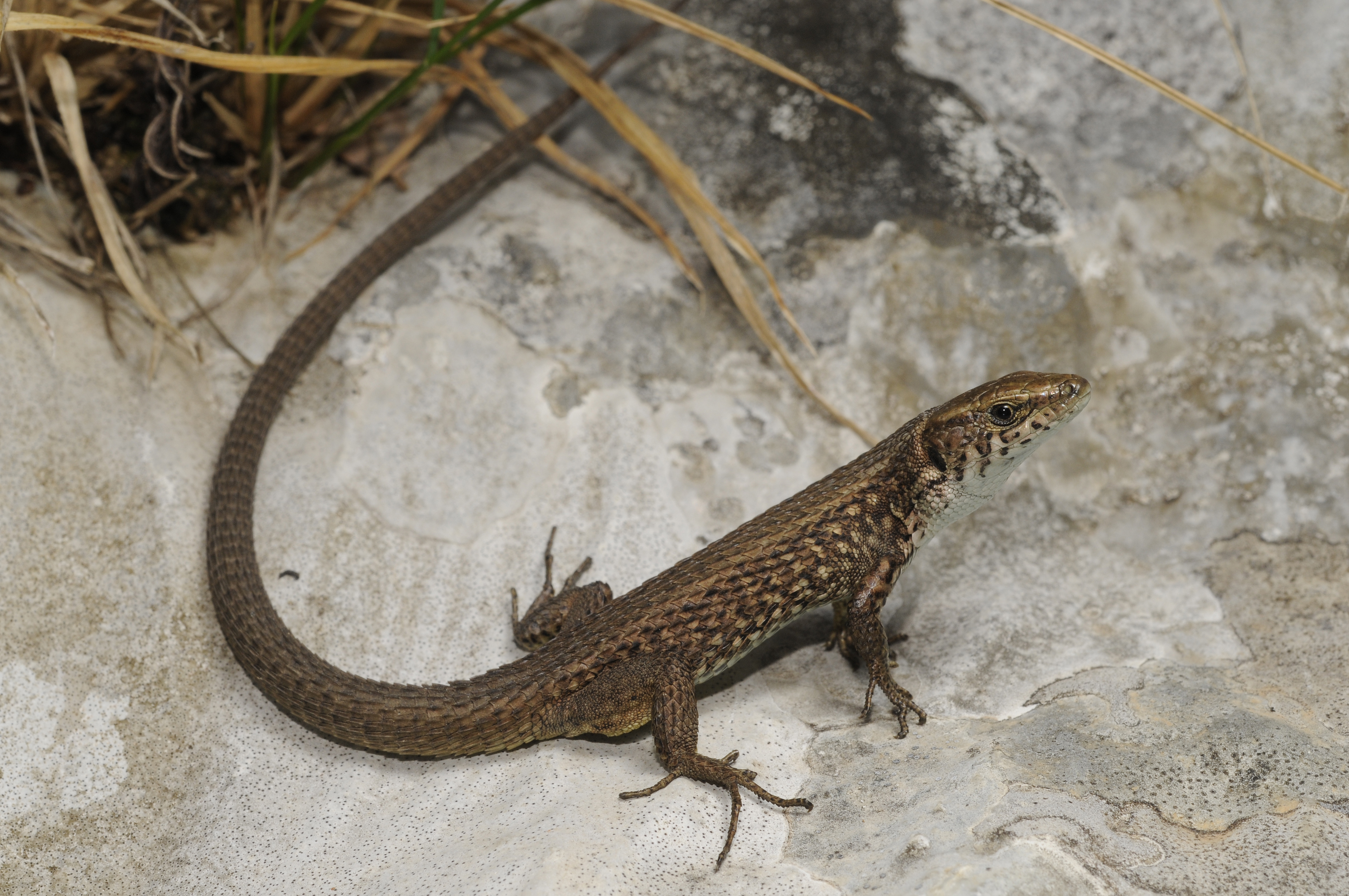
- Young male, Peloponnese

Conservation status
- Near Threatened (IUCN 3.1)

Scientific classification
- Kingdom: Animalia
- Phylum: Chordata
- Class: Reptilia
- Order: Squamata
- Family: Lacertidae
- Genus: Algyroides
- Species: A. moreoticus

Binomial name
- Algyroides moreoticus Bibron & Bory, 1833

= Greek algyroides =

Species of lizard

The Greek algyroides (Algyroides moreoticus), or Greek keeled lizard, is a species of lizard in the family Lacertidae. It is endemic to Greece.

== Classification ==
The Greek algyroides was first formally described in 1833 by the French biologists Gabriel Bibron and Jean-Baptiste Bory de Saint-Vincent with its type locality given as "Koubeh" in the Peloponnese. Algyroides moreoticus is the type species of the genus Algyroides which is classified within the tribe Lacertini of the subfamily Lacertinae in the family Lacertidae, the "typical lizards" or "wall lizards" of Africa and Eurasia.

== Description ==
The Greek algyroides is a small lizard with the typical large, keeled scales of the genus Algyroides on their backs. The males are more colourful than the inconspicuous, brownish females and different populations have differing colour patterns on their flanks. The males on Zakynthos have yellow colour on their flanks, those on Kefalonia and Ithaka have blue flanks while those on the mainland Peloponnese have black and white flanks.

== Distribution and habitat ==
The Greek algyroides is endemic to Greece where it is found on the Peloponnese Peninsula and the Ionian Islands of Zakynthos, Kefalonia, Ithaka and on the Strofades. It is found in open woods, hedgerows and on the margins of farmland where there is shade or partial shade. These lizards seem to prefer damp areas and to hides among ground cover, like brushwood and leaf litter.

== Biology ==
The Greek algyroides may be often be encountered basking on wood or tree trunks in the late afternoon, in the hotter months of summer they can be more cryptic in behaviour. The female Greek algyroides lay only a few eggs in each clutch.

== Conservation status ==
The Greek algyroides is classified as near threatened by the IUCN, the main threat being habitat loss.
