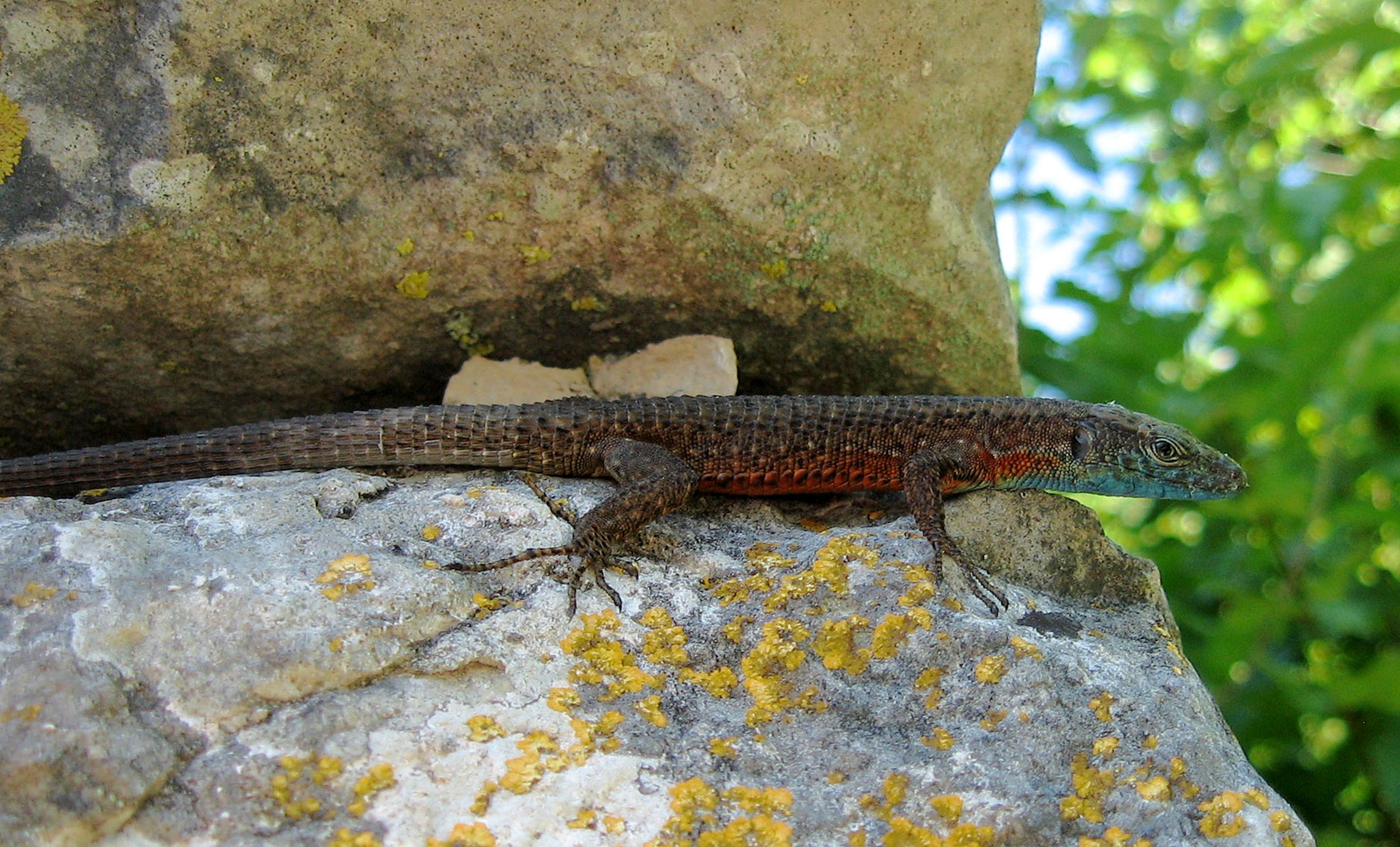
- Algyroides nigropunctatus

Scientific classification
- Kingdom: Animalia
- Phylum: Chordata
- Class: Reptilia
- Order: Squamata
- Family: Lacertidae
- Subfamily: Lacertinae
- Genus: Algyroides; Bibron & Bory, 1833

Type species
- Algyroides moreoticus Bibron & Bory, 1833

Species
- See text.

= Algyroides =

Genus of lizards

Algyroides is a genus of lizards, commonly called keeled lizards, in the subfamily Lacertinae of the family Lacertidae. Species of the genus Algyroides are native to southern Europe.

== Species ==
The following species are recognised as being valid.

- Algyroides fitzingeri (Wiegmann, 1834) – Fitzinger's algyroides
- Algyroides hidalgoi Boscá, 1916 – Spanish algyroides, Spanish keeled lizard
- Algyroides moreoticus Bibron & Bory, 1833 – Greek algyroides, Greek keeled lizard
- Algyroides nigropunctatus A.M.C. Duméril & Bibron, 1839 – Dalmatian algyroides, blue-throated keeled lizard
