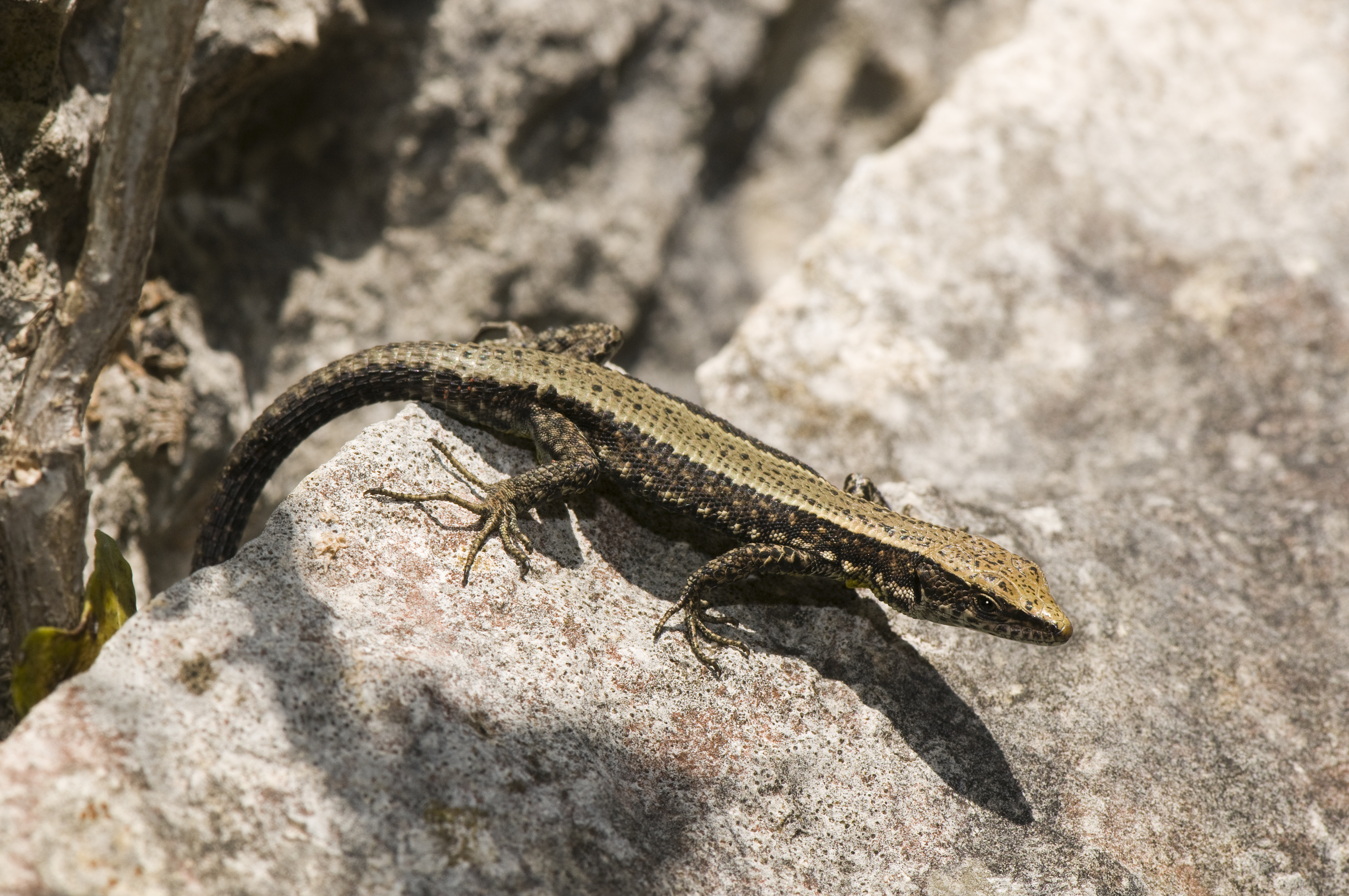

Conservation status
- Endangered (IUCN 3.1)

Scientific classification
- Kingdom: Animalia
- Phylum: Chordata
- Class: Reptilia
- Order: Squamata
- Family: Lacertidae
- Genus: Algyroides
- Species: A. hidalgoi

Binomial name
- Algyroides hidalgoi Boscá, 1916
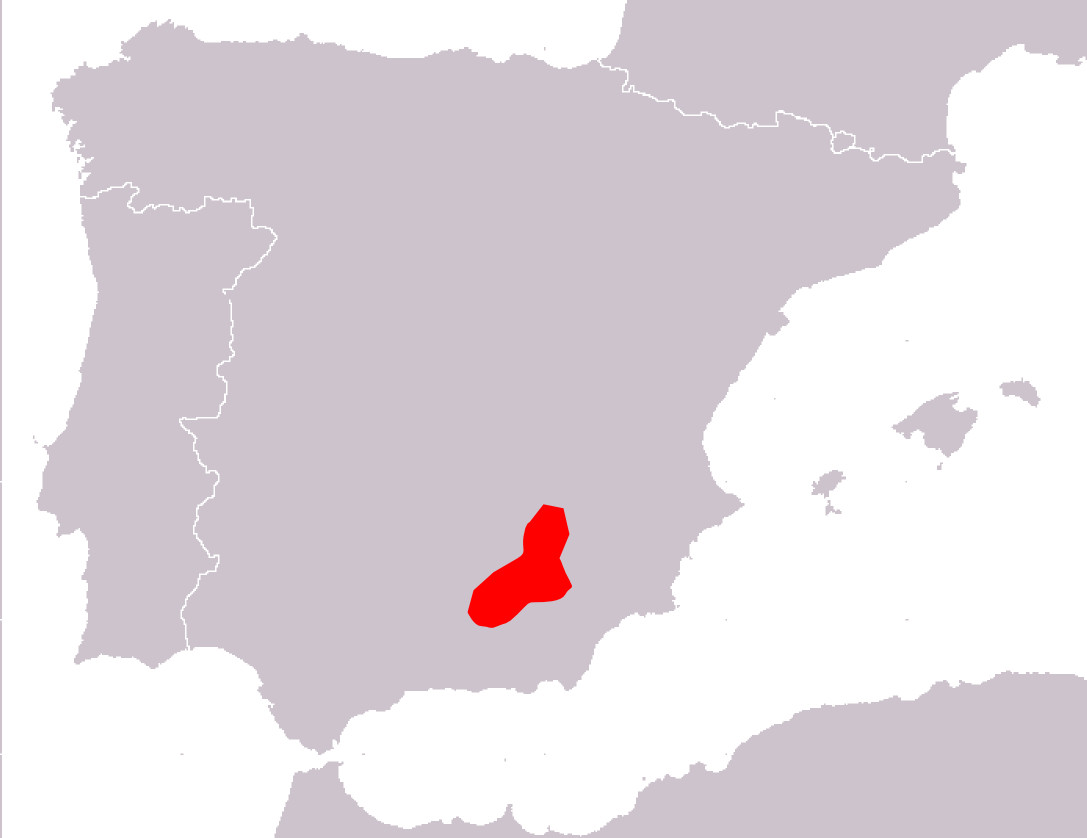

Synonyms
- Algiroides marchi Valverde, 1958; Algyroides marchi — Buchholz, 1965

= Spanish algyroides =

Species of lizard

The Spanish algyroides (Algyroides hidalgoi), also commonly known as the Spanish keeled lizard or Valverde's lizard, is a species of lizard in the family Lacertidae. The species is endemic to Spain.

== Geographic range ==
Algyroides hidalgoi occurs in southeastern Spain.

== Habitat ==
The natural habitats of the Spanish algyroides are temperate forests, rivers, and rocky areas, at altitudes of 700–1,700 m (2,300–5,600 ft).

== Reproduction ==
Algyroides hidalgoi is oviparous.

== Conservation status ==
Algyroides hidalgoi is threatened by habitat loss.

== Etymology ==
The synonym, Algiroides marchi, was named in honor of Spanish financier Juan March.
