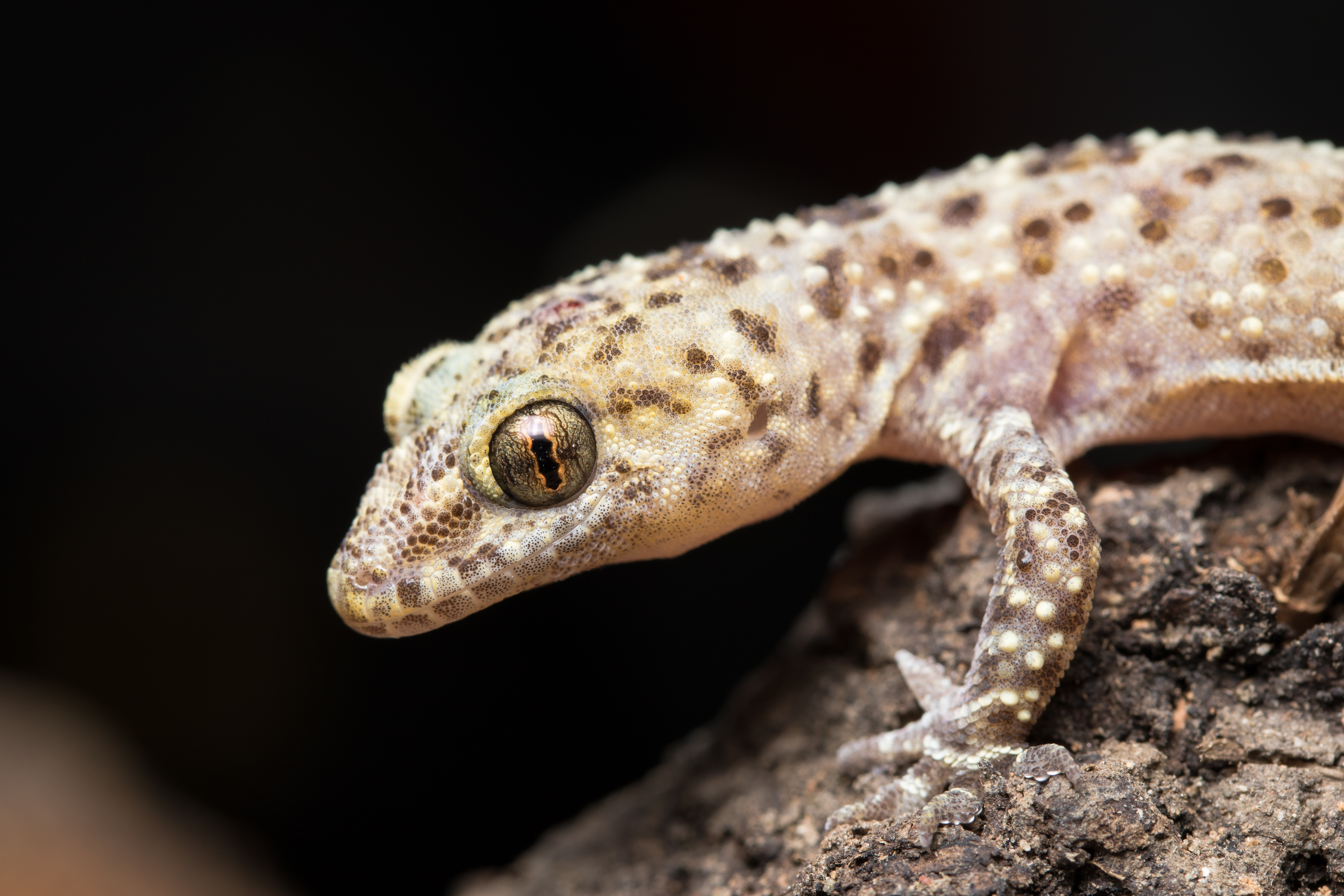
- Mediterranean house gecko in Rhodes, Greece

Conservation status
- Least Concern (IUCN 3.1)

Scientific classification
- Kingdom: Animalia
- Phylum: Chordata
- Class: Reptilia
- Order: Squamata
- Suborder: Gekkota
- Family: Gekkonidae
- Genus: Hemidactylus
- Species: H. turcicus

Binomial name
- Hemidactylus turcicus (Linnaeus, 1758)
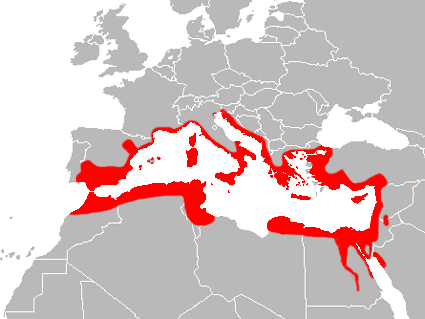
- Native range

= Mediterranean house gecko =

Species of reptile

The Mediterranean house gecko (Hemidactylus turcicus) is a species of house gecko native to the Mediterranean region, from which it has spread to many parts of the world including parts of East Africa, South America, the Caribbean, and the Southern and Southeastern United States. It is commonly referred to as the Turkish gecko as represented in its Latin name and also as the moon lizard because it tends to emerge in the evening.

A study in Portugal found H. turcicus to be totally nocturnal, with its highest activity around 02:00. It is insectivorous, rarely exceeds 15 cm (5.9 in) in length, has large, lidless eyes with elliptical pupils, and purple or tan-colored skin with black spots, often with stripes on the tail. Its belly or undersides are somewhat translucent. What impact this gecko has on native wildlife in the regions to which it has been introduced is unknown.

In many parts of the world, the range of H. turcicus is increasing, and unlike many other reptiles, it appears to be highly resistant to pesticides. The increase may be explained as a consequence of having few predators in places where it has been introduced, and also of its tendency to take shelter in the cracks and unseen areas of human homes, for example inside walls. Reliance on human habitation has thus contributed to the species' proliferation, similar to rodents. In some Eastern Mediterranean countries such as Greece, Turkey and Cyprus, harming H. turcicus is taboo due to its benign nature, and it is often kept as a house pet.

== Description ==
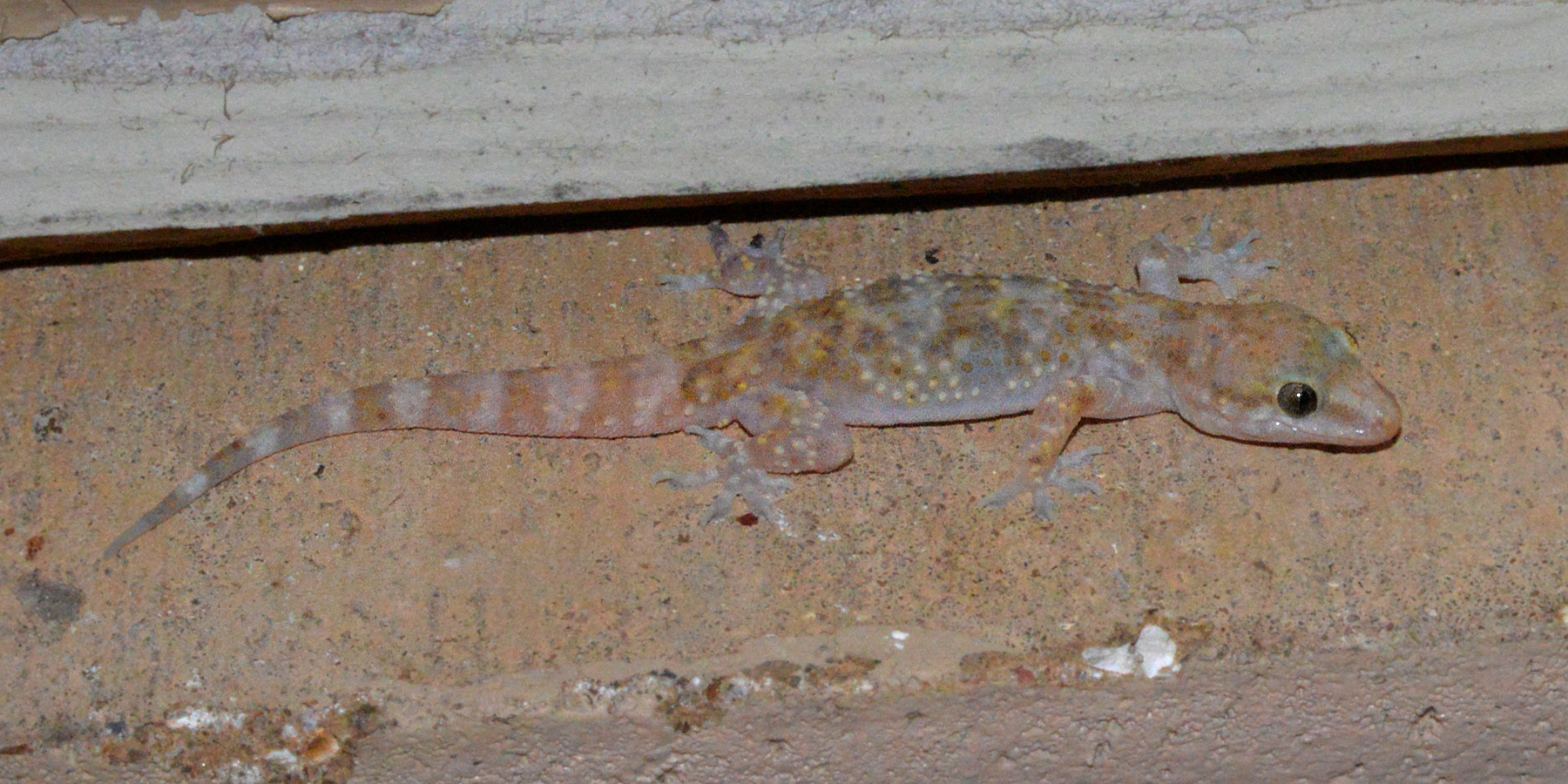
Mediterranean house gecko, (Hemidactylus turcicus), Chambers County, Texas

The Mediterranean gecko is a very small lizard generally measuring 10–13 cm (4–5 inches) in length, with sticky toe pads, vertical pupils, and large eyes that lack eyelids. Its snout is rounded, about as long as the distance between the eye and the ear opening, 1.25 to 1.3 times the diameter of the orbit; the forehead is slightly concave; the ear opening is oval, oblique, and nearly half the diameter of the eye. Body and limb sizes are moderate. The digits are variable in length, with the inner always well developed; 6 to 8 lamellae are under the inner digits, 8 to 10 are under the fourth finger, and 9 to 11 are under the fourth toe. The head has large granules anteriorly, but posteriorly has minute granules intermixed with round tubercles. The rostrum is four-sided, not twice as broad as deep, with amedial cleft above; the nostril is pierced between the rostrum, the first labial, and three nasals; it has 7 to 10 upper and 6 to 8 lower labials; the mental is large, triangular, and at least twice as long as the adjacent labials; its point is between two large chin-shields, which may be in contact behind it; a smaller chin shield on each side of the larger pair. Upper surface of body covered with minute granules intermixed with large tubercles, which are generally larger than the spaces between them, suboval and trihedral in shape, and arranged in 14 or 16 pretty, regular, longitudinal series. Abdominal scales are small, smooth, roundish-hexagonal, and imbricate. Males have a short angular series of four to 10 (exceptionally two) preanal pores. The tail is cylindrical, slightly depressed, tapering, and covered above with minute scales and a transverse series of large, keeled tubercles, and covered beneath with a series of large, transversely dilated plates. Its color is light brown or grayish above, with darker spots; many of the tubercles and the lower surfaces are white. They may be completely translucent except for the spotting. Some are darker.

They often seek darkness when fleeing. They may be seen alone or in a group up to five or more together.

== Geographic distribution ==
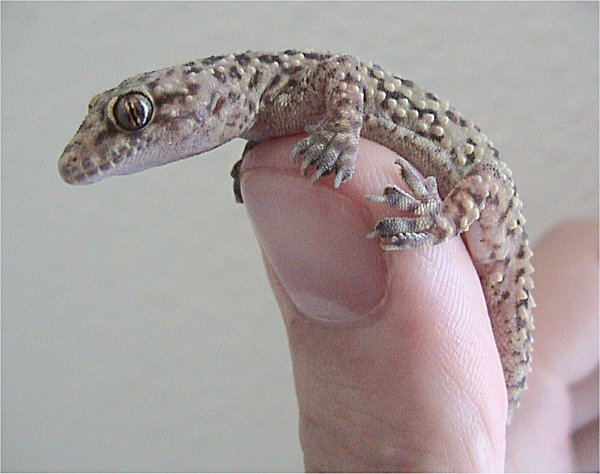
Gecko being handled by a human

Native to the Mediterranean region, the "Med gecko" is one of the most successful species of geckos in the world. It has spread over much of the world and established stable populations far from its native range; it holds no threatened or endangered status. It can be found in countries with Mediterranean climates, such as Portugal, Spain, France, Italy, Greece, Israel, Malta, southern Bulgaria, North Macedonia, coastal Croatia (except western Istria), Bosnia and Herzegovina, the Adriatic islands, coastal Montenegro, the coastal part of Albania, Cyprus, Turkey, northern Morocco, Algeria, Tunisia, Jordan, Syria, Libya, Egypt, Lebanon, northern Yemen (the Socotra Archipelago), Somalia, Eritrea, Kenya, southern Iran, Iraq, Oman, Qatar, Saudi Arabia, Pakistan, India, the Balearic Islands (Island Addaya Grande), the Canary Islands (introduced to Gran Canaria and Tenerife), Panama, Puerto Rico, Belize, and Cuba.

As of 1974, it was known from scattered records in the Southwestern United States, including Arizona, California, Nevada, and New Mexico and more extensively in the Southern United States, including Alabama, Arkansas, Florida, Georgia, Kansas, Kentucky, Louisiana, Maryland, Mississippi, Missouri, North Carolina, Oklahoma, South Carolina, Texas, and Virginia, being particularly well-established in Gulf Coast states in the east. More recently records have been published from several localities in Pennsylvania, and Tennessee. It was also reported from Indiana in 2019 but, it was unknown at that time if the individual represented an established population or not.

In Mexico, introductions are known to the states Tamaulipas, Veracruz, Tabasco, Campeche, Yucatán, Baja California, Chihuahua, Coahuila, Sonora, Durango, and Nuevo León.

== Habitat ==
Mediterranean house geckos inhabit a wide range of habitats, in areas near human presence such as university campuses, cemeteries, coastal regions, and shrublands. In these urban or suburban areas, they are typically seen in the cracks of old brick buildings. Compared to a more natural setting, these urban environments contain less complex habitats, aiding in their overall success across their range. They can also be found in other areas such as mountain cliffs and caves. Their nests can be found in trash piles, attics, or under the baseboards of buildings.

== Behavior ==
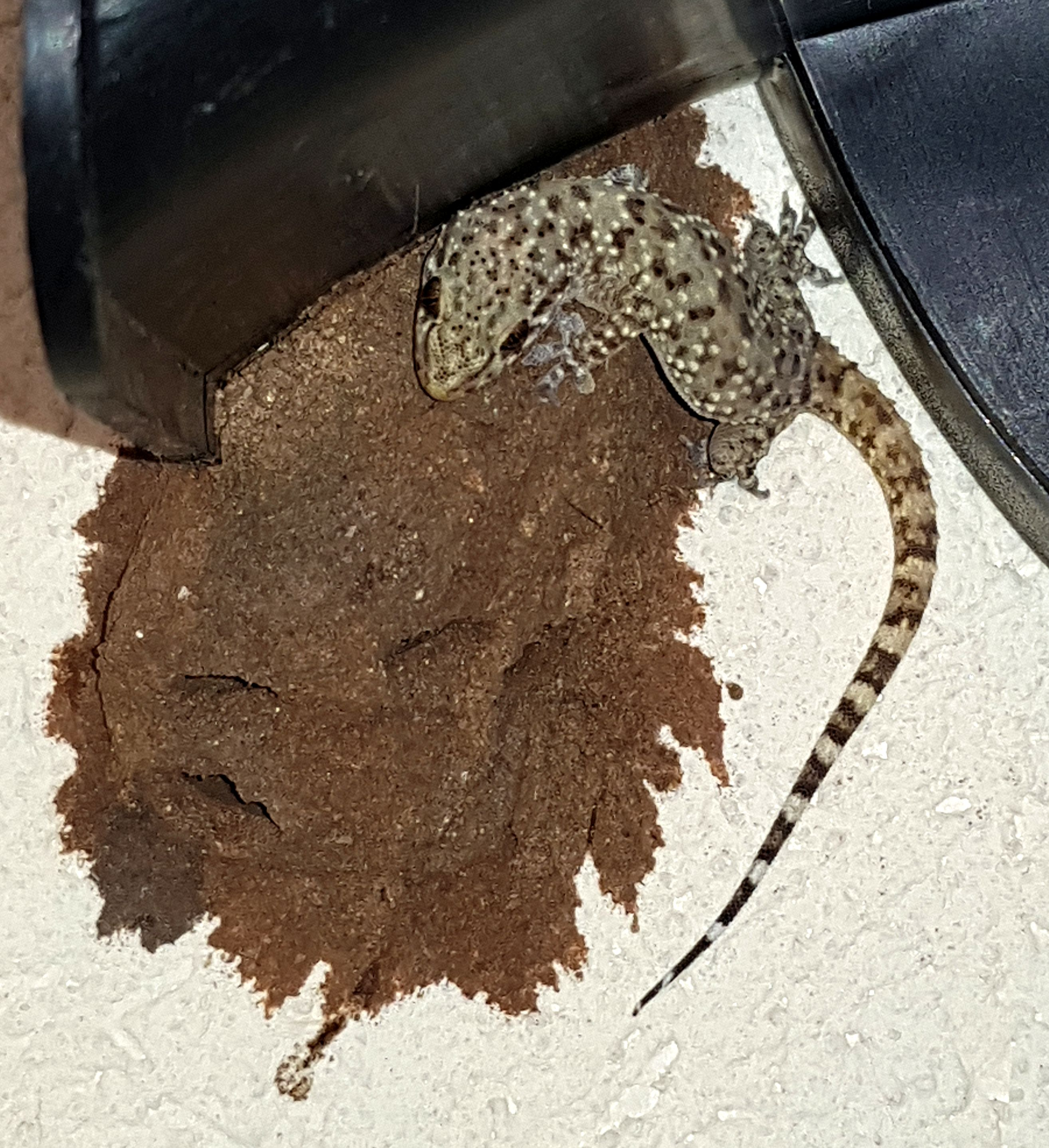
A Mediterranean house gecko in ambush on a nest of a sphecid wasp Sceliphron spirifex

Mediterranean house geckos are nocturnal. They emit a distinctive, high-pitched call somewhat like a squeak or the chirp of a bird, possibly expressing a territorial message. Because of this aggressive behavior, juveniles avoid most interaction with adult geckos. They are voracious predators of moths and small roaches and are attracted to outdoor lights in search of these prey. Areas around outdoor lighting provide an opportunity for longer strike distances since there is often little structure in the adjacent area. They are also attracted by the call of a male decorated cricket (Gryllodes supplicans); although the males are usually safely out of reach in a burrow, female crickets attracted to the male's call can be intercepted and eaten.

== Reproduction ==
Mediterranean house geckos reach sexual maturity within four months to a year. Male house geckos produce clicking sounds to attract a mate, with the females responding in their own squeaks. They also display copulatory biting, with stronger bites resulting in higher fertilization success. Fertilization is internal. The breeding season is typically from April to August each year and eggs are laid mid-May to August in an average clutch size of two. Female house geckos experience delayed fertilization and can store sperm in a funnel-shaped organ called the infundibulum for up to five months. Because of this, exact gestation time is unknown, but is estimated to be around 40–60 days. Neither males nor females have been observed providing any parental care, with males going as far as to bite the juveniles.

== Prey ==
Primary prey of Mediterranean house geckos has been noted to include crickets, grasshoppers, cockroaches, spiders, beetles, moths, butterflies, ants, isopods, and snails. These geckos are visual hunters; prey selection depends on whether it is alive or dead. Mediterranean house geckos are more likely to choose living prey over dead.

== Gallery ==
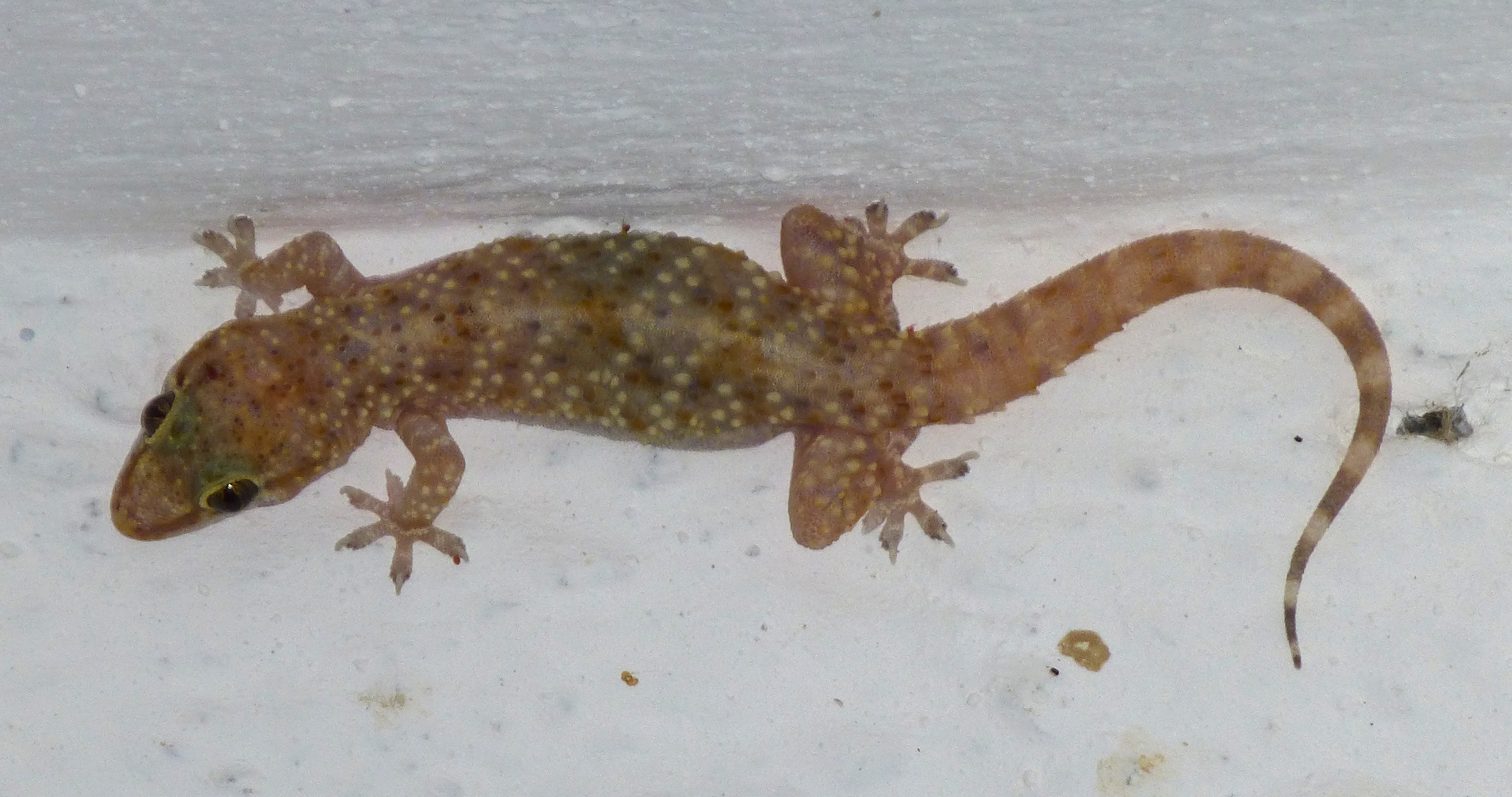
Mediterranean house gecko, Mugla Province, Turkey

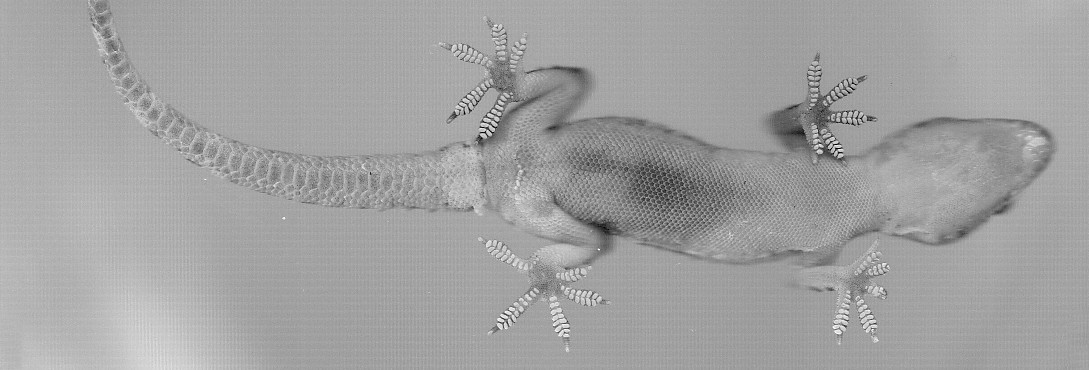
Scan of the ventral side of a Mediterranean house gecko, showing details of skin and toepads

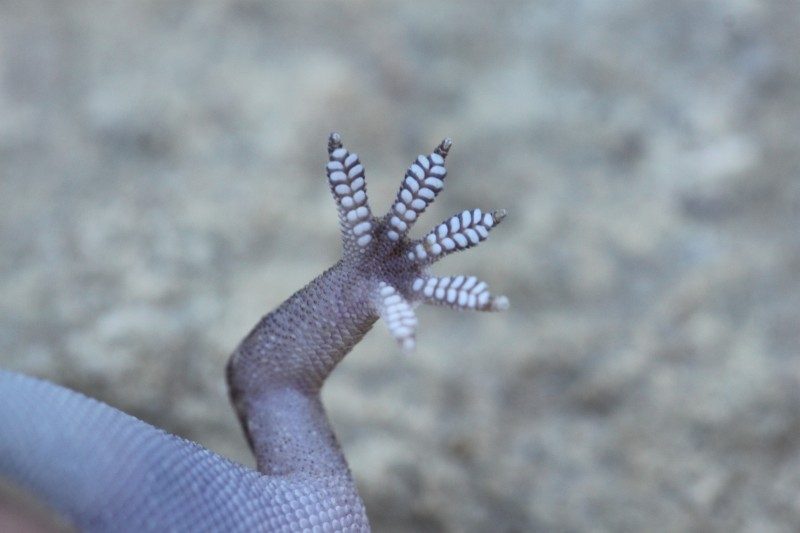
Close-up of a foot and toe pads of Mediterranean house gecko, Paphos, Cyprus

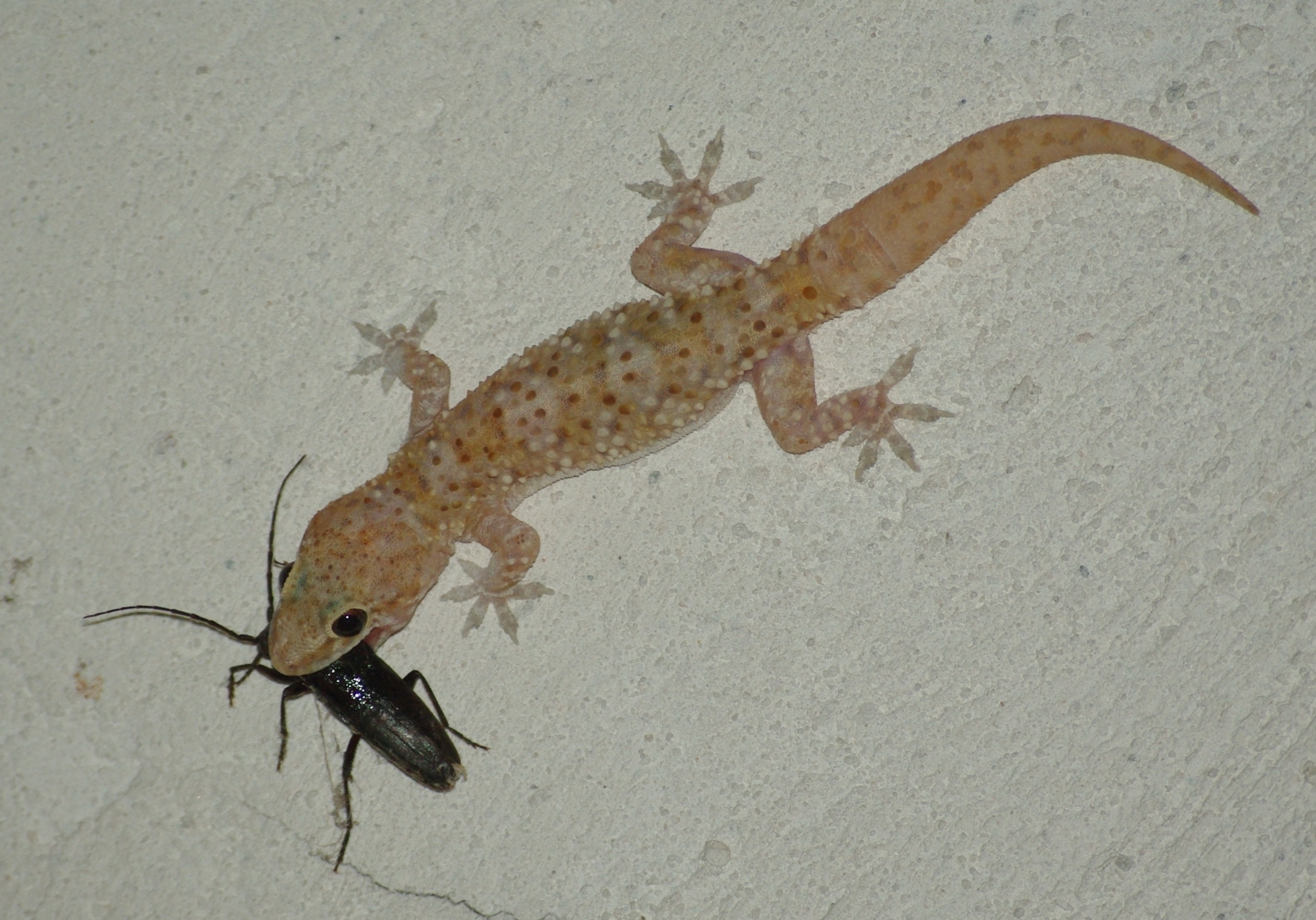
Gecko with prey (longhorn beetle, Cerambycidae) on a wall in Messenia, Greece

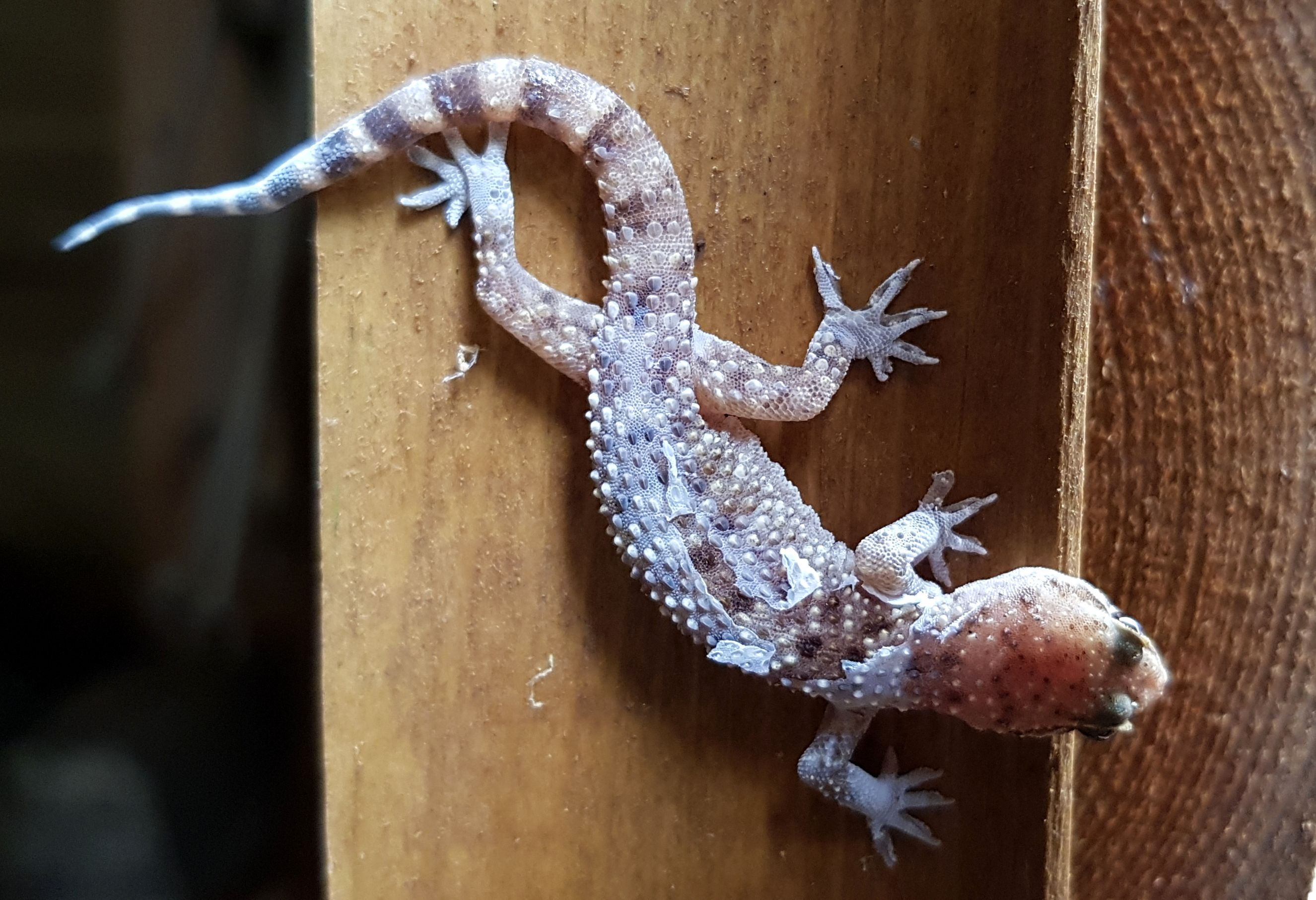
A young Mediterranean house gecko in the process of moulting

A Mediterannean house gecko stuck in a Teflon pan

== See also ==
- List of reptiles of Italy
