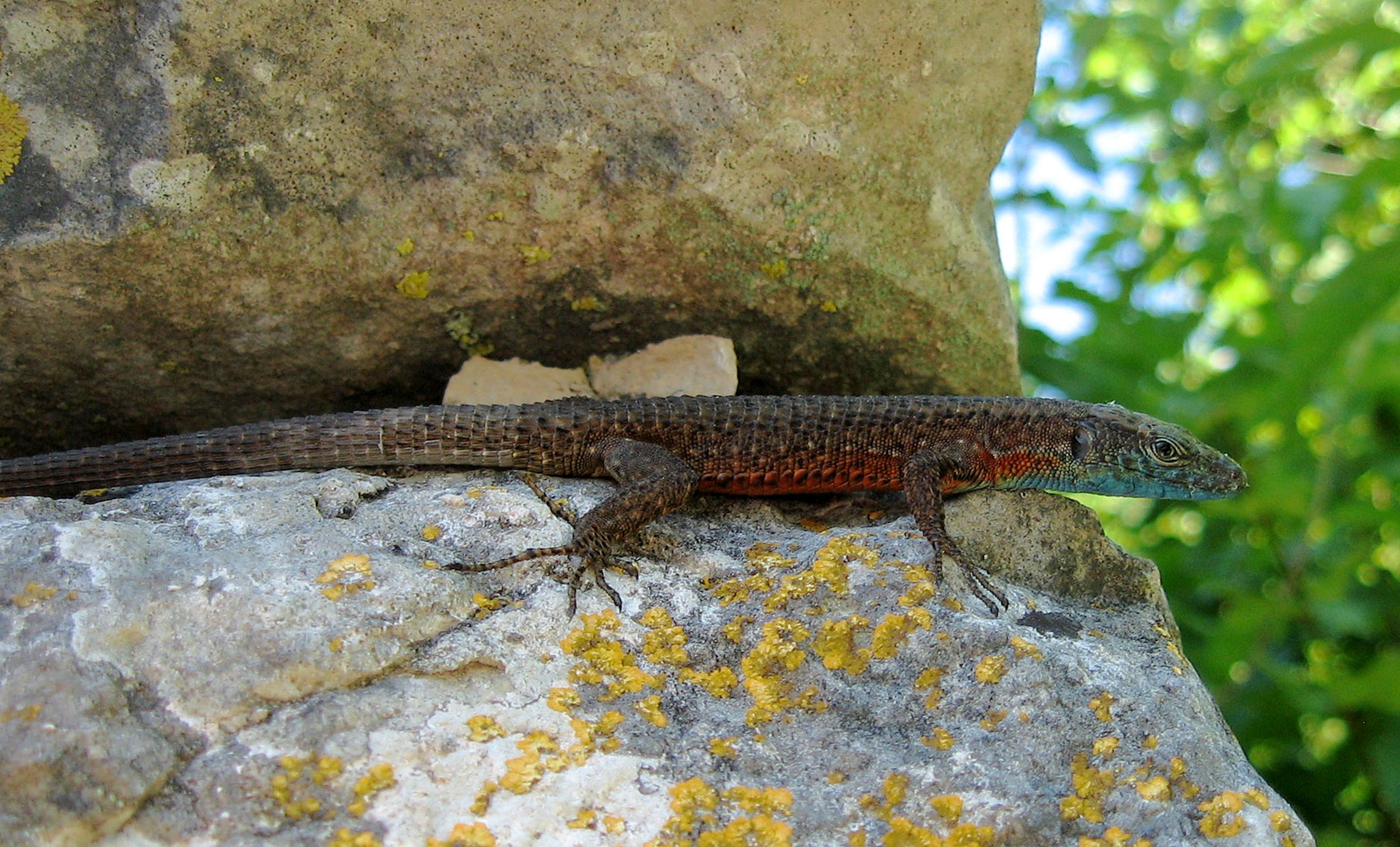

Conservation status
- Least Concern (IUCN 3.1)

Scientific classification
- Kingdom: Animalia
- Phylum: Chordata
- Class: Reptilia
- Order: Squamata
- Family: Lacertidae
- Genus: Algyroides
- Species: A. nigropunctatus

Binomial name
- Algyroides nigropunctatus (A.M.C. Duméril & Bibron, 1839)

Synonyms
- Lacerta nigro-punctatus A.M.C. Duméril & Bibron, 1839; Algiroides nigropunctatus — F. Werner, 1894; Algyroides nigropunctatus — Gleich, 1979

= Blue-throated keeled lizard =

Species of lizard

The blue-throated keeled lizard (Algyroides nigropunctatus), or Dalmatian algyroides, is a species of lizard in the family Lacertidae.

== Description ==
The maximum total length (including tail) is 25 cm (9.8 in) which makes it significantly larger than any of the other Algyroides species. A. nigropunctatus can be recognized by the keeled V-shaped scales on the flanks, tail and back. It owes its common name to the bright blue throat of the males in the mating season. Sometimes also females get a blue throat that is less bright. The remainder of the body is light brown to rusty brown, the belly is white to yellowish. It owes its specific name, nigropunctatus, to the rows of black dots on the back. These dots are mostly missing in females outside the mating season.

== Distribution and habitat ==
A. nigropunctatus is found in Italy and the Balkans.

The natural habitats of A. nigropunctatus are Mediterranean-type shrubby vegetation, rocky areas, arable land, pastureland, plantations, rural gardens, and urban areas.

== Behaviour and ecology ==
The food consists of insects, worms, and other small invertebrates. The blue-throated keeled lizard likes to climb. It is easily frightened and is not often kept in captivity due to its protected status.

Only two or four eggs are laid, and it has been assumed that females can produce eggs both in early spring and early autumn. The males bite the females in the neck during mating and don't let go for quite some time, which is common for Algyroides lizards.

== See also ==
- List of reptiles of Italy
