= List of reptiles of Portugal =

This is a list of the reptiles found in Portugal.

== Turtles ==
Family: Cheloniidae

- Green sea turtle (Chelonia mydas)
- Hawksbill sea turtle (Eretmochelys imbricata)
- Kemp's ridley sea turtle (Lepidochelys kempii)
- Loggerhead sea turtle (Caretta caretta)

Family: Dermochelyidae

- Leatherback sea turtle (Dermochelys coriacea)

Family: Emydinae

- European pond turtle (Emys orbicularis)
- Red-eared slider (Trachemys scripta)

Family: Geoemydidae

- Mediterranean pond turtle (Mauremys leprosa)

== Amphisbaenians (worm lizards) ==
- Blanus cinereus
- Blanus mariae

== Lizards ==
Family: Anguidae

- Slowworm (Anguis fragilis)

Family: Chamaeleonidae

- Gemeines chameleon (Chamaeleo chamaeleon)

Family: Gekkonidae

- House gecko (Hemidactylus mabouia)
- Mediterranean house gecko (Hemidactylus turcicus)
- Moorish gecko (Tarentola mauritanica)

Family: Lacertidae

- Algerian psammodromus (Psammodromus algirus)
- Andalusian wall lizard (Podarcis vaucheri)
- Bocage's wall lizard (Podarcis bocagei)
- Carbonell's wall lizard (Podarcis carbonelli)
- Iberian emerald lizard (Lacerta schreiberi)
- Iberian mountain lizard (Iberolacerta monticola)
- Iberian wall lizard (Podarcis hispanicus)
- Madeira wall lizard (Teira dugesii)
- Ocellated lizard (Timon lepidus)
- Red-tailed spiny footed lizard (Acanthodactylus erythrurus)
- Spanish psammodromus (Psammodromus hispanicus)

Family: Scinidae

- Cylindrical skink (Chalcides chalcides)
- Fogo skink (Chioninia fogoensis)
- Spanish cylindrical skink (Chalcides bedriagai)
- Western three-toed skink (Chalcides striatus)

== Snakes ==
Family: Colubridae

- False smooth snake (Macroprotodon cucullatus)
- Iberian grass snake (Natrix astreptophora)
- Horseshoe snake (Hemorrhois hippocrepis)
- Ladder snake (Rhinechis scalaris)
- Smooth snake (Coronella austriaca)
- Southern smooth snake (Coronella girondica)
- Viperine water snake (Natrix maura)
- Western false smooth snake (Macroprotodon brevis)

Family: Lamprophiidae

- Montpelier snake (Malpolon monspessulanus)

Family: Viperidae

- Lataste's viper (Vipera latastei)
- Portuguese viper (Vipera seoanei)
