= Baixa Limia – Serra do Xurés =

Natural park in the Province of Ourense, Galicia, Spain

Baixa Limia - Serra do Xurés
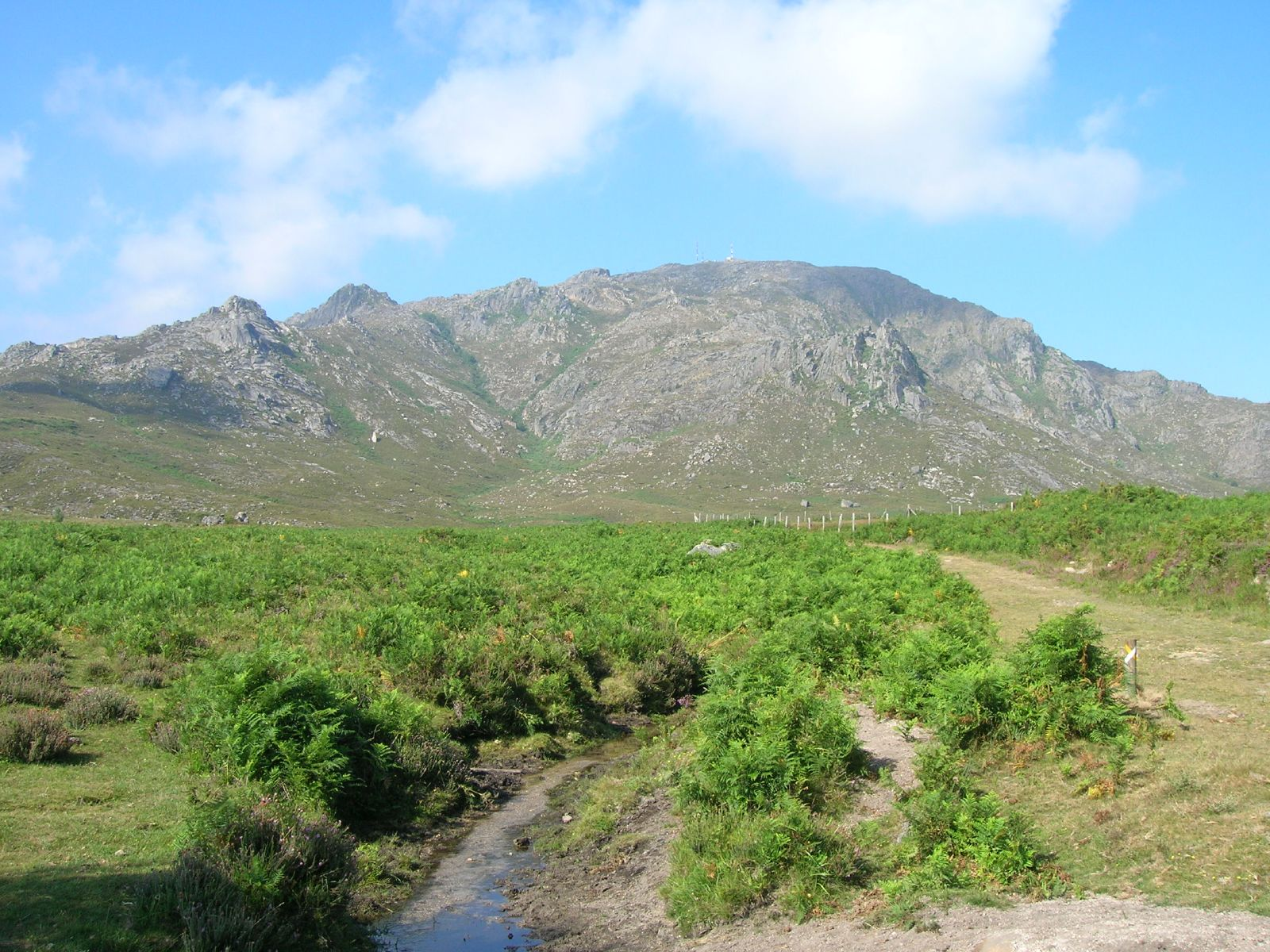
- Santa Eufemia mountain chain, seen from near Padrendo, Lobios

- Location within Galicia
- Location: Galicia, Spain
- Nearest city: Lobios
- Coordinates: 41.878°N 8.095°W
- Area: 209 km^{2} (81 mi^{2})
- Established: 1993

Baixa Limia – Serra do Xurés is a 209 km^{2} (81 mi^{2}) natural park in Galicia, Spain. It is located in the southern province of Ourense. The park was established in 1993. Serra do Xurés is the Galician name for a range of mountains which straddle the border between Spain and Portugal: the Portuguese variant is Gerês.

The main geological material of this park is granite. Within the borders of the park are lower elevation glacier cirques.

== International recognition ==
There is also a protected area on the Portuguese side of the border, the Peneda-Gerês National Park. In 2009 a transboundary biosphere reserve was designated by UNESCO which is intended to help the two countries integrate conservation measures. The Council decided to add 22 new sites to the World Network of Biosphere Reserves of UNESCO, which now has a total of 533 reserves spread over 106 countries. One that was added was the International Park Xures-Geres according to UNESCO's website.

Within the Cantabrian mixed forests ecoregion, the importance of the site is the wealth of forest ecosystems and bogs and a high level of endemic species that has been developed by climatic influences from the Atlantic Ocean and the Mediterranean. Local communities are an integral part of the regional landscape. They have established centers for sustainable development in the reserve to support municipalities in their efforts to strengthen the environmental sustainability criteria in local development.

Baixa Limia – Serra do Xurés is also the name of a Natura 2000 site.

== Flora and fauna ==
The park's flora is characterized by a deciduous forest with Pyrenean oak (Quercus pyrenaica), birch (Betula pubescens/Betula celtiberica) and Mediterranean elements such as Arbutus unedo and higher altitude holly (Ilex aquifolium). There are several relic plants, including Portuguese laurel (Prunus lusitanica), a species that colonizes the ravines and other areas that have high humidity.

Some amphibians and reptiles that can be found in the park are the Iberian wall lizards (Podarcis bocagei/Podarcis guadarramae) and the viperine snake (Natrix maura). Birds include golden eagles (Aquila chrysaetos), goshawks, cuckoos and woodpeckers. Some hunting species are wild boars, roe deer and rabbits. There are also wolves, European polecats and wildcats. Otters can be found in the waterways.

== See also ==
- Peneda-Gerês National Park
