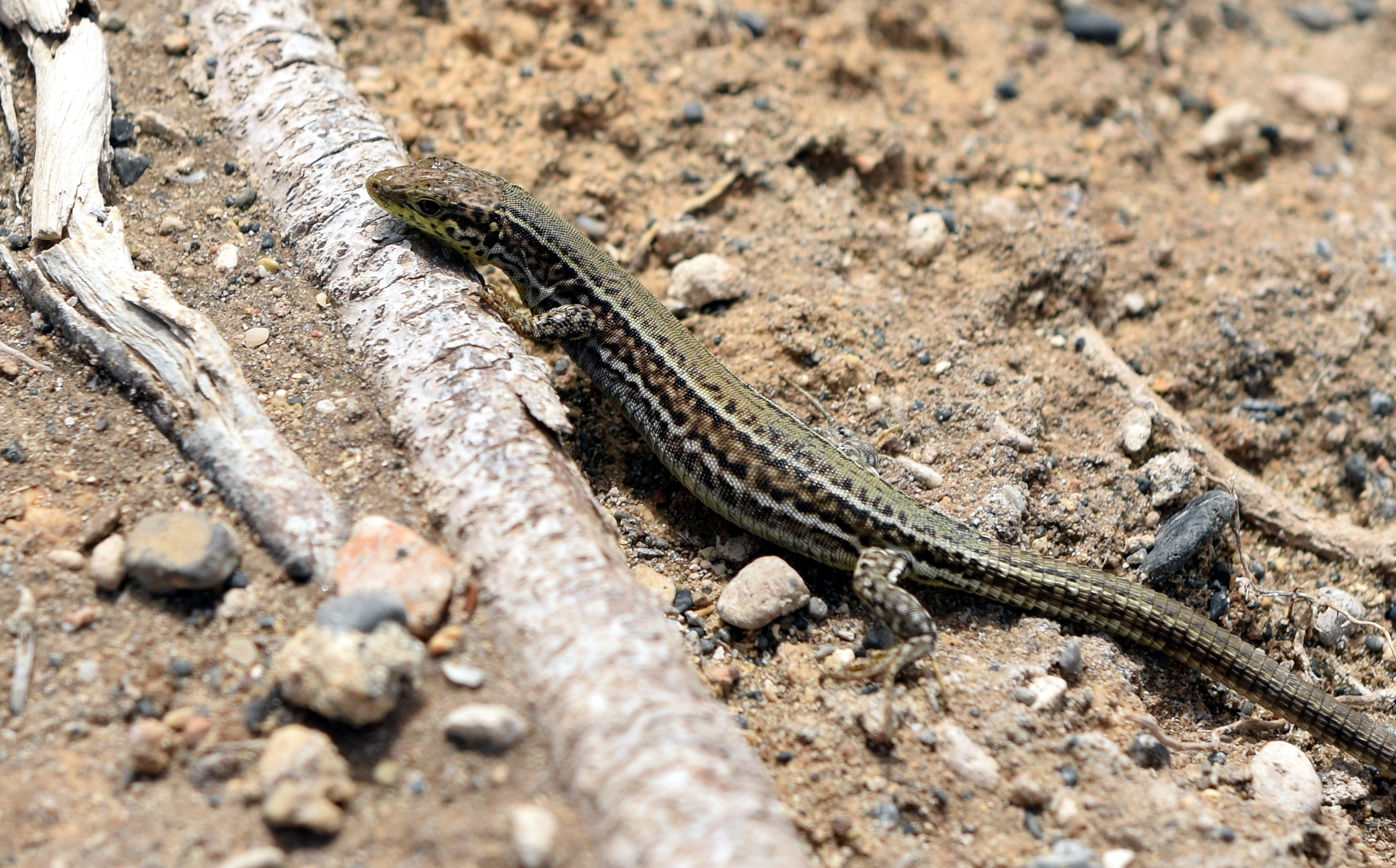
- Cretan wall lizard in Elafonisi, Crete

Conservation status
- Least Concern (IUCN 3.1)

Scientific classification
- Kingdom: Animalia
- Phylum: Chordata
- Class: Reptilia
- Order: Squamata
- Suborder: Lacertoidea
- Family: Lacertidae
- Genus: Podarcis
- Species: P. cretensis

Binomial name
- Podarcis cretensis (Wettstein, 1952)

Synonyms
- Lacerta erhardii cretensis Wettstein, 1952

= Podarcis cretensis =

Cretan wall lizard

Species of lizard

Podarcis cretensis, the Cretan wall lizard, is a species of lacertid lizard endemic to Crete (including its satellite islands).

Until 2008, these lizards were considered a subspecies of Podarcis erhardii. Genetic analysis, however, revealed that it is a separate species closely related to Podarcis peloponnesiacus.
