= Wall lizard =

Wall lizard may refer to:

- Any lizard in the family Lacertidae
  - More specifically, any lizard in the genus Podarcis
    - More specifically than that, the species Podarcis muralis
