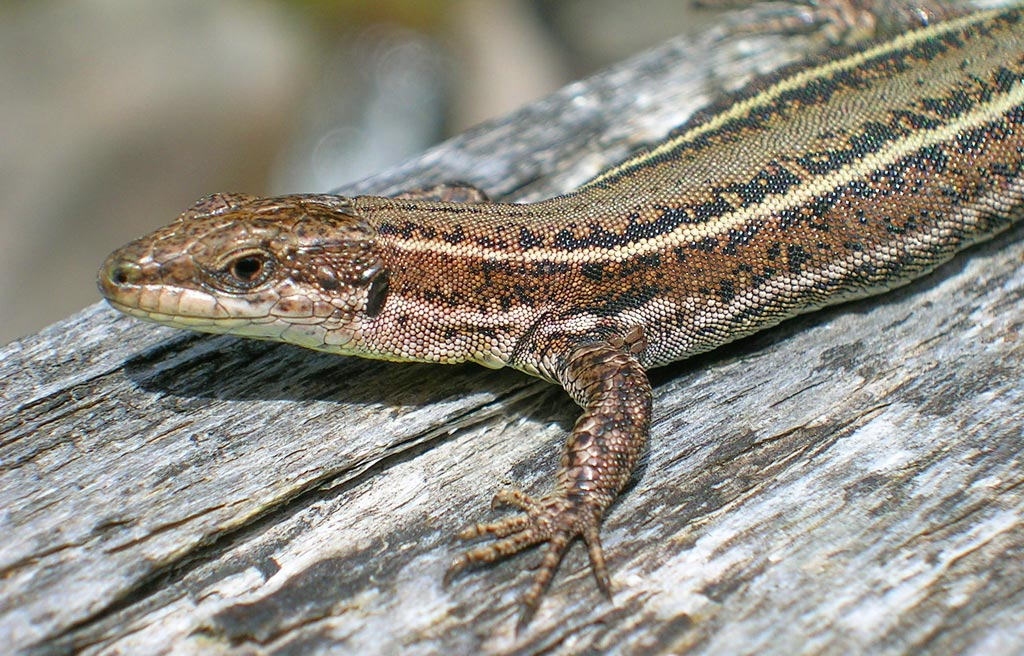

Conservation status
- Least Concern (IUCN 3.1)

Scientific classification
- Kingdom: Animalia
- Phylum: Chordata
- Class: Reptilia
- Order: Squamata
- Family: Lacertidae
- Genus: Podarcis
- Species: P. hispanicus

Binomial name
- Podarcis hispanicus Steindachner, 1870
- P. bocagei = dark green P. vaucheri = mid green P. muralis = pale green P. carbonelli = reddish-brown P. hispanicus = other colours

= Podarcis hispanicus =

Species of lizard

Podarcis hispanicus, also known as Iberian wall lizard, is a small wall lizard species of the genus Podarcis. It is found in the Iberian Peninsula, in northwestern Africa and in coastal districts in Languedoc-Roussillon in France. In Spanish, this lizard is commonly called lagartija Ibérica.

The Iberian wall lizard is very agile and can move rapidly across a rock face. Males are somewhat territorial. Females lay clutches of one to five oval eggs which hatch in about eight weeks. At birth, the juveniles have a snout-to-vent length of 2 to 2.5 cm (0.8 to 1.0 in). The lifespan of this lizard is about four years.

== History and taxonomy ==
Podarcis hispanicus was first described in Steindachner's works in 1870 and are composed of multiple distinct lineages. Most research has been done on the Spanish Levant form of Podarcis hispanicus. They are commonly found in the Baetic mountains and south of Rio Guadalquivir. The North African Podarcis hispanicus are now ranked as Padarcis vaucheri. They are all conspecifics of Podarcis liolepis.

In Portugal, there are two distinct morphotypes of P. hispanicus, type 1 resides in Northern Portugal and type 2 resides sparsely throughout and also in Southern Portugal. In Spain, type 1 P. hispanicus resides in the central and Northern region while type 2 resides south of the Iberian Central Mountain mountains.

Podarcis hispanicus are now understood as a complex with five ranks: Podarcis bocagei, Podarcis carbonelli, Podarcis hispanicus, Podarcis liolepis and Podarcis vaucheri.

Podarcis hispanicus shares many traits with Podarcis virescens.

Higher taxa for Podarcis hispanicus include family of lizards such as Lacertidae, Lacertinae, Lacertini, Sauria, Lacertoidea, and Squamata.

== Description ==
Podarcis hispanicus adults have a brown or grey-brown skin with darker spots or patterns on their back and side flanks. These lizards can have a range in size due to their varying tail sizes. It is a fairly small, slender, and somewhat flattened species with a snout-to-vent length (SVL) averaging 50–70 mm (2.0–2.8 in) and a tail twice as long as its body.

Podarcis hispanicus have limited color diversity compared to other species. These lizards can also have stripes or reticulations. Striped lizards are darker and have more black coloration than their reticulated counterparts. The background color is usually grey or brown but is occasionally greenish. Most individuals have three narrow longitudinal stripes, one along the spine and the other two more distinct, located on either side. Sometimes these are broken up into a series of streaks or marks. The throat is pale with a scattering of small spots, particularly near the sides, and the belly is usually whitish but may be pink, orange, red or buff. Young lizards may have blue tails.

The morphology of Podarcis hispanicus slightly differs depending on their environment. Lizards in cooler regions are typically heavier, larger and have darker back coloration than lizards in warmer and humid environments. The Podarcis hispanicus is an insectivorous that feeds on insects, worms and other invertebrates. Isolated cases of caudophagy has been observed in the species, where a Pordacis hispanicus was found to feed on a tail of another member of the same species. Pordacis hispanicus is a territorial lacertid lizard where males display territorial tendencies like aggression in their resident territory with sexual partners.

=== Tail coloration ===
Podarcis hispanicus tails are autotomizable. The tail can be removed without much harm towards the lizard and can be sacrificed as a last resort escape mechanism. Podarcis hispanicus may have blue or green tail coloration contrasting their darker grey or brown skin complex. Tail coloration serve to indicate subordination to other dominant conspecifics, or to seem unpalatable for other predators. These vibrant tails may also serve as decoys to divert predator's attacks from vital areas that would experience greater bodily harm. In these scenarios, the lizard will wag their tail to attract the attention of the predator. If an Iberian Wall Lizard were to be attacked, attacks on the tail would increase its escape probability because the tail can fall off. This is a commonly observed escape behavior in the species.

=== Varying coloration ===
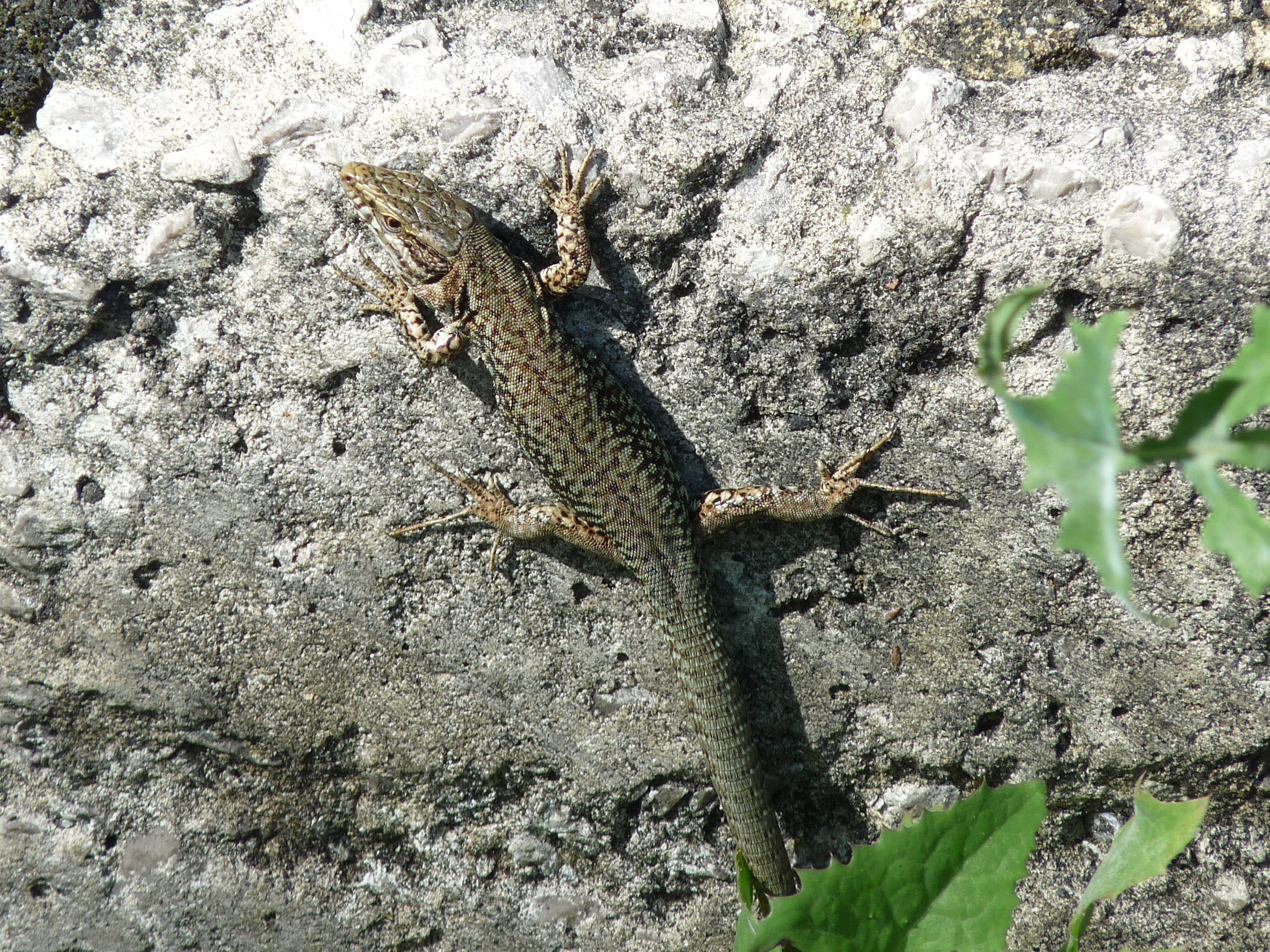
Podarcis hispanicus with brown, yellow skin coloration

During reproductive season, the lowland Podarcis hispanicus ventral coloration changes to a lighter shade. This color variation is a part of an important social communication. It is thought that the lizards resort to a lighter coloration to maximize visibility for potential mates. In non-reproductive season, the coloration trends reverse. The lowland lizards will change to a darker shade and the highland lizards will change to a brighter coloration. Similarly, during reproductive seasons, the lowland Podarcis hispanicus dorsal coloration brightens. This helps with their thermoregulation, Podarcis hispanicus in high altitudes will often revert to a darker coloration to protect them against UV-radiation. They also change their coloration to adapt to the environment or background matching. This prevents them from being easily detectable by predators. The thermoregulation mechanisms of these lizards help them to maintain ideal body temperature, allowing for better mobility.

== Distribution and habitat ==
Several different subspecies of the Iberian wall lizard are found in Spain and Portugal (where it is the only small lizard over most of the southern half of Iberia), southwestern France, Morocco, Algeria and Tunisia.

A subspecies of this lizard, Podarcis hispanicus atratus, lives in the Columbretes Islands far off the eastern coast of the Iberian Peninsula.

Studies of mitochondrial DNA have shown that there is some gene flow between these species and that they hybridise to some extent where their ranges meet.

It is a climbing lizard and is found on rocks, cliffs, walls, parapets, road cuttings and occasionally tree trunks at altitudes of up to 2,500 m (8,200 ft).

== Behavior and ecology ==
=== Intrasexual aggression ===
Male Podarcis hispanicus employ strategies during conflict to minimize the risk of injury and avoid excess energy expenditure. These strategies allow them to increase their chance of survival. Podarcis hispanicus are rarely involved in aggression towards their opposite sex counter parts. The male aggressive response is often intra-sexual and motivated by resources and potential mates. Female presence increases the chance of a male resident lizard's success in a given fight. However, if the resident male already has a female mate, another female's presence does not affect the outcome of this aggression. The female presence increases the value of the territory for the resident male, whereas it does not change the value of winning the territory for the intruder male lizard. Resident males seek submissive behavior to avoid unnecessary aggression. Foot shaking and tail twitches are some behaviors that indicates submission, which the resident male will notice and not respond aggressively.

Podarcis hispanicus are able to recognize past competitors through their memory of the competitors' physical features or chemosensory cues. Their competitor recognition agonistic behavior allows the Pordacis hispanicus to determine the outcome of their conflict more quickly and often leads to shorter aggression time on the second encounter. This agonistic behavior is advantageous for male adult Podarcis hispanicus to disengage in a conflict when they become aware of a losing outcome, or to assert dominance without expending excess energy. The reduction in aggressiveness is not exclusive to Podarcis hispanicus as they are also observed in other species like lobsters. Podarcis hispanicus can also use their sense to recognize non threatening neighbors to them.

=== True individual recognition ===
Podarcis hispanicus sociability is greatly dependent on their conspecific recognition of sex, reproducibility, social ranking and group membership. True individual recognition allows lizards to establish long-term partners and determine mating possibilities. The Podarcis hispanicus' awareness of these reproductive mechanisms allow for their special population to reach stability. Podarcis hispanicus uses scent marks even in the visual absence of the signaler to assess their contestant and determine the resident's territorial behavior. This allows for early assessment of their situation even when the other lizard is not seen, the Podarcis hispanicus can choose to ignore or engage in attack. The Podarcis hispanicus recognizes a scent mark through chemosensory. Chemosensory allows the lizard to identify intra-specific chemical cues like pheromone components which indicates a lizards sex and identity.

The scent mark allows the lizard to recognize the location of neighbors. Scent marks are useful in allowing the communication information in absence of the signaler. Lizards will still use this location information along with the frequency and location of the scent mark to evaluate the threat. A frequent scent mark of an intruder at the core of a resident's territory is perceived as a much greater threat than an infrequent scent mark, or a frequent scent mark at the borders of its territory. Depending on how great the perceived threat is, the resident lizard may choose to either not respond, approach, chase, display dominance, lunge, bite or bite and grip to incur injury. This scent mark also allow for sex discrimination during the reproductive seasons, males and females can initiate contact based on the information from their scent marks.

=== Exploratory behavior and chemosensory ===
Podarcis hispanicus are territorial species and readily explore new environments. Upon arrival to a new environment, the lizard will display tongue flicks that decline over time as it becomes habituated to the new environment. Tongue flicking is a behavior that allows the lizard to collect substrate chemicals from its surroundings and recognize scent marks. This exploratory behavior is also evident when the lizard detects other neighbors or intruders in its territory. Tongue flicking is both an exploratory and anti-predatory behavior as lizards can detect the chemical stimuli of its predators like snakes. The lizard can detect snakes because snakes will also have scent secretion that the lizard can detect through tongue flicking.

Podarcis hispanicus secretes chemicals that allow for intra-specific communication. These chemicals indicate the individual's sex and other genetic information. The chemical secretion also varies in different climate conditions. In more humid environments, Podarcis hispanicus chemical secretions are generally more volatile and have higher chemical stability. In courtship, chemosensory allows for male lizards to identify females during breeding season and identify the female's special identity. Compatibility in special identity is integral for successful copulation. Chemosensory recognition is more sensitive among males as they are greatly utilized in intra-sexual aggression. This also allows for males to recognize its known neighbors and will not engage in anti predatory behaviors. In males lizards, the chemical stimuli is released from the femoral glands. Femoral glands are generally larger and more active in males.

Sensory cues can be used for neighbor habituation. Consecutive sensory habituation allows for lizards to distinguish between a familiar neighbor and potential predators or intruders. While Podarcis hispanicus males are often territorial, if their territory has high frequency of predators they are more likely to co-habituate with other males, as long as there is enough resources available.

=== "Dear enemy" strategy ===
Territorial Podarcis hispanicus are observed to be less aggressive towards neighbors than intruders. This "dear enemy" behavior is advantageous in that it minimizes the costs of exertion for anti-predatory behaviors, and eliminates unnecessary conflicts. For Podarcis hispanicus, intra-sexual aggression is frequent during breeding seasons. Therefore, it is advantageous for males to avoid conflict whenever necessary.

== Reproduction and mating ==
Podarcis hispanicus have a polygynandrous mating system, leading to Iberian wall lizards having multiple mating partners. Male Podarcis hispanicus lizards have greater reproductive success than females because of their dominance and ability to territorial behaviors. Dominant male lizards have multiple copulating partners. Additionally, there is little courtship prior to copulation in this species. Hence, the male Podarcis hispanicus are often a lot more territorial and defensive of their resources rather than their mating partner. It is still unknown how involved the Podarcis hispanicus are to their offsprings.

In search of habitation, female lizards use their chemosensory mechanisms to identify territories with conspecific male lizards. The presence of a conspecific male indicates to female lizards that there is refuge, resource availability and lack of predation. The female will also choose territories with conspecific dominant male Podarcis hispanicus during the reproductive season for potential mating. While intersexual aggression is not often observed in Podarcis hispanicus, females may prefer smaller male lizards to avoid sexual harassment from more dominant males.

Males lizards often hold territories with multiple females. Male lizards do not prefer unfamiliar females because this requires them to go away from their territory. Male Podarcis hispanicus maximizes his reproductive success by preferentially mating with females in the same territory as him.

Similarly for an intruder male, the cost of entering another territorial male's territory to seek courtship is high and often unpreferable. An intruder Podarcis hispanicus male may still venture into a taken territory to challenge the dominant male if it is stronger and larger. In general, intruder male lizards also prefer and value a familiar female compared to an unfamiliar one. For intruders, it is most likely that the cost of competing outweighs the benefit of a single mating.

Podarcis hispanicus are oviparous.

== Conservation status ==
The Iberian wall lizard has a wide range and is common over much of that range. It is assumed to have a large total population, it is able to adapt to modifications of its habitat and it faces no particular threats. The International Union for Conservation of Nature has assessed its conservation status as being of "least concern".

== Interactions with humans ==
As Podarcis hispanicus are native to the Iberian Peninsula, Northwestern Africa and coastal districts of Languedoc-Roussillon in France, all these habitats are altering with increasing human activities. The Podarcis hispanicus exploratory behavior may be survival advantage, as the learning more about their habitat will help them with their competition and predatory strategies. Those Iberian wall lizards with tendencies to explore more will habituate faster than their corresponding environmental changes.

Lizards that have habituated to urban sites tend to spend less time hidden after predatory attacks and also have a shorter hiding period than rural lizards. Increased human exposure leads to different levels of wariness towards a potential predator. Lizards also adapt their risk assessment according to variation of environmental conditions and predatory pressures. The response to humans have been studied in a closely related species, Podarcis muralis, which showed they have become habituated to humans. This species no longer recognizes humans as predators suggesting that urbanization is changing the lizards' habitats, but these lizards are also slowly adapting to these environmental changes.

== See also ==
- Italian wall lizard, a related species
