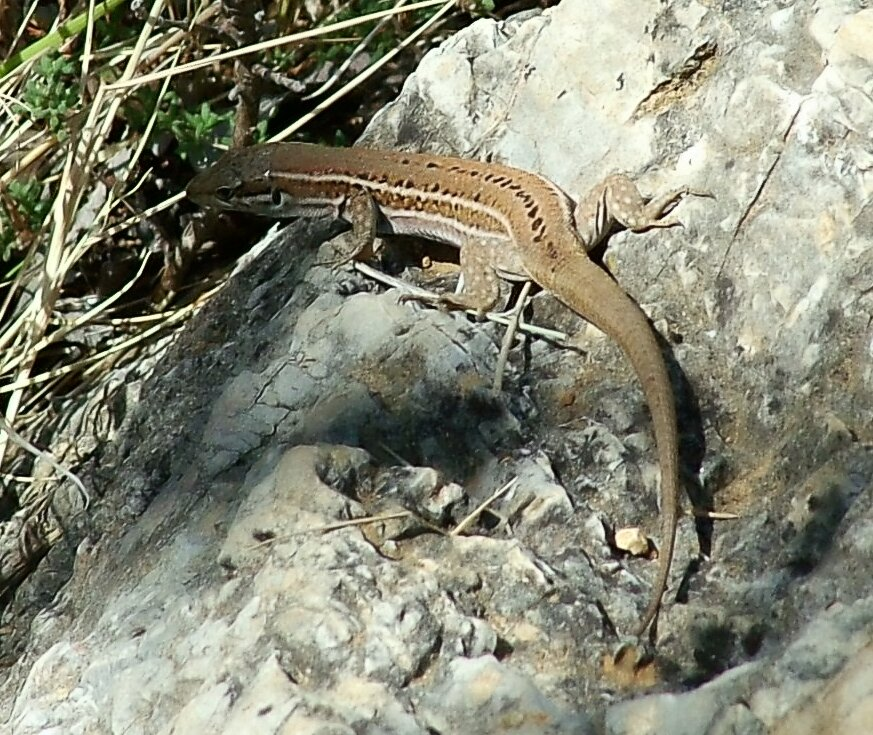

Conservation status
- Least Concern (IUCN 3.1)

Scientific classification
- Kingdom: Animalia
- Phylum: Chordata
- Class: Reptilia
- Order: Squamata
- Suborder: Lacertoidea
- Family: Lacertidae
- Genus: Podarcis
- Species: P. melisellensis

Binomial name
- Podarcis melisellensis (Braun, 1877)

= Dalmatian wall lizard =

Species of lizard

The Dalmatian wall lizard (Podarcis melisellensis) is a species of lizard in the family Lacertidae. It is found in Albania, Bosnia and Herzegovina, Croatia, Italy, Serbia, Montenegro, and Slovenia. Its natural habitats are temperate forests, Mediterranean-type shrubby vegetation, rocky areas, and pastureland.

Dalmatian wall lizards grow up to 65 mm (2.6 in) in snout–vent length. Tail is about twice as long as the body. Female lizards lay 2–8 eggs. Juveniles are about 25 mm (0.98 in) in snout–vent length upon hatching.

These lizards display three ventral color morphs: yellow, orange and white. A male that is an orange color morph is seen as a more dominant male than any other morph in intrasexual competition, since the orange color displays the lizard as more aggressive. Orange morph lizards have a larger size and bite force so they can ward off competing males in order to mate with a female of choice and claim territory In this species of lizards, the females prefer the orange males since the orange males are bigger and healthier and can give a female's offspring high quality indirect benefits. Even though females prefer to mate with orange morphs, they will still mate with yellow morphs. Yellow morph lizards give females more direct benefits like protection and small territory than indirect benefits. Meanwhile, white males are only able to mate by intruding on another male's territory and mating with other male's females.

== See also ==
- List of reptiles of Italy
