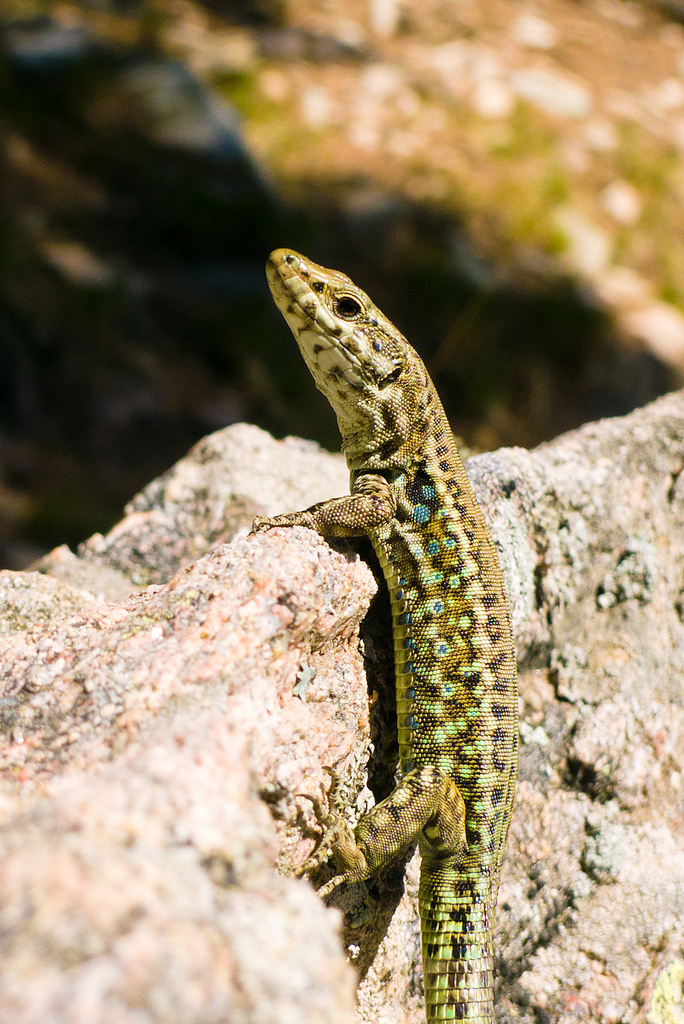

Conservation status
- Least Concern (IUCN 3.1)

Scientific classification
- Kingdom: Animalia
- Phylum: Chordata
- Class: Reptilia
- Order: Squamata
- Family: Lacertidae
- Genus: Podarcis
- Species: P. tiliguerta

Binomial name
- Podarcis tiliguerta (Gmelin, 1789)

Synonyms
- Lacerta tiliguerta Gmelin, 1789; Lacerta muralis tiliguerta — Mertens, 1932; Podarcis tiliguerta — Engelmann et al., 1993

= Tyrrhenian wall lizard =

Species of lizard

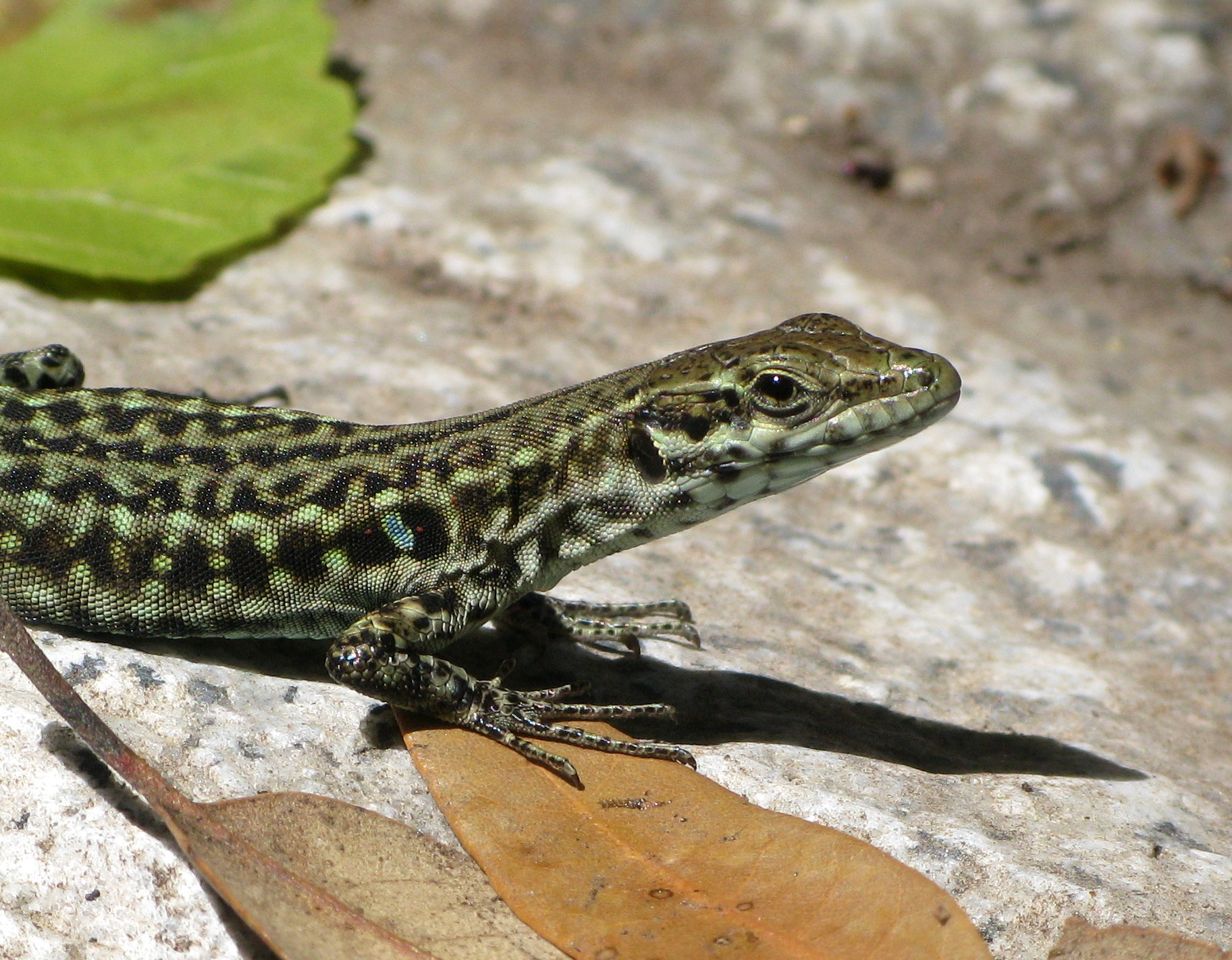
Podarcis tiliguerta, Muséum de Toulouse

The Tyrrhenian wall lizard (Podarcis tiliguerta) is a species of lizard in the family Lacertidae. The species is native to the islands Corsica and Sardinia and their associated islets. There are ten recognized subspecies.

== Habitat ==
The natural habitats of P. tiliguerta are temperate forests, temperate shrubland, Mediterranean-type shrubby vegetation, temperate grassland, rocky areas, sandy shores, arable land, pastureland, and rural gardens.

== Conservation status ==
P. tiliguerta is not considered a threatened species by the IUCN.

== Subspecies ==
Ten subspecies are recognized as being valid, including the nominotypical subspecies.

- Podarcis tiliguerta contii Lanza & Brizzi, 1977
- Podarcis tiliguerta eiselti (Lanza, 1972)
- Podarcis tiliguerta granchii Lanza & Brizzi, 1974
- Podarcis tiliguerta grandisonae (Lanza, 1972)
- Podarcis tiliguerta maresi (Lanza, 1972)
- Podarcis tiliguerta pardii Lanza & Brizzi, 1974
- Podarcis tiliguerta ranzii (Lanza, 1966)
- Podarcis tiliguerta rudolphisimonii Brizzi & Lanza, 1975
- Podarcis tiliguerta tiliguerta (Gmelin, 1789)
- Podarcis tiliguerta toro (Mertens, 1932)

Nota bene: A trinomial authority in parentheses indicates that the subspecies was originally described in a genus other than Podarcis.

== Etymology ==
The subspecific name, granchii, is in honor of Italian herpetologist Edoardo Granchi of the Museo di Storia Naturale di Firenze.
