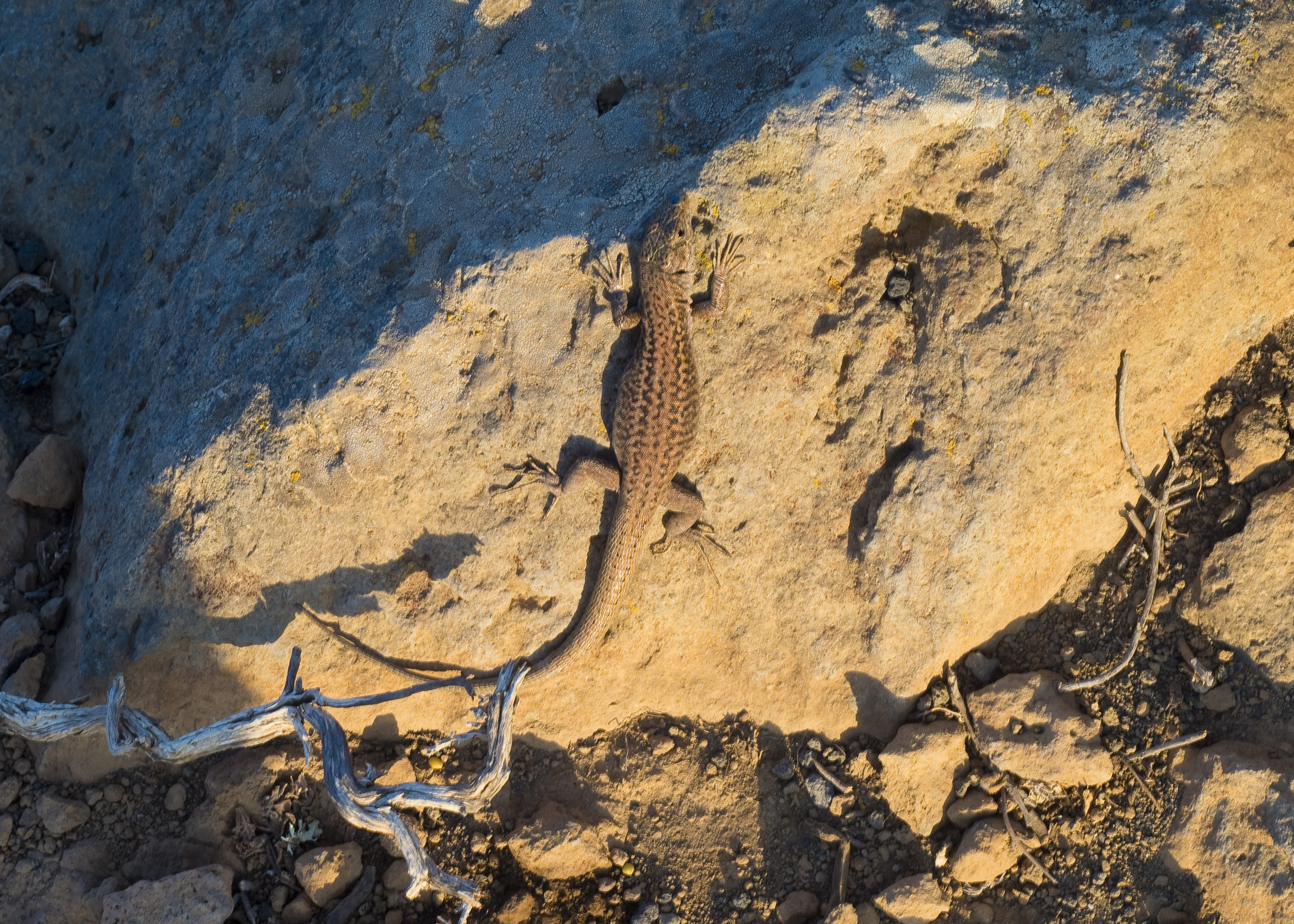
- Photographed on Santorini

Conservation status
- Least Concern (IUCN 3.1)

Scientific classification
- Kingdom: Animalia
- Phylum: Chordata
- Class: Reptilia
- Order: Squamata
- Family: Lacertidae
- Genus: Podarcis
- Species: P. erhardii

Binomial name
- Podarcis erhardii (Bedriaga, 1882)

Synonyms
- Lacerta muralis fusca var. erhardii Bedriaga, 1882; Podarcis erhardi — Engelmann et al., 1993; Podarcis erhardii — Kroniger & Zawadzki, 2005

= Erhard's wall lizard =

Species of lizard

Erhard's wall lizard (Podarcis erhardii), also commonly called the Aegean wall lizard, is a species of lizard in the family Lacertidae. The species is endemic to Southeast Europe.

== Etymology ==
The specific name, erhardii, is in honor of a certain Dr. D. Erhard (first name unknown), a German naturalist, who was the author of Fauna der Cycladen (1858).

== Geographic range ==
P. erhardii is found in the Balkan peninsula and the Aegean islands. On the mainland it ranges from Albania, North Macedonia, extreme southern Serbia and southern Bulgaria to the northeastern part of the Peloponnese peninsula in Greece. In the Aegean archipelago it does not occur in Milos or the surrounding islands, where it is replaced by the Milos wall lizard.

== Description ==
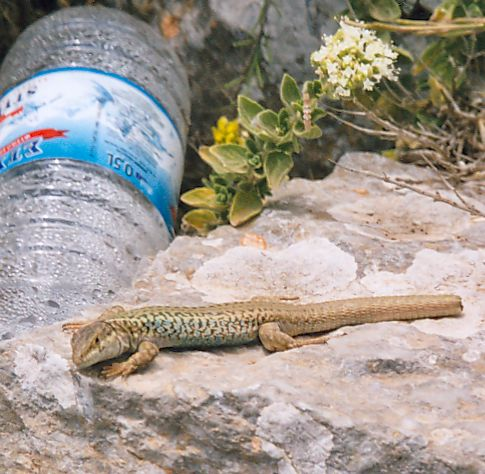
Male Erhard's wall lizard with net-like patterning

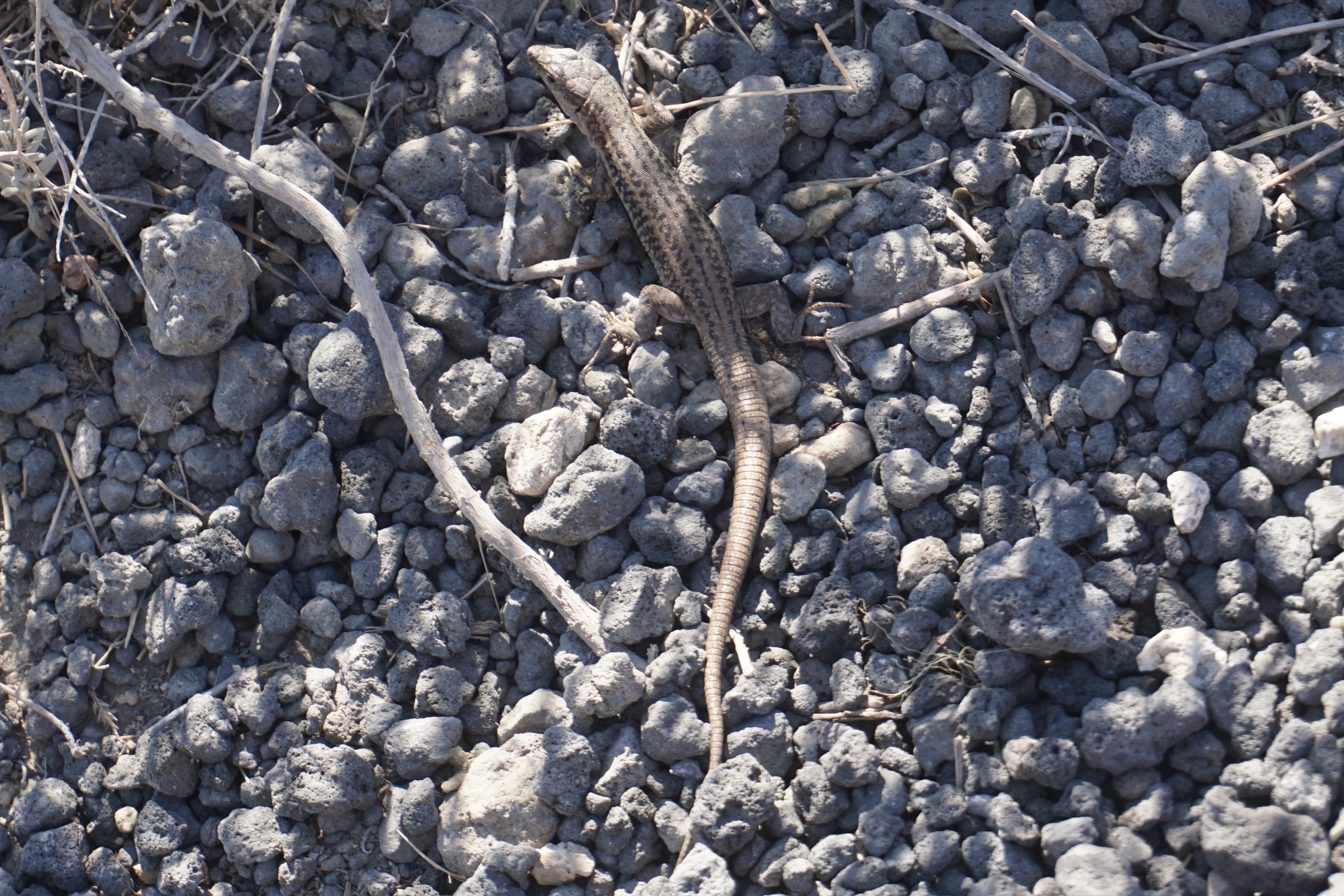
Erhard's wall lizard on Santorini

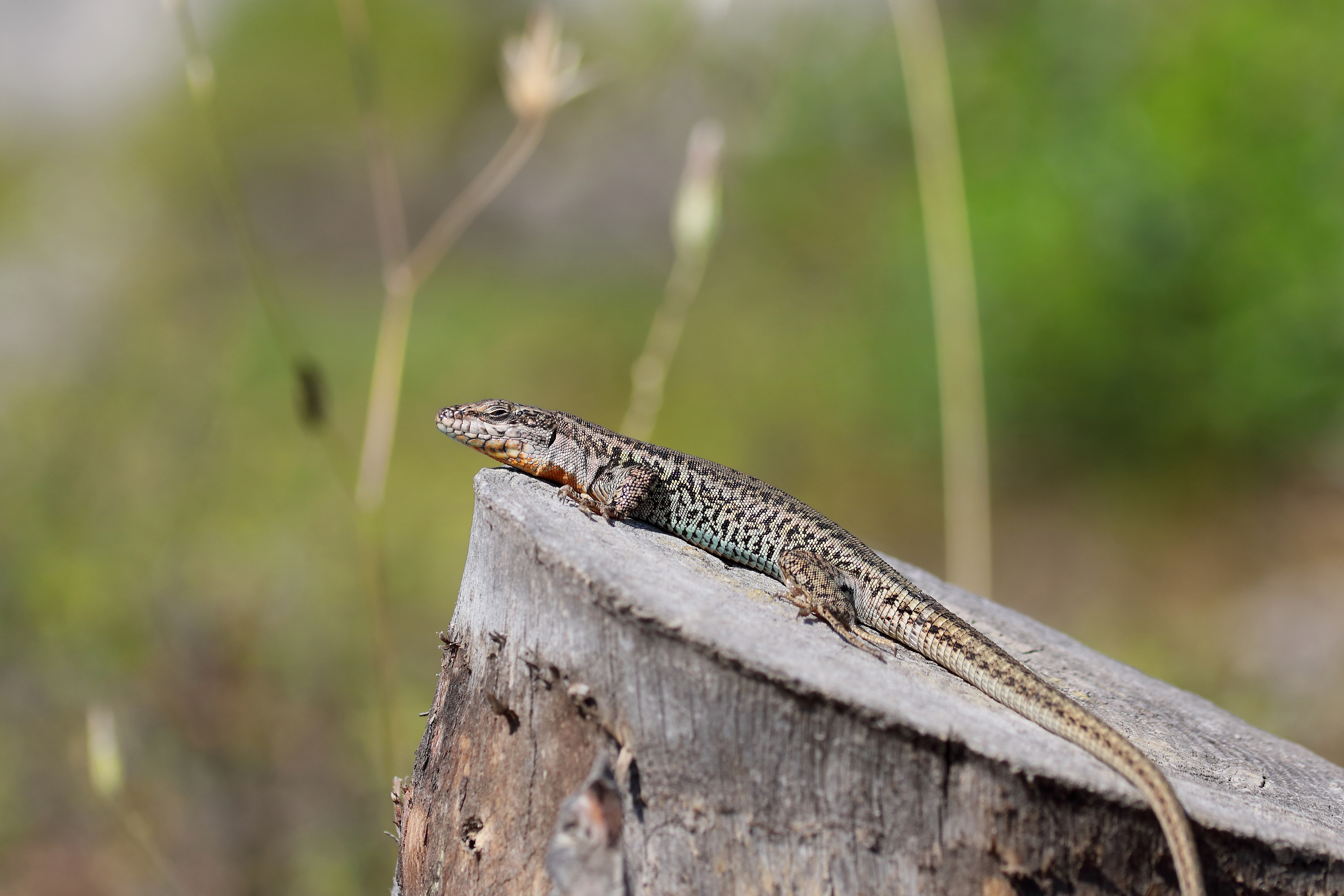
Erhard's wall lizard in Parnitha

The snout-to-vent length of P. erhardii is about 7 cm (2.8 in), and the tail is twice as long. The head is rather wide, and the skin is smooth. The colour and patterning of this species vary a lot. The main colour is typically grey or brown, sometimes green. Females particularly are often striped. On the edges of the back two white stripes border two dark stripes or spotty lines. In the middle of the back may be a dark line. Some males have net-like patterning, where longitudinal and transverse lines and spots mix. The belly and often throat are white, yellow, orange or red, and in the Aegean Islands also green, blue or grey. The belly is never spotty, but sometimes there are blue spots on the hind legs.

== Habitat ==
Erhard's wall lizard lives in dry or rocky places with dense, low bushes. It climbs very well. The lizard populations in the Aegean archipelago inhabit open places, like plant-covered dunes, as well.

== Diet ==
Erhard's wall lizard eats arthropods, especially insects.

== Reproduction ==
P. erhardii mates in spring, and lays eggs at the beginning of the summer. The young lizards hatch in September, then measuring 3 cm (1.2 in).

== Behaviour ==
P. erhardii chooses backgrounds that match its colour to enhance camouflage against avian predators in its natural habitat.

== Subspecies ==
Although 28 subspecies of P. erhardii have been described and considered valid, Sindaco & Jeremčenko (2008) consider only four subspecies to be valid, including the nominotypical subspecies.

- Podarcis erhardii erhardii (Bedriaga, 1882)
- Podarcis erhardii livadiacus (F. Werner, 1902)
- Podarcis erhardii riveti (Chabanaud, 1919)
- Podarcis erhardii thessalicus (Cyrén, 1941)
- Podarcis erhardii ruthvenii (Werner, 1930)

Nota bene: A trinomial authority in parentheses indicates that the subspecies was originally described in a genus other than Podarcis.
