= Pontian wall lizard =

Conservation status
- Near Threatened (IUCN 3.1)

Scientific classification
- Kingdom: Animalia
- Phylum: Chordata
- Class: Reptilia
- Order: Squamata
- Family: Lacertidae
- Genus: Podarcis
- Species: P. latastei

Binomial name
- Podarcis latastei (Bedriaga, 1879)

Species of lizard

Podarcis latastei, the Pontian wall lizard, is a species of lizard in the family Lacertidae. It is endemic to Italy.
