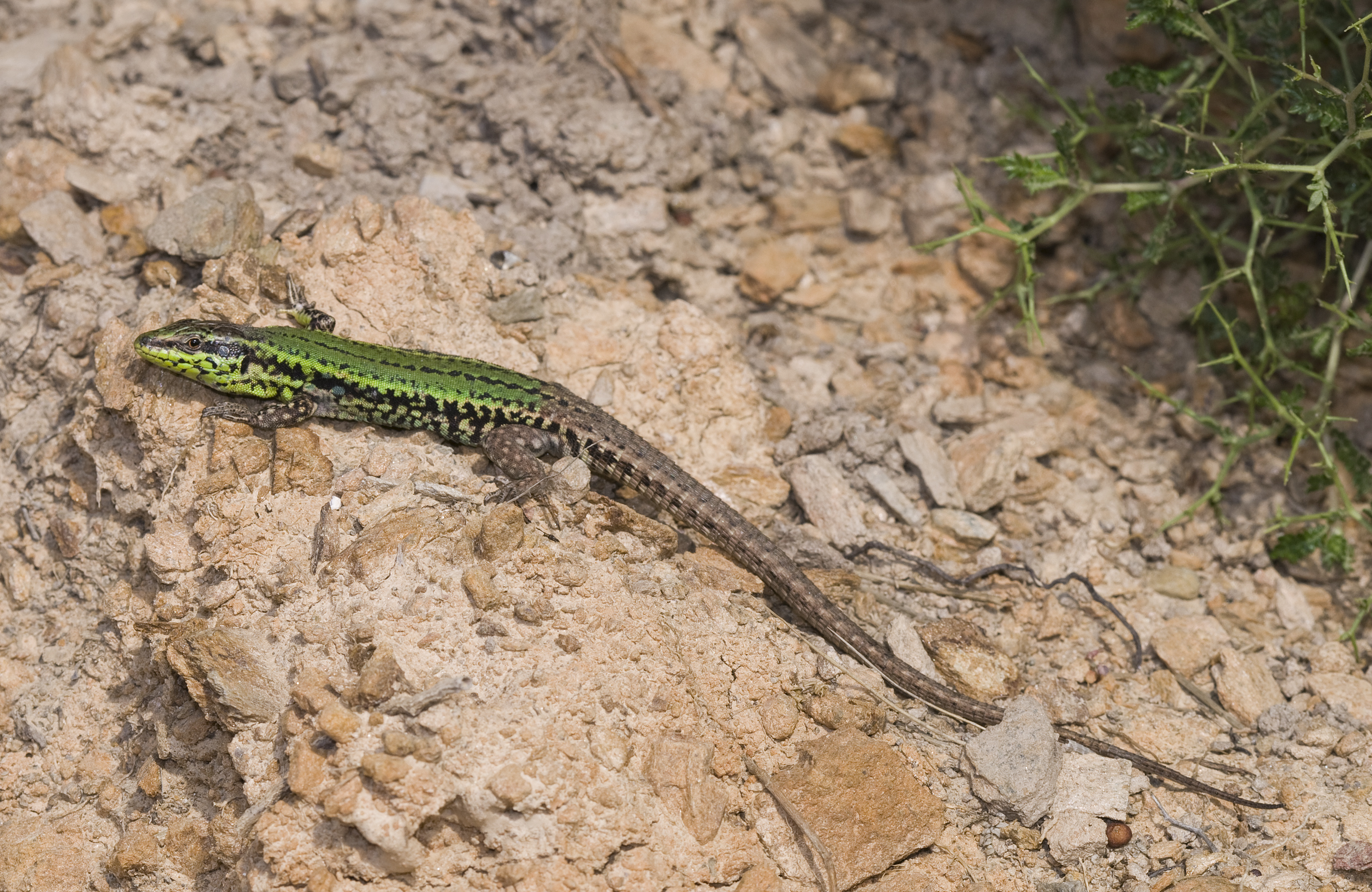

Conservation status
- Vulnerable (IUCN 3.1)

Scientific classification
- Kingdom: Animalia
- Phylum: Chordata
- Class: Reptilia
- Order: Squamata
- Family: Lacertidae
- Genus: Podarcis
- Species: P. gaigeae

Binomial name
- Podarcis gaigeae (F. Werner, 1930)

Synonyms
- Lacerta tunica gaigeae F. Werner, 1930; Podarcis taurica gaigeae — Engelmann et al., 1993; Podarcis milensis gaigeae — Tiedemann et al., 1994; Podarcis gaigeae — Cattaneo, 1999

= Skyros wall lizard =

Species of lizard

The Skyros wall lizard (Podarcis gaigeae) is a species of lizard in the family Lacertidae. The species is endemic to the islands of Skyros and Piperi in Greece.

== Subspecies ==
Two subspecies were formerly recognized. The nominotypical subspecies, Podarcis gaigeae gaigeae, is found on Skyros and associated islets, and the other subspecies, Podarcis gaigeae weigandi, is found on the island of Piperi.

== Gigantism and polymorphy ==
The Skyros wall lizard exhibits island gigantism on small islets surrounding Skyros. The Skyros wall lizard also exhibits a throat color polymorphy with six different throat color morphs that are expressed in both females and males.

== Etymology ==
The specific name, gaigeae, is in honor of American herpetologist Helen Beulah Thompson Gaige.

== Description ==
The Skyros wall lizard reaches a snout-to-vent length (SVL) of about 8.5 cm (3.3 in). It has a deep head and a tail approximately twice SVL. The colouring is rather variable, usually being green, olive-green, or brownish, with a dark vertebral band and dorso-lateral stripes. The mottled flanks often have a single blue spot above the shoulder. The underparts are white, often with dark spots on the throat, the lizards on each island having characteristic markings.

== Distribution ==
The Skyros wall lizard occurs only on Skyros and on Piperi Island in the Sporades archipelago in the northern Aegean Sea. It is the only small lizard occurring on these islands.

== Habitat ==
The natural habitats of Podarcis gaigeae are Mediterranean-type shrubby vegetation, rocky areas, and rocky shores.

== Reproduction ==
P. gaigeae is oviparous.

== Conservation status ==
The Skyros wall lizard has a total area of occupancy of less than 20 square kilometres (7.7 sq mi) but is common within that range. Although the population trend is unknown, no specific threats are apparent apart from the risks posed by wildfire. However the introduction onto its island home of some predatory species could threaten its survival so the International Union for Conservation of Nature has assessed its conservation status as being "vulnerable".
