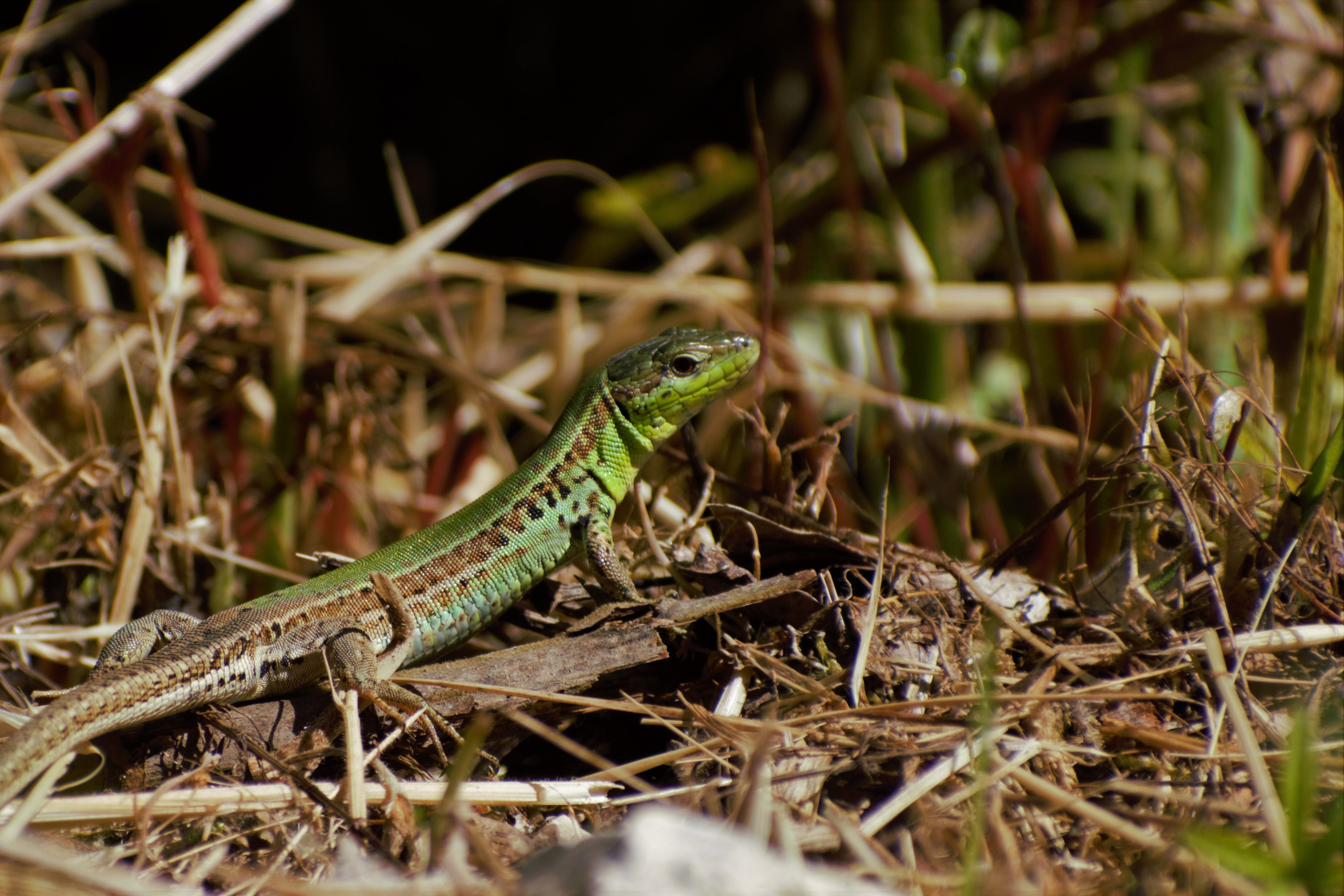
- An Ionian wall lizard near Lake Pamvotis, Greece

Conservation status
- Least Concern (IUCN 3.1)

Scientific classification
- Kingdom: Animalia
- Phylum: Chordata
- Class: Reptilia
- Order: Squamata
- Family: Lacertidae
- Genus: Podarcis
- Species: P. ionicus

Binomial name
- Podarcis ionicus (Lehrs, 1902)

= Podarcis ionicus =

Species of lizard

Podarcis ionicus, the Ionian wall lizard, is a species of lizard in the family Lacertidae. It is found in Albania and Greece.
