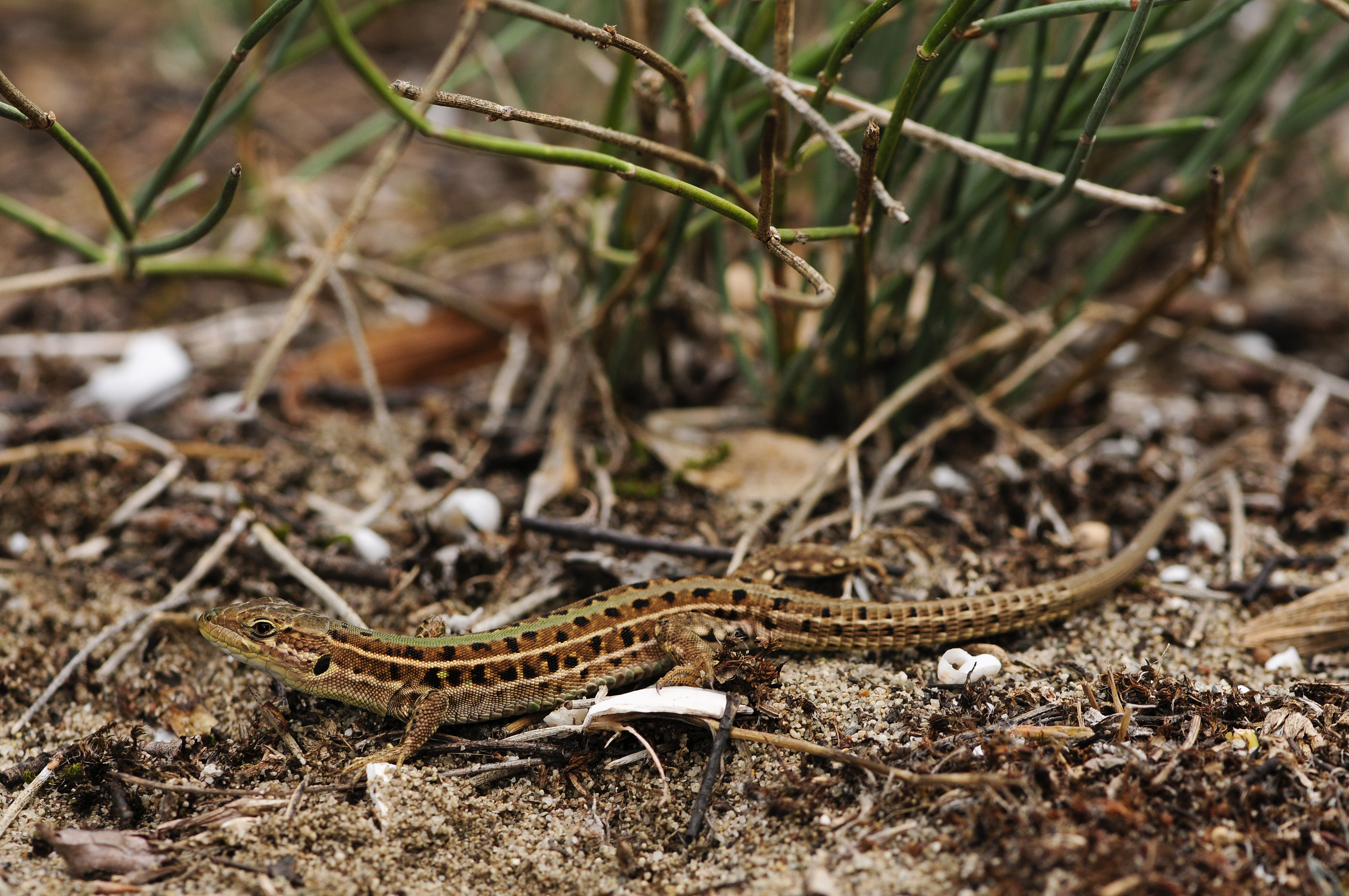

Conservation status
- Least Concern (IUCN 3.1)

Scientific classification
- Kingdom: Animalia
- Phylum: Chordata
- Class: Reptilia
- Order: Squamata
- Family: Lacertidae
- Genus: Podarcis
- Species: P. tauricus

Binomial name
- Podarcis tauricus (Pallas, 1814)

Synonyms
- Lacerta taurica Pallas 1814: 30; Podarcis taurica Engelmann et al. 1993; Podarcis tauricus Böhme & Köhler 2005

= Podarcis tauricus =

Species of lizard

Podarcis tauricus, the Balkan wall lizard, is a common lizard in the family Lacertidae native to southeastern Europe and Asia Minor. It is a terrestrial species found in steppe, grassland, olive groves, cultivated land, meadows, rural gardens, sparsely vegetated sand dunes and scrubby areas.

== Description ==
The Balkan wall lizard grows to a snout-to-vent length of about 8 cm (3.1 in) with a tail twice as long as this. It is a sturdy deep-headed lizard somewhat resembling a small green lizard. The basic colour is bright green in spring, fading to an olive-green olive-brown in summer. The markings are somewhat variable but may consist of two narrow, pale-coloured dorso-lateral stripes with the central part of the back brownish with black patches. The underparts are white and unblotched, but breeding males develop yellow, orange or red underparts and green throats.

== Distribution ==
South-west Ukraine, Crimea Peninsula, eastern and southern Romania, south-east Hungary, North Macedonia, Bulgaria, mainland Greece, the Ionian Islands, Thassos, western Turkey (Thrace and north western Anatolia), Albania and southern Moldova. south-eastern Czech Republic

== Habitat and ecology ==
Podarcis tauricus is a largely terrestrial species found in open areas of steppe, grassland, meadows, field edges, olive groves, traditionally cultivated land, rural gardens, sparsely vegetated sandy dunes and sometimes in open scrub.

Females lay two clutches, of between two and ten eggs each, in a year.

== Taxonomy ==
Two subspecies are recognised

- Podarcis tauricus tauricus
- Podarcis tauricus thasopulae

== Conservation status ==
The Balkan wall lizard is listed by the International Union for Conservation of Nature as being of "least concern". This is because it is a common species wherever there is suitable habitat within its range.
