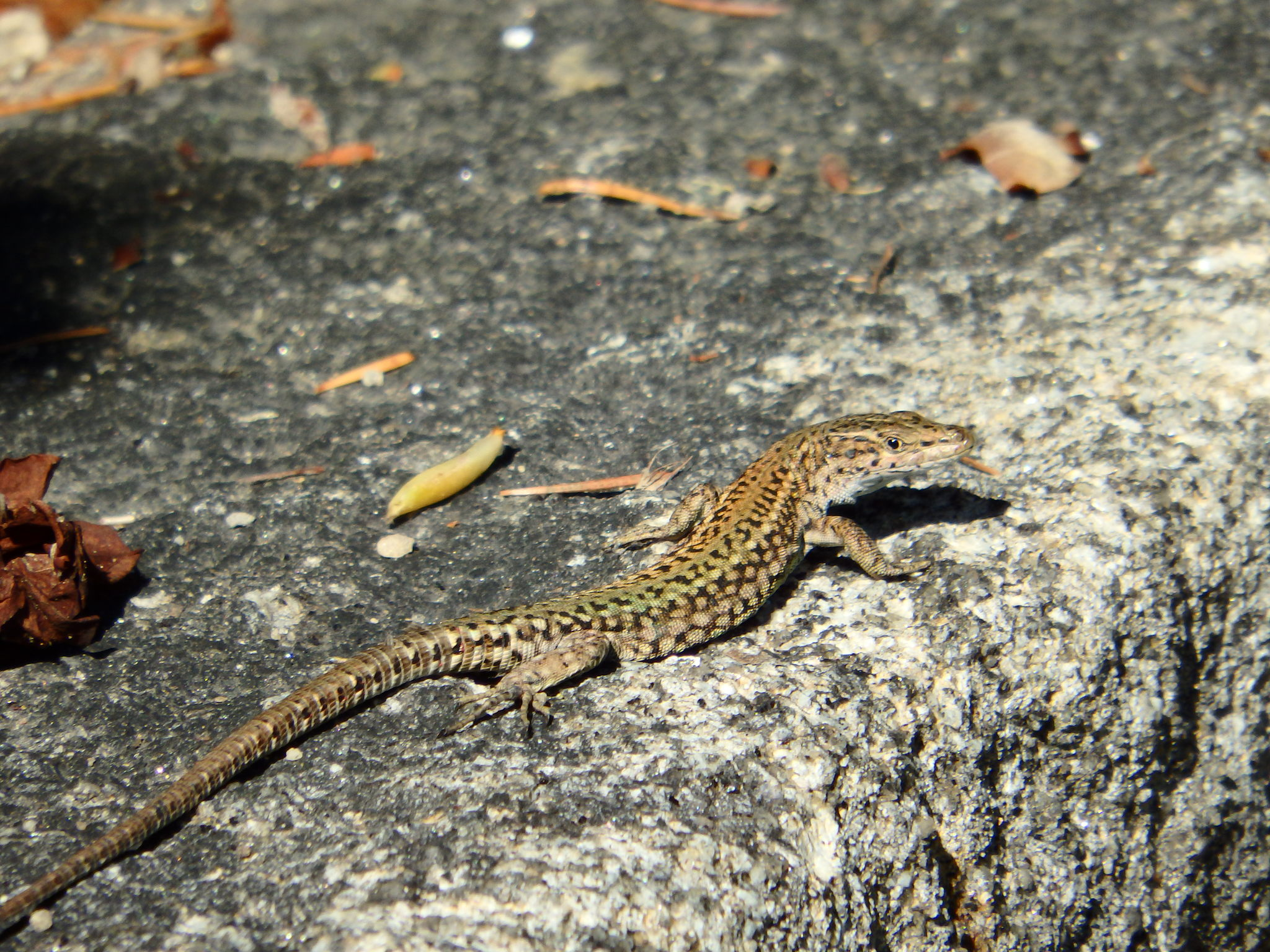

Conservation status
- Least Concern (IUCN 3.1)

Scientific classification
- Kingdom: Animalia
- Phylum: Chordata
- Class: Reptilia
- Order: Squamata
- Suborder: Lacertoidea
- Family: Lacertidae
- Genus: Podarcis
- Species: P. lusitanicus

Binomial name
- Podarcis lusitanicus (Geniez, Sa-Sousa, Guilliaume, Cluchier, & Crochet, 2014)

= Podarcis lusitanicus =

Species of lizard

Podarcis lusitanicus is a species of lizard in the family Lacertidae. It is found in Portugal and Spain.
