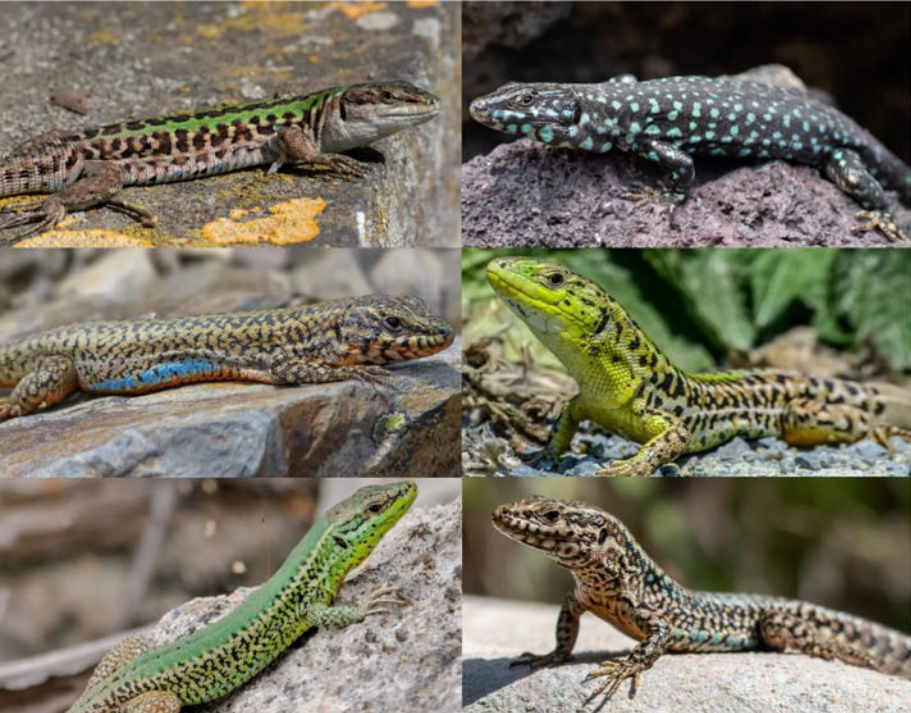
- Male phenotypes of six wall lizard species: P. siculus (top left), P. filfolensis (top right), P. erhardii (middle left), P. tauricus (middle right), P. waglerianus (bottom left) and P. muralis (bottom right).

Scientific classification
- Kingdom: Animalia
- Phylum: Chordata
- Class: Reptilia
- Order: Squamata
- Family: Lacertidae
- Genus: Podarcis; Wagler, 1830

= Podarcis =

Podarcis Temporal range: 2.58–0 Ma Pleistocene – Recent

Genus of lizards

Podarcis is a genus of lizards, known colloquially as wall lizards, in the family Lacertidae. Its members look very similar to lizards of the genus Lacerta, to which they were considered to belong until the 1970s. While similar externally and ecologically, Podarcis form a distinct group differing from Lacerta by the construction of the skull and the hemipenis, and by the processes of the caudal vertebrae. Wall lizards are native to Europe and northern Africa, and most species are restricted to the Mediterranean region. Wall lizards diversified and hybridized during the Messinian salinity crisis. The Italian wall lizard and the common wall lizard have been introduced to North America, where they have become intermediate hosts for some Acuariidae larvae.

== Species and subspecies ==
The genus Podarcis contains the following 27 species which are recognized as being valid. A few of the many recognized subspecies are also listed here.

- Bocage's wall lizard, Podarcis bocagei (Seoane, 1885)
- Carbonell's wall lizard, Podarcis carbonelli Pérez Mellado, 1981
- Cretan wall lizard, Podarcis cretensis (Wettstein, 1952)
- Erhard's wall lizard, Podarcis erhardii (Bedriaga, 1882)
- Maltese wall lizard, Podarcis filfolensis (Bedriaga, 1876)
- Skyros wall lizard, Podarcis gaigeae (F. Werner, 1930)
- Podarcis galerai Bassitta, Buades, Pérez‐Cembranos, Pérez‐Mellado, Terrasa, Brown, Navarro, Lluch, Ortega, Castro, Picornell, & Ramon, 2020
- Podarcis guadarramae (Boscá, 1916)
- Iberian wall lizard, Podarcis hispanicus (Steindachner, 1870)
- Crimean wall lizard, Podarcis ionicus (Lehrs, 1902)
- Pontian wall lizard, Podarcis latastei (Bedriaga, 1879)
- Podarcis levendis Lymberakis, Poulakakis, Kaliontzopoulou, Valakos & Mylonas, 2008
- Lilford's wall lizard, Podarcis lilfordi (Günther, 1874)
  - Ratas Island lizard, Podarcis lilfordi rodriquezi (L. Müller, 1927), extinct, 1950
- Catalan wall lizard, Podarcis liolepis (Boulenger, 1905)
- Podarcis lusitanicus (Geniez, Sa-Sousa, Guilliaume, Cluchier, & Crochet, 2014)
- Dalmatian wall lizard, Podarcis melisellensis (Braun, 1877)
- Milos wall lizard, Podarcis milensis (Bedriaga, 1882)
- Common or European wall lizard, Podarcis muralis (Laurenti, 1768)
- Peloponnese wall lizard, Podarcis peloponnesiacus (Bibron & Bory de Saint-Vincent, 1833)
- Ibiza wall lizard, Podarcis pityusensis (Boscá, 1883)
- Aeolian wall lizard, Podarcis raffonei (Mertens, 1952)
- Italian wall lizard, Podarcis siculus (Rafinesque, 1810)
  - Santo Stefano lizard, Podarcis siculus sanctistephani (Mertens, 1926), extinct, 1965
- Balkan wall lizard, Podarcis tauricus (Pallas, 1814)
- Tyrrhenian wall lizard, Podarcis tiliguerta (Gmelin, 1789)
- Andalusian wall lizard, Podarcis vaucheri (Boulenger, 1905)
- Podarcis virescens Geniez, Sá-Sousa, Guillaume, Cluchier & Crochet, 2014
- Sicilian wall lizard, Podarcis waglerianus (Gistel, 1868)

Nota bene: A binomial authority or trinomial authority in parentheses indicates that the species or subspecies was originally described in a genus other than Podarcis.
