= Podarcis galerai =

Scientific classification
- Kingdom: Animalia
- Phylum: Chordata
- Class: Reptilia
- Order: Squamata
- Family: Lacertidae
- Genus: Podarcis
- Species: P. galerai

Binomial name
- Podarcis galerai Bassitta, Buades, Pérez‐Cembranos, Pérez‐Mellado, Terrasa, Brown, Navarro, Lluch, Ortega, Castro, Picornell, & Ramon, 2020

Species of lizard

Podarcis galerai is a species of lizard in the family Lacertidae. It is found in Spain.
