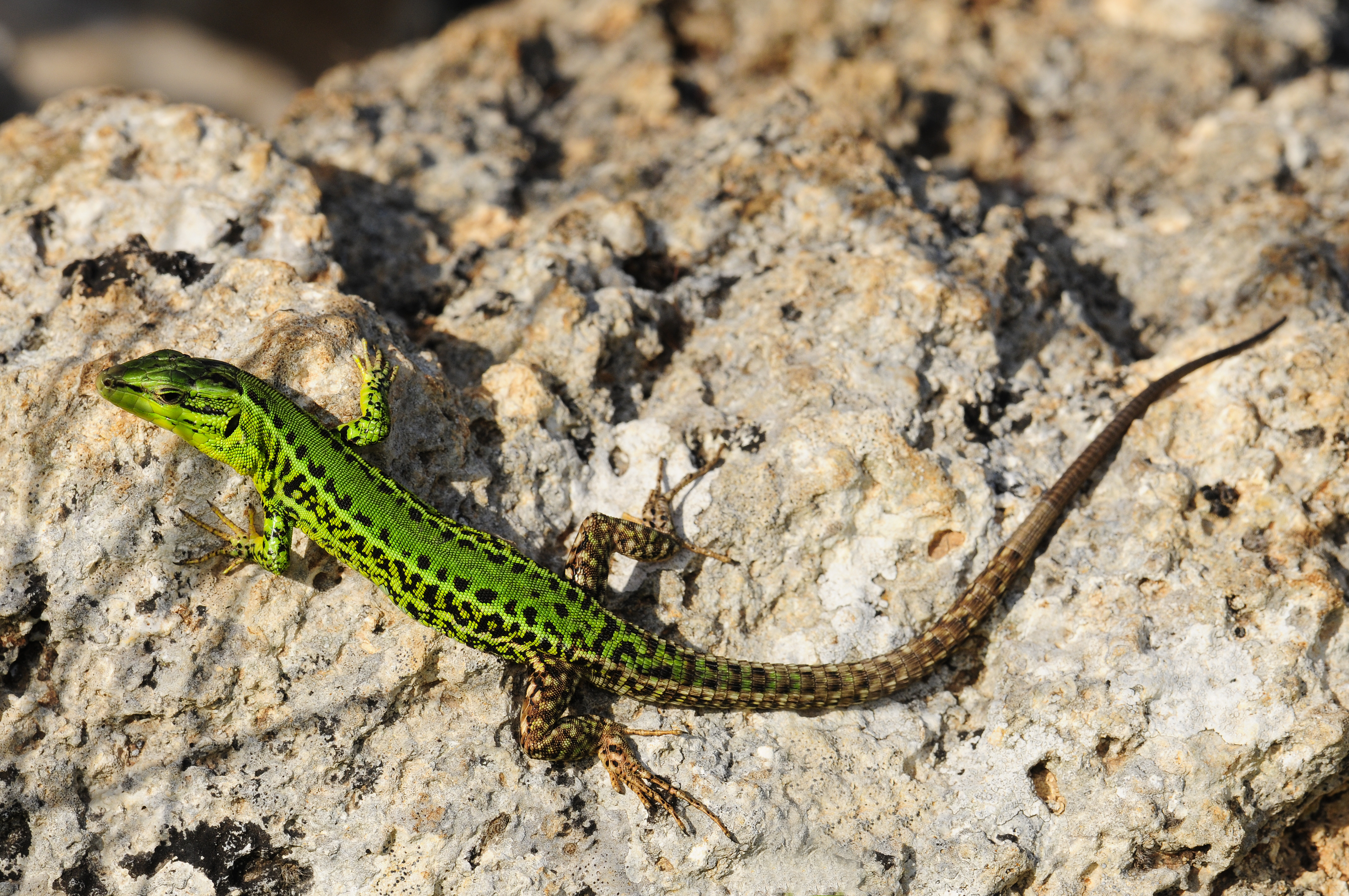

Conservation status
- Least Concern (IUCN 3.1)

Scientific classification
- Kingdom: Animalia
- Phylum: Chordata
- Class: Reptilia
- Order: Squamata
- Family: Lacertidae
- Genus: Podarcis
- Species: P. waglerianus

Binomial name
- Podarcis waglerianus Gistel, 1868

Synonyms
- Podarcis wagleriana Gistel, 1868; Lacerta wagleriana — Taddei, 1949; Podarcis wagleriana — Engelmann et al., 1993; Podarcis waglerianus — Böhme & J. Köhler, 2005

= Sicilian wall lizard =

Species of lizard

The Sicilian wall lizard (Podarcis waglerianus) is a species of lizard in the family Lacertidae. Endemic to Italy, it occurs in Sicily and the Aegadian Islands. Its natural habitats are temperate forests, temperate shrubland, Mediterranean-type shrubby vegetation, temperate grassland, arable land, pastureland, and rural gardens. The IUCN does not consider it to be a threatened species. Three subspecies are recognized: P. w. antoninoi, P. w. marettimensis, and P. w. waglerianus.

== Etymology ==
The specific name, waglerianus, is in honor of German herpetologist Johann Georg Wagler.

== Description ==
The Sicilian wall lizard grows to a length around 7.5 cm (3 in), with males being slightly larger than females. The dorsal surface is usually green, but some females may be olive or brownish. Usually, it has a well-defined white or yellow dorsolateral stripe and often a brown stripe, or series of dots, running along the spine. Other dark spots occur in rows on the back and flanks of males, but females are often a more uniform colour. The underparts are white, with a spotted throat, but may be suffused with orange, pink, or red in breeding males. The Sicilian wall lizard differs from island populations of the Italian wall lizard in having a deeper head, more slender form, more speckled (rather than reticulated) markings, and the brighter colour of the underparts.

== Distribution and habitat ==
The species is endemic to Sicily and the Aegadian Islands. It frequents areas with lush vegetation on the edges of woodland, bushy slopes, pasture, and cultivated land. It is often present in gardens, especially irrigated ones. In contrast to the Italian wall lizard, it does not climb much and occupies more densely vegetated areas. It is the more common wall lizard inland, while the Italian wall lizard is the more common near the coast.

== Biology ==
The female lays a clutch of four to six oval eggs, usually concealed at the base of a plant. They hatch after about 8 weeks, and the newly hatched juveniles are about 5.5 cm (2.2 in) long.

== Status ==
P. waglerianus is widespread in Sicily, is tolerant of a range of habitats, and is assumed to have a large total population. Its populations are in general stable, though it may be declining in number on some islands. The International Union for Conservation of Nature has assessed it as being of "least concern".

== See also ==
- List of reptiles of Italy
