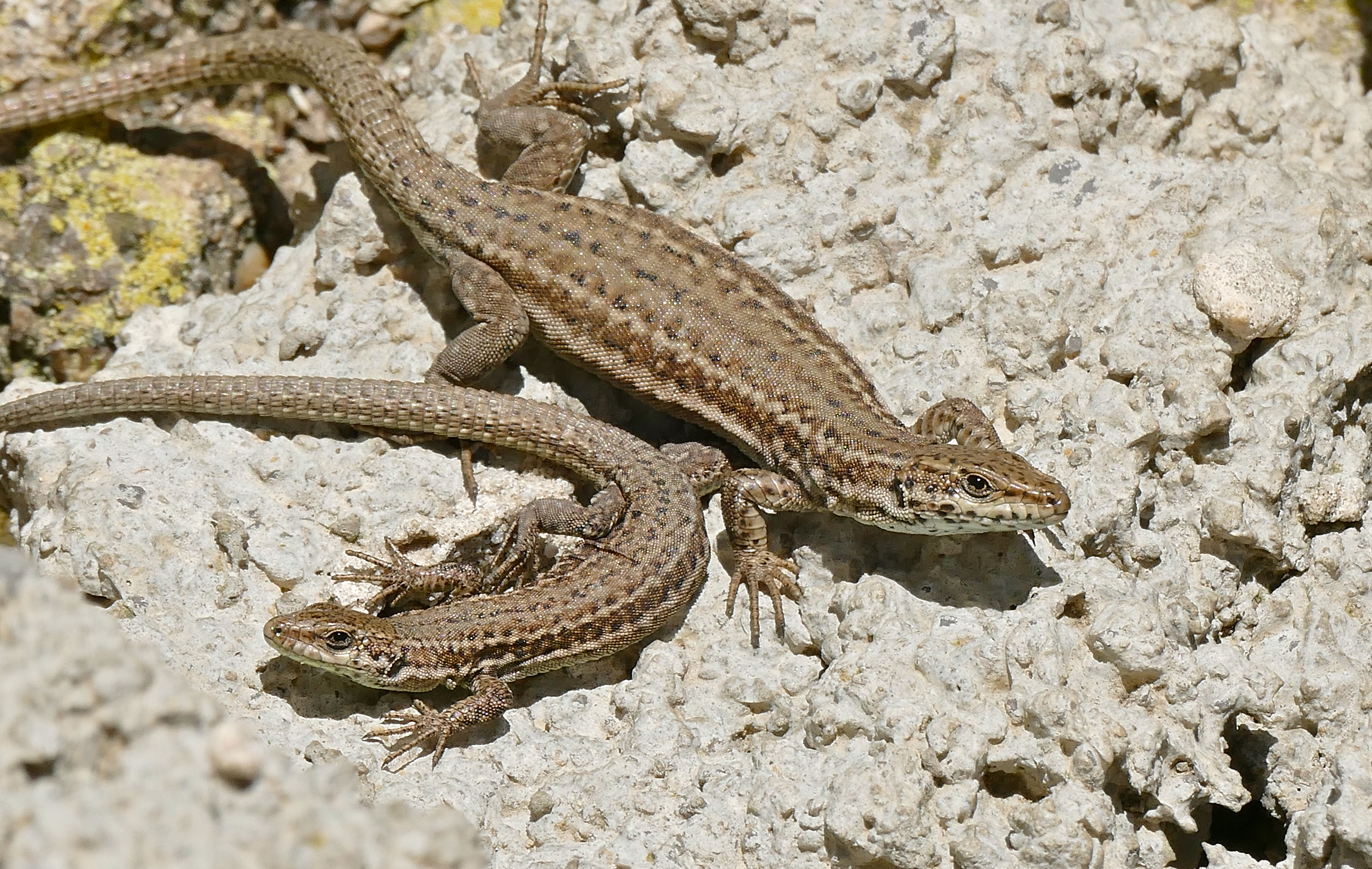

Scientific classification
- Domain: Eukaryota
- Kingdom: Animalia
- Phylum: Chordata
- Class: Reptilia
- Order: Squamata
- Family: Lacertidae
- Genus: Podarcis
- Species: P. liolepis

Binomial name
- Podarcis liolepis (Boulenger, 1905)

Synonyms
- Lacerta muralis var. liolepis, Boulenger 1905; Podarcis hispanica atrata, Boscá 1916; Lacerta atrata columbretensis, Eisentraut 1930; Lacerta atrata mancolibrensis, Eisentraut 1930; Podarcis hispanica atrata, Bauer & Günther 1995, Pérez-Mellado 1998; Podarcis atrata, Castilla et al. 1998, Oliviero et al. 2000, Arnold et al. 2007; Podarcis atratus, Sindaco & Jeremčenko 2008; Podarcis liolepis, Renoult et al. 2010

= Podarcis liolepis =

Species of lizard

Podarcis liolepis, the Columbretes wall lizard or Catalan wall lizard, is very similar to the other lizards in the genus Podarcis. This species was formerly described as a subspecies of the Iberian wall lizard, but has now been elevated to species status. These are slender lizards with long tails, narrow tapered heads and long thin toes, and stout legs. Colours are variable, although generally grey-brown. Often very subtle spots and stripes along the back and flanks can be seen and these can be more distinguished in the female. The underside is a much lighter cream or beige with sometimes a reddish tint. Adults grow 15–20 cm in length from the nose to tip of the tail. Body length can be a little as one third of the total body length, the tail making up the other two thirds.

== Life cycle ==
Lifespan around 4–5 years. Sexual maturity is reached in their second year. Breeding takes place in spring after they wake from winter hibernation. 1-5 eggs are laid, each around 5x9mm, in cracks in rocks or under stones. During development the eggs swell and after 8 weeks when ready to hatch they can be 8x15mm in size. They hatch out around early July.

== Distribution ==
They are found in the north-east of the Iberian peninsula, including southern France in parts of the Pyrenees. They are not found above 3400m elevation.
