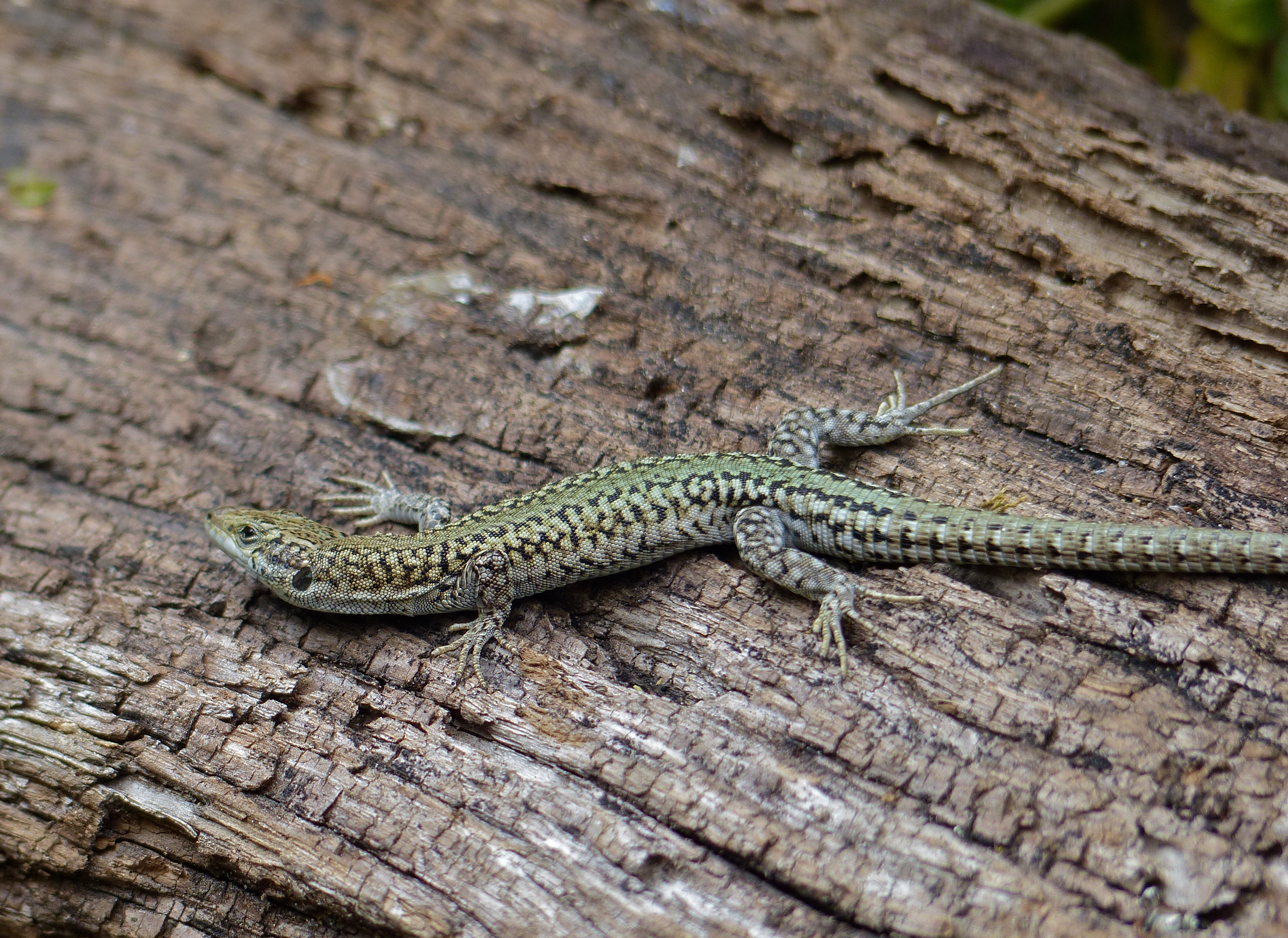

Scientific classification
- Domain: Eukaryota
- Kingdom: Animalia
- Phylum: Chordata
- Class: Reptilia
- Order: Squamata
- Family: Lacertidae
- Genus: Podarcis
- Species: P. guadarramae

Binomial name
- Podarcis guadarramae (Boscá, 1916)

= Podarcis guadarramae =

Species of lizard

Podarcis guadarramae is a species of lizard in the family Lacertidae. It is found in Spain and Portugal.
