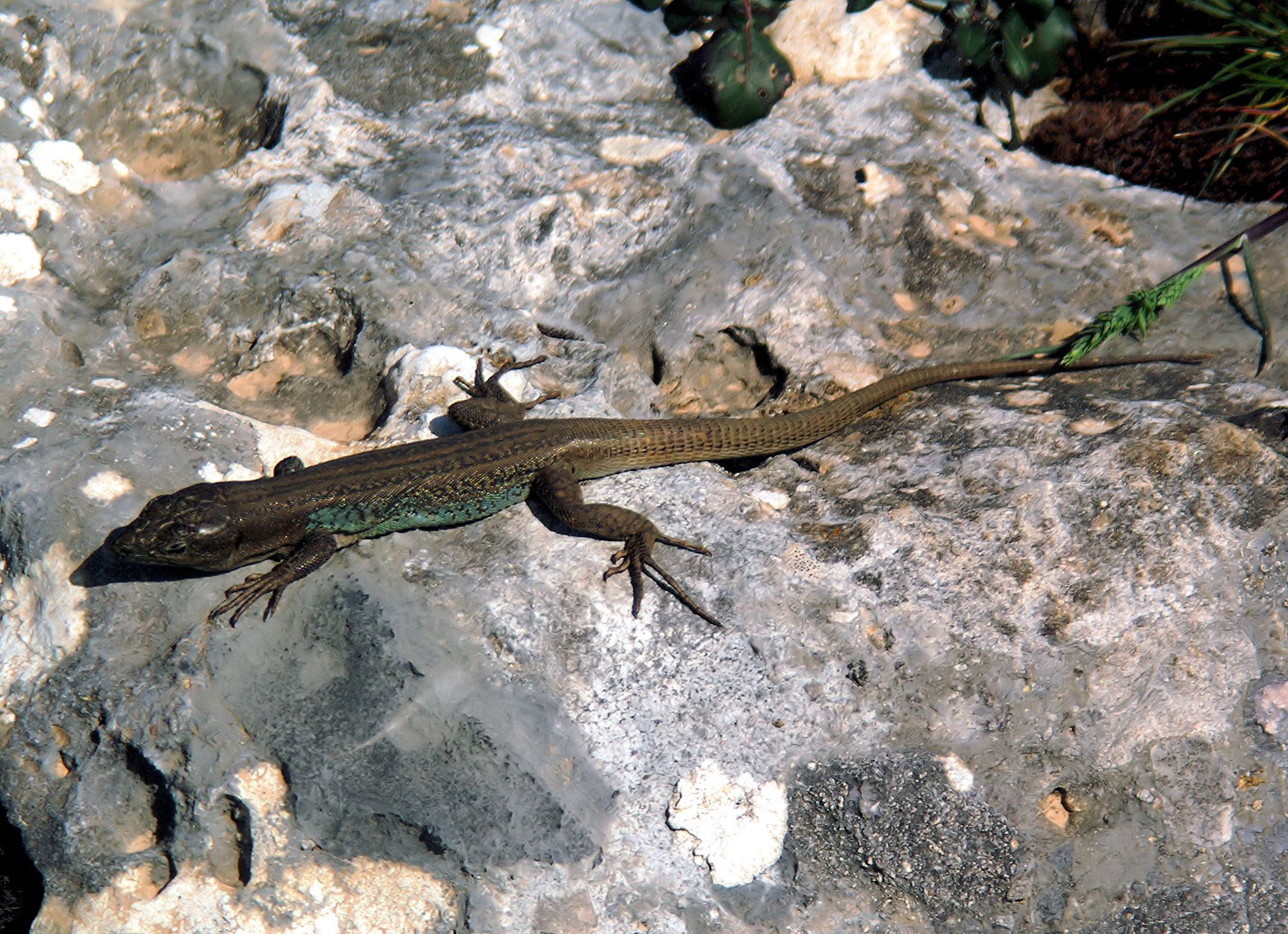

Conservation status
- Least Concern (IUCN 3.1)

Scientific classification
- Kingdom: Animalia
- Phylum: Chordata
- Class: Reptilia
- Order: Squamata
- Family: Lacertidae
- Genus: Podarcis
- Species: P. peloponnesiacus

Binomial name
- Podarcis peloponnesiacus (Bibron & Bory, 1833)

Synonyms
- Podarcis peloponnesiacus (Bibron and Bory, 1833)

= Peloponnese wall lizard =

Species of lizard

The Peloponnese wall lizard (Podarcis peloponnesiacus) is a species of lizard in the family Lacertidae. It is endemic to the Peloponnese region of southern Greece. Its natural habitats are Mediterranean-type shrubby vegetation, rocky areas, arable land, pastureland, plantations, and rural gardens.

== Description ==
The Peloponnese wall lizard grows to a snout-to-vent length of about 8.5 cm (3.3 in) with a tail about twice the length of the body. Males are in general rather larger than females. It is a robust species with adult males having particularly large heads. The colouring is rather variable, basically being some shade of olive- or greyish-brown with a pale vertebral stripe and more clearly defined dorso-lateral pale stripes. The mottled flanks often have one or more blue spots above the shoulder and the blue colour may extend along the flanks in males. The underparts are red, orange or white and unspotted. Juveniles often have blue tails.

== Behaviour ==
The Peloponnese wall lizard largely replaces the Greek rock lizard in the Peloponnese region. It is an agile species and climbs on rocks, walls and tree trunks. It often perches in an elevated position and can make long jumps between rocks. It often forages on the ground. The males are territorial during the breeding season and are very aggressive at this time. Females usually lay two clutches of up to six eggs, in crevices or concealed places, and the eggs take about six weeks to hatch, the newly hatched juveniles being about 3.5 cm (1.4 in) long.

== Status ==
The Peloponnese wall lizard has a total area of occupancy of less than 2,000 square kilometres (770 sq mi) but it is common in suitable habitat within its range. The population is steady and faces no significant threats (apart from wildfires) and the International Union for Conservation of Nature has assessed its conservation status as being of "least concern".
