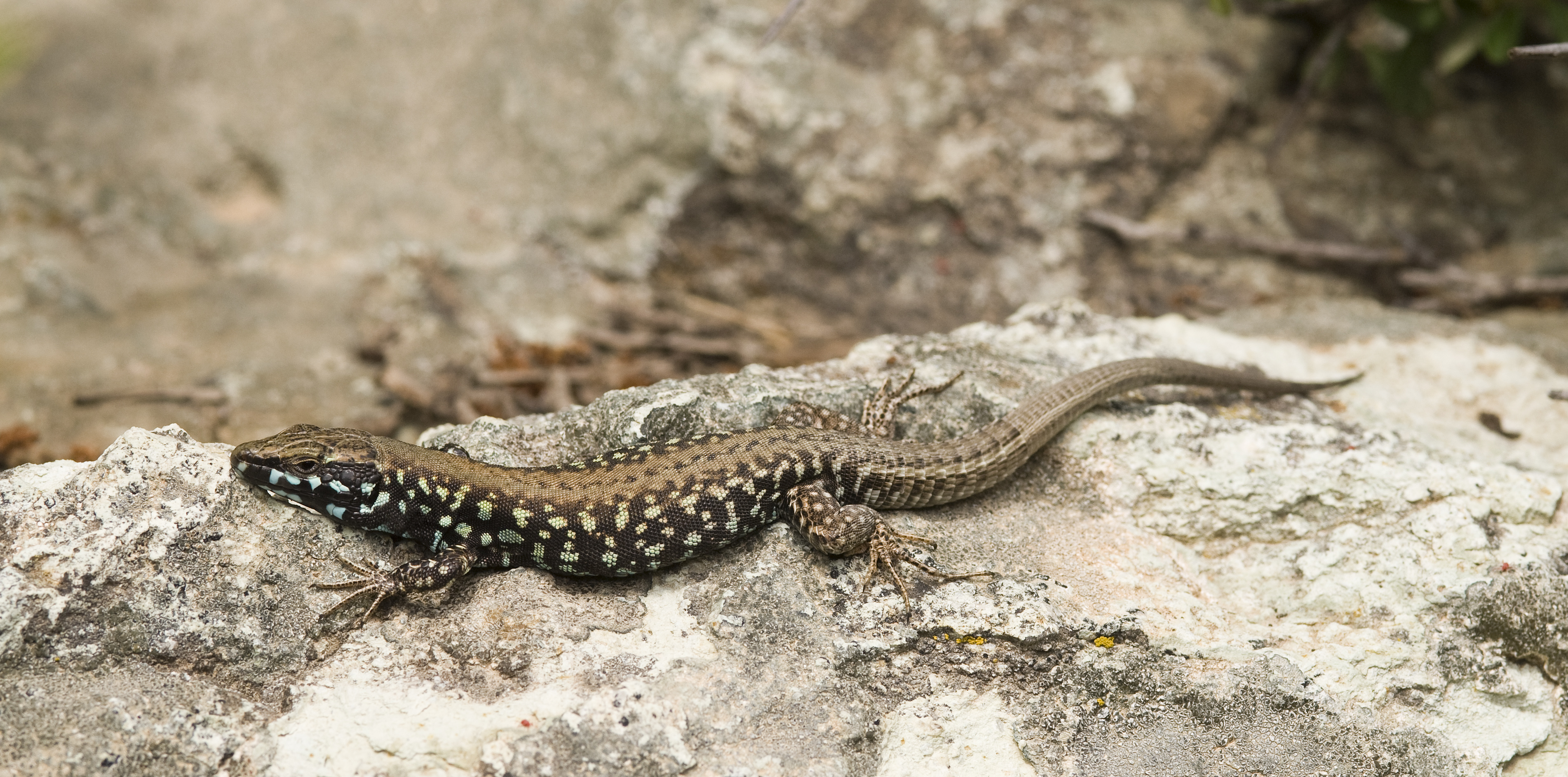

Conservation status
- Vulnerable (IUCN 3.1)

Scientific classification
- Kingdom: Animalia
- Phylum: Chordata
- Class: Reptilia
- Order: Squamata
- Family: Lacertidae
- Genus: Podarcis
- Species: P. milensis

Binomial name
- Podarcis milensis Bedriaga, 1882

= Milos wall lizard =

Species of lizard

The Milos wall lizard (Podarcis milensis) is a small Mediterranean lizard.

The lizard's body length is no more than 6.5 cm, and the tail is twice as long. The lizard looks sturdy, and has a broad head. The male's appearance is characteristic of the species. The back is usually brown, and has a slight longitudinal line in the middle of it. Flanks, throat and the sides of the head are black with white, yellow, blue or light green spots. The belly has often black patterning. A typical female has white stripes on the edges of its back, and some distinctive spots in the throat.

The Milos wall lizard inhabits a few Aegean islands in Greece. They are Milos, Kimolos, Falkonera, Antimilos and Parapola. The species prefers cultivated lands. These lizards bask in the sun in the banks and piles of stones. They hunt in the open ground or among plants.

Subspecies:

- Podarcis milensis milensis
- Podarcis milensis gerakuniae
- Podarcis milensis schweizeri

The species is becoming rare due to habitat loss.

== Sources ==
- E. N. Arnold, J. A. Burton (1978). A Field Guide to Reptiles and Amphibians of Britain and Europe
- Amphibians and Reptiles of Europe
