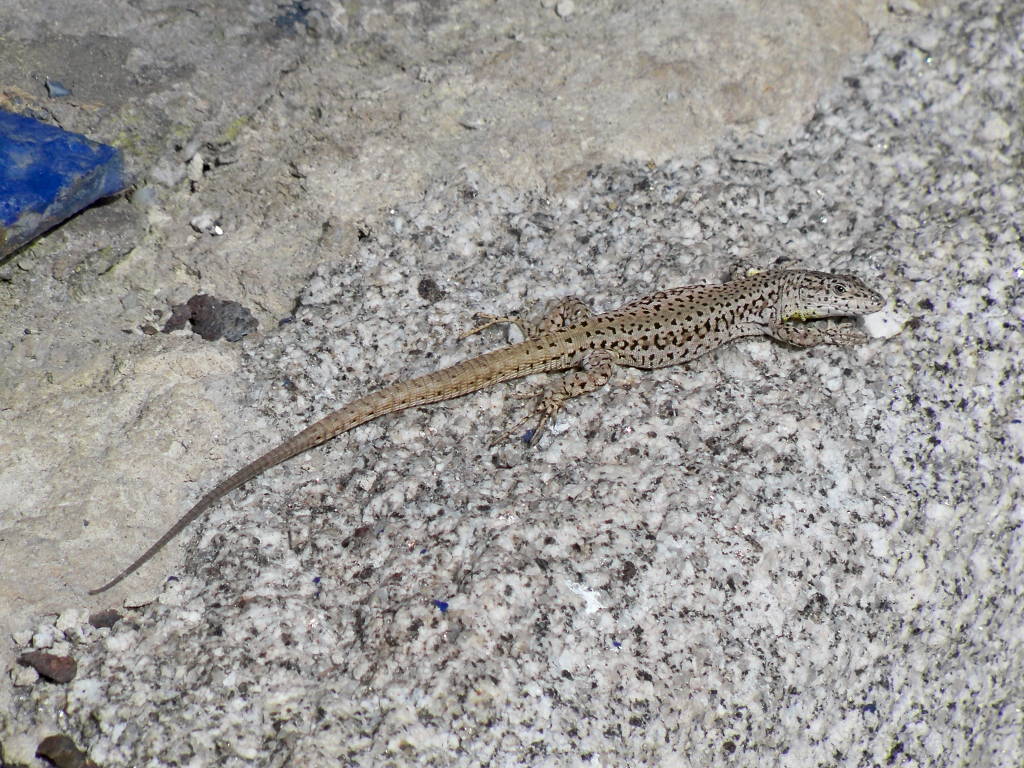

Conservation status
- Least Concern (IUCN 3.1)

Scientific classification
- Kingdom: Animalia
- Phylum: Chordata
- Class: Reptilia
- Order: Squamata
- Family: Lacertidae
- Genus: Podarcis
- Species: P. vaucheri

Binomial name
- Podarcis vaucheri (Boulenger, 1905)

Synonyms
- Lacerta muralis Var. vaucheri Boulenger, 1905; Lacerta (Podarcis) bocagei vaucheri — Mertens & L. Müller, 1940; Lacerta hispanica vaucheri — Klemmer, 1959; Podarcis hispanica vaucheri — Arnold, 1973; Podarcis vaucheri — Oliverio et al., 2000

= Podarcis vaucheri =

Species of lizard

Podarcis vaucheri, the Andalusian wall lizard, is a species of lizard in the family Lacertidae. The species is native to northern Africa and southern Spain.

== Etymology ==
The specific name, vaucheri, is in honor of Swiss botanist Henri Vaucher (1856–1910).

== Geographic range ==
P. vaucheri is found in Algeria, Morocco, Spain, and Tunisia.

== Habitat ==
The natural habitats of P. vaucheri are temperate forests, Mediterranean-type shrubby vegetation, rocky areas, pastureland, rural gardens, and urban areas, at altitudes from sea level to 3,100 m (10,200 ft).

== Reproduction ==
P. vaucheri is oviparous.

== Conservation status ==
P. vaucheri is not considered a threatened species by the International Union for Conservation of Nature (IUCN).
