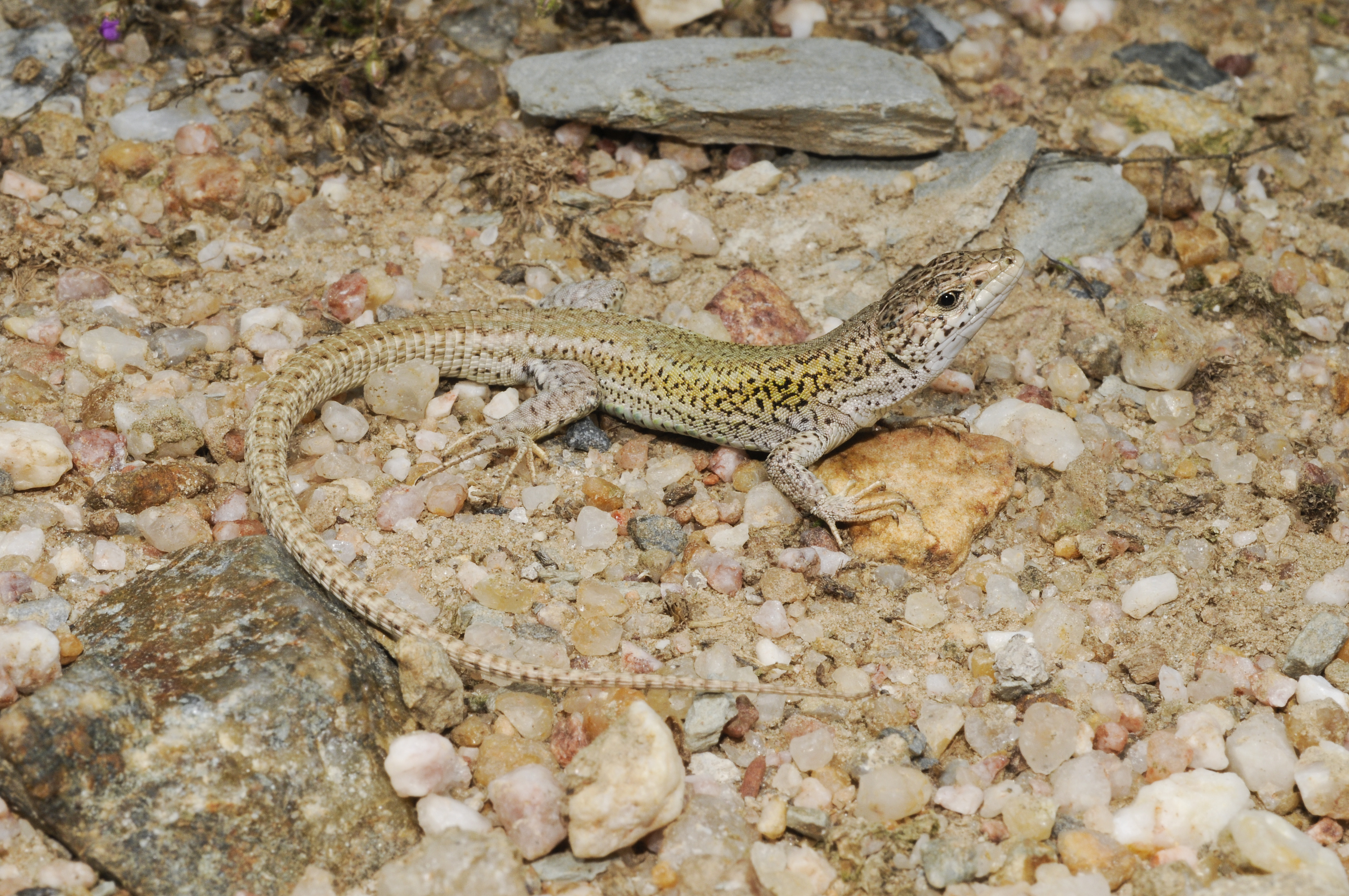

Conservation status
- Endangered (IUCN 3.1)

Scientific classification
- Kingdom: Animalia
- Phylum: Chordata
- Class: Reptilia
- Order: Squamata
- Family: Lacertidae
- Genus: Podarcis
- Species: P. carbonelli

Binomial name
- Podarcis carbonelli Pérez-Mellado, 1981

Synonyms
- Podarcis bocagei carbonelli Pérez-Mellado, 1981; Podarcis carbonelli — Sá-Sousa & Harris, 2002

= Podarcis carbonelli =

Species of lizard

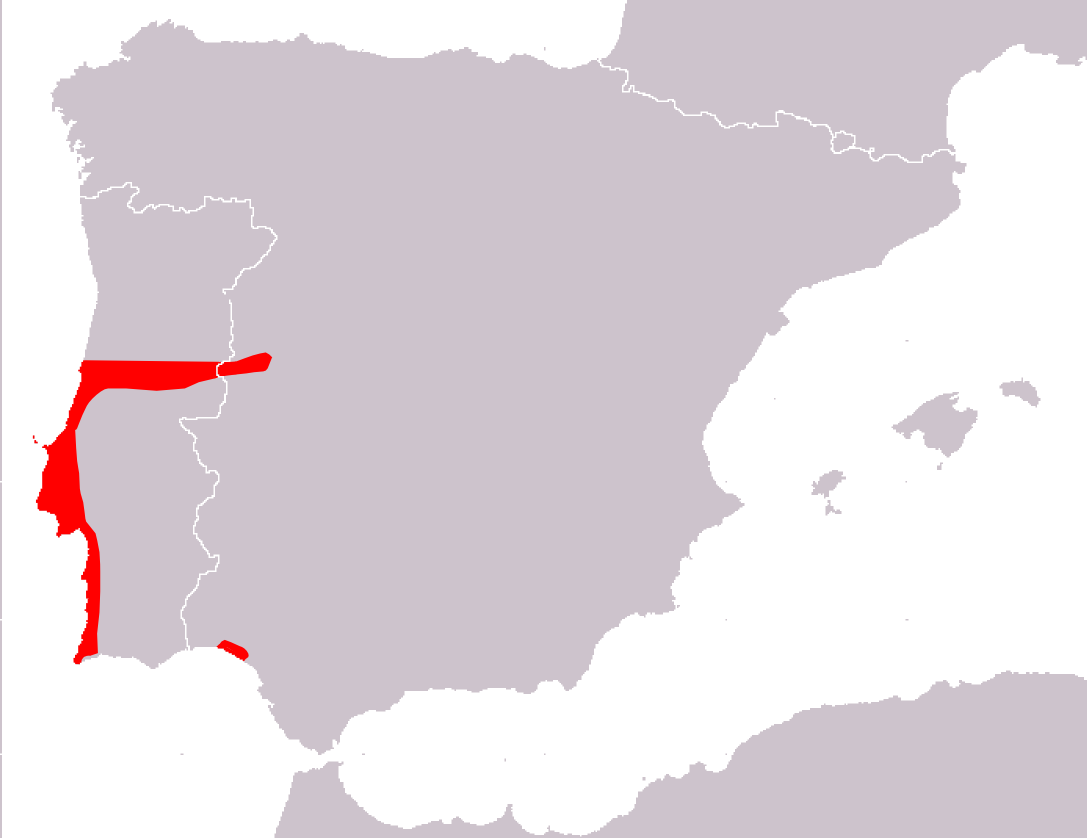
Distribution of Carbonell's wall lizard

Podarcis carbonelli, commonly known as Carbonell's wall lizard, is a species of lizard in the family Lacertidae. The species is native to Portugal and Spain.

This lizard reaches a total length (including tail) of 20 cm (8 in), and feeds primarily on small invertebrates such as insects, arachnids, and snails. Its natural habitats are temperate shrublands and sandy shores. Habitat loss threatens its survival.

== Etymology ==
The specific name, carbonelli, is in honor of "J. Carbonell" who is the wife of Pérez-Mellado.

== Description ==
Carbonell's wall lizard grows to a snout-to-vent length of 6.5 cm (2.6 in) with a tail about twice as long. Females tend to be slightly larger than males in some localities. The dorsal surface is usually grey or brown, but is sometimes green (especially so in males), copiously speckled with rows of dark markings. The flanks may also be somewhat greenish with reticulated, dark markings. The underparts are whitish and there are often small blue spots along the edge of the belly. It differs from all other Iberian Wall Lizards by generally showing greenish flanks but no green backs.

Carbonell's wall lizard much resembles the closely related Bocage's wall lizard, but that species tends to have more clearly defined markings and a yellow, orange or pink belly, and shows no green flanks and no blue outer ventral scales.

== Distribution and habitat ==
Carbonell's wall lizard is native to Portugal and Spain. Its geographic range consists of a number of isolated populations in western and central Portugal, another in Coto Doñana in southwestern Spain and a separate subspecies is present on the Berlenga Islands off the coast of Portugal. Being specialized on Mediterranean climates with cool to warm summers, it has stable populations at the Atlantic coast, occupying sand dunes with barely any vegetation. However, the remaining inland populations in the western mountainous Sistema Central, where it inhabits up to 1,200 m (3,940 ft), seem to rapidly decrease, probably a result of global warming.

== Subspecies ==
Two subspecies are recognized:

- Podarcis carbonelli carbonelli Pérez-Mellado, 1981, the nominate subspecies, found on the Iberian mainland.
- Podarcis carbonelli berlengensis (Vicente, 1985), endemic to the Berlengas Islands, and an example of island gigantism. Apart from being larger than the mainland subspecies, P. c. berlengensis shows slight differences in coloration.

== Behaviour ==
Carbonell's wall lizard is often seen on dry banks where it may be present in large numbers. It takes refuge in cracks and among tree roots.

== Diet ==
P. carbonelli feeds mainly on arthropods but, particularly on the Berlenga Islands, also consumes snails.

== Reproduction ==
P. carbonelli is oviparous. In central Portugal there is usually one clutch of two eggs each year, but in the Berlengas, several clutches of up to four eggs are laid. These take ten to fifteen weeks to hatch.

== Status ==
Carbonell's wall lizard has a number of isolated populations and its total geographic range is less than 5,000 square kilometres (1,900 sq mi). It lives in oak woodland and shrubland and although some populations are in protected areas, others are subject to habitat degradation. Although it is common in some suitable habitats, in general the population is thought to be declining and the International Union for Conservation of Nature has assessed it as being an "Vulnerable species".

== See also ==
The Italian wall lizard, a related species.
