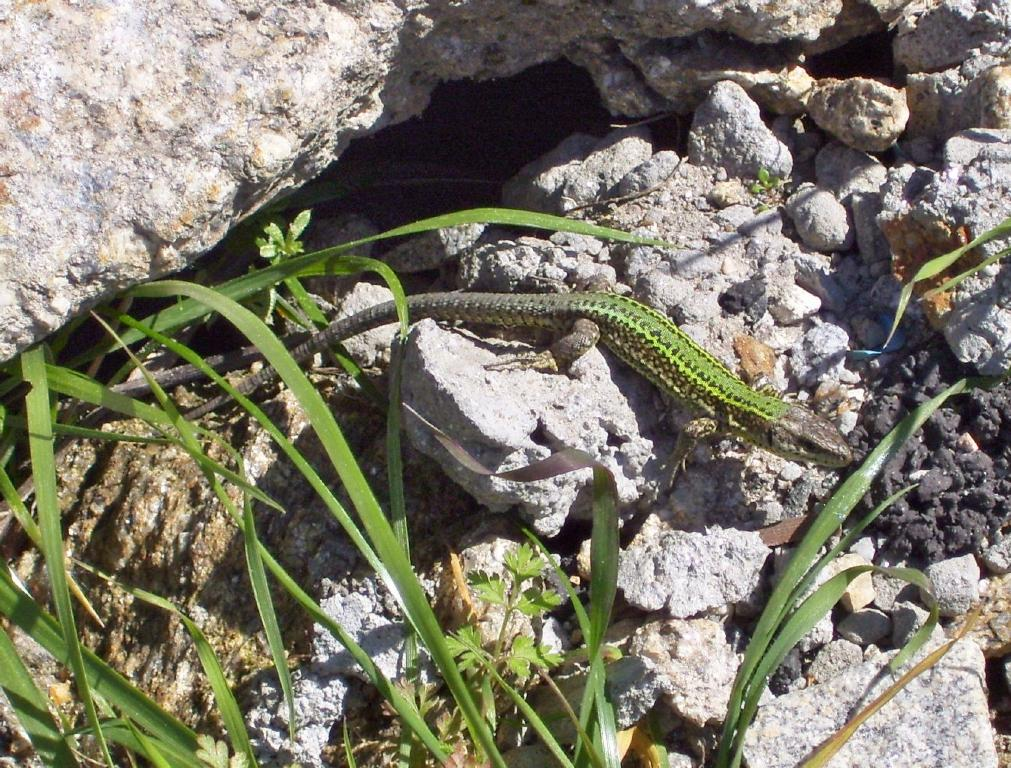
- Male
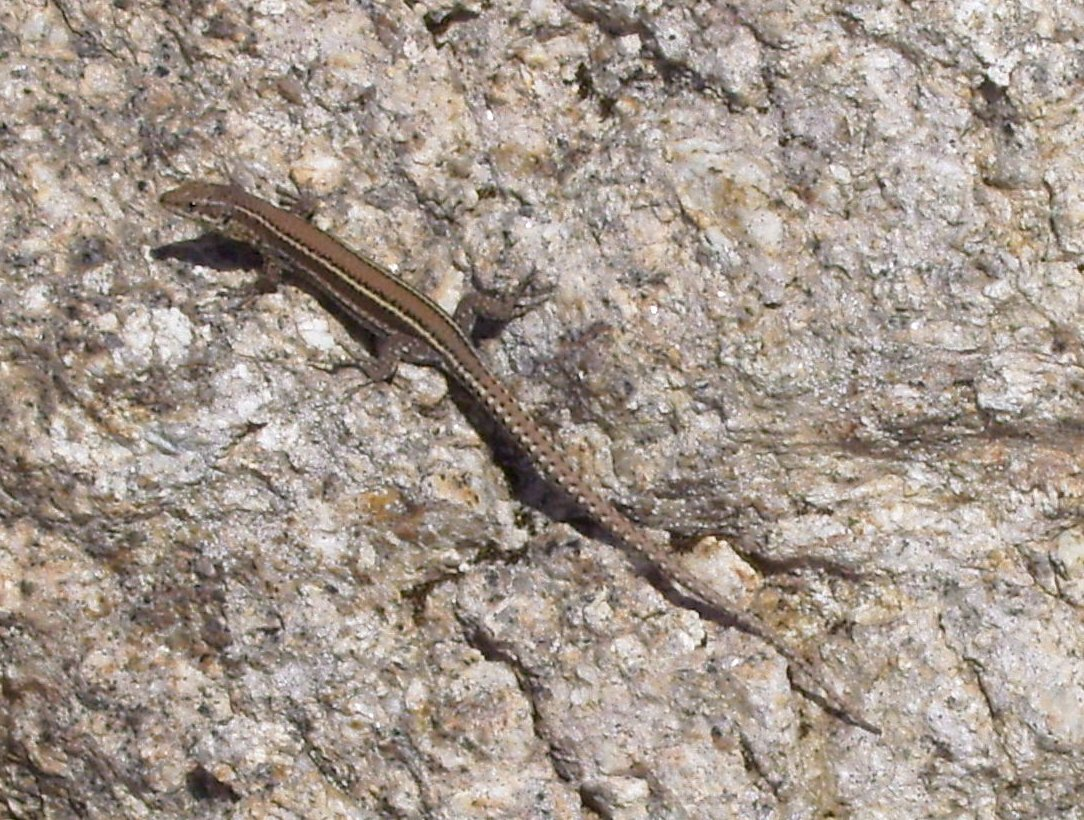
- Female

Conservation status
- Least Concern (IUCN 3.1)

Scientific classification
- Kingdom: Animalia
- Phylum: Chordata
- Class: Reptilia
- Order: Squamata
- Family: Lacertidae
- Genus: Podarcis
- Species: P. bocagei

Binomial name
- Podarcis bocagei (Seoane, 1885)
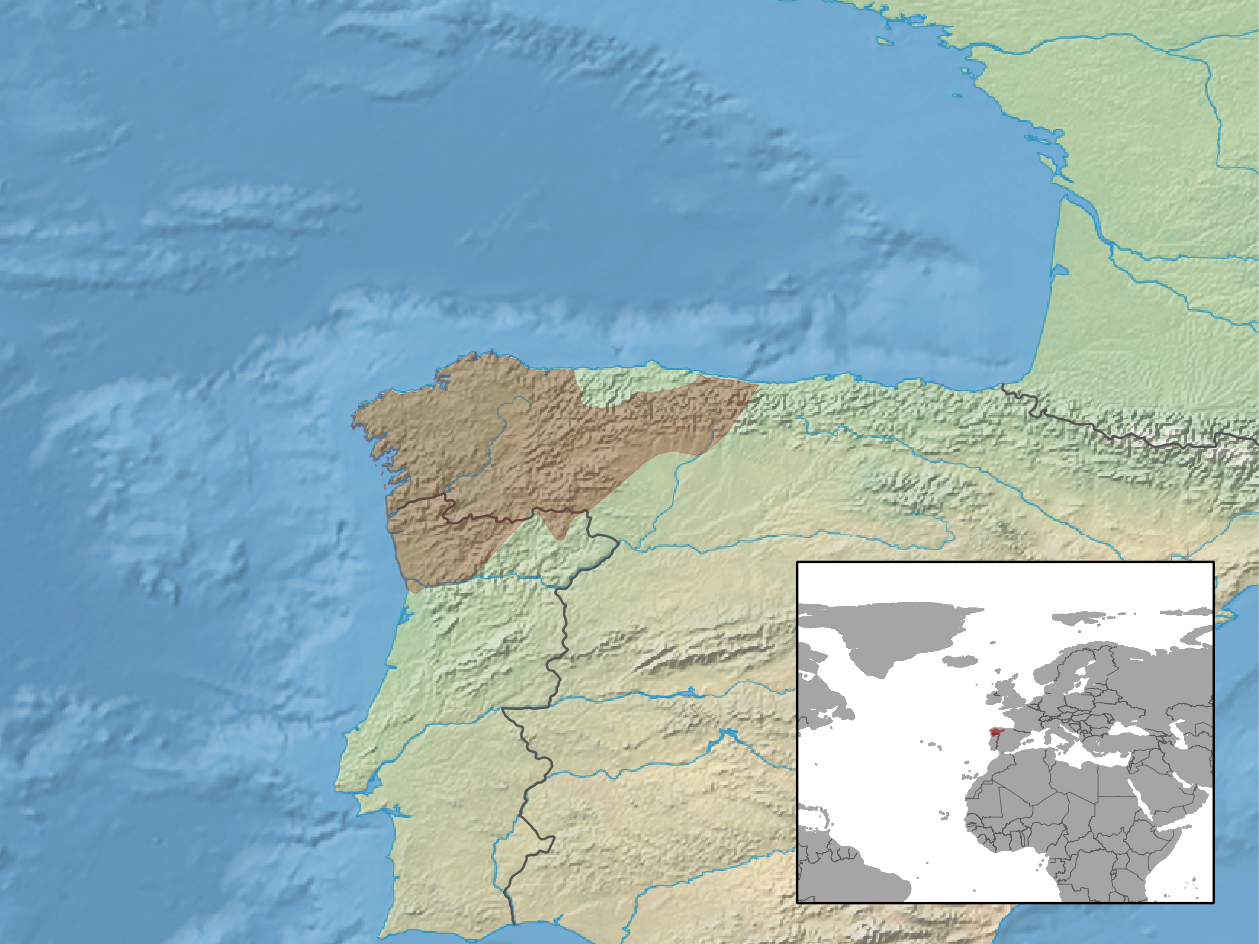

Synonyms
- Lacerta muralis var. bocagei Seoane, 1885; Lacerta muralis bocagei — Galán, 1931; Podarcis bocagei — Engelmann et al., 1993

= Bocage's wall lizard =

Species of lizard

Bocage's wall lizard (Podarcis bocagei) is a species of lizard in the family Lacertidae. The species is endemic to the Iberian Peninsula. Its natural habitats are temperate forests, temperate shrubland, Mediterranean-type shrubby vegetation, sandy shores, rural gardens, and urban areas. The IUCN does not consider it to be threatened.

== Etymology ==
Both the specific name, bocagei, and the common name, Bocage's wall lizard, are in honor of Portuguese zoologist José Vicente Barbosa du Bocage.

== Description ==
Bocage's wall lizard grows to a snout-to-vent length (SVL) of about 7 cm (2.8 in), with a tail twice SVL. Males are larger than females. It is a sturdy lizard, somewhat flattened, and resembling Carbonell's wall lizard (Podarcis carbonelli). The dorsal surface is usually grey or yellowish-brown, but is sometimes green in males, copiously speckled with rows of dark markings. The flanks may be brownish or yellowish. The underparts are white, yellow, pink, or orange, but there are not any of the small blue spots along the edge of the belly which are often present in Carbonell's wall lizard.

== Geographic range ==
Bocage's wall lizard is found in northern Portugal and northwestern Spain as far southwards as the River Douro.

== Habitat ==
Typical habitats of P. bocagei are open deciduous woodland, scrubland, coastal sand dunes, and cultivated areas, including in villages, at altitudes from sea level to 1,900 m (6,200 ft).

== Reproduction ==
P. bocagei is oviparous. Sexually mature females lay 2–4 clutches of eggs each year. Clutch size varies from 2 to 9 eggs.

== Conservation status ==
Bocage's wall lizard is common in suitable habitat within its range. The population is steady and faces no specific threats and the International Union for Conservation of Nature has assessed its conservation status as being of "least concern".
