= List of reptiles of Greece =

This list of the reptiles of Greece is primarily based on the Atlas of the Amphibians and Reptiles of Greece (2020), published under the auspices of the Societas Hellenica Herpetologica, supplemented by the IUCN Red List. Of the 70 (IUCN) or 76 (Atlas) species recognized, 11 are endemic, while 3 are assessed as endangered.

For 5 species included in the Atlas currently there is no global assessment on the IUCN Red List ("NR" below), while 1 species for which there is an IUCN Red List assessment is not included in the Atlas ( spotted whip snake, Hemorrhois ravergieri LC^{IUCN}).

== Order: Squamata (lizards, snakes, and amphisbaenians) ==
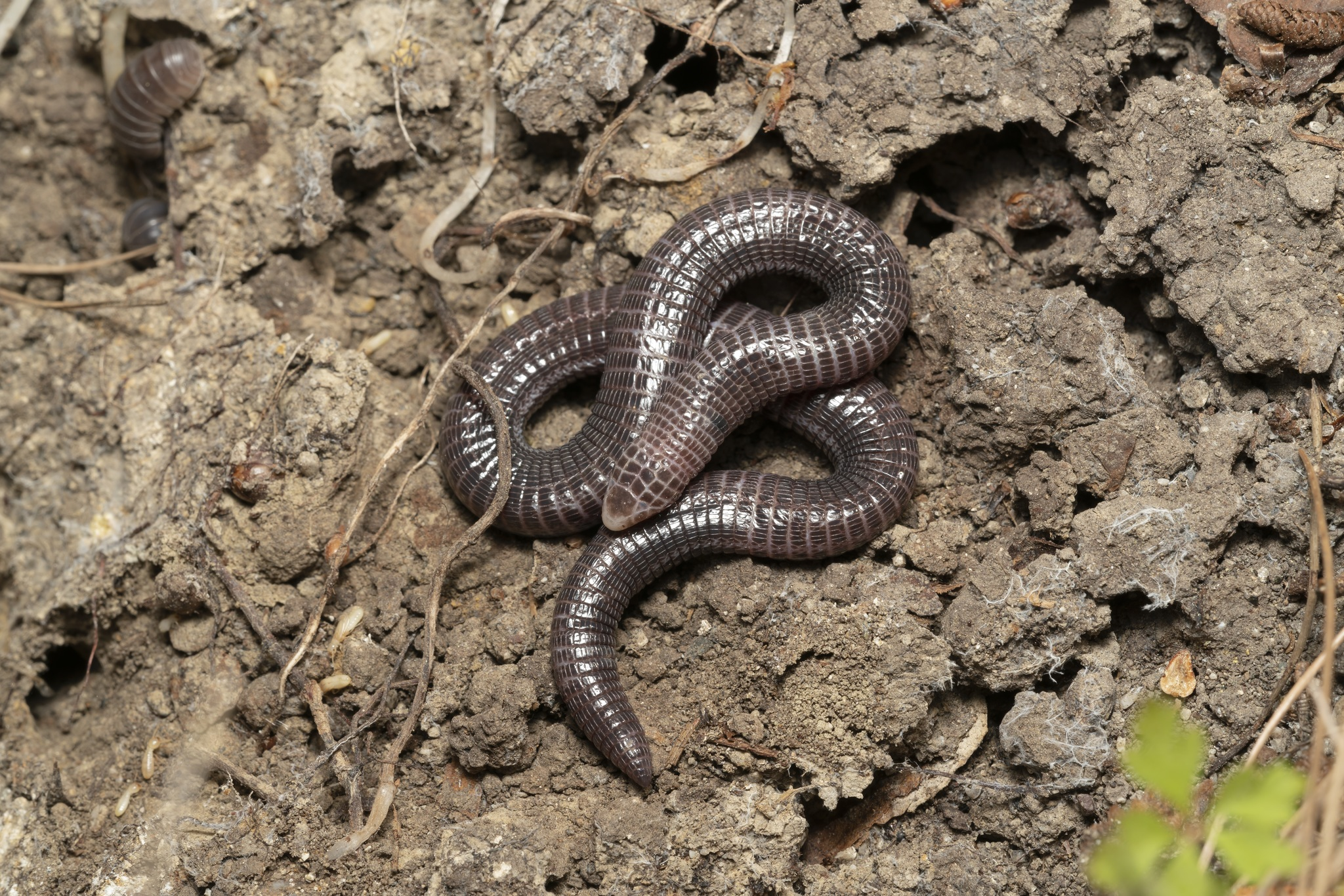
Turkish worm lizard, Blanus strauchi

=== Suborder: Amphisbaenia (amphisbaenians) ===
- Family: Amphisbaenidae
  - Genus: Blanus
    - Turkish worm lizard, Blanus strauchi LC^{IUCN}

=== Suborder: Lacertilia (lizards) ===
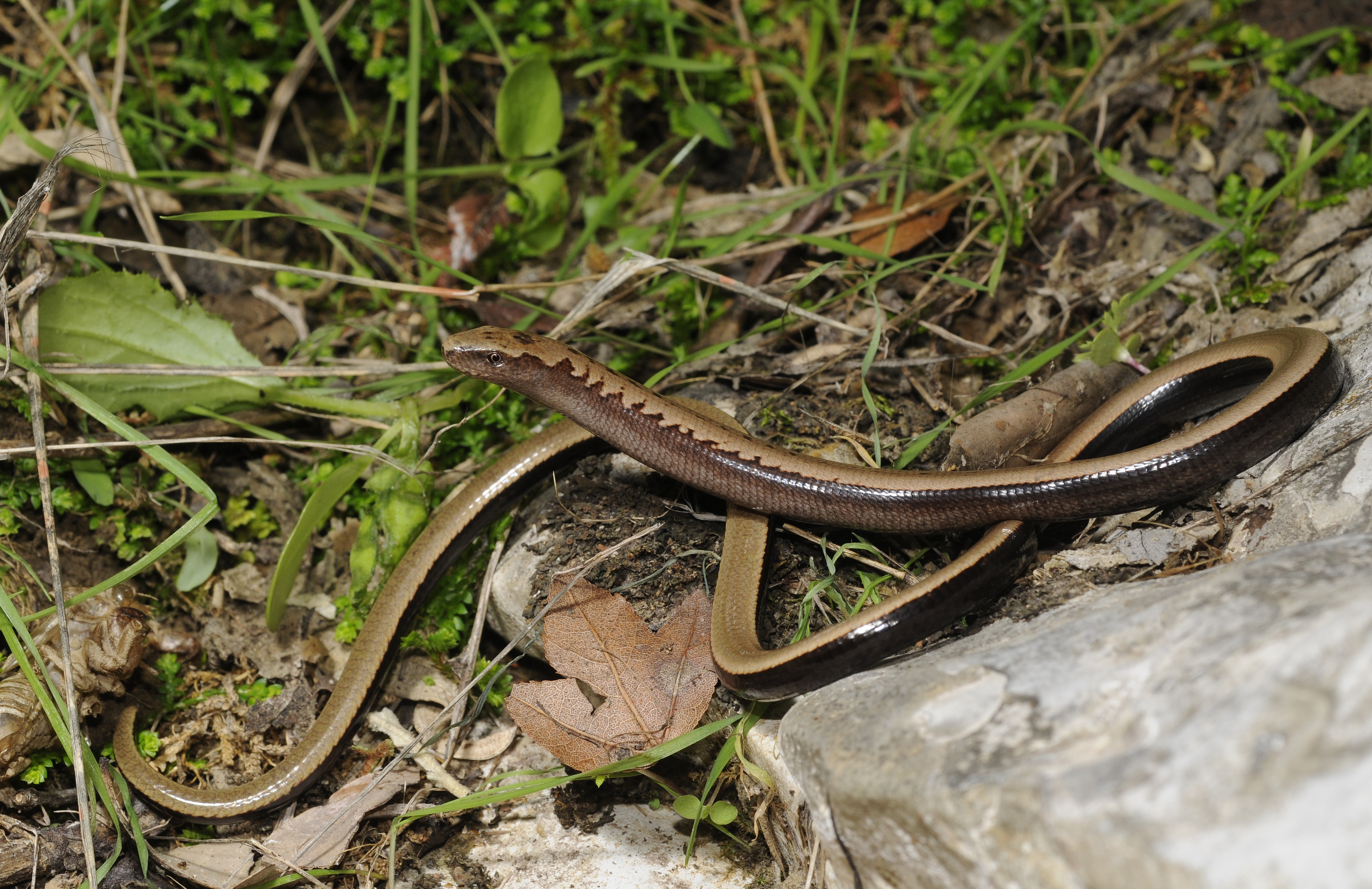
Peloponnese slow worm, Anguis cephallonica

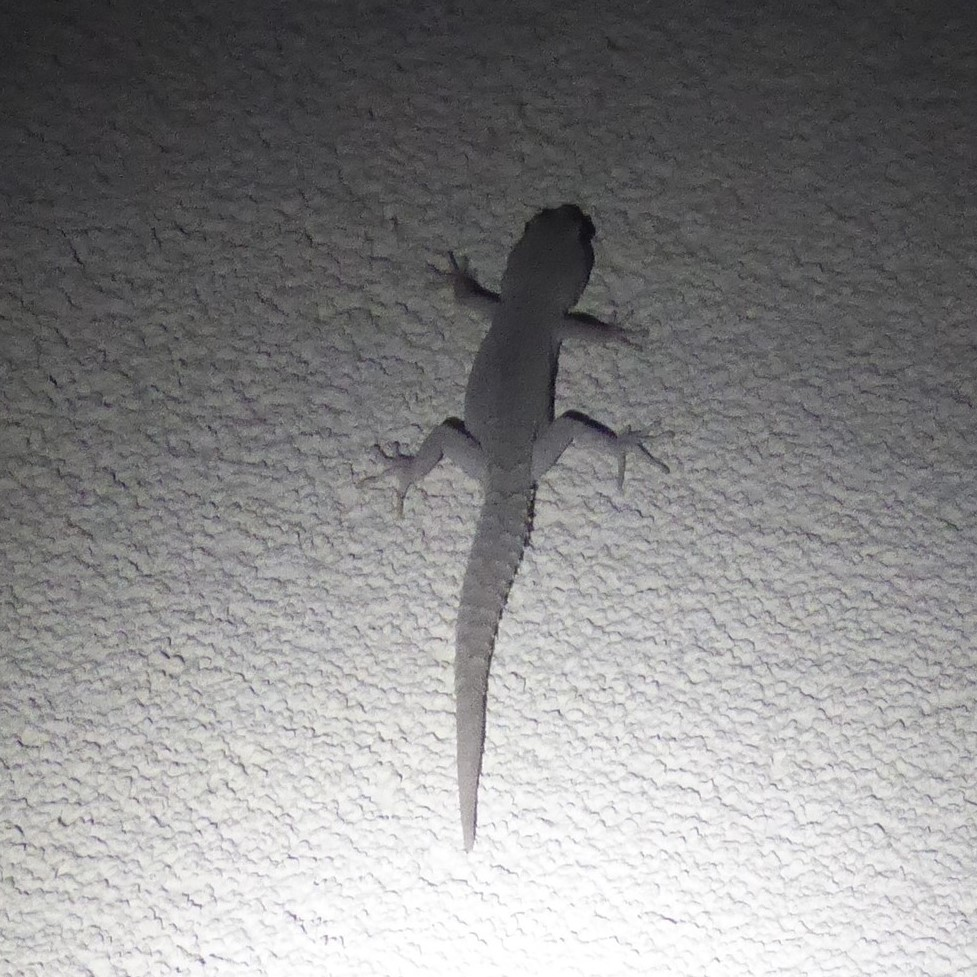
Barton's thin-toed gecko, Mediodactylus bartoni

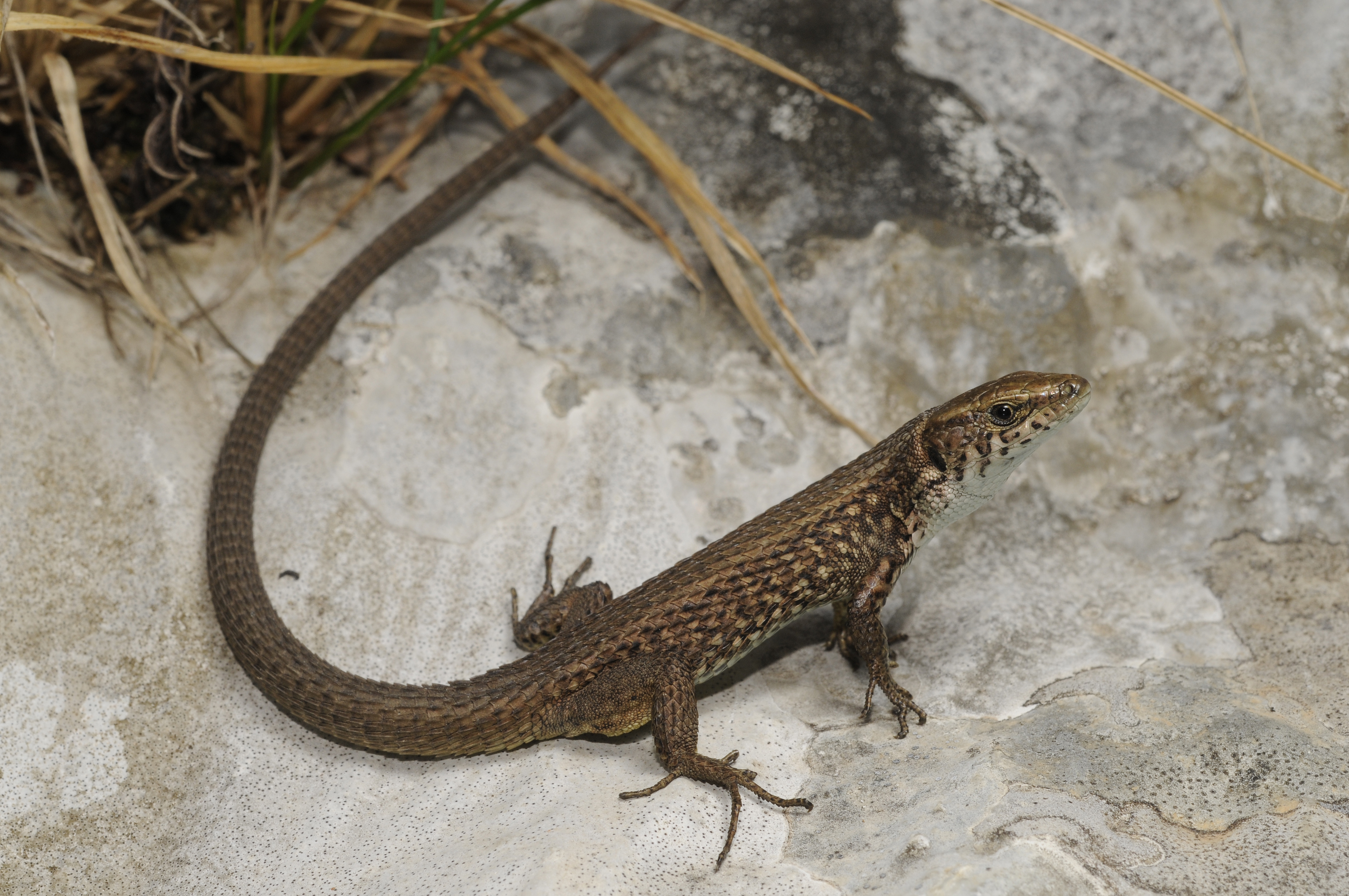
Greek algyroides, Algyroides moreoticus

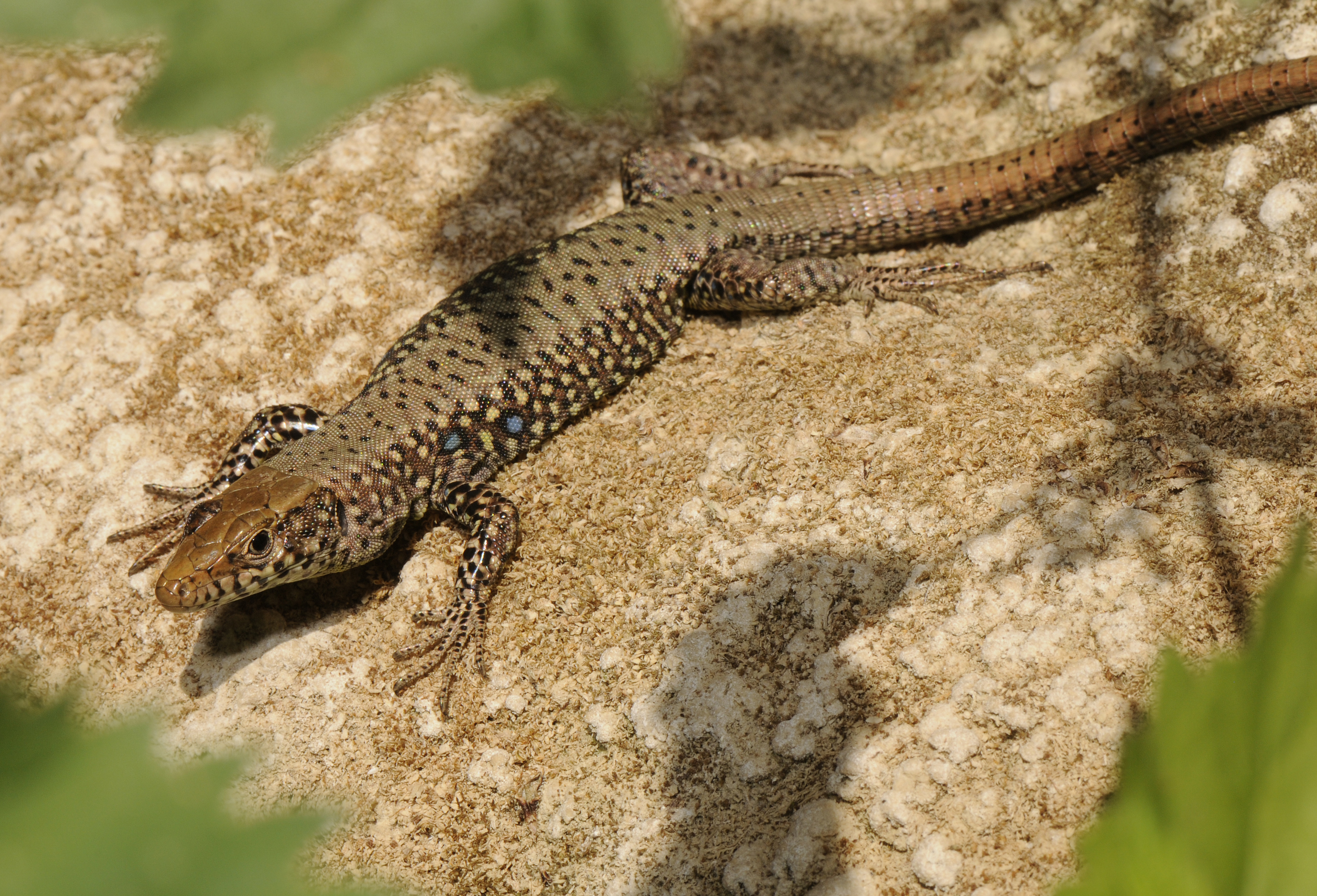
Greek rock lizard, Hellenolacerta graeca

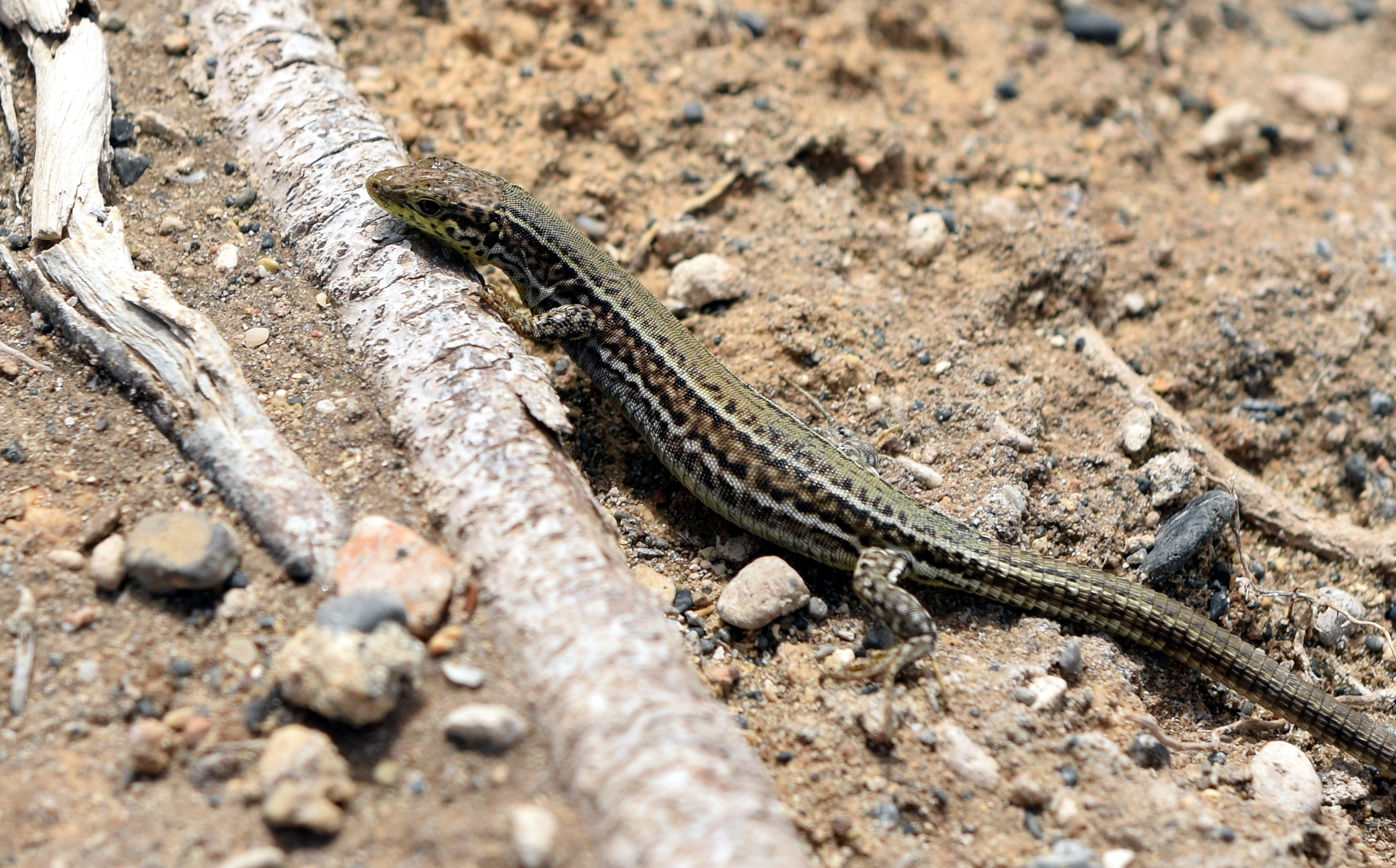
Cretan wall lizard, Podarcis cretensis

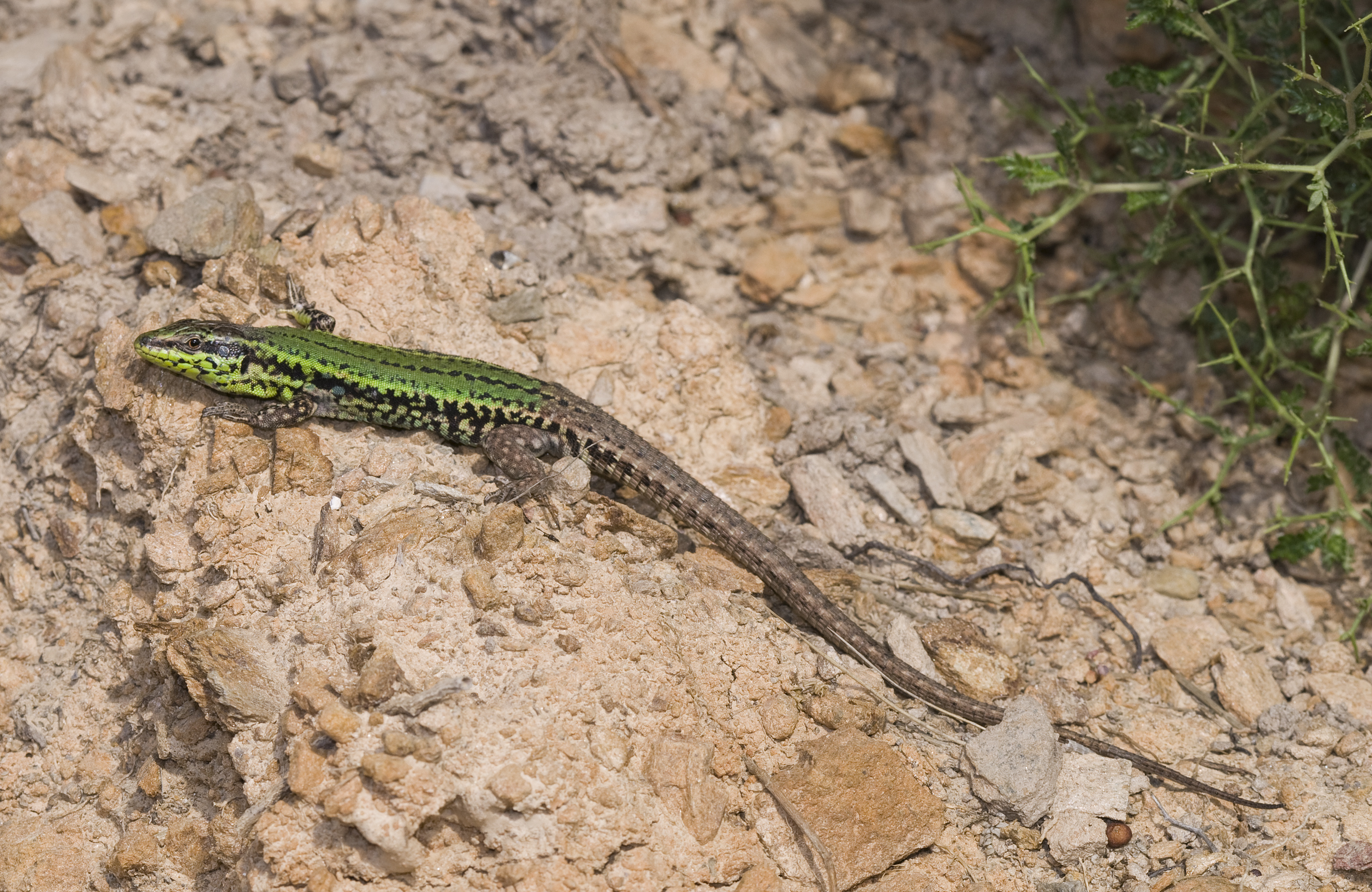
Skyros wall lizard, Podarcis gaigeae

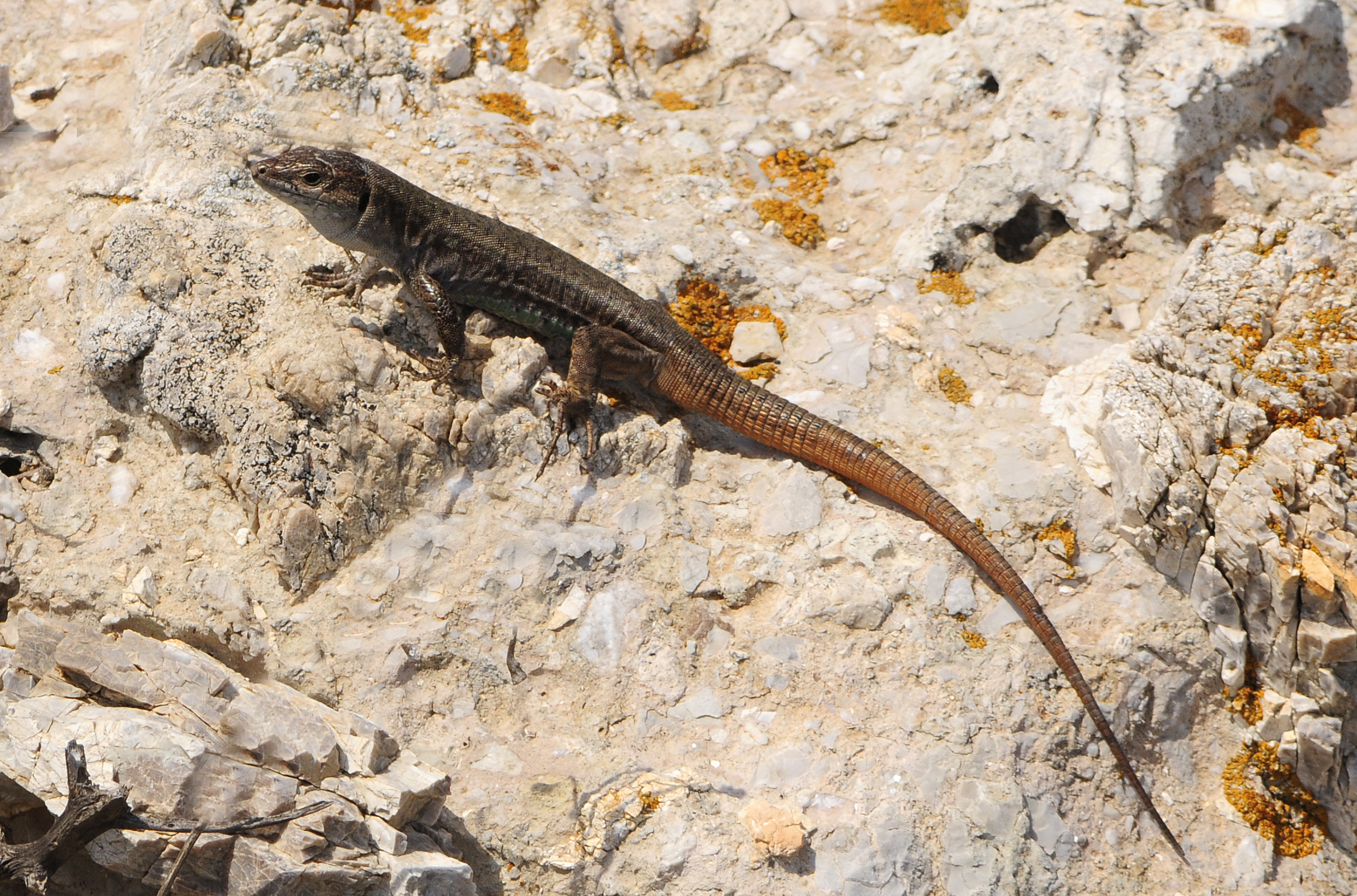
Pori wall lizard, Podarcis levendis

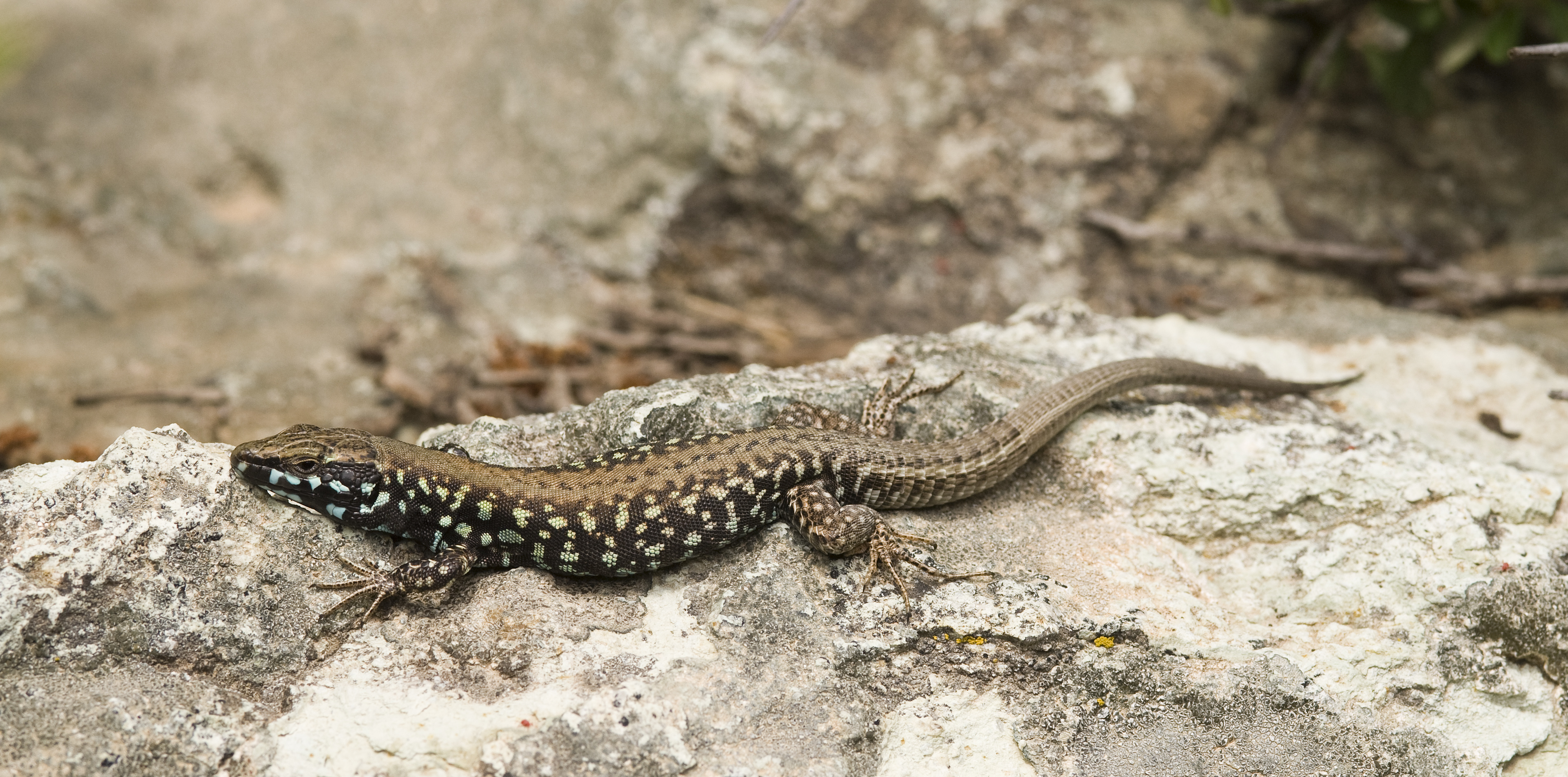
Milos wall lizard, Podarcis milensis

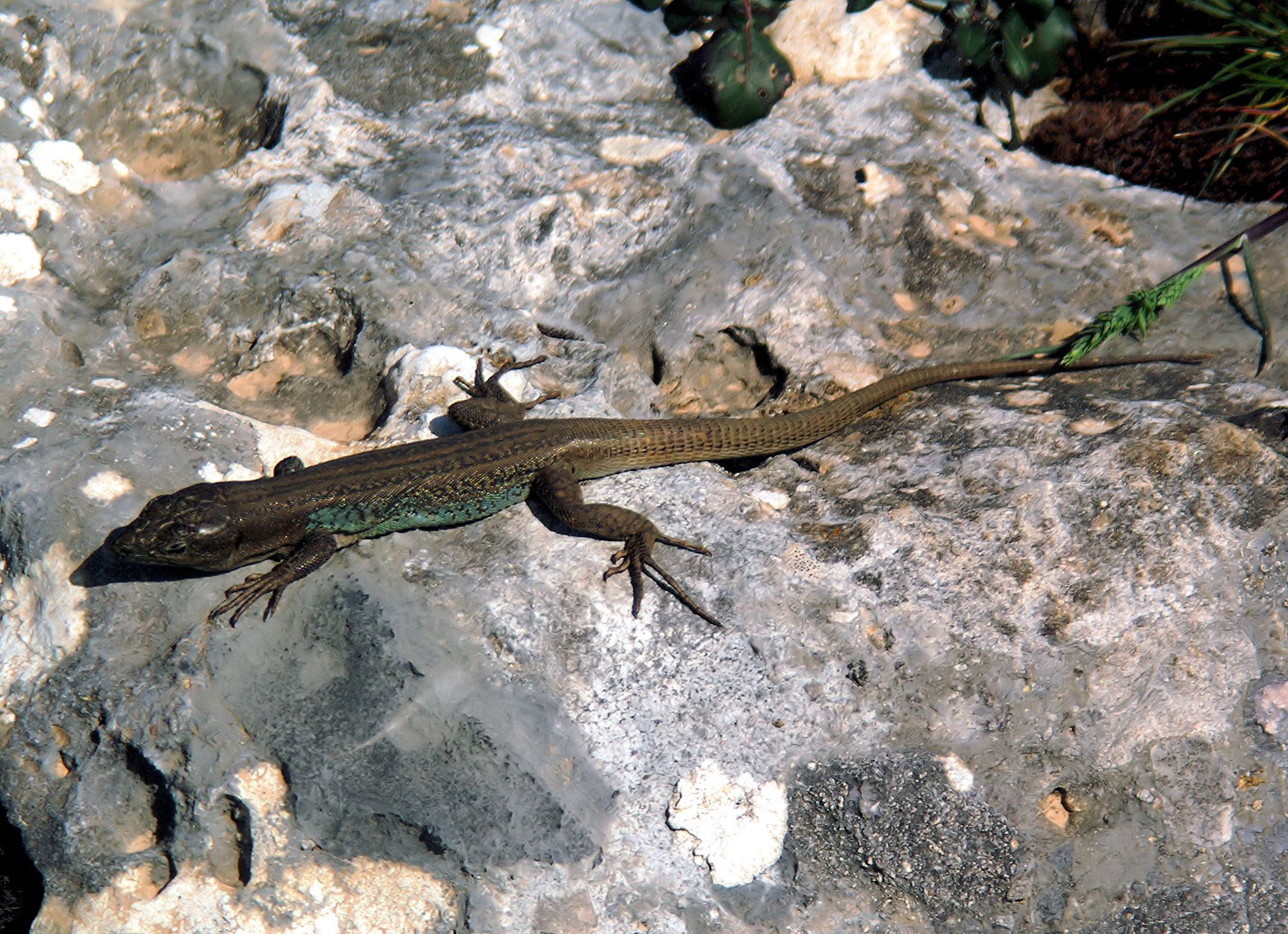
Peloponnese wall lizard, Podarcis peloponnesiacus

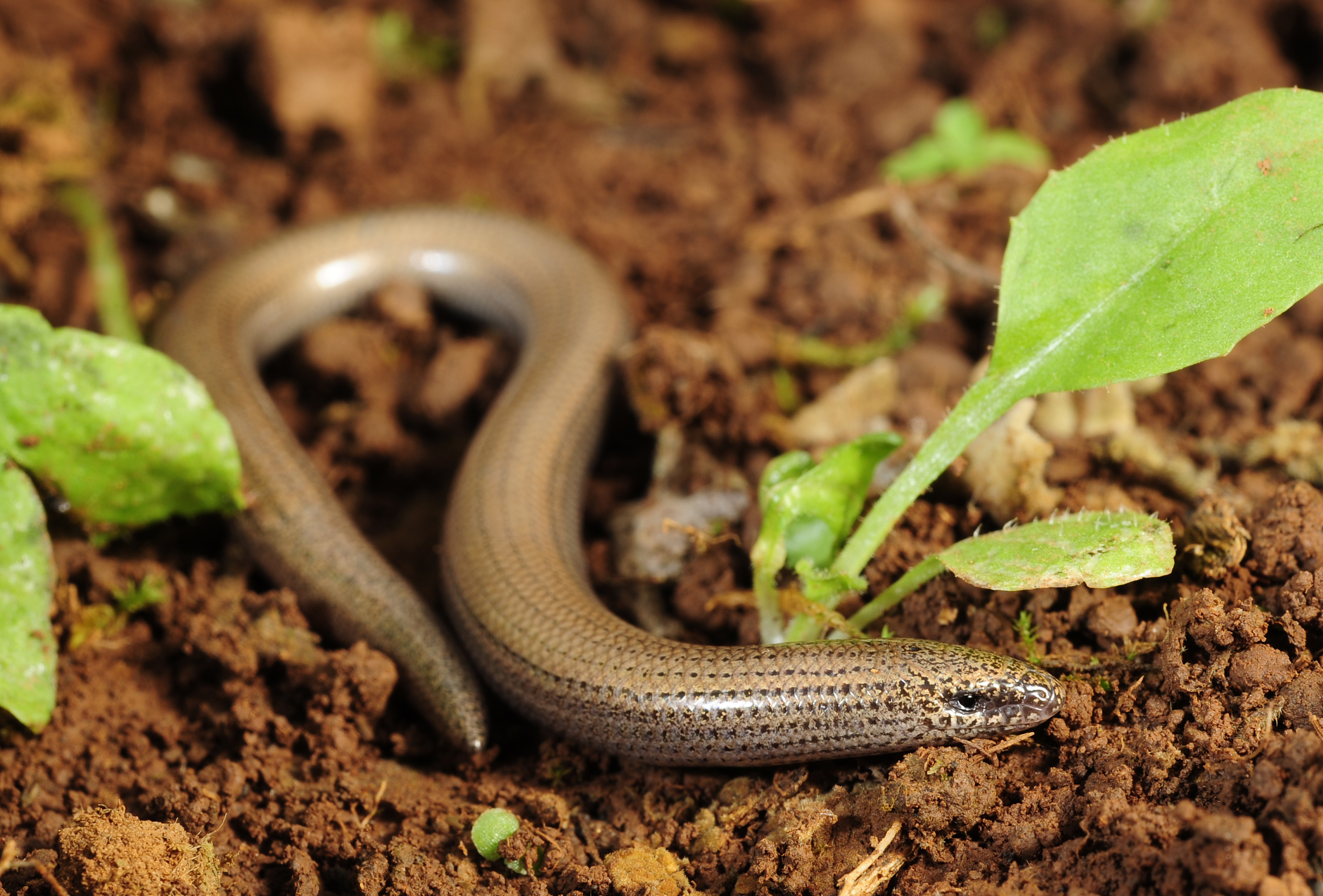
Greek snake skink, Ophiomorus punctatissimus

- Family: Agamidae
  - Genus: Stellagama
    - Starred agama, Laudakia stellio LC^{IUCN}
- Family: Anguidae
  - Genus: Anguis
    - Peloponnese slow worm, Anguis cephallonica NT^{IUCN} (endemic)
    - Slow worm, Anguis fragilis LC^{IUCN}
    - Greek slow worm, Anguis graeca LC^{IUCN}
  - Genus: Pseudopus
    - European glass lizard, Pseudopus apodus LC^{IUCN}
- Family: Chamaeleonidae
  - Genus: Chamaeleo
    - African chameleon, Chamaeleo africanus LC^{IUCN}
    - Mediterranean chameleon, Chamaeleo chamaeleon LC^{IUCN}
- Family: Gekkonidae
  - Genus: Hemidactylus
    - Turkish gecko, Hemidactylus turcicus LC^{IUCN}
  - Genus: Mediodactylus
    - Barton's thin-toed gecko, Mediodactylus bartoni LC^{IUCN} (endemic)
    - Mediterranean thin-toed gecko, Mediodactylus danilewskii (NR)
    - Kotschy's gecko, Mediodactylus kotschyi LC^{IUCN}
    - Oertzen's thin-toed gecko, Mediodactylus oertzeni LC^{IUCN} (endemic)
    - Eastern Mediterranean thin-toed gecko, Mediodactylus orientalis (NR)
  - Genus: Tarentola
    - Common wall gecko, Tarentola mauritanica LC^{IUCN}
- Family: Lacertidae
  - Genus: Algyroides
    - Greek algyroides, Algyroides moreoticus NT^{IUCN} (endemic)
    - Dalmatian algyroides, Algyroides nigropunctatus LC^{IUCN}
  - Genus: Anatololacerta
    - Anatolian rock lizard, Anatololacerta anatolica LC^{IUCN}
    - Budak's rock lizard, Anatololacerta finikensis (NR)
    - Pelasgian rock lizard, Anatololacerta pelasgiana LC^{IUCN}
  - Genus: Darevskia
    - Meadow lizard, Darevskia praticola NT^{IUCN}
  - Genus: Hellenolacerta
    - Greek rock lizard, Hellenolacerta graeca LC^{IUCN} (endemic)
  - Genus: Lacerta
    - Sand lizard, Lacerta agilis LC^{IUCN}
    - Balkan green lizard, Lacerta trilineata LC^{IUCN}
    - European green lizard, Lacerta viridis LC^{IUCN}
  - Genus: Ophisops
    - Snake-eyed lizard, Ophisops elegans LC^{IUCN}
  - Genus: Podarcis
    - Cretan wall lizard, Podarcis cretensis LC^{IUCN} (endemic)
    - Erhard's wall lizard, Podarcis erhardii LC^{IUCN}
    - Skyros wall lizard, Podarcis gaigeae VU^{IUCN} (endemic)
    - Ionian wall lizard, Podarcis ionicus LC^{IUCN}
    - Pori wall lizard, Podarcis levendis VU^{IUCN} (endemic)
    - Milos wall lizard, Podarcis milensis VU^{IUCN} (endemic)
    - Common wall lizard, Podarcis muralis LC^{IUCN}
    - Peloponnese wall lizard, Podarcis peloponnesiacus LC^{IUCN} (endemic)
    - Italian wall lizard, Podarcis siculus LC^{IUCN}
    - Balkan wall lizard, Podarcis tauricus LC^{IUCN}
    - Andalusian wall lizard, Podarcis vaucheri LC^{IUCN}
  - Genus: Zootoca
    - Viviparous lizard, Zootoca vivipara LC^{IUCN}
- Family: Scincidae
  - Genus: Ablepharus
    - Juniper skink, Ablepharus kitaibelii LC^{IUCN}
  - Genus: Chalcides
    - Ocellated skink, Chalcides ocellatus LC^{IUCN}
  - Genus: Heremites
    - Levant skink, Heremites auratus LC^{IUCN}
  - Genus: Ophiomorus
    - Anatolian limbless skink, Ophiomorus kardesi (NR)
    - Greek snake skink, Ophiomorus punctatissimus LC^{IUCN} (endemic)

=== Suborder: Serpentes (snakes) ===
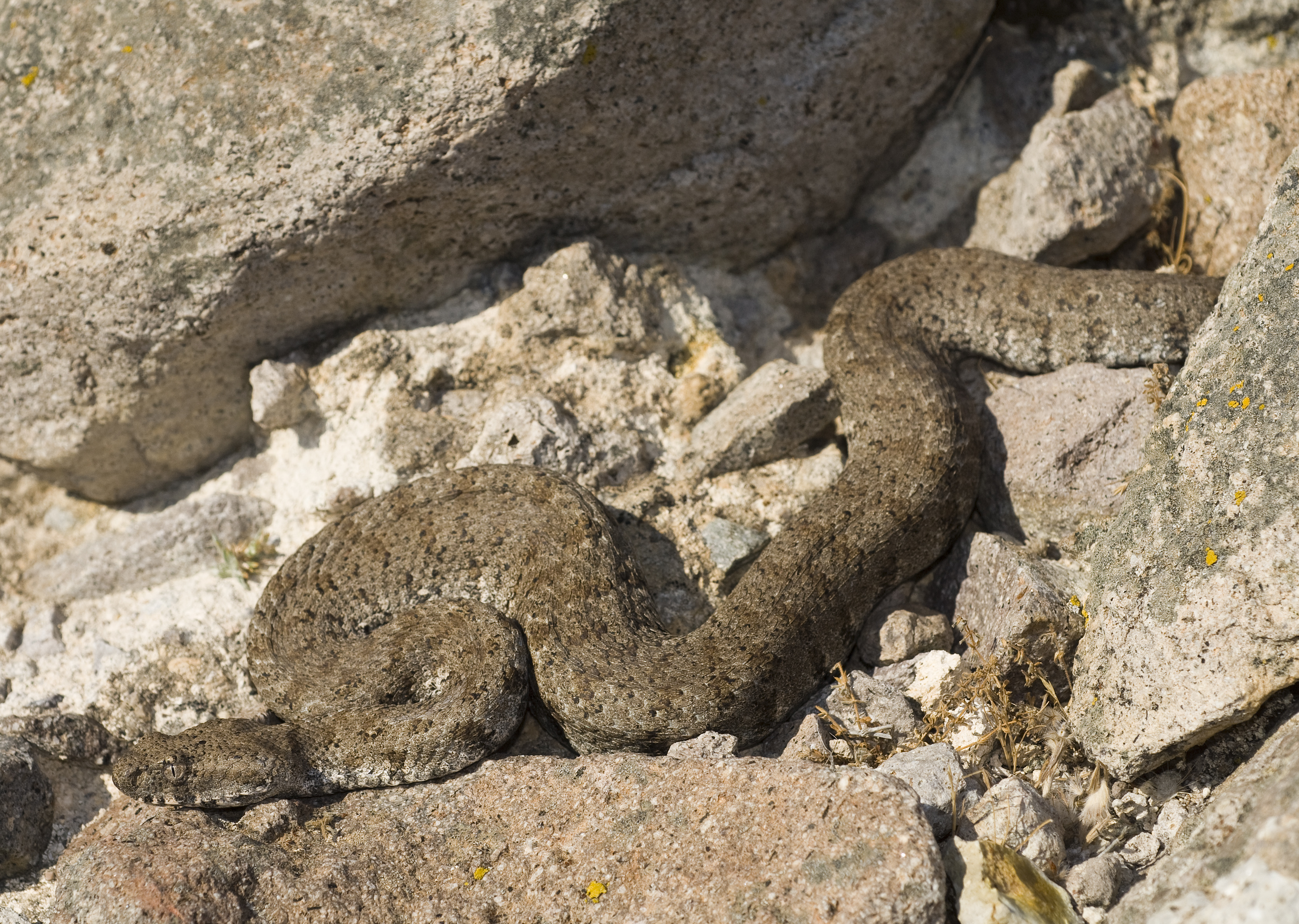
Cyclades blunt-nosed viper, Macrovipera schweizeri

- Family: Colubridae
  - Genus: Coronella
    - Smooth snake, Coronella austriaca LC^{IUCN}
  - Genus: Dolichophis
    - Caspian whipsnake, Dolichophis caspius LC^{IUCN}
    - Black whipsnake, Dolichophis jugularis LC^{IUCN}
  - Genus: Eirenis
    - Dwarf snake, Eirenis modestus LC^{IUCN}
  - Genus: Elaphe
    - Four-lined snake, Elaphe quatuorlineata LC^{IUCN}
    - Blotched snake, Elaphe sauromates LC^{IUCN}
  - Genus: Hierophis
    - Balkan whip snake, Hierophis gemonensis LC^{IUCN}
    - Green whip snake, Hierophis viridiflavus LC^{IUCN}
  - Genus: Hemorrhois
    - Coin-marked snake, Hemorrhois nummifer LC^{IUCN}
  - Genus: Malpolon
    - Eastern Montpellier snake, Malpolon insignitus LC^{IUCN}
  - Genus: Natrix
    - Grass snake, Natrix natrix LC^{IUCN}
    - Dice snake, Natrix tessellata LC^{IUCN}
  - Genus: Platyceps
    - Slender whipsnake, Platyceps najadum LC^{IUCN}
  - Genus: Telescopus
    - European cat snake, Telescopus fallax LC^{IUCN}
  - Genus: Zamenis
    - Aesculapian ratsnake, Zamenis longissima LC^{IUCN}
    - European ratsnake, Zamenis situla LC^{IUCN}
- Family: Boidae
  - Genus: Eryx
    - Javelin sand boa, Eryx jaculus LC^{IUCN}
- Family: Typhlopidae
  - Genus: Xerotyphlops
    - Eurasian blind snake, Xerotyphlops vermicularis LC^{IUCN}
- Family: Viperidae
  - Genus: Macrovipera
    - Cyclades blunt-nosed viper, Macrovipera schweizeri EN^{IUCN} (endemic)
  - Genus: Montivipera
    - Rock viper, Montivipera xanthina LC^{IUCN}
  - Genus: Vipera
    - Long-nosed viper, Vipera ammodytes LC^{IUCN}
    - Adder, Vipera berus LC^{IUCN}
    - Greek meadow viper, Vipera graeca EN^{IUCN}

== Order: Testudines (turtles) ==
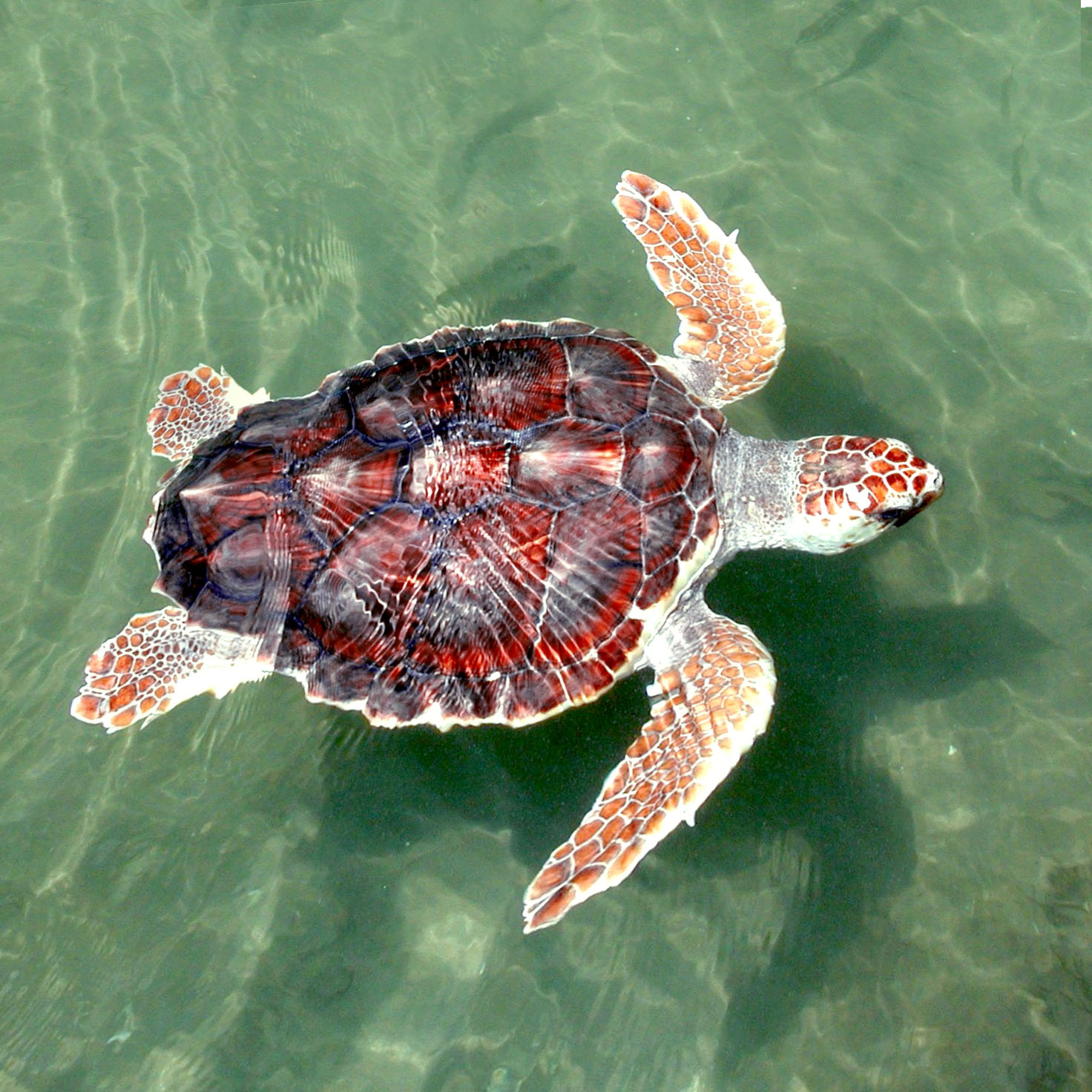
Loggerhead sea turtle, Caretta caretta

=== Superfamily: Chelonioidea (sea turtles) ===
- Family: Cheloniidae
  - Genus: Caretta
    - Loggerhead sea turtle, Caretta caretta VU^{IUCN}
  - Genus: Chelonia
    - Green sea turtle, Chelonia mydas EN^{IUCN}
- Family: Dermochelyidae
  - Genus: Dermochelys
    - Leatherback sea turtle, Dermochelys coriacea VU^{IUCN}

=== Superfamily: Testudinoidea (pond turtles, geoemydid turtles, tortoises) ===
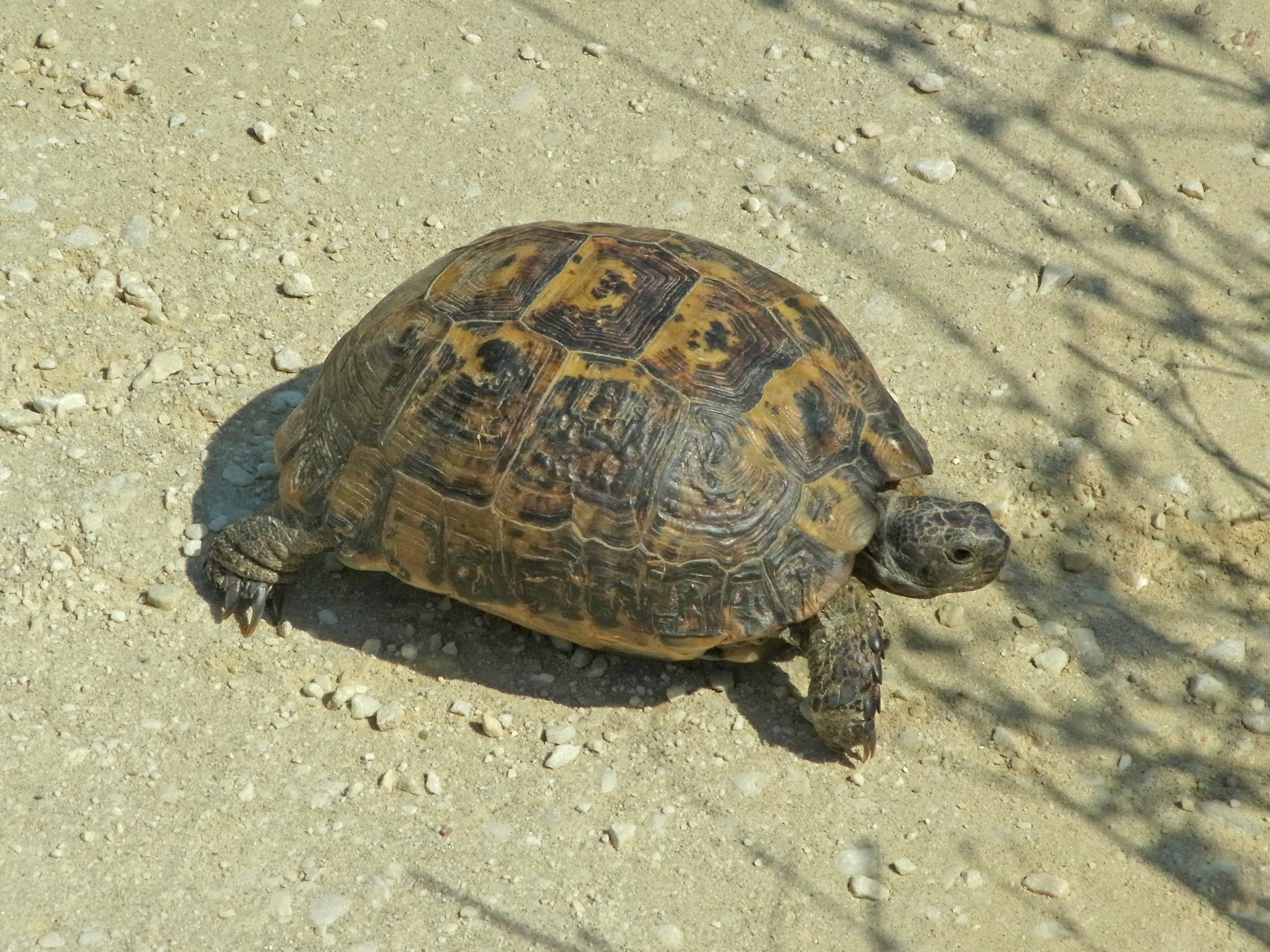
Greek tortoise, Testudo graeca

- Family: Emydidae
  - Genus: Emys
    - European pond turtle, Emys orbicularis NT^{IUCN}
  - Genus: Trachemys
    - Pond slider, Trachemys scripta LC^{IUCN}
- Family: Geoemydidae
  - Genus: Mauremys
    - Balkan pond turtle, Mauremys rivulata LC^{IUCN}
- Family: Testudinidae
  - Genus: Testudo
    - Greek tortoise, Testudo graeca VU^{IUCN}
    - Hermann's tortoise, Testudo hermanni VU^{IUCN}
    - Marginated tortoise, Testudo marginata LC^{IUCN}

=== Superfamily: Trionychia (softshell turtles) ===
- Family: Trionychidae
  - Genus: Trionyx
    - African softshell turtle, Trionyx triunguis VU^{IUCN}

== See also ==
- List of mammals of Greece
- List of birds of Greece
- List of amphibians of Greece
- List of freshwater fishes of Greece
