= List of mammals of Greece =

This list shows the IUCN Red List status of the 115 mammal species occurring in Greece. Two of them are endangered, twelve are vulnerable, and six are near threatened.

Icons which state each species' global IUCN status:
CR	Critically Endangered	In imminent risk of extinction in the wild
EN	Endangered	Facing an extremely high risk of extinction in the wild
VU	Vulnerable	Facing a high risk of extinction in the wild
NT	Near Threatened	Doesn't meet any criteria that would categorise it as risking extinction but likely to in the future
LC	Least Concern	No current identifiable risks to this species
DD	Data Deficient	Inadequate information to make an assessment of the risks to this species

== Order: Rodentia (rodents) ==
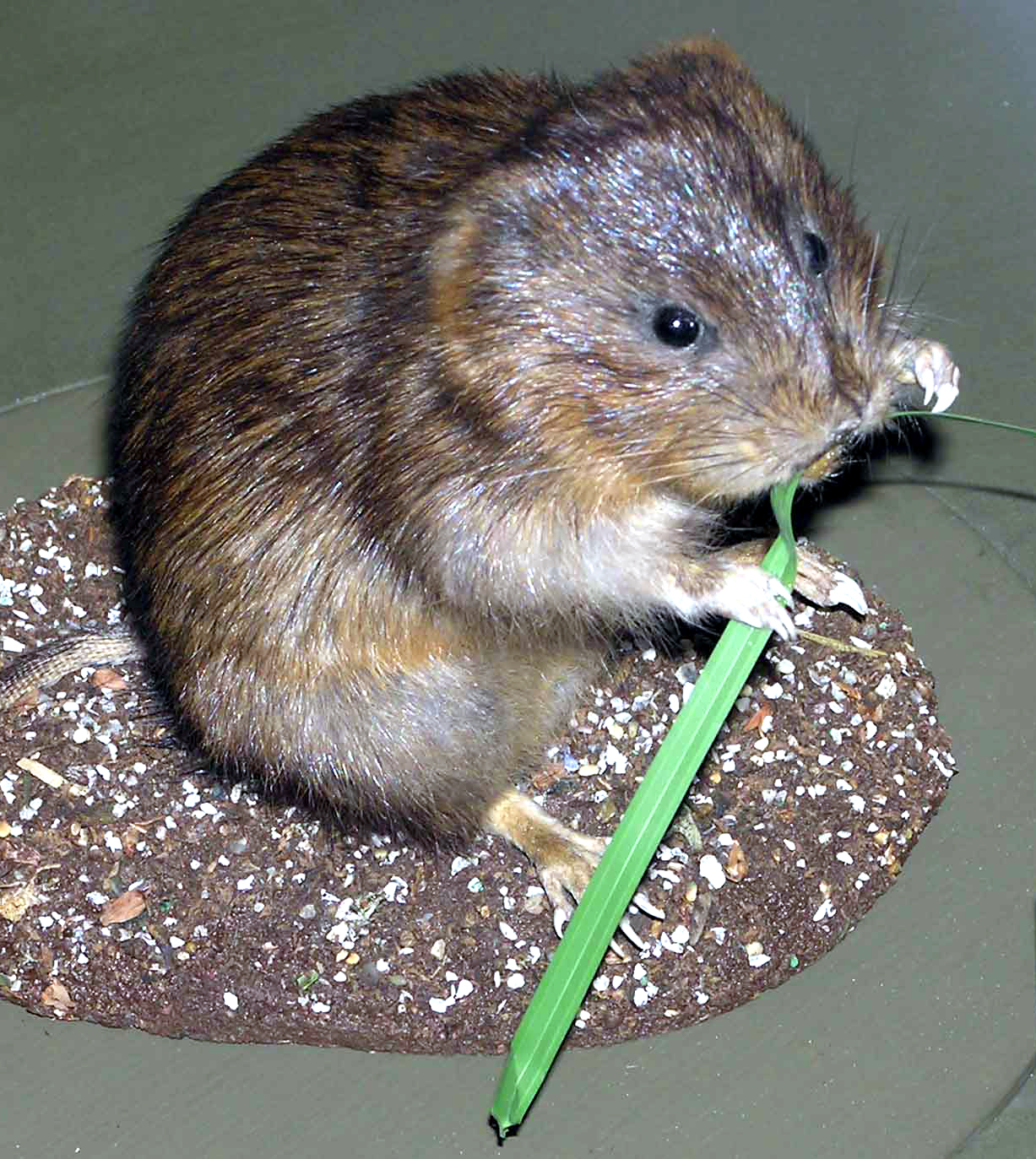
European water vole

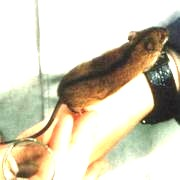
Striped field mouse

Rodents make up the largest order of mammals, with over 40% of mammalian species. They have two incisors in the upper and lower jaw which grow continually and must be kept short by gnawing.

- Suborder: Sciurognathi
  - Family: Sciuridae (squirrels)
    - Subfamily: Sciurinae
      - Tribe: Sciurini
        - Genus: Sciurus
          - Caucasian squirrel, S. anomalus LC
          - Red squirrel, S. vulgaris LC
    - Subfamily: Xerinae
      - Tribe: Marmotini
        - Genus: Spermophilus
          - European ground squirrel, Spermophilus citellus EN
  - Family: Gliridae (dormice)
    - Subfamily: Leithiinae
      - Genus: Dryomys
        - Forest dormouse, Dryomys nitedula LC
      - Genus: Muscardinus
        - Hazel dormouse, Muscardinus avellanarius LC
      - Genus: Myomimus
        - Roach's mouse-tailed dormouse, Myomimus roachi VU
    - Subfamily: Glirinae
      - Genus: Glis
        - European edible dormouse, Glis glis LC
  - Family: Spalacidae
    - Subfamily: Spalacinae
      - Genus: Nannospalax
        - Lesser blind mole-rat, Nannospalax leucodon LC
        - Anatolian blind mole-rat, Nannospalax xanthodon LC
  - Family: Cricetidae
    - Subfamily: Cricetinae
      - Genus: Cricetulus
        - Grey dwarf hamster, Nothocricetulus migratorius LC
    - Subfamily: Arvicolinae
      - Genus: Arvicola
        - European water vole, A. amphibius LC
      - Genus: Chionomys
        - European snow vole, Chionomys nivalis LC
      - Genus: Clethrionomys
        - Bank vole, Clethrionomys glareolus LC
      - Genus: Microtus
        - Felten's vole, Microtus felteni LC
        - Günther's vole, Microtus guentheri LC
        - European pine vole, Microtus subterraneus LC
        - East European vole, Microtus mystacinus LC
        - Thomas's pine vole, Microtus thomasi LC
  - Family: Muridae (mice, rats, voles, gerbils, hamsters, etc.)
    - Subfamily: Deomyinae
      - Genus: Acomys
        - Crete spiny mouse, Acomys minous DD
    - Subfamily: Murinae
      - Genus: Mus
        - House mouse, Mus musculus LC
        - Macedonian mouse, Mus macedonicus LC
        - Steppe mouse, Mus spicilegus LC
      - Genus: Micromys
        - Eurasian harvest mouse, Micromys minutus LC
      - Genus: Apodemus
        - Striped field mouse, Apodemus agrarius LC
        - Yellow-necked mouse, Apodemus flavicollis LC
        - Western broad-toothed field mouse, Apodemus epimelas LC
        - Broad-toothed field mouse, Apodemus mystacinus LC
        - Wood mouse, Apodemus sylvaticus LC
        - Steppe field mouse, Apodemus witherbyi LC
      - Genus: Rattus
        - Brown rat, R. norvegicus LC (introduced)
        - Black rat, R. rattus LC (introduced)

== Order: Lagomorpha (lagomorphs) ==
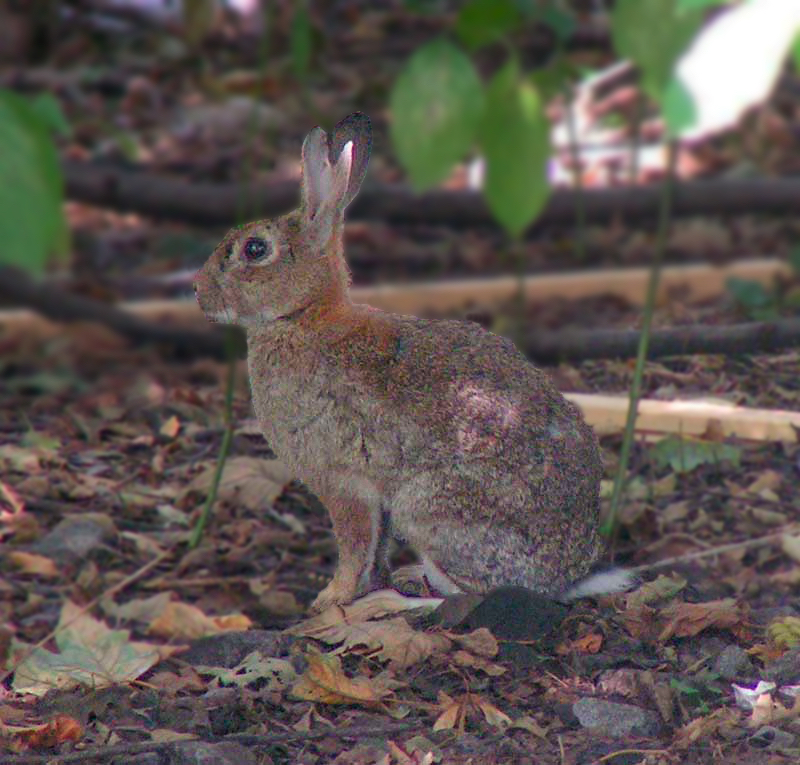
European rabbit

The lagomorphs comprise two families, Leporidae (hares and rabbits), and Ochotonidae (pikas). Though they can resemble rodents, and were classified as a superfamily in that order until the early 20th century, they have since been considered a separate order. They differ from rodents in a number of physical characteristics, such as having four incisors in the upper jaw rather than two.

- Family: Leporidae
  - Genus: Lepus
    - European hare, L. europaeus LC
  - Genus: Oryctolagus
    - European rabbit, O. cuniculus NT introduced

== Order: Eulipotyphla (hedgehogs, shrews and moles) ==
Hedgehogs are easily recognised by their spines, shrews closely resemble mice, and moles are stout-bodied burrowers.

- Family: Erinaceidae (hedgehogs)
  - Subfamily: Erinaceinae
    - Genus: Erinaceus
      - Northern white-breasted hedgehog, E. roumanicus LC
- Family: Soricidae (shrews)
  - Subfamily: Crocidurinae
    - Genus: Crocidura
      - Bicolored shrew, Crocidura leucodon LC
      - Güldenstädt's shrew, Croditura gueldenstaedtii LC
      - Cretan shrew, Crocidura zimmermanni EN
    - Genus: Suncus
      - Etruscan shrew, Suncus etruscus LC
  - Subfamily: Soricinae
    - Tribe: Nectogalini
      - Genus: Neomys
        - Southern water shrew, Neomys milleri LC
        - Eurasian water shrew, Neomys fodiens LC
    - Tribe: Soricini
      - Genus: Sorex
        - Common shrew, Sorex araneus LC
        - Eurasian pygmy shrew, Sorex minutus LC
- Family: Talpidae (moles)
  - Subfamily: Talpinae
    - Tribe: Talpini
      - Genus: Talpa
        - Mediterranean mole, Talpa caeca LC
        - European mole, Talpa europaea LC
        - Stankovic's mole, Talpa stankovici LC

== Order: Chiroptera (bats) ==
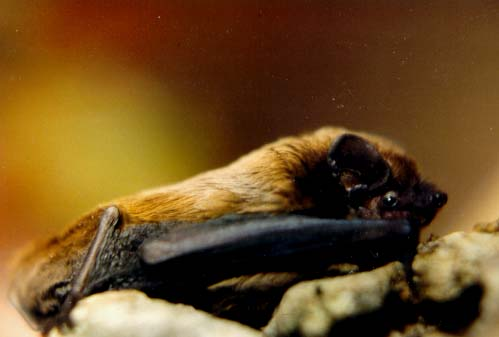
Lesser noctule

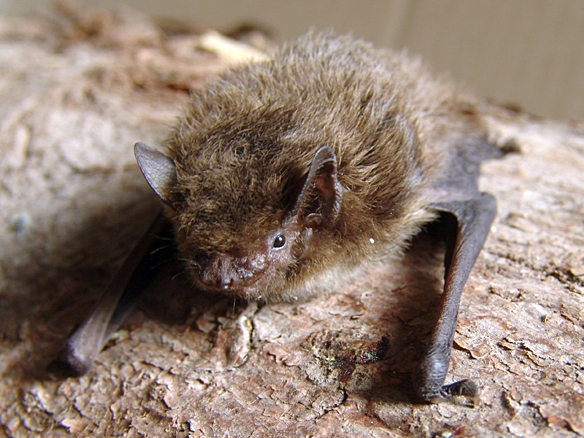
Nathusius' pipistrelle

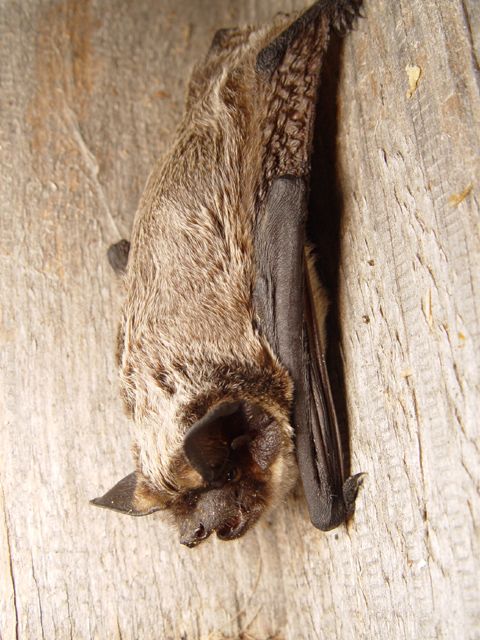
Parti-coloured bat

The bats' most distinguishing feature is that their forelimbs are developed as wings, making them the only mammals capable of flight. Bat species account for about 20% of all mammals.

- Family: Pteropodidae (flying foxes, Old World fruit bats)
  - Subfamily: Pteropodinae
    - Genus: Rousettus
      - Egyptian fruit bat, R. aegyptiacus LC
- Family: Vespertilionidae
  - Subfamily: Myotinae
    - Genus: Myotis
      - Alcathoe bat, M. alcathoe DD
      - Lesser mouse-eared bat, M. blythii LC
      - Bechstein's bat, M. bechsteinii NT
      - Brandt's bat, M. brandti LC
      - Daubenton's bat, M. daubentonii LC
      - Long-fingered bat, M. capaccinii VU
      - Geoffroy's bat, M. emarginatus LC
      - Greater mouse-eared bat, M. myotis LC
      - Whiskered bat, M. mystacinus LC
      - Natterer's bat, M. nattereri LC
  - Subfamily: Vespertilioninae
    - Genus: Barbastella
      - Western barbastelle, B. barbastellus NT
    - Genus: Eptesicus
      - Anatolian serotine bat, E. anatolicus LC
      - Serotine bat, E. serotinus LC
    - Genus: Hypsugo
      - Savi's pipistrelle, H. savii LC
    - Genus: Nyctalus
      - Greater noctule bat, N. lasiopterus VU
      - Lesser noctule, N. leisleri LC
      - Common noctule, N. noctula LC
    - Genus: Pipistrellus
      - Nathusius' pipistrelle, P. nathusii LC
      - Common pipistrelle, P. pipistrellus LC
      - Kuhl's pipistrelle, P. kuhlii LC
      - Soprano pipistrelle, P. pygmaeus LC
      - Hanak's pipistrelle, P. hanaki VU
    - Genus: Plecotus
      - Alpine long-eared bat, P. macrobullaris LC
      - Brown long-eared bat, P. auritus LC
      - Grey long-eared bat, P. austriacus NT
      - Mediterranean long-eared bat, P. kolombatovici LC
    - Genus: Vespertilio
      - Parti-coloured bat, V. murinus LC
  - Subfamily: Miniopterinae
    - Genus: Miniopterus
      - Common bent-wing bat, M. schreibersii VU
- Family: Molossidae
  - Genus: Tadarida
    - European free-tailed bat, T. teniotis LC
- Family: Nycteridae
  - Genus: Nycteris
    - Egyptian slit-faced bat, N. thebaica LC
- Family: Rhinolophidae
  - Subfamily: Rhinolophinae
    - Genus: Rhinolophus
      - Blasius's horseshoe bat, R. blasii LC
      - Mediterranean horseshoe bat, R. euryale NT
      - Greater horseshoe bat, R. ferrumequinum LC
      - Lesser horseshoe bat, R. hipposideros LC
      - Mehely's horseshoe bat, R. mehelyi VU

== Order: Cetacea (whales) ==
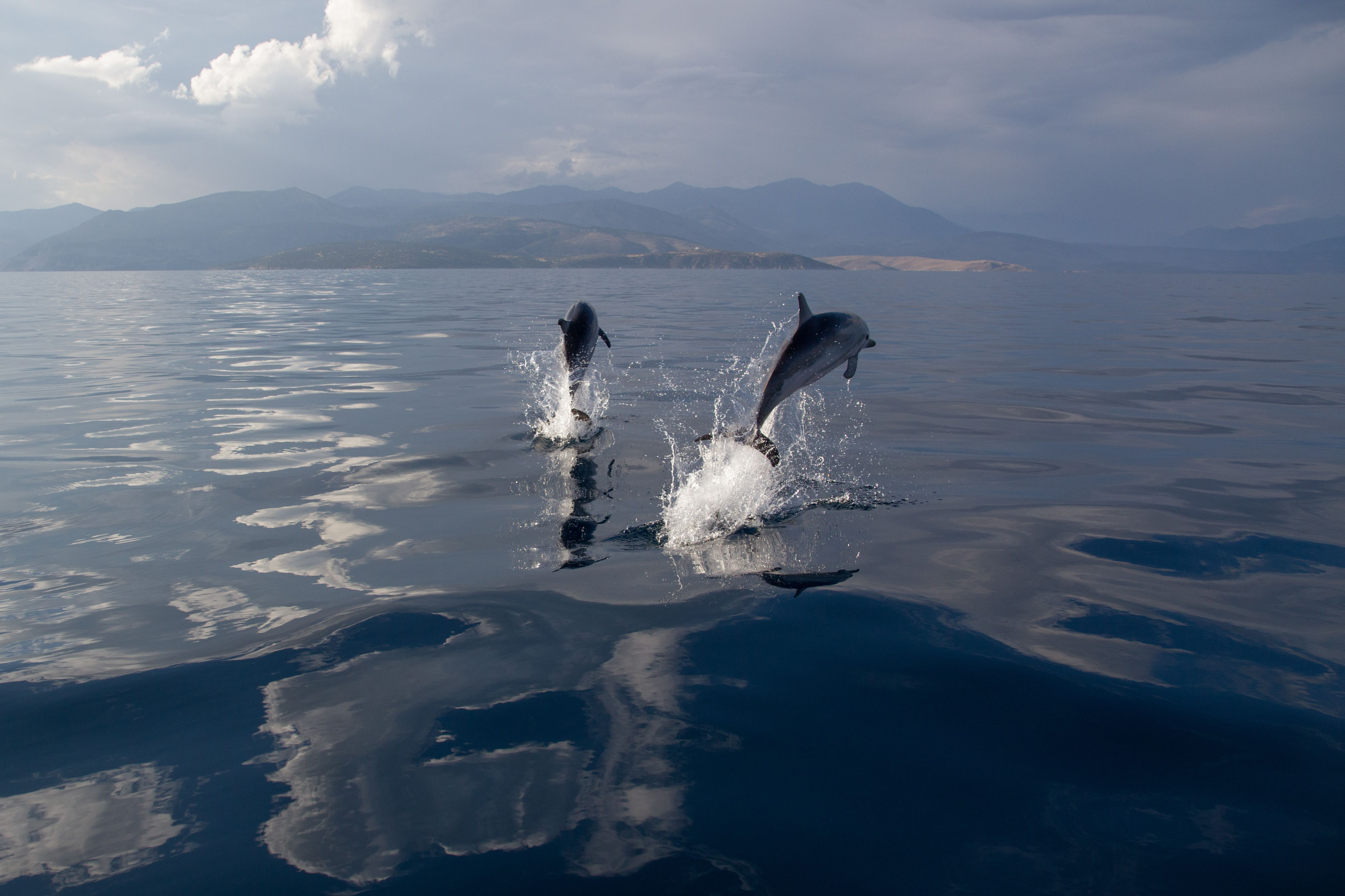
Striped dolphins in Gulf of Corinth

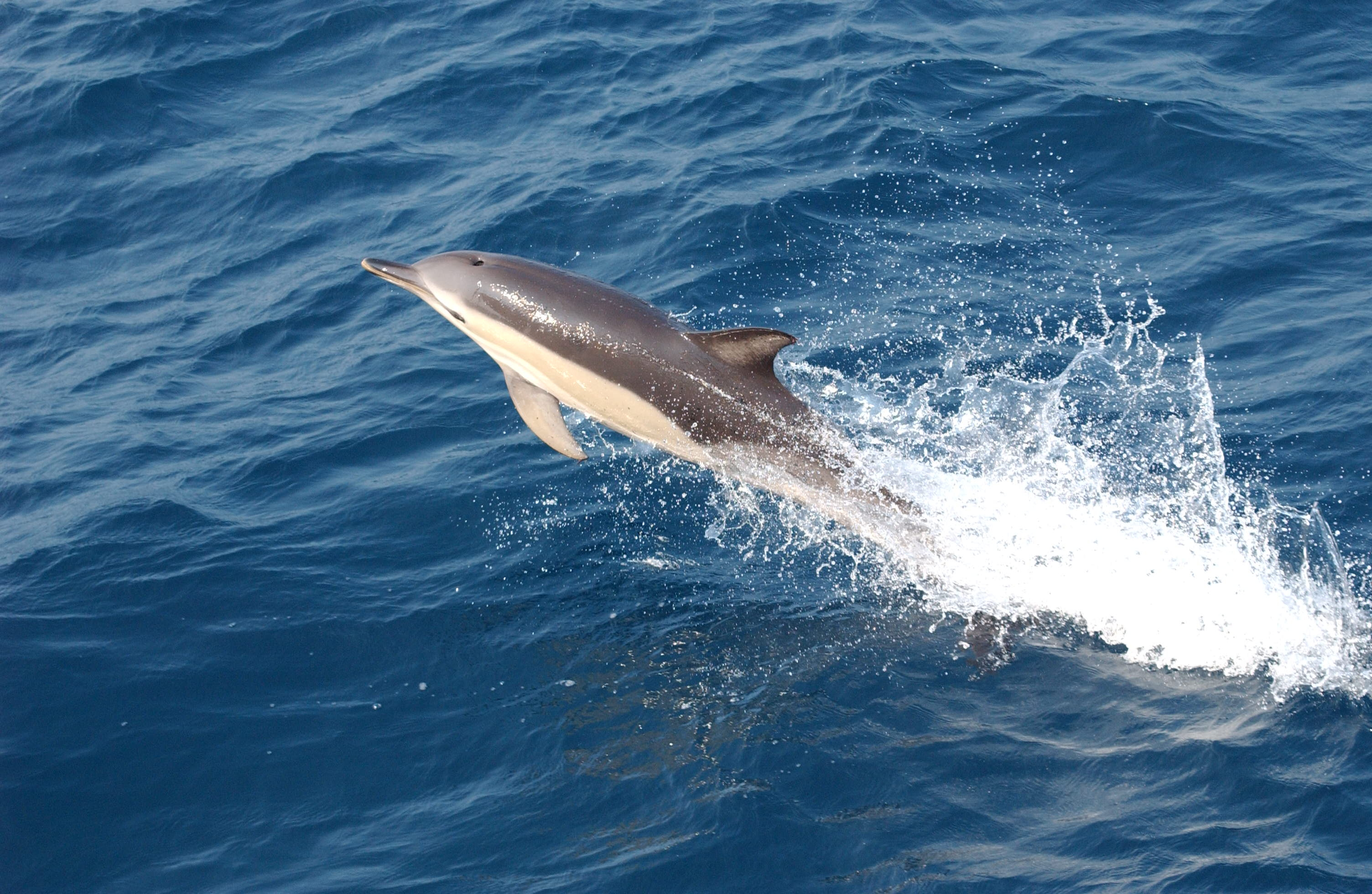
Common dolphin

The order Cetacea includes whales, dolphins and porpoises. They are the mammals most fully adapted to aquatic life with a spindle-shaped nearly hairless body, protected by a thick layer of blubber, and forelimbs and tail modified to provide propulsion underwater. Dolphins are national animal of Greece although cetacean biodiversity in the Mediterranean is not as diverse as in nations facing outer oceans, and the Aegean Sea Greece's coasts are one of the furthermost basin of the inland sea and even less species regularly inhabit comparing to western basin.

- Suborder: Mysticeti
  - Family: Balaenopteridae (rorquals)
    - Genus: Balaenoptera
      - Common minke whale, B. acutorostrata LC
      - Fin whale, Balaenoptera physalus VU
- Suborder: Odontoceti
  - Family: Physeteridae (sperm whales)
    - Genus: Physeter
      - Sperm whale, Physeter macrocephalus VU
  - Family: Ziphiidae (beaked whales)
    - Genus: Ziphius
      - Cuvier's beaked whale, Ziphius cavirostris LC
    - Genus: Mesoplodon
      - Sowerby's beaked whale, Mesoplodon bidens LC
  - Superfamily: Platanistoidea
    - Family: Phocoenidae (porpoises)
      - Genus: Phocoena
        - Harbour porpoise, Phocoena phocoena LC
          - Black Sea harbour porpoise, P. p. relicta EN
    - Family: Delphinidae (marine dolphins)
      - Genus: Tursiops
        - Common bottlenose dolphin, Tursiops truncatus LC
      - Genus: Steno
        - Rough-toothed dolphin, Steno bredanensis LC
      - Genus: Stenella
        - Striped dolphin, Stenella coeruleoalba LC
      - Genus: Delphinus
        - Short-beaked common dolphin, Delphinus delphis LC
      - Genus: Grampus
        - Risso's dolphin, Grampus griseus LC
      - Genus: Pseudorca
        - False killer whale, Pseudorca crassidens NT

== Order: Carnivora (carnivorans) ==
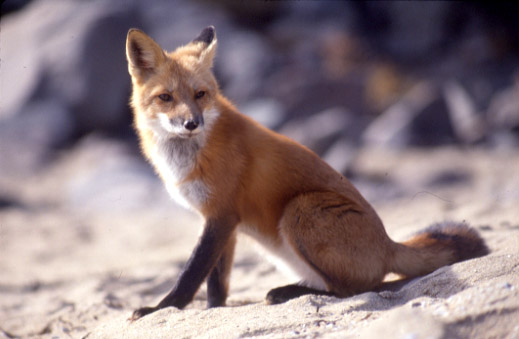
Red fox

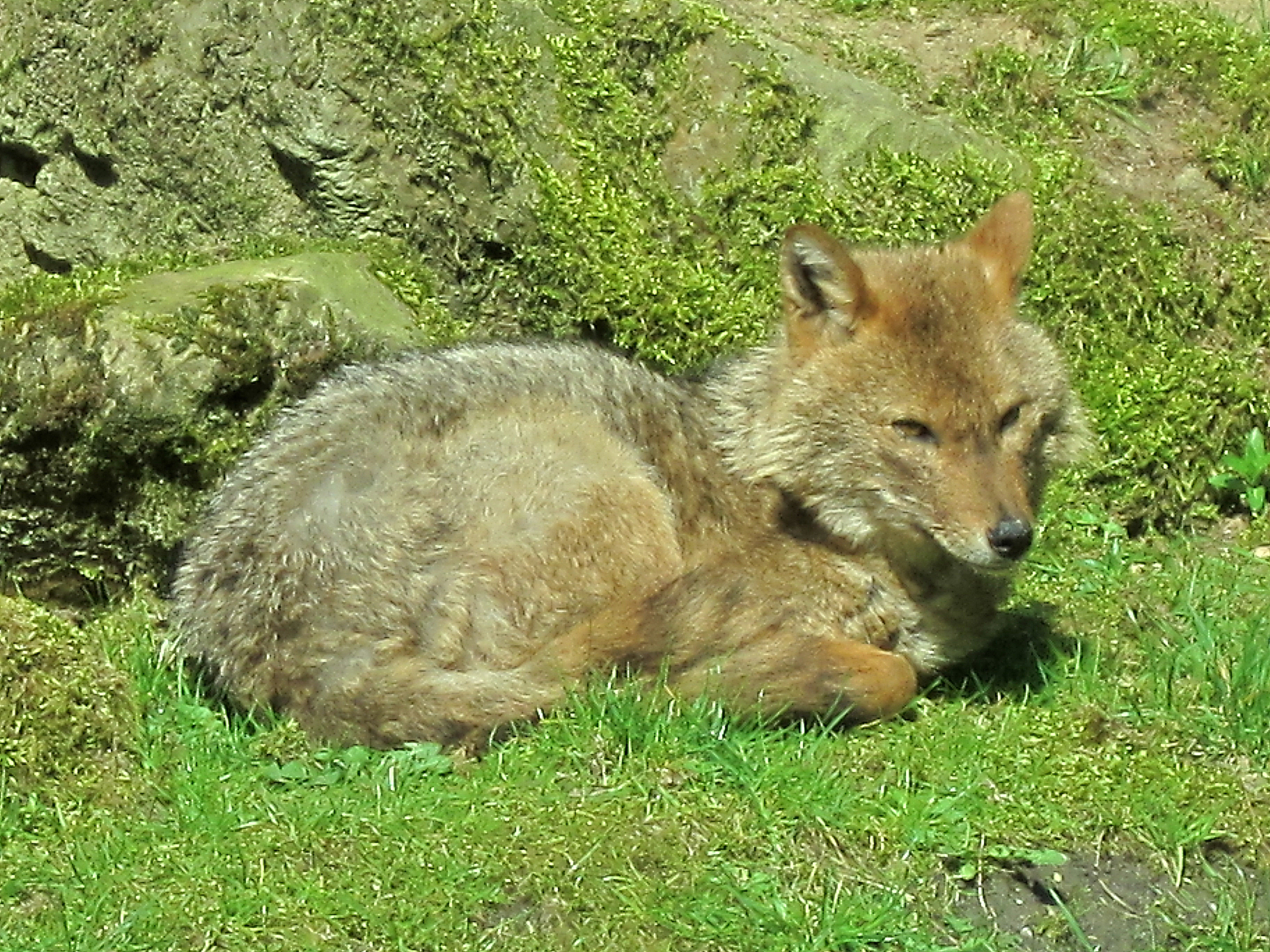
European jackal, a subspecies of golden jackal

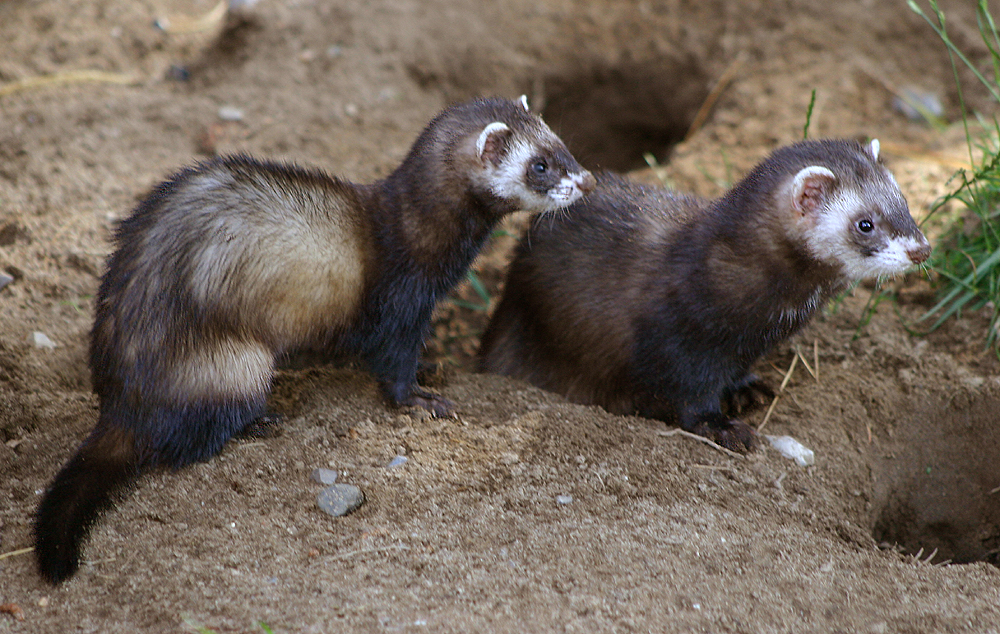
European polecat

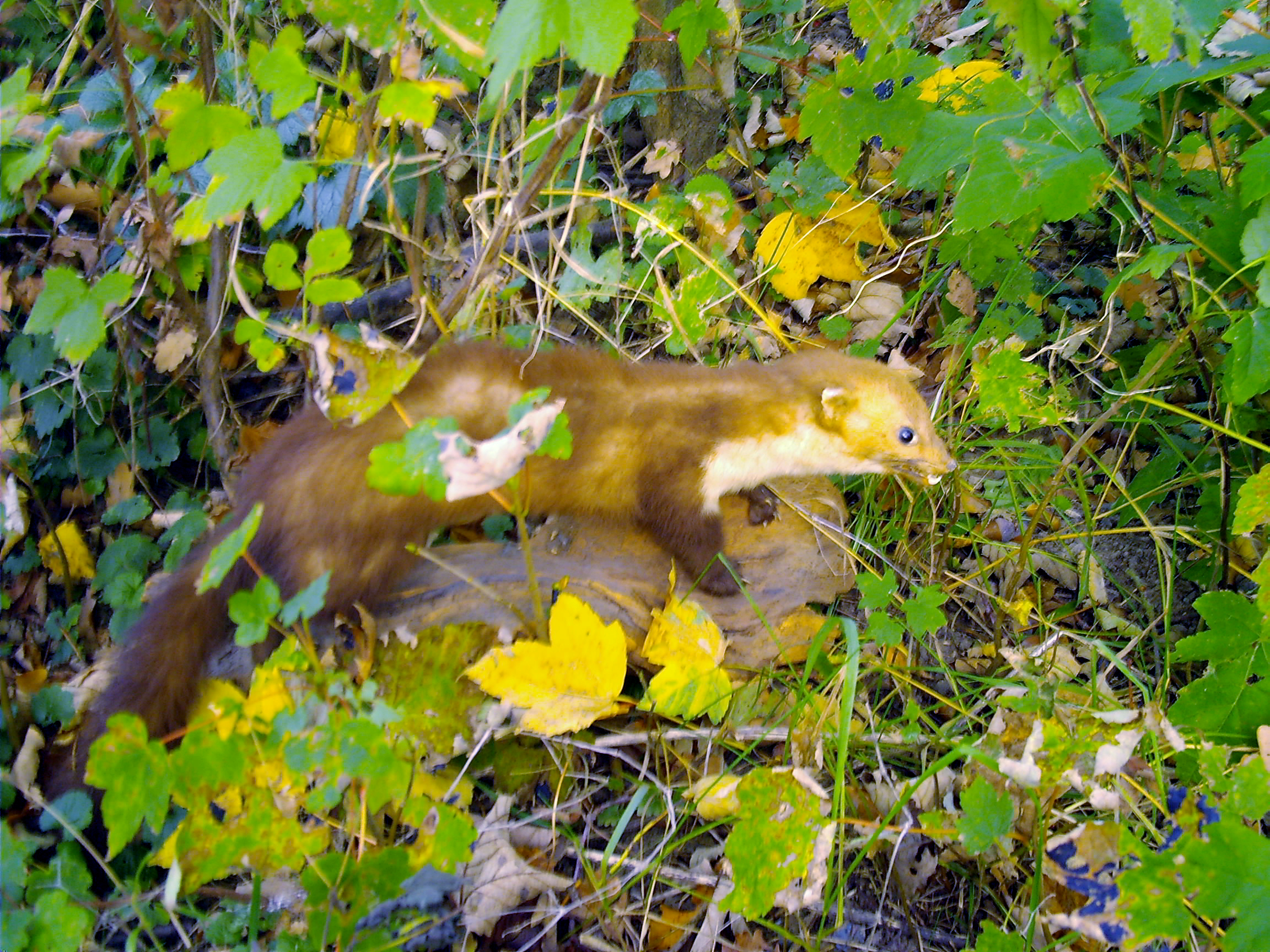
Beech marten

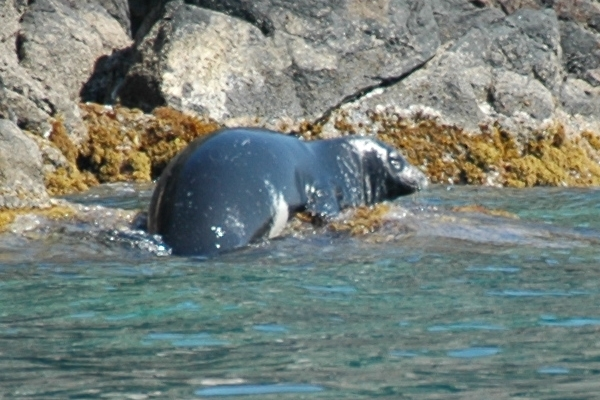
Mediterranean monk seal on rocky shore at Serifos

There are over 260 carnivore species, the majority of which feed primarily on meat. They have a characteristic skull shape and dentition.

- Suborder: Feliformia
  - Family: Felidae
    - Subfamily: Felinae
      - Genus: Felis
        - European wildcat, F. silvestris LC
      - Genus: Lynx
        - Eurasian lynx, L. lynx LC
- Suborder: Caniformia
  - Family: Canidae
    - Genus: Canis
      - Golden jackal, C. aureus LC
        - European jackal, C. a. moreoticus
      - Wolf, C. lupus LC
        - Eurasian wolf, C. l. lupus
    - Genus: Vulpes
      - Red fox, V. vulpes LC
  - Family: Ursidae
    - Genus: Ursus
      - Brown bear, U. arctos LC
        - Eurasian brown bear, U. a. arctos
  - Family: Mustelidae
    - Genus: Lutra
      - European otter, L. lutra NT
    - Genus: Martes
      - Beech marten, M. foina LC
      - European pine marten, M. martes LC
    - Genus: Meles
      - Caucasian badger, M. canescens NE
      - Eurasian badger, M. meles LC
    - Genus: Mustela
      - Least weasel, M. nivalis LC
      - European polecat, M. putorius LC
    - Genus: Neogale
      - American mink, N. vison LC introduced
    - Genus: Vormela
      - Marbled polecat, V. peregusna VU
  - Family: Phocidae
    - Genus: Monachus
      - Mediterranean monk seal, M. monachus VU

== Order: Artiodactyla (even-toed ungulates) ==
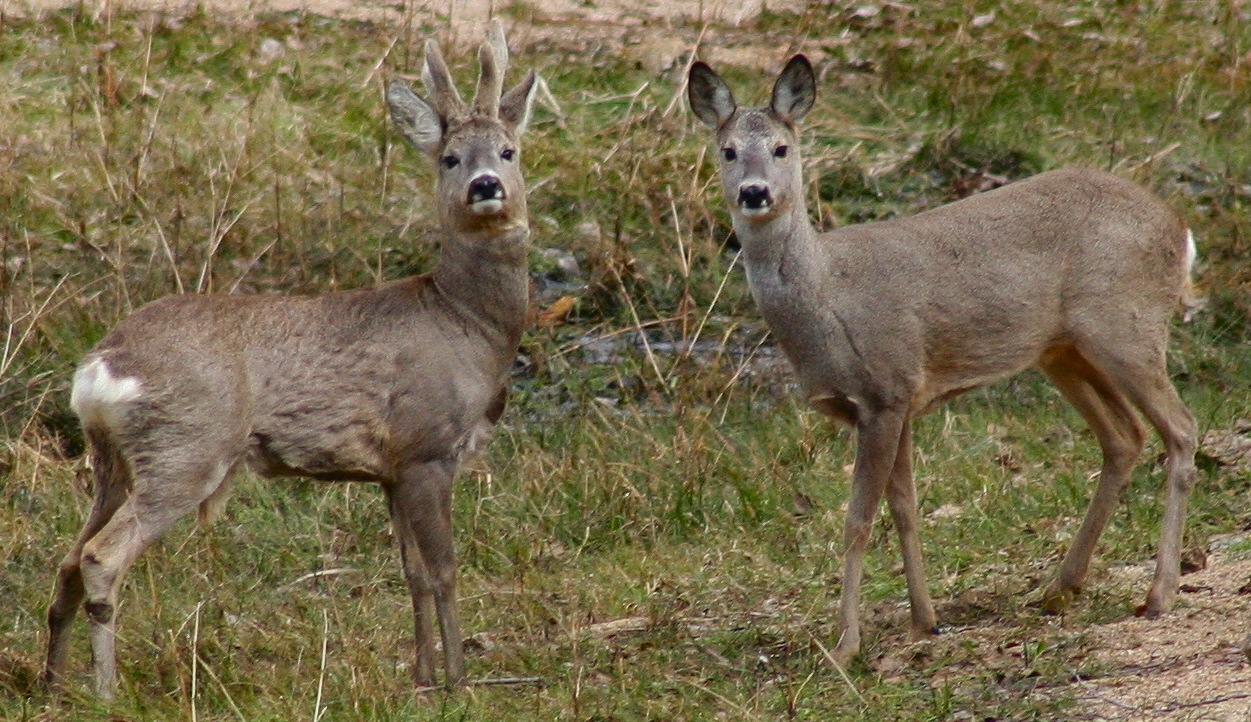
Roe deer

The even-toed ungulates are ungulates whose weight is borne about equally by the third and fourth toes, rather than mostly or entirely by the third as in perissodactyls. There are about 220 artiodactyl species, including many that are of great economic importance to humans.

- Family: Cervidae (deer)
  - Subfamily: Cervinae
    - Genus: Cervus
      - Red deer, C. elaphus LC
    - Genus: Dama
      - European fallow deer, D. dama LC
  - Subfamily: Capreolinae
    - Genus: Capreolus
      - Roe deer, C. capreolus LC
- Family: Bovidae (cattle, antelope, sheep, goats)
  - Subfamily: Caprinae
    - Genus: Rupicapra
      - Chamois, R. rupicapra LC
- Family: Suidae (pigs)
  - Subfamily: Suinae
    - Genus: Sus
      - Wild boar, S. scrofa LC

== See also ==
- List of reptiles of Greece
- List of amphibians of Greece
- List of birds of Greece
- Lists of mammals by region
- List of prehistoric mammals
- Mammal classification
