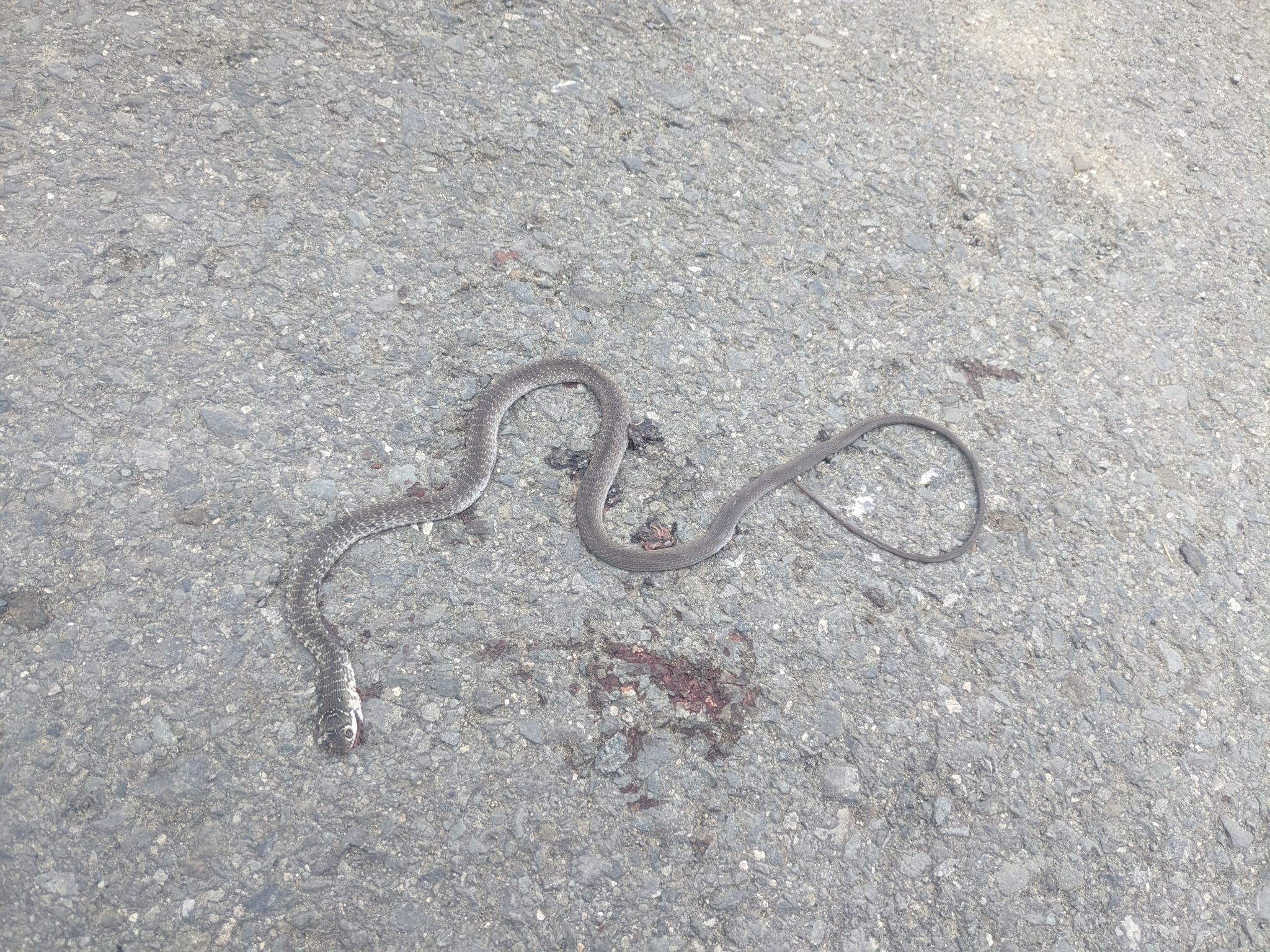
- Roadkill

Conservation status
- Near Threatened (IUCN 3.1)

Scientific classification
- Kingdom: Animalia
- Phylum: Chordata
- Class: Reptilia
- Order: Squamata
- Suborder: Serpentes
- Family: Colubridae
- Genus: Hierophis
- Species: H. cypriensis

Binomial name
- Hierophis cypriensis (Schätti, 1985)

Synonyms
- Coluber cypriensis; Dolichophis cypriensis

= Cyprus whip snake =

Species of snake

The Cyprus whip snake (Hierophis cypriensis) is a species of snake in the family Colubridae. It is endemic to Cyprus. It is not a large snake and normally grows to lengths of 70 to 90 cm. The body can be black, grey-brown, or olive-green, with a pale yellow, dirty grey, or cream belly. The top of the head is dark with small pale markings and two vertical white lines in front of and behind the eye. The front half of the body has thin white crosswise stripes that disappear towards the back, while the last third of the body and the tail are solidly dark. It is found widely in the Troodos Mountains and their foothills, most commonly at elevations of between 700 and 800 metres. It prefers cool, humid microhabitats in areas with dense scrub, bushes, or forest, especially along streams or rivers.

The whip snake eats small animals like lizards, amphibians, insects, and other snakes. It is thought to reproduce by laying eggs. It is listed as being near-threatened on the IUCN Red List. It has a fairly restricted range which is declining in size and habitat quality. Despite being found widely in its range, it is not a common species and is said to be becoming "increasingly endangered", with a declining population. Threats to the species include water pollution caused by the spraying of pesticide, logging, road construction, and persecution by humans.

== Taxonomy ==
The Cyprus whip snake has no subspecies.

== Description ==
It is not a large snake, normally growing to lengths of 70 to 90 cm, with a maximum recorded length of 116.5 cm. It is an elegant and slim snake with a distinct, elongated head. The body can be black, grey-brown, or olive-green, with a pale yellow, dirty grey, or cream belly. The top of the head is dark with small pale markings and two vertical white lines in front of and behind the eye. The front half of the body has thin white crosswise stripes that disappear towards the back, while the last third of the body and the tail are solidly dark. Older snakes are entirely dark with a few remnant pale markings. The eyes are large and the pupils have golden or orange edges.

== Distribution and habitat ==
The Cyprus whip snake is endemic to Cyprus, where it is found widely in the Troodos Mountains, including the foothills. It has been found at elevations of 50 to 1800 metres above sea level, with most records being from between 700 and 800 metres. Reports of the species from lowlands are thought to be misidentifications. The species is probably restricted to the Troodos, although some small populations may also occur in the Kyrenia Mountains. It prefers cool, humid microhabitats in areas with dense scrub, bushes, or forest, especially along streams or rivers. The species' preference for streams is due to Cyprus's generally arid habitat. Other habitats the species has been recorded in are grassland near roads road and very dry habitat with phrygana scrub and scattered pine trees.

== Ecology ==
The whip snake eats small animals like lizards, amphibians, insects, and other snakes. It is thought to reproduce by laying eggs.

== Conservation ==
The Cyprus whip snake is listed as being near-threatened on the IUCN Red List. It has a fairly restricted range which is declining in size and habitat quality. Despite being found widely in its range, it is not a common species and is said to be becoming "increasingly endangered", with a declining population. Threats to the species include water pollution caused by the spraying of pesticide, logging, road construction, and persecution by humans. The species forages on asphalt surfaces and may be vulnerable to becoming roadkill, although no systematic data exists to support this assumption.

It is listed in Annex II of the Bern Convention and Annex II and IV of the EU Habitats Directive. It occurs in many protected areas and has been the target of some conservation measures to protect the species.
