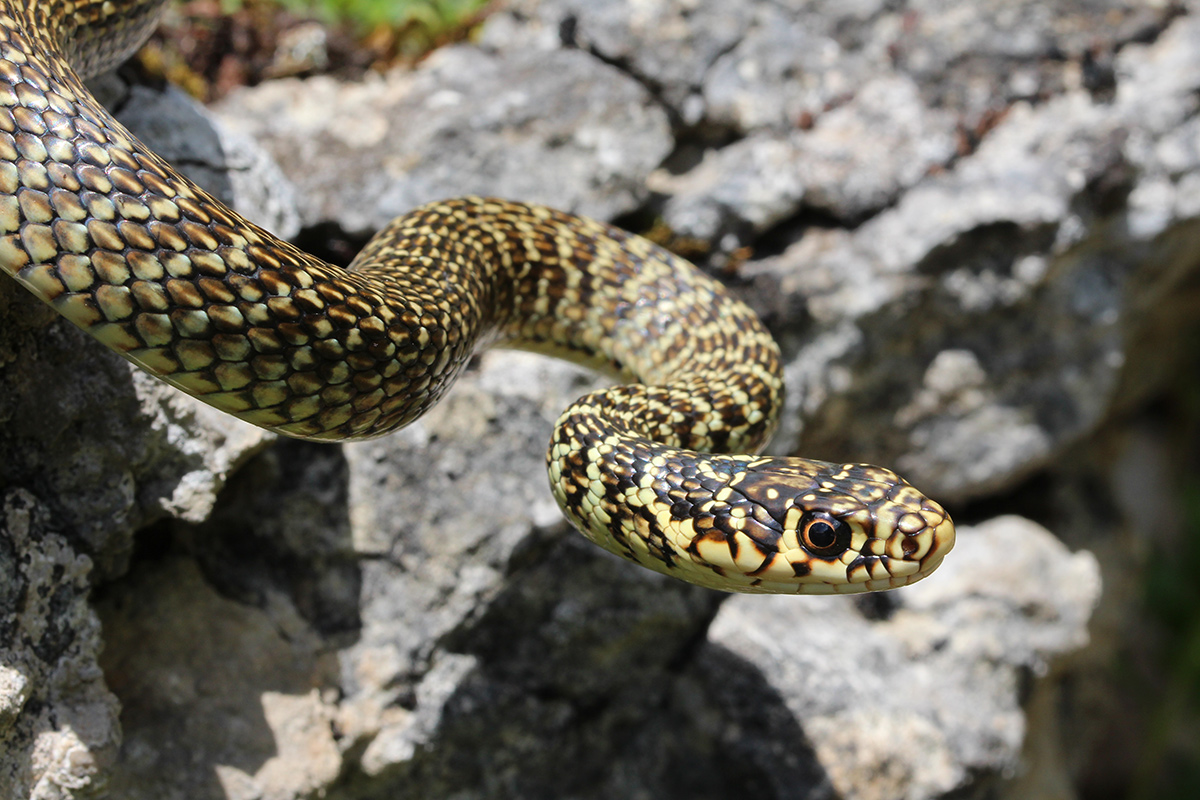
- H. v. viridiflavus
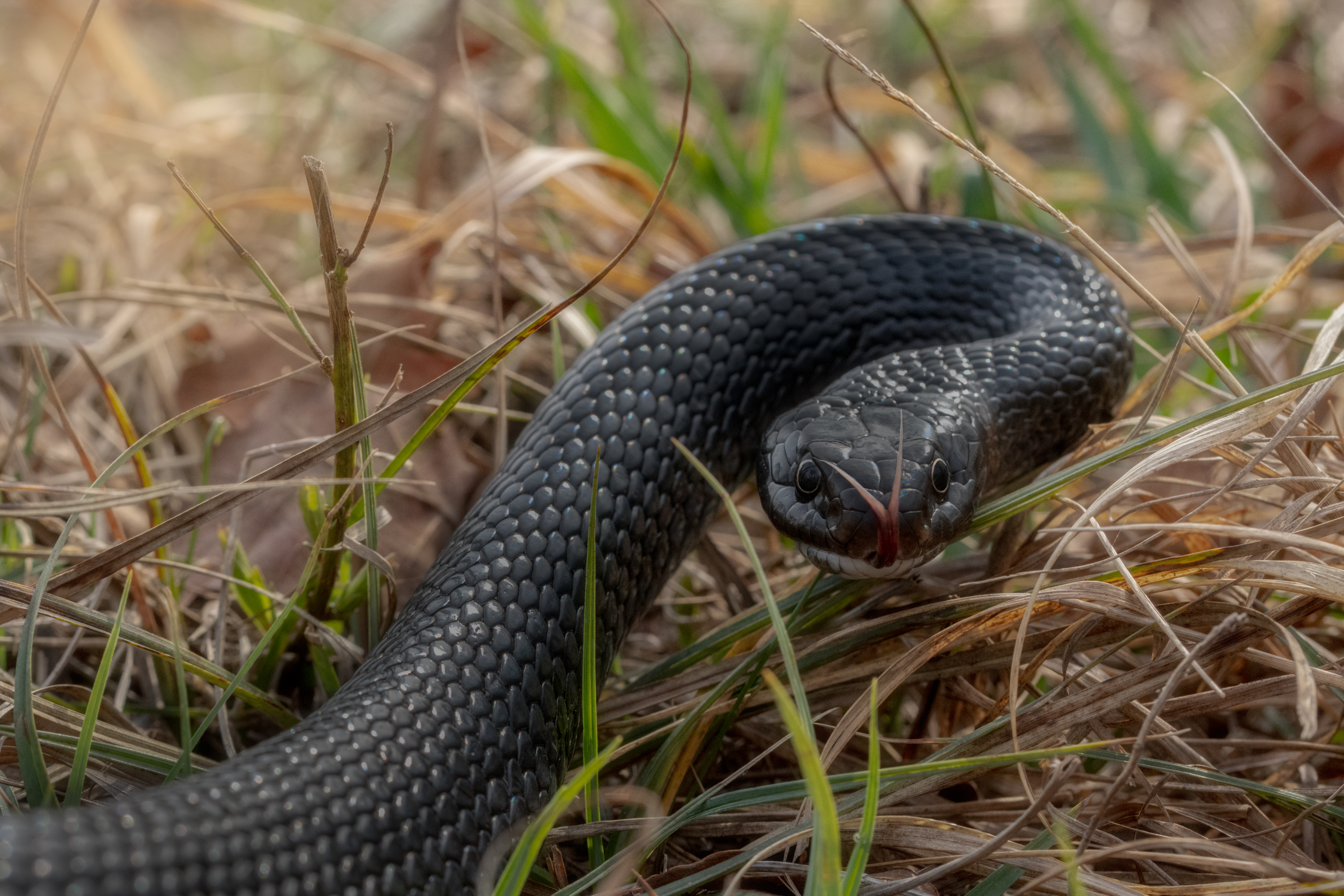
- H. v. carbonarius

Conservation status
- Least Concern (IUCN 3.1)

Scientific classification
- Kingdom: Animalia
- Phylum: Chordata
- Class: Reptilia
- Order: Squamata
- Suborder: Serpentes
- Family: Colubridae
- Genus: Hierophis
- Species: H. viridiflavus

Binomial name
- Hierophis viridiflavus (Lacépède, 1789)

Synonyms
- Coluber gyarosensis Mertens, 1968; Hierophis gyarosensis (Mertens, 1968)

= Green whip snake =

Species of snake

The green whip snake or western whip snake (Hierophis viridiflavus) is a species of snake in the family Colubridae.

== Geographic range and subspecies ==
This species is present in Andorra, Croatia, France, Greece, Italy, Malta, Slovenia, Spain, Switzerland, and possibly Luxembourg.

Currently two subspecies are distinguished, a melanic (H. v. carbonarius) and a striped form (H. v. viridiflavus). The melanic form occurs in the eastern part of the range and the striped in the western part, with a contact zone throughout most of northern Italy.

== Habitat ==
Its natural habitats are temperate forests, temperate shrubland, Mediterranean-type shrubby vegetation, arable land, pastureland, plantations, rural gardens, and urban areas.

== Description ==
The green whip snake is a slender species with a small but well-defined head, prominent eyes with circular pupils, and smooth scales. The background colour is greenish-yellow but this is mostly obscured by heavy, somewhat irregular bands of dark green or black, particularly in the front half of the snake. The underparts are grey or yellowish and the tail has narrow longitudinal stripes. The young are a greyish colour and develop their full adult colouring by about their fourth year. This snake grows to a total length of about 150 cm (60 in). In the northeastern part of its range, in Sicily and southern Italy, most individuals are blackish in colour. There is a larger, up to two metres (6.5 ft) long, often pure black variant – Coluber viridiflavus carbonarius (Bonaparte, 1833) – found in Italy and Malta. referred to there as 'Il Biacco'.

== Status ==
The green whip snake has a wide distribution and is very common within that range. The population is steady and faces no significant threats, apart from road kill and persecution, and the International Union for Conservation of Nature has assessed its conservation status as being of "least concern".

== Biology ==
These snakes mainly feed on lizards, skinks, frogs, mice, as well as on the young and eggs of small birds. This species lays four to 15 eggs. They are very lively and when cornered, may bite furiously. They hibernate in winter.

== Venom ==
Commonly regarded as non-venomous, it is described that a subject who endured 'sustained biting' of up to 5 minutes began showing suspect symptoms, including problems with neuromotor skills. The presence of modified rear maxillary fangs in correspondence to a gland called the Duvernoy's gland, similar to the venom gland and involved in the production of toxins, has recently been discovered.

== Images ==
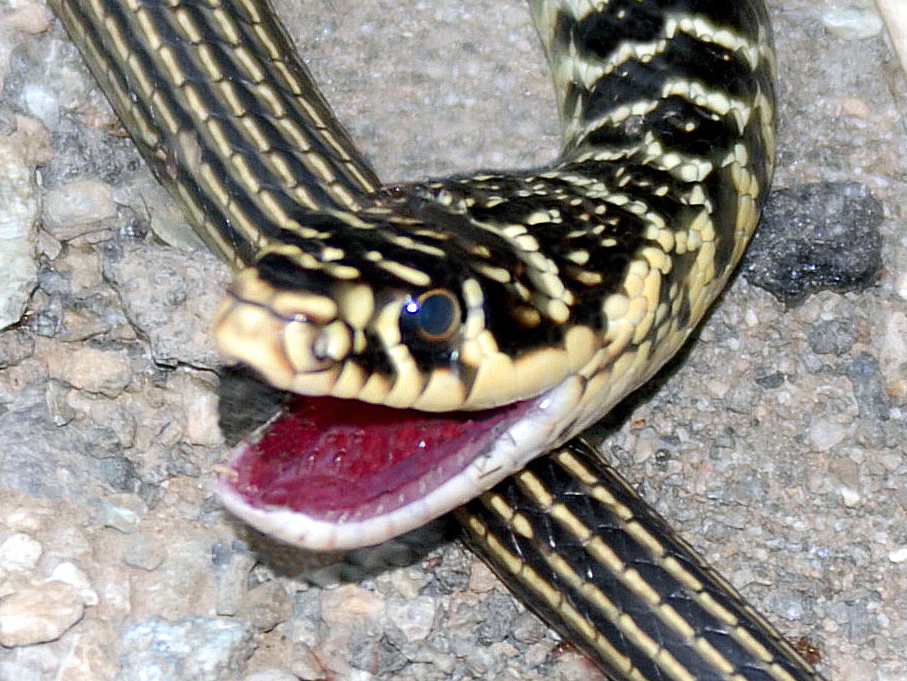
Close-up of the head

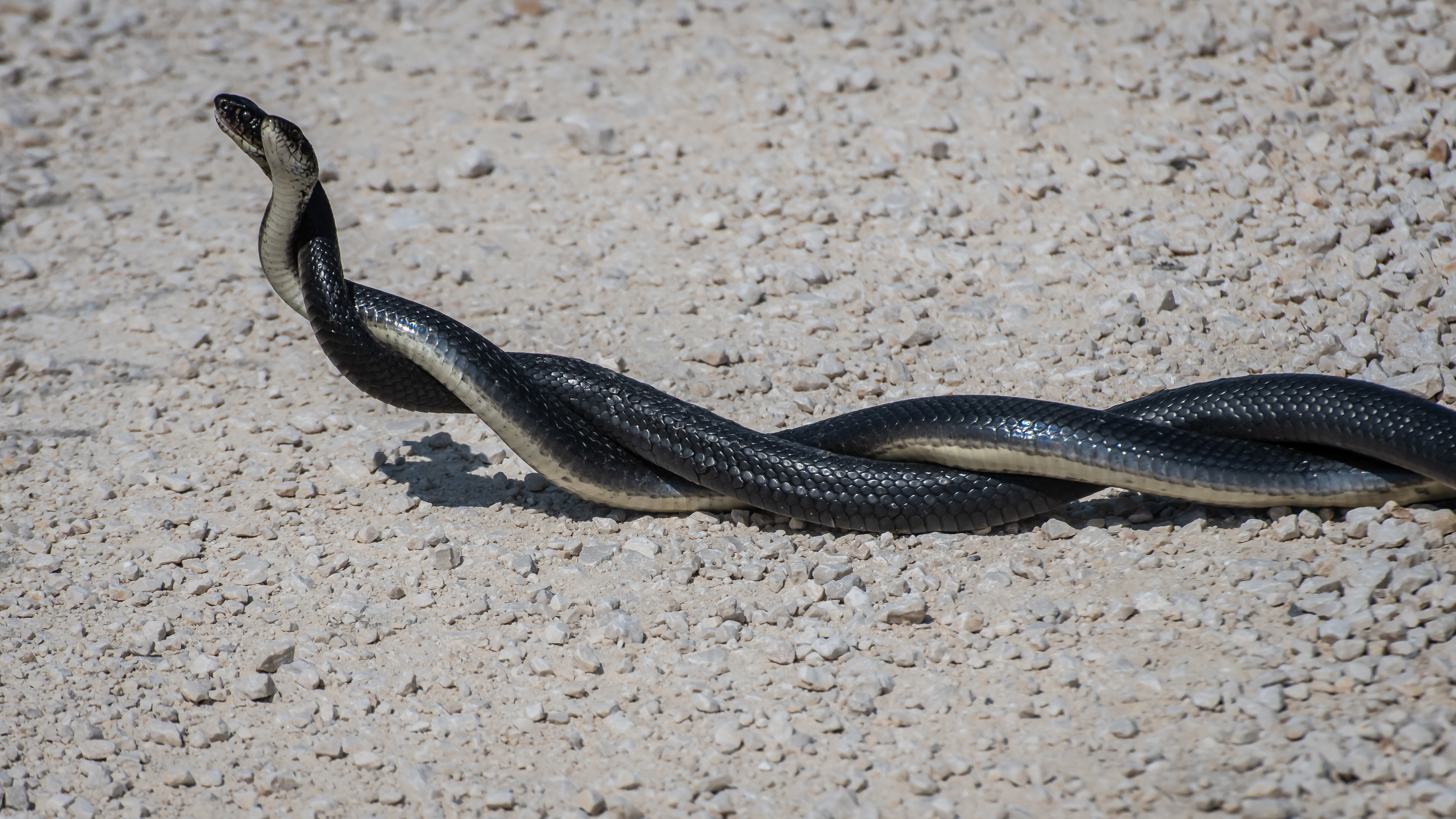
Copula of the carbonarius subspecies

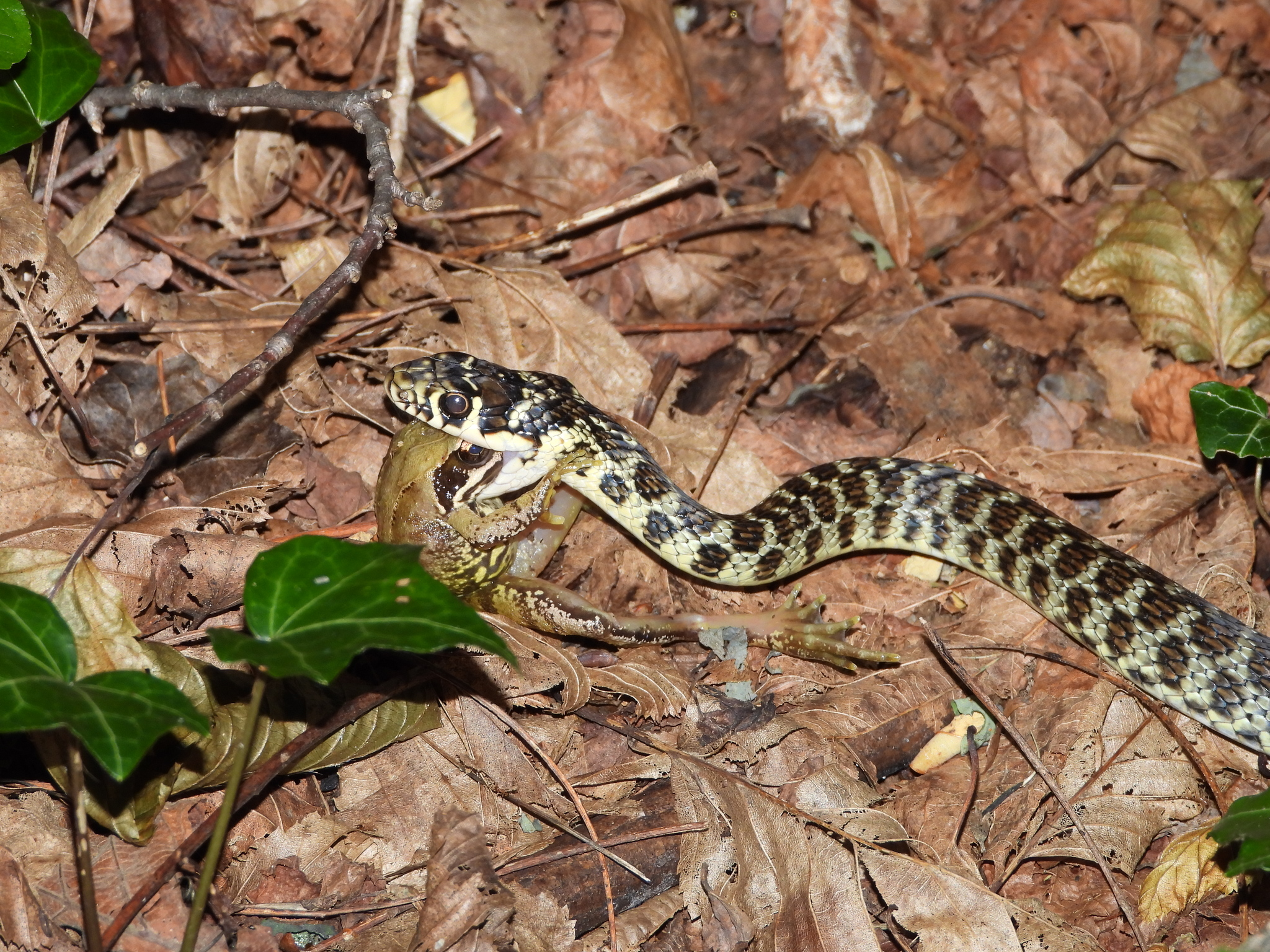
Juvenile eating a European common frog

== See also ==
- List of reptiles of Italy
