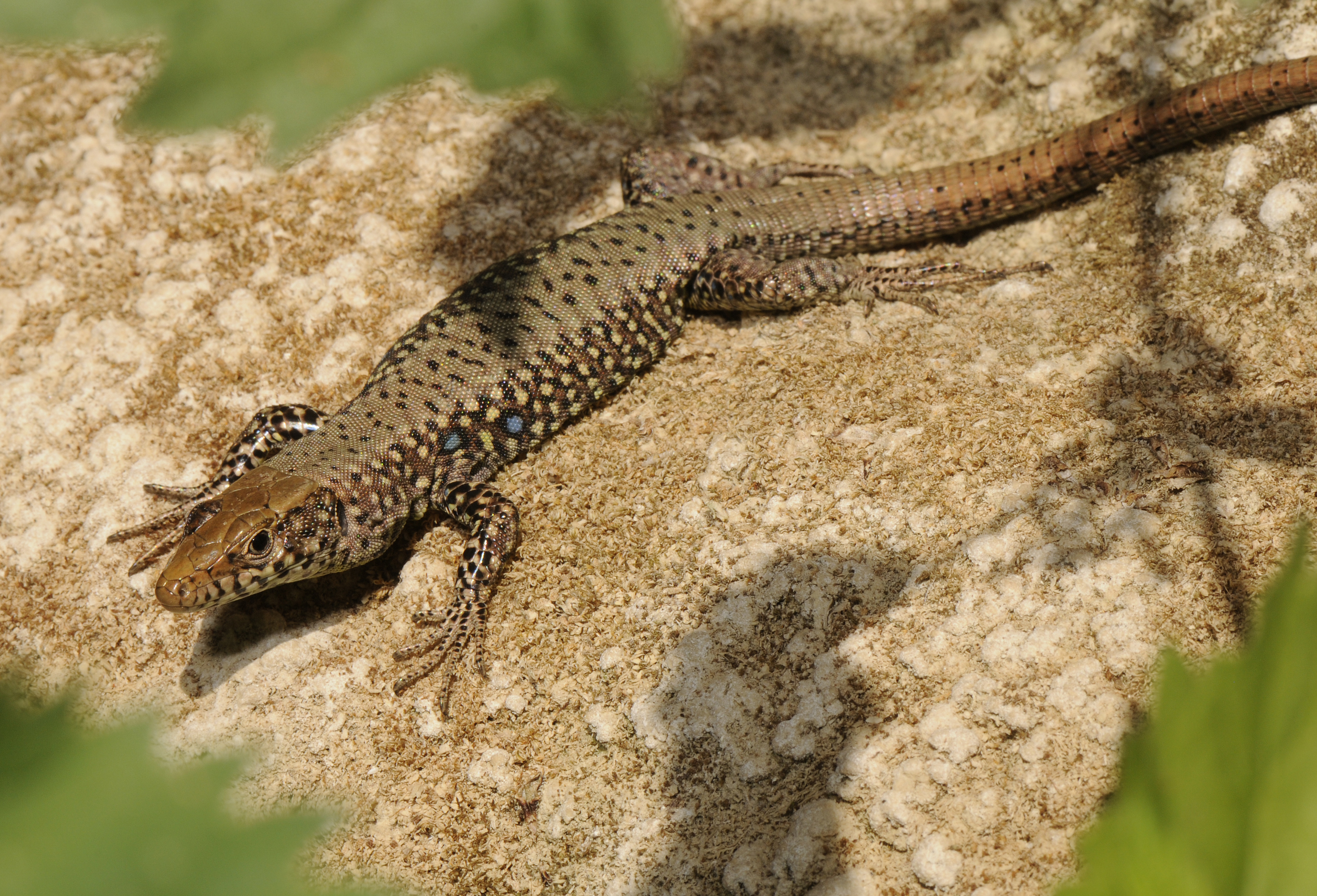

Conservation status
- Least Concern (IUCN 3.1)

Scientific classification
- Kingdom: Animalia
- Phylum: Chordata
- Class: Reptilia
- Order: Squamata
- Family: Lacertidae
- Genus: Hellenolacerta; Arnold, Arribas & Carranza, 2007
- Species: H. graeca

Binomial name
- Hellenolacerta graeca Bedriaga, 1886

Synonyms
- Lacerta graeca

= Greek rock lizard =

Species of lizard

The Greek rock lizard (Hellenolacerta graeca) is a species of lizard in the family Lacertidae. Endemic to Greece, its natural habitats are temperate forests, Mediterranean-type shrubby vegetation, rocky areas, and pastureland. It is threatened by habitat loss.The International Union for Conservation of Nature has listed it as being "near threatened".

== Description ==
The Greek rock lizard is a medium-sized species growing to a snout-to-vent length of about 8 cm (3 in) with a tail at least twice as long as this. The body is somewhat flattened and the legs are relatively long and slender. The colour is usually a glossy greyish-brown but may be more yellowish-brown, sometimes with a faint reddish tinge. Males have irregular dark spots on the back and dark flanks with many small pale spots. Females have smaller heads, fewer dark spots on the back and the pale spots on the flanks are more diffuse. Sometimes there are one or two blue spots above the shoulder; in males, these may extend a short way along the flanks. The underparts are yellow or orange and are usually speckled with fine dark markings, especially on the throat.

== Distribution and habitat ==
The Greek rock lizard is endemic to southern Greece where it is found only in the Peloponnese region, at altitudes of up to 1,600 metres (5,200 ft) above sea level but usually within the range 300 to 700 metres (980 to 2,300 ft). It is typically found near streams and pools, in light woodland, at the edge of fields bordering woodland and in shady areas of rock or scree.(rocky habitats with sufficient humidity).

== Behaviour ==
The Greek rock lizard is an agile species and climbs on rocks, walls, parapets and tree trunks but avoids prolonged periods in the full sun. Although it is mainly a climber, it does sometimes forage on the ground. The female lays a single clutch of up to six eggs, in a crevice or concealed place, and the eggs take about six weeks to hatch. When the lizard gets angry, it will in some cases spit acid at other animals that annoy it.

== Status ==
The chief threats faced by the Greek rock lizard are fires and the planting of Eucalyptus trees in place of the natural vegetation of the region. Although the lizard is quite common in places, its total area of occupancy is only around 20,000 square kilometres (7,700 sq mi) and as the amount of suitable habitat is reduced, its numbers are decreasing. The International Union for Conservation of Nature has listed it as being "least concern".
