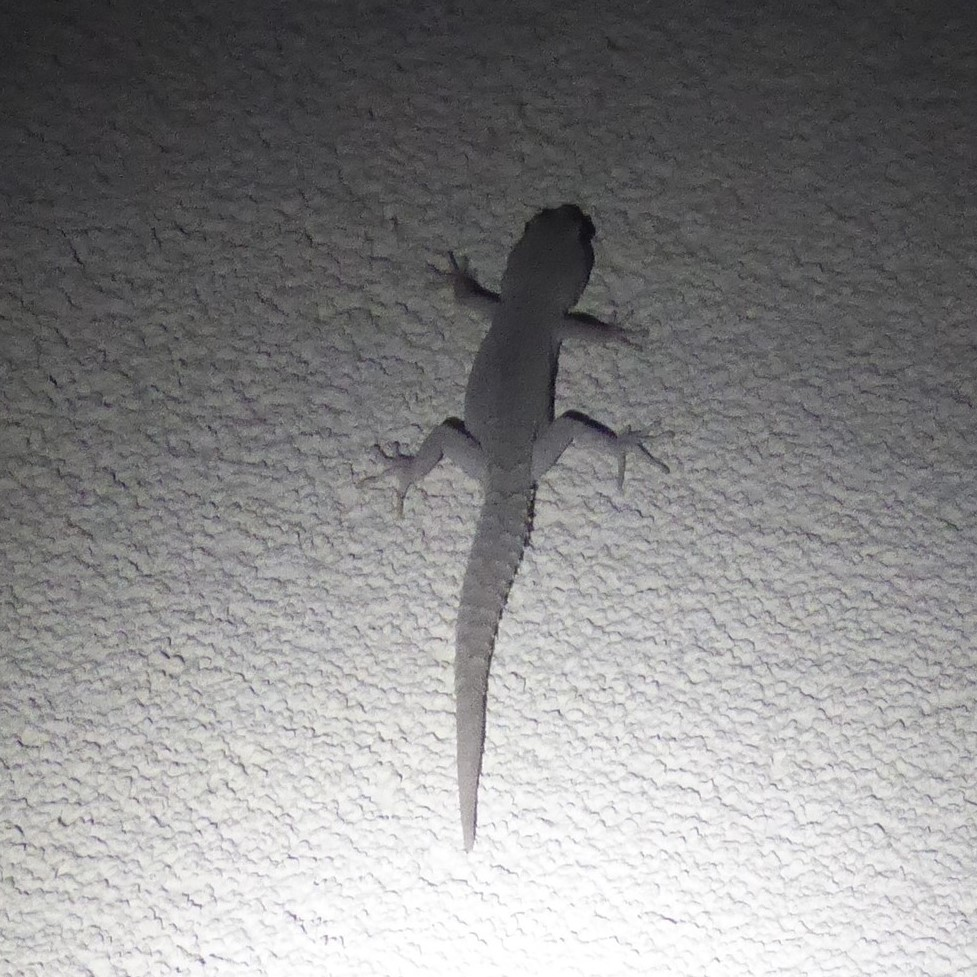

Conservation status
- Least Concern (IUCN 3.1)

Scientific classification
- Kingdom: Animalia
- Phylum: Chordata
- Class: Reptilia
- Order: Squamata
- Suborder: Gekkota
- Family: Gekkonidae
- Genus: Mediodactylus
- Species: M. bartoni

Binomial name
- Mediodactylus bartoni (Stepánek, 1934)

Synonyms
- Gymnodactylus bartoni; Gymnodactylus kotschyi bartoni; Cyrtodactylus kotschyi bartoni; Tenuidactylys kotschyi bartoni; Mediodactylus kotschyi bartoni; Cyrtopodion kotschyi bartoni

= Barton's thin-toed gecko =

Species of lizard

Barton's thin-toed gecko (Mediodactylus bartoni) is a species of lizard in the family Gekkonidae. It is endemic to Crete and nearby islets. It used to be considered a subspecies of Kotschy's gecko.
