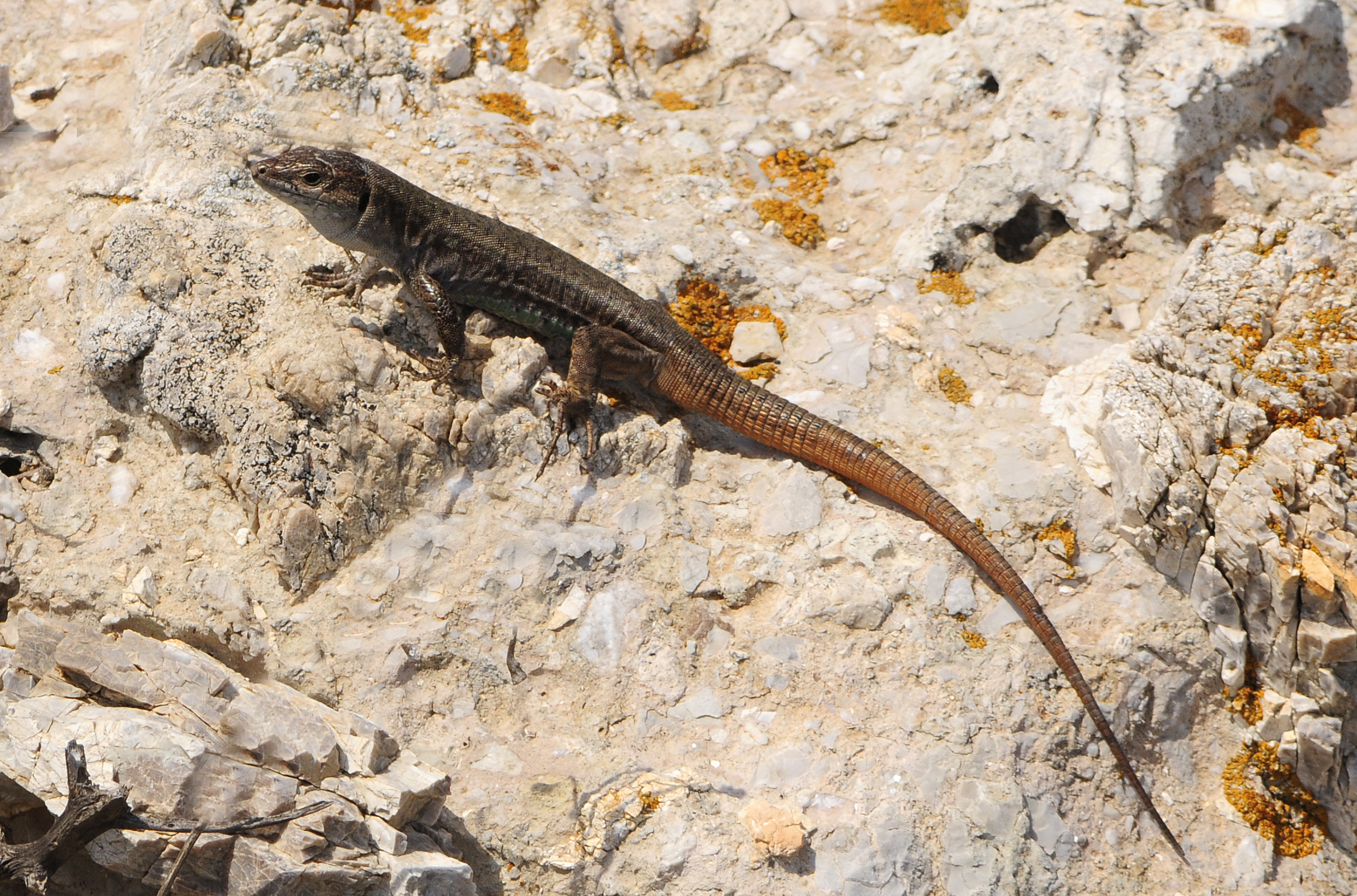

Conservation status
- Vulnerable (IUCN 3.1)

Scientific classification
- Kingdom: Animalia
- Phylum: Chordata
- Class: Reptilia
- Order: Squamata
- Family: Lacertidae
- Genus: Podarcis
- Species: P. levendis

Binomial name
- Podarcis levendis Lymberakis, Poulakakis, Kaliontzopoulou, Valakos, & Mylonas, 2008

= Podarcis levendis =

Species of lizard

Podarcis levendis is a species of lizard in the family Lacertidae. It is endemic to two islets in Greece, both located north of the island of Antikythera.
