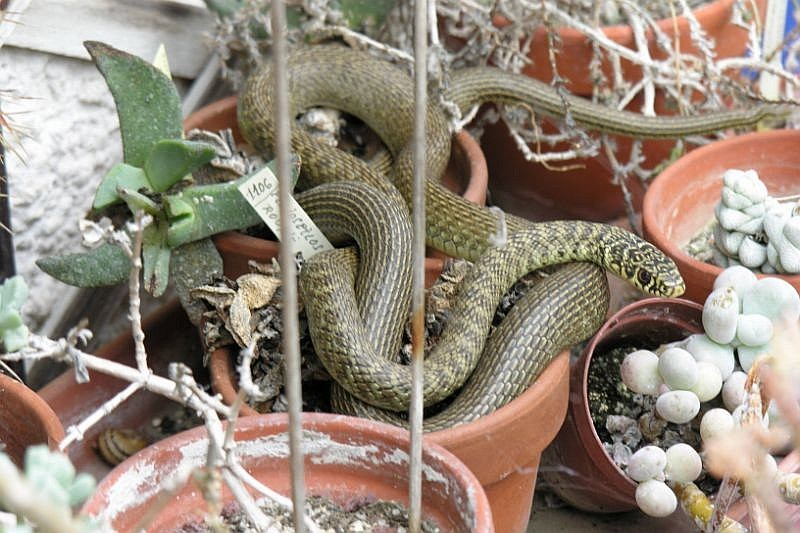
- Green whip snake (Hierophis viridiflavus)

Scientific classification
- Kingdom: Animalia
- Phylum: Chordata
- Class: Reptilia
- Order: Squamata
- Suborder: Serpentes
- Family: Colubridae
- Subfamily: Colubrinae
- Genus: Hierophis; Fitzinger, 1834

= Hierophis =

Genus of snakes

Hierophis is a genus of snake in the family Colubridae. It contains the following species:

- Balkan whip snake (Hierophis gemonensis)
- Cyprus whip snake (Hierophis cypriensis)
- Green whip snake (Hierophis viridiflavus)
- Algerian whip snake (Hierophis algirus)
- European black whip snake (Hierophis carbonarius)
