= List of reptiles of Europe =

This is a list of reptiles of Europe. It includes all reptiles currently found in Europe. It does not include species found only in captivity or extinct in Europe, except where there is some doubt about this, nor (with few exceptions) does it currently include species introduced in recent decades. Each species is listed, with its binomial name and notes on its distribution where this is limited. Also this list is incomplete.

Summary of 2006 IUCN Red List categories.

Conservation status - IUCN Red List of Threatened Species:

EX - extinct, EW - extinct in the wild
CR - critically endangered, EN - endangered, VU - vulnerable
NT - near threatened, LC - least concern
DD - data deficient, NE - not evaluated
(v. 2013.2, the data is current as of March 5, 2014)

== Turtles ==
Family: Testudinidae (tortoises)

Subfamily: Testudininae

- Hermann's tortoise, Testudo hermanni NT (ssp. hermanni: EN) (Southern Europe)
- Spur-thighed tortoise, Testudo graeca VU (ssp. nikolskii: CR) (Southern Europe)
- Marginated tortoise, Testudo marginata LC (Southern Europe)
- Horsfield's tortoise, Testudo horsfieldi VU (Russia)

Family: Emydidae (pond turtles)

Subfamily: Emydinae

- European pond terrapin, Emys orbicularis LR/nt
- Sicilian pond turtle, Emys trinacris DD (Sicily)

Subfamily: Deirochelyinae

- Red-eared slider, Trachemys scripta LC (non-native)
- Painted turtle, Chrysemys picta LC (introduced to Spain and Germany)

Family: Geoemydidae

Subfamily: Geoemydinae

- Spanish pond turtle, Mauremys leprosa (Spain, Portugal, France)
- Balkan pond turtle, Mauremys rivulata (south-eastern Europe, Turkey)
- Caspian turtle, Mauremys caspica (Southern Europe)

Family: Cheloniidae

Subfamily: Carettinae

- Loggerhead sea turtle, Caretta caretta VU (Southern Europe)
- Kemp's ridley sea turtle, Lepidochelys kempii CR

Subfamily: Cheloniinae

- Green turtle, Chelonia mydas LC (Southern Europe)
- Hawksbill sea turtle, Eretmochelys imbricata CR (in Europe Great Britain, Portugal)

Family: Dermochelyidae

- Leatherback turtle, Dermochelys coriacea VU (Northwest Atlantic Ocean subpopulation: LC)

Family: Trionychidae (softshells)

Subfamily: Trionychinae

- Nile soft-shelled turtle, Trionyx triunguis (Mediterranean subpopulation: CR) (Greece)

== Amphisbaenia, lizards and snakes ==
=== Amphisbaenians ===
Family: Blanidae (Mediterranean worm lizards)

- Iberian worm lizard, Blanus cinereus LC (Iberia) and: (Note: Species split from this species or considered as distinct species alternatively. All these taxa occur in the area of interest, including the one on the left.)

- Vandelli's worm lizard, Blanus vandellii (Iberia)

- Anatolian worm lizard, Blanus strauchi LC (Aegean islands, southern Anatolia and Syria)
- Blanus mariae (Portugal)

Family: Trogonophidae (Palearctic worm lizards)

=== Lizards ===
Family: Agamidae (agamas)

Subfamily: Agaminae

- Stellion, Laudakia stellio (Greek islands) and:

- Cyprus rock agama, Laudakia cypriaca (Cyprus)

- Caucasian agama, Paralaudakia caucasia (Ukraine and Russia)
- Steppe agama, Trapelus sanguinolentus (Russia, Kazakhstan)
- Spotted toadhead agama, Phrynocephalus guttatus LC (Russia, Kazakhstan)
- European toad-headed agama, Phrynocephalus helioscopus LC (Ukraine and Russia)
- Secret toadhead agama, Phrynocephalus mystaceus (Russia, Kazakhstan)
- Psammophilus dorsalis LC (Germany - introduced)

Family: Chamaeleonidae (chameleons)

- Mediterranean chameleon, Chamaeleo chamaeleon LC (southern Europe)
- African chameleon, Chamaeleo africanus (Greece)

Family: Dactyloidae (anoles and related species)

- Green anole, Anolis carolinensis LC (Spain - introduced)

Family: Gekkonidae

- Caspian straight-fingered gecko, Alsophylax pipiens LC (Russia)
- Caspian naked-fingered gecko, Tenuidactylus caspius LC (Russia, Georgia)
- Kotschy's naked-toed gecko, Mediodactylus kotschyi LC (southern Europe) and:

- Barton's thin-toed gecko, Mediodactylus (kotschyi) bartoni (Crete island in Greece)
- Mediterranean thin-toed gecko, Mediodactylus (kotschyi) danilewskii (south-eastern Europe)
- Mediterranean thin-toed gecko, Mediodactylus (kotschyi) oertzeni (Dodecanese islands in Greece)

- Caucasian gecko, Mediodactylus russowii LC (in Europe southern Russia, extirpated)
- Mediterranean house gecko, Hemidactylus turcicus LC (southern Europe)

Family: Phyllodactylidae

- Gomero wall gecko, Tarentola gomerensis LC (Spain)
- Moorish gecko, Tarentola mauritanica LC (southern Europe)

Family: Sphaerodactylidae

- European leaf-toed gecko, Euleptes europaea NT (France, Italy, Tunisia, Mediterranean islands)

Family: Lacertidae (wall or true lizards)

Subfamily: Gallotiinae

- Large psammodromus, Psammodromus algirus LC (Conigli islet near Lampedusa island)
- Psammodromus jeanneae LC (Spain, France)
- Psammodromus manuelae LC (Spain, Portugal)
- Spanish psammodromus, Psammodromus hispanicus LC (Spain and France) and:

- East Iberian psammodromus, Psammodromus (hispanicus) edwardsianus (Spain and France)

- Psammodromus occidentalis (Spain)

Subfamily: Lacertinae

Tribe: Eremiadini
- Red-tailed spiny-footed lizard, Acanthodactylus erythrurus LC (Africa and Southern Europe)
- Steppe-runner, Eremias arguta (south-eastern Europe and Russia)
- Rapid racerunner, Eremias velox (southern Russia)
- Snake-eyed lizard, Ophisops elegans (Mediterranean and Central Asia)
- Acanthodactylus schreiberi EN (Cyprus in Asia - Greece, Turkey)
Tribe: Lacertini
- Blue-throated keeled lizard, Algyroides nigropunctatus LC (south-eastern Europe)
- Greek algyroides, Algyroides moreoticus NT (Greek islands)
- Fitzinger's algyroides, Algyroides fitzingeri LC (Corsica, Sardinia)
- Spanish algyroides, Algyroides marchi EN (Spain)
- Iberian emerald lizard, Lacerta schreiberi NT (Iberian Peninsula)
- Balkan green lizard, Lacerta trilineata LC (south-eastern Europe) and:

- Rhodos green lizard, Lacerta (trilineata) diplochondrodes (Rhodos island in Greece)
- Tinos green lizard, Lacerta (trilineata) citrovittata (Tinos island in Greece)

- European green lizard, Lacerta viridis LC
- Western green lacerta, Lacerta bilineata LC
- Sand lizard, Lacerta agilis LC
- Mosor rock lizard, Lacerta mosorensis VU (Balkans)
- Greek rock lizard, Lacerta graeca NT (Greece)
- Caucasus emerald lizard, Lacerta strigata LC (Russia, Georgia, Turkey)
- Medium lizard, Lacerta media LC (Russia, Georgia, Turkey)
- Viviparous lizard, Zootoca vivipara LC (ssp pannonica: VU) and:

- Zootoca carniolica (Slovenia, Italy, Austria, Croatia)

- Bedriaga's rock lizard, Archaeolacerta bedriagae NT (Corsica, Sardinia)
- Iberian rock lizard, Iberolacerta monticola VU (Iberian Peninsula)
- Pyrenean rock lizard, Iberolacerta bonnali NT (France, Spain)
- Aran rock lizard, Iberolacerta aranica EN (France, Spain)
- Aurelio's rock lizard, Iberolacerta aurelioi EN (Andorra, France, Spain)
- Horvath's rock lizard, Iberolacerta horvathi NT (central and southern Europe)
- Iberolacerta cyreni EN (Spain)
- Iberolacerta galani NT (Spain)
- Iberolacerta martinezricai CR (Spain)
- Prokletije rock lizard, Dinarolacerta montenegrina LC (Montenegro)
- Anatolian rock lizard, Anatololacerta anatolica LC (formerly in Anatololacerta danfordi, Greece, Turkey)
- Anatololacerta oertzeni LC (Greece, Turkey) and:

- Anatololacerta pelasgiana (Greece, Turkey)
- Anatololacerta finikensis (Turkey, Greece)

- Darevskia praticola NT (Balkans, Russia, Georgia) and:

- Meadow lizard, Darevskia (praticola) pontica (Romania, Balkans, Georgia, Turkey)

- Darevskia saxicola LC (Russia, Georgia, Turkey)
- Darevskia caucasica LC (Russia, Georgia)
- Darevskia rudis LC (Russia, Georgia, Turkey)
- Armenian rock lizard, Darevskia armeniaca LC (Ukraine - introduced, Georgia, Turkey)
- Darevskia lindholmi (Ukraine)
- Darevskia dahli NT (Ukraine, Georgia)
- Darevskia derjugini NT (Russia, Georgia)
- Darevskia alpina VU (Russia, Georgia)
- Brauner's rock lizard, Darevskia brauneri LC (Ukraine, Russia, Georgia, Turkey) and:

- Szczerbak's lizard, Darevskia (brauneri) szczerbaki (Russia)

- Dagestan lizard, Darevskia daghestanica LC (Russia, Georgia)
- Common wall lizard, Podarcis muralis LC
- Iberian wall lizard, Podarcis hispanicus LC (Iberian Peninsula, France, northwestern Africa) and:

- Columbretes wall lizard, Podarcis liolepis (Iberian Peninsula, France)
- Podarcis galerai (Spain)

- Carbonell's wall lizard, Podarcis carbonelli EN (Iberian Peninsula)
- Bocage's wall lizard, Podarcis bocagei LC (Spain, France)
- Lilford's wall lizard, Podarcis lilfordi EN (Spain)
- Ibiza wall lizard, Podarcis pityusensis NT (Spain)
- Tyrrhenian wall lizard, Podarcis tiliguerta LC (Sardinia, Corsica)
- Italian wall lizard, Podarcis siculus LC (Italy and south-eastern Europe, introduced to Spain) and:

- Pontian wall lizard, Podarcis latastei (Italy)

- Sicilian wall lizard, Podarcis waglerianus LC (Italy)
- Aeolian wall lizard, Podarcis raffonei CR (Italy)
- Maltese wall lizard, Podarcis filfolensis LC (Malta)
- Sharp-snouted rock lizard, Podarcis oxycephala LC (Balkans)
- Dalmatian wall lizard, Podarcis melisellensis LC (Balkans)
- Balkan wall lizard, Podarcis tauricus LC (south-eastern Europe and Russia) and:

- Skyros wall lizard, Podarcis gaigeae VU
- Ionian wall lizard, Podarcis ionicus (Greece)

- Erhard's wall lizard, Podarcis erhardii LC (south-eastern Europe) and:

- Podarcis cretensis EN (Greece)

- Peloponnese wall lizard, Podarcis peloponnesiacus LC (Peloponnese)
- Milos wall lizard, Podarcis milensis VU (Greece)
- Podarcis vaucheri LC (Spain, Portugal)
- Podarcis guadarramae (Spain, Portugal)
- Podarcis virescens (Spain, Portugal)
- Podarcis levendis VU (Greece)
- Moroccan rock lizard, Scelarcis perspicillata LC (Menorca - Spain, introduced)
- Phoenicolacerta troodica LC (Cyprus in Asia - Greece, Turkey)
- Ocellated lizard, Timon lepidus NT (south-western Europe) and:

- Sierra Nevada lizard, Timon nevadensis (Spain)

Family: Scincidae (skinks)

Subfamily: Scincinae

- European snake-eyed skink, Ablepharus kitaibelii LC (south-eastern Europe)
- Budak's snake-eyed skink, Ablepharus budakiLC (Greece - Cyprus, Turkey)
- Ocellated skink, Chalcides ocellatus (Greece, Sicily and Sardinia)
- Bedriaga's skink, Chalcides bedriagai NT (Iberian Peninsula)
- Western three-toed skink, Chalcides striatus LC (France, Italy, Iberian Peninsula)
- Italian three-toed skink, Chalcides chalcides LC (France, Italy)
- Limbless skink, Ophiomorus punctatissimus LC (Greece, Turkey)
- Schneider's skink, Eumeces schneiderii (Russia, Turkey)

Subfamily: Lygosomatinae / Family: Mabuyidae

- Bridled mabuya, Trachylepis vittata LC (Cyprus in Asia - Greece, Turkey)
- Levant skink, Heremites auratus LC (few islands in Greece, Turkey)
- Santo Antão skink, Chioninia fogoensis LC (Madeira - Introduced)

Family: Anguidae

Subfamily: Anguinae

- Common slowworm, Anguis fragilis
- Peloponnese slowworm, Anguis cephalonnica NT (Greece)
- Italian slowworm, Anguis veronensis (Italy, south-eastern France)
- Eastern slowworm, Anguis colchica
- Greek slowworm, Anguis graeca
- European glass lizard, Ophisaurus apodus (south-eastern Europe)

=== Snakes ===
Family: Typhlopidae (blind snakes)

- Worm snake, Xerotyphlops vermicularis (south-eastern Europe)

Family: Boidae (boas)

Subfamily: Erycinae/Erycidae

- Sand boa, Eryx jaculus (south-eastern Europe)
- Dwarf sand boa, Eryx miliaris (in Europe southern Russia)

Family: Colubridae (colubrids)

Subfamily: Colubrinae

- Western whip snake, Hierophis viridiflavus LC (south-western Europe, Italy, Switzerland and Slovenia)
- Caspian whipsnake, Dolichophis caspius (south-eastern Europe, Turkey)
- Large whip snake, Dolichophis jugularis LC (south-eastern Europe)
- Red-bellied racer, Dolichophis schmidti LC (Russia, Turkey, Georgia)
- Horseshoe whip snake, Hemorrhois hippocrepis LC (Italy, Iberian Peninsula)
- Spotted whip snake, Hemorrhois ravergieri (Greece, Turkey, Georgia)
- Algerian whip snake, Hemorrhois algirus LC (Malta)
- Coin snake, Hemorrhois nummifer (has been mentioned from European Turkey but actual presence in Europe remains unconfirmed and demands substantiation)
- Red whip snake, Platyceps collaris LC (Bulgaria, Turkey)
- Dahl's whip snake, Platyceps najadum LC (south-eastern Europe)
- Balkan whip snake, Hierophis gemonensis LC (south-eastern Europe)
- Cyprus whip snake, Hierophis cypriensis EN (Cyprus in Asia - Greece, Turkey)
- Asia Minor dwarf racer, Eirenis modestus LC (Greece, Russia, Turkey, Georgia)
- Collared dwarf racer, Eirenis collaris LC (Bulgaria, Turkey, Georgia)
- Four-lined snake, Elaphe quatuorlineata NT (south-eastern Europe)
- Blotched snake, Elaphe sauromates (eastern and south-eastern Europe) and:

- Urartian rat snake, Elaphe urartica (eastern Europe)

- Steppes ratsnake, Elaphe dione (Ukraine, Russia, Georgia, Kazakhstan)
- Beauty snake, Elaphe taeniura VU (Introduced to Belgium and Netherlands)
- Slender racer, Orientocoluber spinalis (southern Russia)
- Ladder snake, Zamenis scalaris LC (Iberian Peninsula, France)
- Transcaucasian rat snake, Zamenis hohenackeri LC (Russia, Georgia, Turkey)
- Leopard snake, Zamenis situla LC (southern Europe)
- Aesculapian snake, Zamenis longissimus LC
- Italian Aesculapian snake, Zamenis lineatus DD (Italy)
- Smooth snake, Coronella austriaca
- Southern smooth snake, Coronella girondica LC (Iberian Peninsula, France, Italy)
- European cat snake, Telescopus fallax LC (south-eastern Europe)
- False smooth snake, Macroprotodon brevis NT (Iberian peninsula)
- False smooth snake, Macroprotodon cucullatus LC (Iberian peninsula) and:

- Macroprotodon mauritanicus (Mallorca and Menorca, introduced)

Subfamily: Natricinde/Natricinae

- Viperine water snake, Natrix maura LC
- Grass snake, Natrix natrix LR/lc (ssp. cetti: CR, schweizeri: CR) and:

- Iberian grass snake, Natrix astreptophora (Iberian Peninsula, France)
- Barred grass snake, Natrix helvetica (western and southern Europe)

- Dice snake, Natrix tessellata LC
- Large-headed water snake, Natrix megalocephala VU (Russia, Turkey, Georgia)

Family: Lamprophiidae

Subfamily: Psammophiinae

- Montpellier snake, Malpolon monspessulanus LC (southwestern Europe)
- Eastern Montpellier snake, Malpolon insignitus (southeastern Europe)

Family: Viperidae

Subfamily: Viperinae

- Ottoman viper, Montivipera xanthina LC (Greece)
- Caucasus viper, Vipera kaznakovi EN (Russia, Georgia, Turkey)
- Orsini's viper, meadow viper, Vipera ursinii VU (ssp. moldavica: CR, ssp. rakosiensis: EN) (south-eastern France, central Italy, west Balkans, northern Greece, Hungary, Romania) and:

- Greek meadow viper, Vipera (ursinii) graeca (Albania, Greece)

- European adder, Vipera berus LC and:

- Vipera walser (Italy)

- Seoane's viper, Vipera seoanei LC (Iberia)
- Asp viper, Vipera aspis LC (south-western Europe, Italy and Switzerland)
- Lataste's viper, Vipera latastei VU (Iberia)
- Nose-horned viper, Vipera ammodytes LC (south-eastern Europe, Hungary and Austria)
- Nikolsky's adder, Vipera nikolskii (Ukraine)
- Meadow viper, Vipera renardi (Russia)
- Magnificent viper, Vipera magnifica EN (Russia)
- Orlov's viper, Vipera orlovi CR (Russia)
- Lotiev's viper, Vipera lotievi NT (Russia, Georgia)
- Caucasus subalpine viper, Vipera dinniki VU (Russia, Georgia)
- Milos viper, Macrovipera schweizeri EN (Islands of Milos, Kimolos, Polyaigos, Sifnos)
- Blunt-nosed viper, Macrovipera lebetina (southern Russia, Cyprus in Asia - Greece, Turkey)

Subfamily: Crotalinae

- Halys pit viper, Gloydius halys (Russia, Kazakhstan) and:

- Karaganda pit viper, Gloydius caraganus (Kazakhstan, Russia)

== See also ==
- List of European amphibians
- List of European birds
- List of European mammals
- List of extinct animals of Europe
- List of reptiles of Caucasus region
- List of amphibians and reptiles of Cantabria
