= List of reptiles of Metropolitan France =

Metropolitan France refers to the area of France located on the European continent, including mainland France and Corsica. It is home to 20 native species of lizards, 13 species of snakes and 3 species of terrestrial and freshwater turtles. 3 species of marine turtles are regularly present in the region, while 3 other have a transient presence. Introduced species include the Italian wall lizard, the pond slider and the common snapping turtle.

== Lizards ==
Native lizard species of Metropolitan France
Common name	Scientific name	Range	IUCN status (France)	IUCN status (worldwide)	Refs.
Fitzinger's algyroides	Algyroides fitzingeri (Wiegmann, 1834)		LC	LC	
Slow worm	Anguis fragilis Linnaeus, 1758		LC	LC	
Italian slow worm	Anguis veronensis Pollini, 1818		DD	NE	
Bedriaga's rock lizard	Archaeolacerta bedriagae (Camerano, 1885)		NT	NT	
Western three-toed skink	Chalcides striatus (Cuvier, 1829)		LC	LC	
European leaf-toed gecko	Euleptes europaea (Gené, 1839)		LC	NT	
Mediterranean house gecko	Hemidactylus turcicus (Linnaeus, 1758)		LC	LC	
Aran rock lizard	Iberolacerta aranica (Arribas, 1993)		EN	EN	
Aurelio's rock lizard	Iberolacerta aurelioi (Arribas, 1994)		EN	EN	
Pyrenean rock lizard	Iberolacerta bonnali (Lantz, 1927)		VU	NT	
Sand lizard	Lacerta agilis Linnaeus, 1758		NT	LC	
Western green lizard	Lacerta bilineata Daudin, 1802		LC	LC	
Columbretes wall lizard	Podarcis liolepis (Boulenger, 1905)		LC	LC	
Common wall lizard	Podarcis muralis (Laurenti, 1768)		LC	LC	
Tyrrhenian wall lizard	Podarcis tiliguerta (Gmelin, 1789)		LC	LC	
Algerian psammodromus	Psammodromus algirus (Linnaeus, 1758)		LC	LC	
East Iberian sand racer	Psammodromus edwarsianus (Dugès, 1829)		NT	LC	
Common wall gecko	Tarentola mauritanica (Linnaeus, 1758)		LC	LC	
Ocellated lizard	Timon lepidus (Daudin, 1802)		VU	LC	
Viviparous lizard	Zootoca vivipara (Lichtenstein, 1823)		LC	LC	

=== Introduced species ===
The Italian wall lizard is believed to have been introduced in Corsica in antiquity. It is a more recent introduction in other parts of Southern France.

Non-native lizard species of Metropolitan France
Common name	Scientific name	Range	IUCN status (France)	IUCN status (worldwide)	Refs.
Italian wall lizard	Podarcis siculus (Rafinesque, 1810)		NA	LC	

== Snakes ==
Snake species of Metropolitan France
Common name	Scientific name	Range	IUCN status (France)	IUCN status (worldwide)	Refs.
Smooth snake	Coronella austriaca Laurenti, 1768		LC	LC	
Southern smooth snake	Coronella girondica (Daudin, 1803)		LC	LC	
Green whip snake	Hierophis viridiflavus (Lacépède, 1789)		LC	LC	
Montpellier snake	Malpolon monspessulanus (Hermann, 1804)		LC	LC	
Iberian grass snake	Natrix astreptophora (Seoane, 1885)				
Barred grass snake	Natrix helvetica (Lacépède, 1789)				
Viperine water snake	Natrix maura (Linnaeus, 1758)		NT	LC	
Ladder snake	Rhinechis scalaris (Schinz, 1822)		LC	LC	
Asp viper	Vipera aspis (Linnaeus, 1758)		LC	VU	
Common European adder	Vipera berus (Linnaeus, 1758)		VU	LC	
Meadow viper	Vipera ursinii (Bonaparte, 1835)		EN	VU	
Baskian viper	Vipera seoanei Lataste, 1879		VU	LC	
Aesculapian snake	Zamenis longissimus (Laurenti, 1768)		LC	LC	

== Turtles ==
Native turtle species of Metropolitan France
Common name	Scientific name	Range	IUCN status (France)	IUCN status (worldwide)	Refs.
Loggerhead sea turtle	Caretta caretta (Linnaeus, 1758)		DD	EN	
Leatherback sea turtle	Dermochelys coriacea (Vandelli, 1761)		DD	CR	
European pond turtle	Emys orbicularis (Linnaeus, 1758)		LC	NT	
Kemp's ridley sea turtle	Lepidochelys kempii (Garman, 1880)		DD	CR	
Spanish pond turtle	Mauremys leprosa Schweigger, 1812		VU	NE	
Hermann's tortoise	Testudo hermanni Gmelin, 1789		VU	NT	

=== Transient species ===
The green sea turtle (Chelonia mydas) has been sporadically reported in the French Mediterranean Sea. The olive ridley sea turtle (Lepidochelys olivacea) was observed for the first time in Metropolitan France in 2017, on the Atlantic coast near the Isle of Oléron.

Transient turtle species of Metropolitan France
Common name	Scientific name	Range	IUCN status (France)	IUCN status (worldwide)	Refs.
Green sea turtle	Chelonia mydas (Linnaeus, 1758)		NA	EN	
Hawksbill sea turtle	Eretmochelys imbricata (Linnaeus, 1766)		NA	CR	
Olive ridley sea turtle	Lepidochelys olivacea (Eschscholtz, 1829)			VU	

=== Introduced species ===
The pond slider (Trachemys scripta) was introduced in France through the pet trade, having been imported in large numbers starting in the 1980s. It has since been reported in nearly all French departments, and acts as a competitor to the native European pond turtle, with which it shares an ecological niche. After import of pond sliders was banned in 1997, the common snapping turtle (Chelydra serpentina) was commercialized in France, with former pets being released in the wild. Nests and juveniles have been reported in the departments of Gard, Haute-Garonne, Gironde and Loire-Atlantique.

Non-native turtle species of Metropolitan France
Common name	Scientific name	Range	IUCN status (France)	IUCN status (worldwide)	Refs.
Common snapping turtle	Chelydra serpentina (Linnaeus, 1758)			LC	
Pond slider	Trachemys scripta (Thunberg and Schoepff, 1792)		NA	LC	

== See also ==
- Fauna of Metropolitan France
- List of amphibians and reptiles of Guadeloupe
- List of amphibians and reptiles of Martinique
- List of amphibians and reptiles of Saint Barthélemy
- List of amphibians and reptiles of Saint Martin
