= Lacerta monticola =

Lacerta monticola is a synonymous species name that has been applied to several taxa:

- Iberolacerta monticola
- Iberolacerta galani
- Iberolacerta bonnali
- Iberolacerta cyreni cyreni
