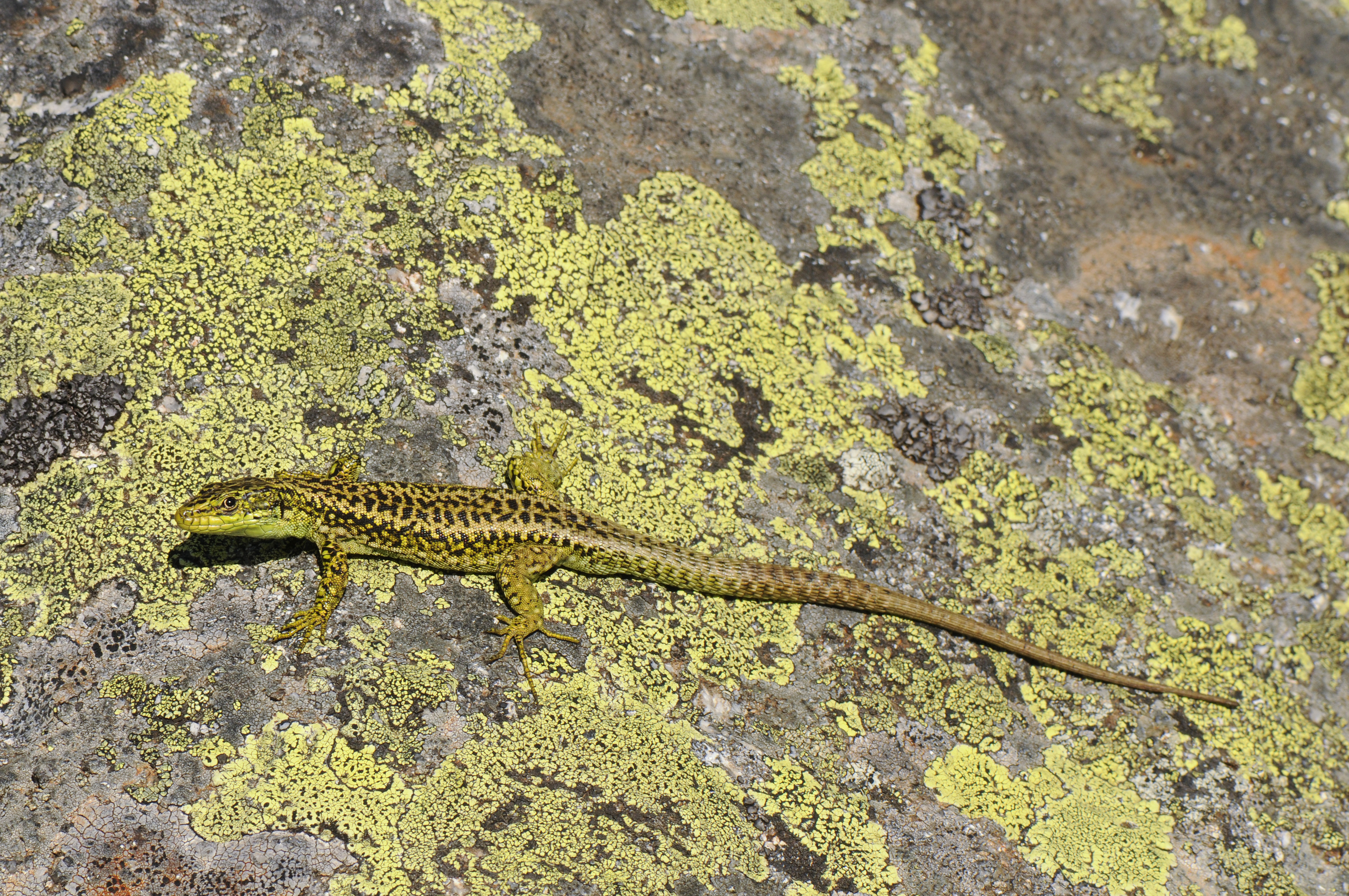

Conservation status
- Endangered (IUCN 3.1)

Scientific classification
- Kingdom: Animalia
- Phylum: Chordata
- Class: Reptilia
- Order: Squamata
- Family: Lacertidae
- Genus: Iberolacerta
- Species: I. cyreni

Binomial name
- Iberolacerta cyreni (L. Müller & Hellmich, 1937)
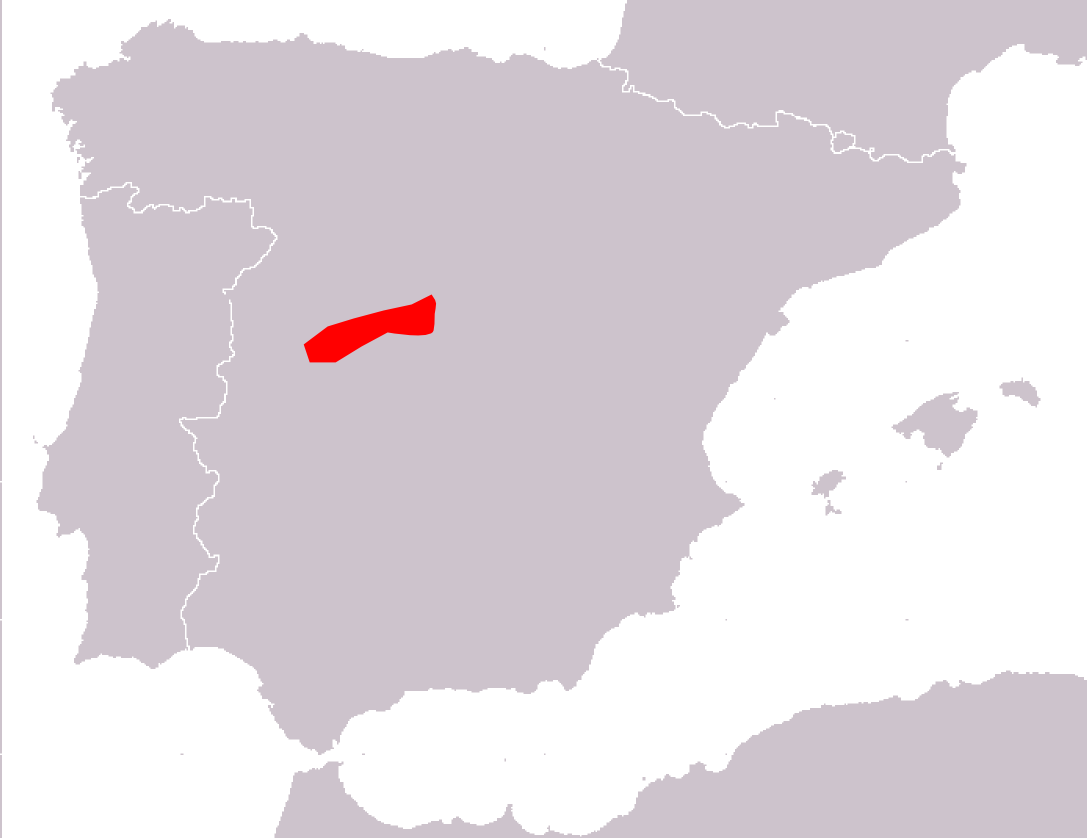

Synonyms
- Lacerta monticola cyreni L. Müller & Hellmich, 1937; Lacerta cyreni — Arribas, 1996; Iberolacerta cyreni — Arribas, 1997

= Iberolacerta cyreni =

Species of lizard

Iberolacerta cyreni, commonly known as the Cyren's rock lizard, is a species of lizard in the family Lacertidae. The species is endemic to central Spain and is currently listed as endangered by the IUCN due to global warming. I. cyreni has evolved to exhibit key behavioral characteristics, namely individual recognition, in which a lizard is able to identify another organism of the same species, as well as thermoregulation.

== Etymology ==
The genus name, "Iberolacerta," signifies how these lizards are native to Spain, which is located on the Iberian peninsula.

The specific name, "cyreni," is in honor of Swedish herpetologist Carl August Otto Cyrén.

== Description ==
Iberolacerta cyreni, or the rock lizard, can measure up to 8 cm (3.1 in) snout-to-vent and 24 cm (9.4 in) including the tail. I. cyreni are most likely species where males compete over females; in such cases, bigger lizards demonstrate greater reproductive success, thus resulting in overall larger body sizes and larger combat-related structures, such as the size of the head. In contrast, females are responsible for bearing offspring, and as a result, selection pressures that act on clutch volume or clutch size may favor larger abdomen sizes. As such, males demonstrate larger head sizes compared to females, while female lizards exceed males in abdomen length.

I.cyreni may appear brown or brown with a green undertone. They have dark brown spots aligned vertically down the length of their body. They can be distinguished from other western Iberian Rock Lizards by the lack of blue ocelli, or marks that looks like eyes, on its shoulders.

== Phylogeny ==
Iberian rock lizards are a part of the Iberolacerta genus, but because of perhaps the Holocene habitat fragmentation and Pleistocene glacial oscillations, there is a varying geographic distribution of these lizards, leading to speciation.

Genetic analysis performed on temperate vertebrate species suggests that many lizards of the genus Iberolacerta diverged before the Pleistocene, which poses that perhaps the high species endemism and richness came about from low rates of extinction in these geographies during the glacial maxima. This is probably due to the refuge effect, in which lizards obtain protection from predation during this period of extensive glaciation. Another hypothesis regarding the high species richness of Iberolacerta suggests that perhaps the complex topography of the southern European peninsulas, for example innumerable mountains, created distinct habitats that isolated lizards following colonization events.

They are part of the lacertid family, in which sexual dimorphism is observed. The rise of sexual dimorphism is attributed to sexual selection, influenced by female choice and between-male competition, and mating success.

The Iberolacerta genus has a well established monophyly; however the evolutionary relationships and systematic status of many taxa still remain unclear. There are many species contained under this genus, including the I. aurelio, the I. cyreni, the I. horvathi, the I. monticola, the I. bonnali, the I. castiliana, the I. cantabrica, and the I. aranica.

According to genetic analysis, mitochondrial DNA sequencing can assist in tree construction, in which it has identified four distinct clades that are supported by high bootstrap values. The first of the four clades includes the aranica, the bonnali, and the aureliioi. The second clade consists of the castiliaia and the cyreni, which are closely related. The third clade comprises the monticola and the cantabrica, and the fourth clade contains only the horvathi. The second clade (in the aforementioned portion) is the closest relative to the third clade, although this is supported by a relatively lower bootstrap score, while the tree reveals a closer relationship between the second and fourth clades. The clade consisting castaliana and cyreni accounts for one of the basal lineages and may be a part of a monophyletic clade with I. monticola, which suggests that I. cyreni should be interpreted as a distinct species.

The genetic divergence observed in this analysis suggests that isolation has persisted for over millions of years, but based on the geographical habitats that separate the range of this taxa, perhaps they have previously been in contact repeatedly. However, it can be ascertained that genetic isolation has persisted by mechanisms of reproductive isolation, including prezygotic isolation mechanisms and karyological differences (postzygotic isolation).

The most parsimonious occurrence regarding evolution of Iberolacerta lizards suggests a preliminary period of geographical expansion, followed by fragmentation events bringing about the four main clades in the eastern Alps, Pyrenees, northwest Iberian mountains, and Central Iberian mountains. Subsequent isolation events may have contributed to further divergence within these four regions.

=== Subspecies ===
There are two subspecies of I. cyreni, which are recognized as being valid, including the nominotypical subspecies.

- Iberolacerta cyreni castilliana (Arribas, 1996)
- Iberolacerta cyreni cyreni (L. Müller & Hellmich, 1937)

Nota bene: A trinomial authority in parentheses indicates that the subspecies was originally described in a genus other than Iberolacerta.

== Diet ==
The diet of I. cyreni is composed mainly of invertebrates such as insects or spiders.

== Habitat ==
Lizards of the Iberolacerta genus reside in the mountainous areas of the Western Mediterranean region. In particular, I. cyreni are endemic to Spain's central mountain system in the Sierra del Guadarrama, Sierra de Gredos, Sierra de Bejar, and La Ser. These lizards are found near the tree line in more damp, rocky territories, but can also be found in temperate forests, temperate shrubland, temperate grassland, and plantations.

== Behavior ==
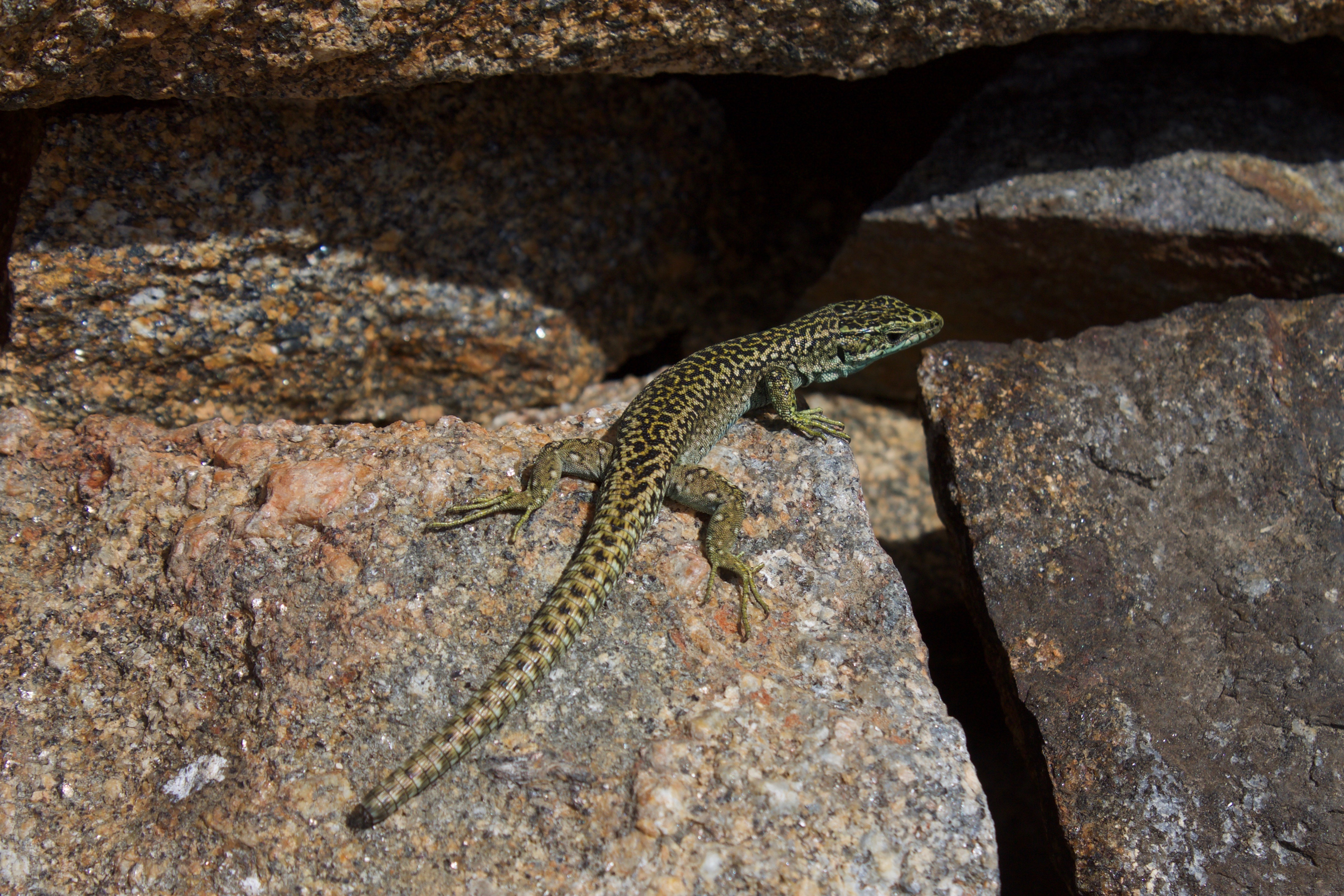

=== Individual recognition ===
Individual recognition, or the ability to identify an animal of the same species (a conspecific) is a notable evolutionary adaptation that becomes important in contexts where frequent encounters among the same individuals takes place or in circumstances where being identified by an animal of the same species is advantageous.

In lizards, like the I. cyreni, intraspecific communication via chemicals is a widely used mechanism, because they have fine sensory structures (including their tongue flicking behavior and vomero-nasal organ) and specialized epidermal glands (including the femoral glands and pre-cloacal glands). They also leave residual waxy secretions on substrates, informing conspecifics about individual characteristics like the dominance, age, fighting ability, color morph, and even immune response of the signaler. These lizards are also able to discern their own scent from that of others through gland secretions, another aspect of individual recognition.

From a series of experiments performed by Mangiacotti et al., it has been discerned that male rock lizards can distinguish proteins secreted from femoral glands while also discriminating their own proteins from that of other male conspecifics, allowing for class-level individual recognition (group member identification). However, these lizards are unable to distinguish unfamiliar males solely based on their protein signals, indicating the absence of automated, protein-based true individual recognition (unique recognition of conspecifics). I. cyreni have a strong aptitude for chemoreception, which is made possible because of the vomeronasal organ's sensitivity to heavy molecules like proteins; furthermore, femoral gland secretions rich in proteins can also elicit reduced latency and increased flicking of the tongue. Although male rock lizards are able to process conspecifics' chemical signals, they do not cater their own responses to such information according to each individual's unique features. Perhaps chemical signals found in lipids (in conjunction with proteins) can create a complex enough signal to elicit true individual recognition, although this is not as widely known. Additionally, chemical signals may underlie territorial defense in these lizards.

=== Thermoregulation ===
Regulating temperature is an important ecophysiological adaptation that allows lizards like I. cyreni to maintain a preferred body temperature in an environment where temperature fluctuates (because of climate change) and a geographical region that imposes thermal constraints (i.e. the mountainous areas). Many of the lizards in the genus Iberolacerta have adapted to cold climates that were maintained in isolated habitats from the glacial maxima period of the Pleistocene epoch. In other reptiles, there is no optimal body temperature, but more so a narrow range that optimizes behavioral and physiological functions. More specific to rock lizards, their body temperature oscillates between an upper and lower limit that is a relatively wide range rather than preferring a central temperature. Even within the species, temperature oscillations vary according to individual body sizes, such that smaller lizards have a wider body temperature range and faster heating rates than larger lizards, which fits into the notion that heat gain and loss negatively correlate to body size. This suggests that smaller lizards have shorter, more frequent basking pulses to ensure that their body temperatures remain within a similar range as bigger lizards.

Data provided by Aguado suggest that rock lizards are active thermoregulators that reside in habitats of low thermal quality; their thermoregulatory accuracy is also limited, probably because the environmental temperature fluctuates considerably throughout the day. I. cyreni are similar to other diurnal heliothermic lizards in that they demonstrate a bimodal activity pattern during the middle portion of the day. Many lizards will take refuge in bushes or in rock crevices, where high environmental temperatures allow them to keep their body temperature near the optimum while allowing them to circumvent the risk of predation. Interestingly, although rock lizards naturally have a relatively low preferred temperature, in the summer their body temperature sometimes goes below this preferred temperature, which is common in many other species adapted to the cold. Such thermal preferences appear to be conserved in the Iberolacerta clade, most probably a result of their adaptation to mountain regions and their fragmented, isolated habitats during the cold Pleistocene era.

I. cyreni modify their behavior to adjust to the environmental temperature, as witnessed through different body orientations relative to the sun, postural modifications, changes in daily activity patterns, and even selection of microsites. In warmer, more unfavorable environmental temperatures, these lizards must devote more time and energy to thermoregulation over other activities, thus increasing their risk of predation. As a result, these cold-adapted lizards must be wary about accuracy in thermoregulation, as they can pose immediate and extreme fitness consequences. Evidence suggests a trade-off between antipredator behavior and basking, because these lizards may lose heat rapidly inside refuges. Although thermoregulation may have high costs, it is still beneficial to I. cyreni as opposed to thermoconformity in colder environmental temperatures.

=== Sound Production ===
While sound allows animals to communicate with heterospecifics and conspecifics in many social interactions, such as antipredator responses, mate choice, or aggressive behaviors, the role it plays in acoustic communication in reptiles is less understood. I. cyreni, in particular, are known to engage in other sensorial modalities like chemical and visual forms of communication, but recent evidence suggests that vocalizations produced by these lizards may also convey information. Within the lacertid family, sound production remains one of the behavioral traits delineating the Gallotiinae subfamily from the Lacertinae subfamily. Traditionally, Guillotine produces sounds in intra- and inter-specific encounters, while this trait is rare in the Lacertinae; however, I. cyreni may represent one of the historically few species within Lacertinae to generate vocalizations.

I. cyreni females are reported to emit sound by moving their body in two major phases. The first movement involves abruptly expelling air through rapid thoracic compressions of their lungs while their mouths are open. This is then followed by moving their heads upward and backward at a right angle to the ground, relaxing their thorax, and closing their mouth. The sound can be characterized as short nasal squeaks released in three to seven-note bouts, in which each squeak lasts about 122 milliseconds on average and is repeated every 6.4 seconds on average. The sound possesses more energy at the start of the note and then gradually subsides upon emission. Intervals between sound production are longer than the duration of the actual sound, in which the lizards change position before emitting another sound. The mechanism of sound production in I. cyreni resembles that of other lizards along with the sound's acoustic properties.

The functional relevance of sound activity in these lizards remains largely unknown, but it can be revealed through examining its behavior in a variety of contexts. Their vocalizations may correspond to communication signals directed to a potential predator, as their spectral and temporal structure coincide with a variety of acoustic patterns in distress calls and animal alarms.

== Reproduction ==
=== Mating ===
In lizards, male mating success is determined by several phenotypic correlates, including head size, body size, sexual coloration, territory, and behavioral traits (i.e. aggressiveness, activity). The mating system of I. cyreni is characterized as polygynandrous, in which both males and females have multiple mating partners. This is demonstrated through a high frequency of multiple sired clutches, where few males are more successful than others in mating and siring offspring of many female lizards. This is beneficial for both males and females, in that males can increase their reproductive success while females can increase their clutch sizes and hatching success. Several ecological factors could be attributed to such a mating system, such as short breeding seasons, extensive home range overlap, and high local population densities. Polygynandrous mating could allow for other mating strategies to persist in populations, given that mates are transient and the fact that large males do not dominate or claim females.

Additionally, these rock lizards demonstrate a role for mate choice, as the average distance between females and their offspring's sires is significantly greater than the distance to the nearest male. In fact, females do not always mate with the closest male to them, suggesting that females may pick mates far from where they reside. This could be evolutionarily adaptive if low levels of hatchling dispersal occurs, while mating with unrelated males may persist to avoid inbreeding.

=== Reproductive success ===
Specific male traits, including activity levels that are indicative of dominance and high quality, also explain the high variance in male reproductive success. Outside of the breeding season, male I. cyreni activity is typically low, as it decreases the risk of predation and ensures greater reproductive success in the future. However, during breeding season, male activity is high, as this favors their reproductive success by increasing their access to females through overlapping home ranges and male competitors. In terms of physical characteristics of males, longer tail lengths can indicate to females the ability for male lizards to bask at distances closer to their refuge, making them less vulnerable to predation. Tail length is a strong predictor of a male I. cyreni's reproductive success.

== Conservation status ==
I. cyreni are an endangered species of lizards, and one of the biggest threats to their habitats and survival is an outcome of global climate change. Global temperatures are rising due to climate change, which is detrimental to species adapted to cool climates such as mountainous species. Warmer temperatures could hinder rock lizards' hatchling success or potentially restrict their activity time spent avoiding overheating. Furthermore, global warming can indirectly impact these lizards by influencing other species, thus altering niche partitioning, increasing the risk of extinction, or encouraging competitive displacement by species more adapted to warmer temperatures.

Their habitats are also threatened by human development, particularly due to the construction of roads and ski resorts.

I. cyreni is protected in two specific areas: the Sierra del Guadarrama Natural Park and Sierra de Gredos Natural Park. Both of these places allow for these threatened lizards to continue reproducing and increase the population size.
