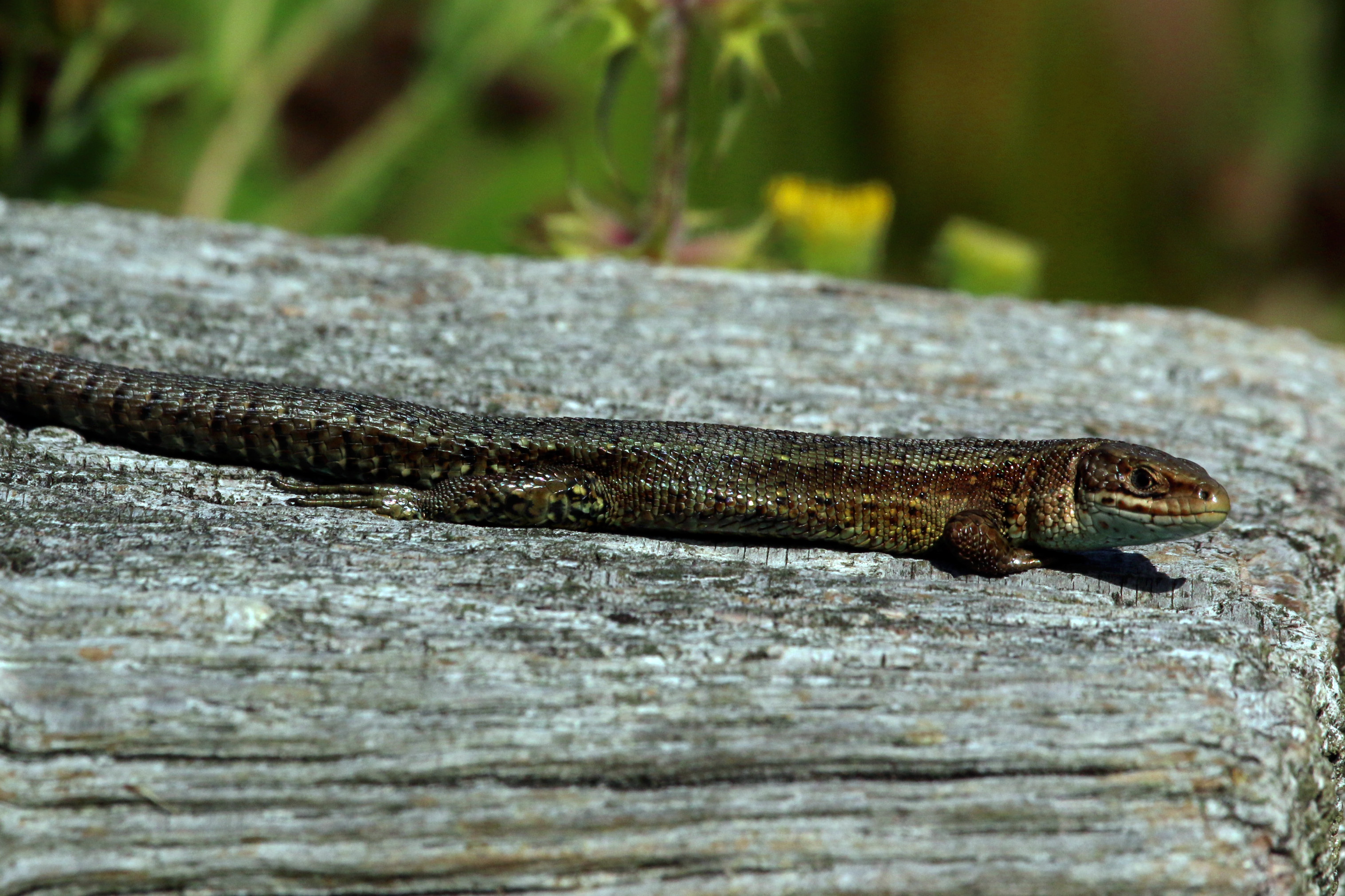
- Viviparous lizard (Zootoca vivipara)

Scientific classification
- Kingdom: Animalia
- Phylum: Chordata
- Class: Reptilia
- Order: Squamata
- Family: Lacertidae
- Subfamily: Lacertinae
- Genus: Zootoca; Wagler, 1830

Species
- See text.

= Zootoca =

Genus of lizards

Zootoca is a genus of lizards of the family Lacertidae.

== Species ==
- Zootoca vivipara (Lichtenstein, 1823) — viviparous lizard
- Zootoca carniolica (Mayer, Böhme, Tiedemann, & Bischoff, 2000)
