= Dinarolacerta montenegrina =

Conservation status
- Near Threatened (IUCN 3.1)

Scientific classification
- Kingdom: Animalia
- Phylum: Chordata
- Class: Reptilia
- Order: Squamata
- Family: Lacertidae
- Genus: Dinarolacerta
- Species: D. montenegrina

Binomial name
- Dinarolacerta montenegrina Ljubisavljević, Arribas, Dšukić, Carranza, 2007

Synonyms
- Lacerta mosorensis – Dzukic et al., 1997 (in part)

Species of lizard

Dinarolacerta montenegrina, also known as Prokletije rock lizard, is a species of lizard in the family Lacertidae. It is known with certainty only from the Prokletije mountain massif in Montenegro. The identity of a population of similar lizards in Albania needs confirmation.

Dinarolacerta montenegrina was first described in 2007. It differs genetically and morphologically from the most closely related species, Dinarolacerta mosorensis: in the exterior morphology, it is smaller; it has only one postnasal scale on one or both sides of its head; it has fewer temporal and postocular scales. The skeleton differs from D. mosorensis by its reduced supraocular osteoderms and the absence of an anteromedial process on the postocular bone.

Dinarolacerta montenegrina is known from debris fields and large rock outcrops at elevations of about 1,550–1,600 m (5,090–5,250 ft) above sea level.
