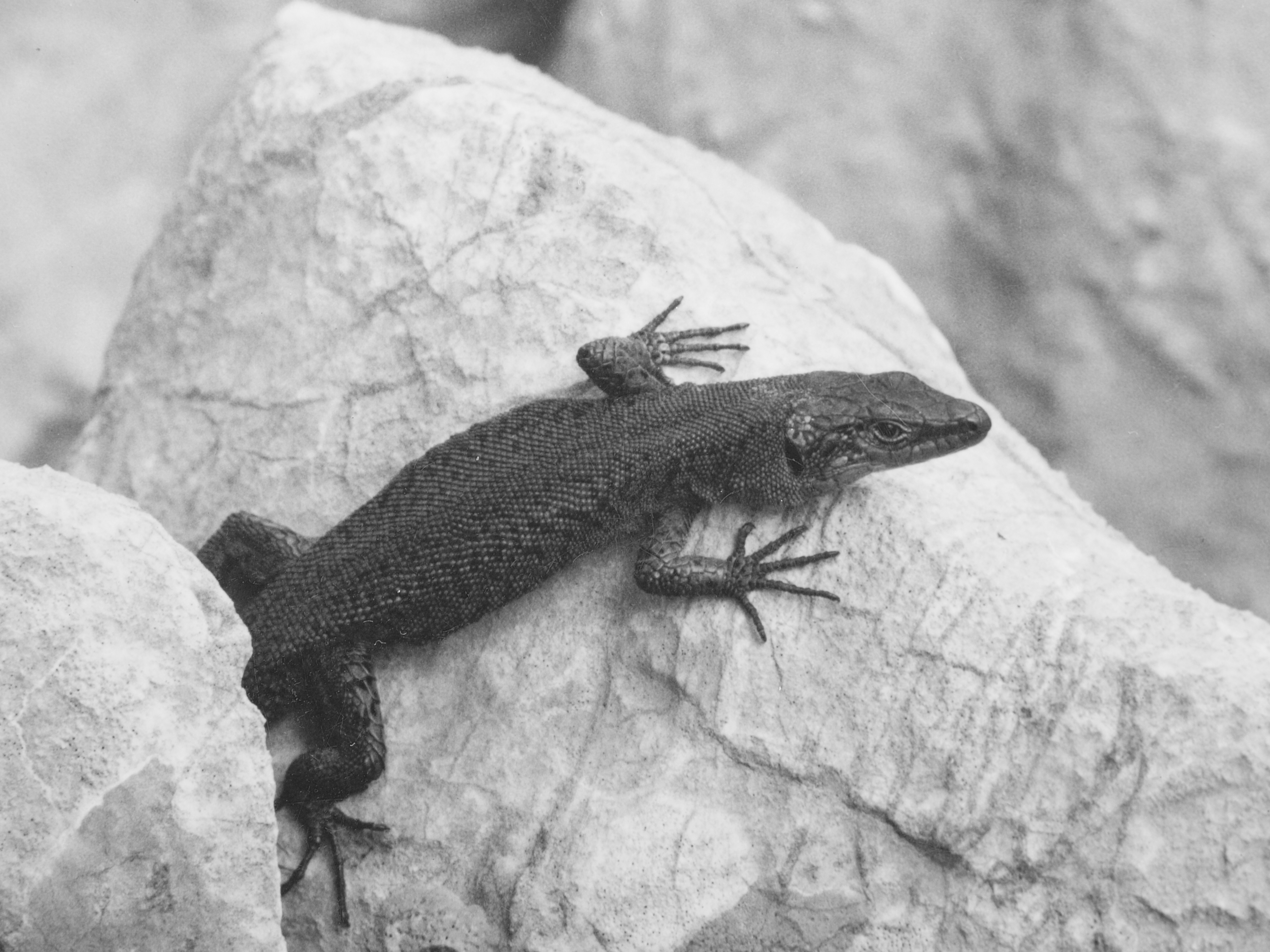
- Mosor rock lizard (Dinarolacerta mosorensis)

Scientific classification
- Kingdom: Animalia
- Phylum: Chordata
- Class: Reptilia
- Order: Squamata
- Family: Lacertidae
- Genus: Dinarolacerta; Arnold, Arribas, & Carranza, 2007

Species
- 2 species (see text)

= Dinarolacerta =

Genus of lizards

Dinarolacerta is a genus of wall lizards of the family Lacertidae. The genus is endemic to the Balkans.

== Species ==
There are two recognized species:

- Dinarolacerta montenegrina Ljubisavljević, Arribas, Džukić, & Carranza, 2007 – Prokletije rock lizard
- Dinarolacerta mosorensis (Kolombatović, 1886) – Mosor rock lizard
