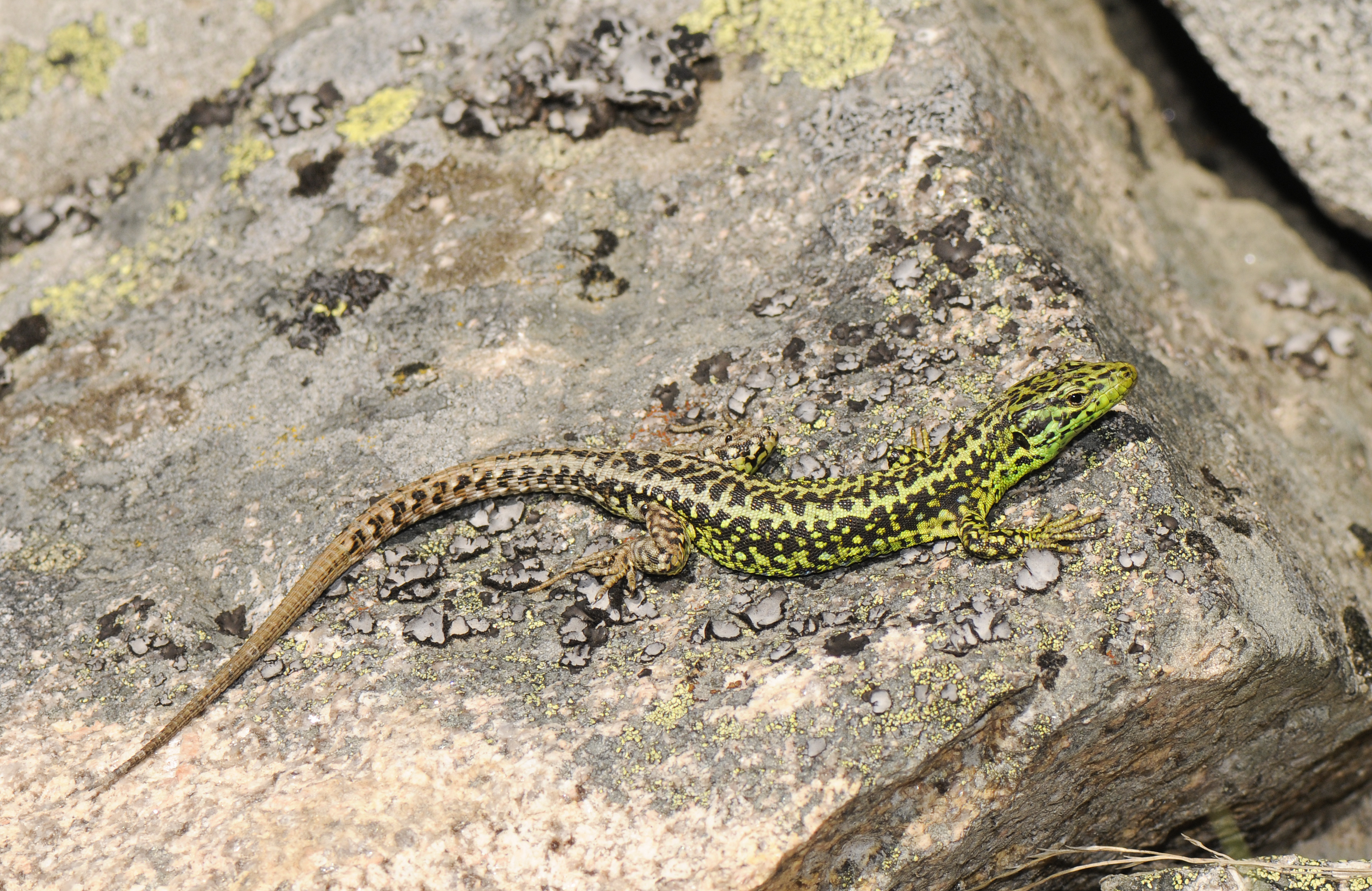
- Iberolacerta monticola

Scientific classification
- Kingdom: Animalia
- Phylum: Chordata
- Class: Reptilia
- Order: Squamata
- Family: Lacertidae
- Subfamily: Lacertinae
- Genus: Iberolacerta; Arribas, 1999

Species
- Eight, see text

= Iberolacerta =

Genus of lizards

Iberolacerta is a genus of lizards in the family Lacertidae. The genus contains at least eight described species, which are mainly found in Spain and France. I. horvathi (Horvath's rock lizard) has a wider geographic range, being distributed in Central Europe.

== Distribution ==
The species of Iberolacerta are distinct and mainly found in the western Europe mountain ranges. Iberolacerta species found in Germany could have possibly been caused by human introduction, and are thus controversial. For example, I. horvathi had been encountered in southern Germany, but has not been encountered thereafter.

== Morphological features ==
Lizards of the genus Iberolacerta have certain features in common, including a depressed head and body, 7–9 premaxillary teeth, ~26 presacral vertebrae (for males), inscriptional ribs, and tail brightly colored in hatchlings.

Some of the lizards in this genus have specific features, such as rostral and frontonasal scales, one postanal scale, supranasal and anterior loreal scales, 36 or fewer macro chromosomes, and egg-laid embryos somewhat developed.

Small species grow up to approximately 85 mm (3.3 in) in snout-to-vent length (SVL). All species have females that are larger than males.

=== Skull ===
The skull contains 7–9 premaxillary teeth, no pterygoid teeth, and a slender nasal process. In addition, there is a separation between the frontal bone and the postorbital bone.

=== Post-cranial skeleton ===
In species of the genus Iberolacerta, the number of presacral vertebrae differs according to sex. Presacral vertebrae in males can range from 25–26, while the presacral vertebrae in the larger females can range from 26–29. Both sexes also have an average of 6 posterior presacral vertebrae with relatively short ribs. The tail vertebrae can have the common A-type pattern or less common B-type pattern.

=== Coloration ===
The coloration of the dorsal side contains stripes, bands, and spots near the vertebral column. The coloration of the ventral side is white, light yellow, deep orange, or green. The tails of juveniles are often bright green or blue.

=== Chromosome counts ===
Iberolacerta species contain a diploid (2n) number of autosomes ranging from 36 and below. The sex chromosomes come in two different types, depending on the number of Z chromosomes that are species specific: ZW-type or Z1Z2W-type. The chromosomes also can contain nucleolar organizer in large macrochromosomes, termed L-type, or in a medium macrochromosome, termed M-type.

=== Ecology ===
These lizards tend to be found as solid surface rock dwellers, but can be found associated with small loose stones.

== Species ==
- Iberolacerta aranica (Arribas, 1993) – Aran rock lizard

I. aranica is found in the central Pyrenees of France and Spain, in rocky alpine habitats. The population trend of this species is decreasing. Image.

- Iberolacerta aurelioi (Arribas, 1994) – Aurelio's rock lizard

I. aurelioi is found in the Pyrenees Mountains on the border of Andorra, France, and Spain. This species has a population size that ranges from approximately 10–200 individuals. The population trend for this species is decreasing. Image.

- Iberolacerta bonnali (Lantz, 1927) – Pyrenean rock lizard

I. bonnali is found in the central Pyrenean Mountains of France and Spain. Populations are present in suitable habitats and fragmented in unsuitable habitats. The population trend of this species is stable. Image.

- Iberolacerta cyreni (L. Müller & Hellmich, 1937) – Cyren's rock lizard

I. cyreni is found in the central mountains of Spain in the Sierra de Bejar, Sierra de Gredos, La Serrota, and Sierra del Guadarrama. Populations of this species are common in particular areas. The population trend for this species is decreasing. Image.

- Iberolacerta galani Arribas, Carranza & Odierna, 2006 – Leonese rock lizard

I. galani is found in the Spain regions of Sierra Segundera, Sierra de la Cabrera, Sierra del Eje or Peña Trevinca, and Sierra del Teleno Oscar. The populations of this species are copious. The population trend of this species is unknown. Image.

- Iberolacerta horvathi (Méhelÿ, 1904) – Horvath's rock lizard

I. horvathi is found in the mountain ranges of southern Austria, northeastern Italy, western Slovenia, and western Croatia. Populations of this species are locally copious. The population trend for this species is stable. Image.

- Iberolacerta martinezricai (Arribas, 1996) – Martinez-Rica's rock lizard

I. martinezricai is found in the Spain region of Sierra Segundera, Salamanca. The populations of this species are very rare since most populations are located at the peak of the mountain. The population trend of this species is decreasing. Image.

- Iberolacerta monticola (Boulenger, 1905) – Iberian rock lizard

I. monticola is found in the Spain region of the Cantabrian Mountains and Galicia, and also is found in the central Portugal region of Serra de Estrela. The populations of this species occur when habitats are suitable, although they are very localized. The population trend of this species is decreasing. Image.

== Evolution ==
Speciation theory caused by mountain ranges and Pleistocene glacial cycles: It is believed that many of the Iberolacerta genus led the speciation seen today, because of the Pleistocene glacial cycles and Holocene habitat fragmentation. For example, I. monticola has been studied to determine its cause of speciation. There was an analysis of 17 I. monticola population's mitochondrial DNA sequences, at a control region and cytochrome b loci, throughout the northwestern quadrant of the Iberian Peninsula. The results these researchers' data gathered led to the conclusion that correlated to a "refugia within refugia" model since the comparative phylogeographic analyses had shown consistent genetic subdivisions patterns. This suggested that the mountain ranges could potentially be the cause of the descending species of Iberolacerta. It was also hypothesized that the Holocene epoch represented a long-term survival inflexion point for the derived species not to survive the preceding glacial cycle.

== Reproduction ==
During copulation, the male bites and latches onto the flanks of the females, allowing the fertilization of ~3–10 eggs. In newly laid eggs, the embryos are somewhat developed, and range, depending on species, from ~23 to 36 days until hatching.
