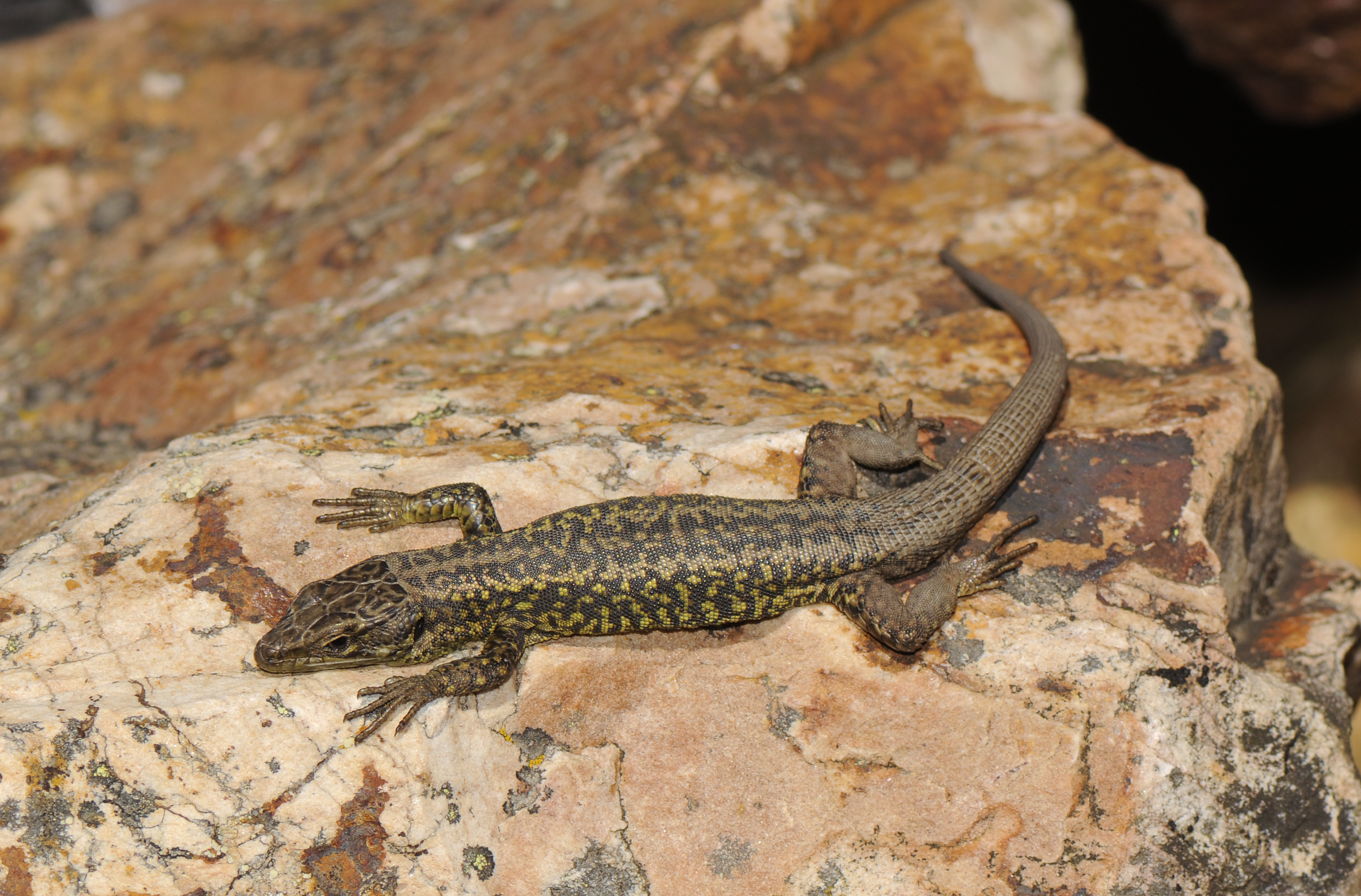

Conservation status
- Critically Endangered (IUCN 3.1)

Scientific classification
- Kingdom: Animalia
- Phylum: Chordata
- Class: Reptilia
- Order: Squamata
- Family: Lacertidae
- Genus: Iberolacerta
- Species: I. martinezricai

Binomial name
- Iberolacerta martinezricai (Arribas, 1996)
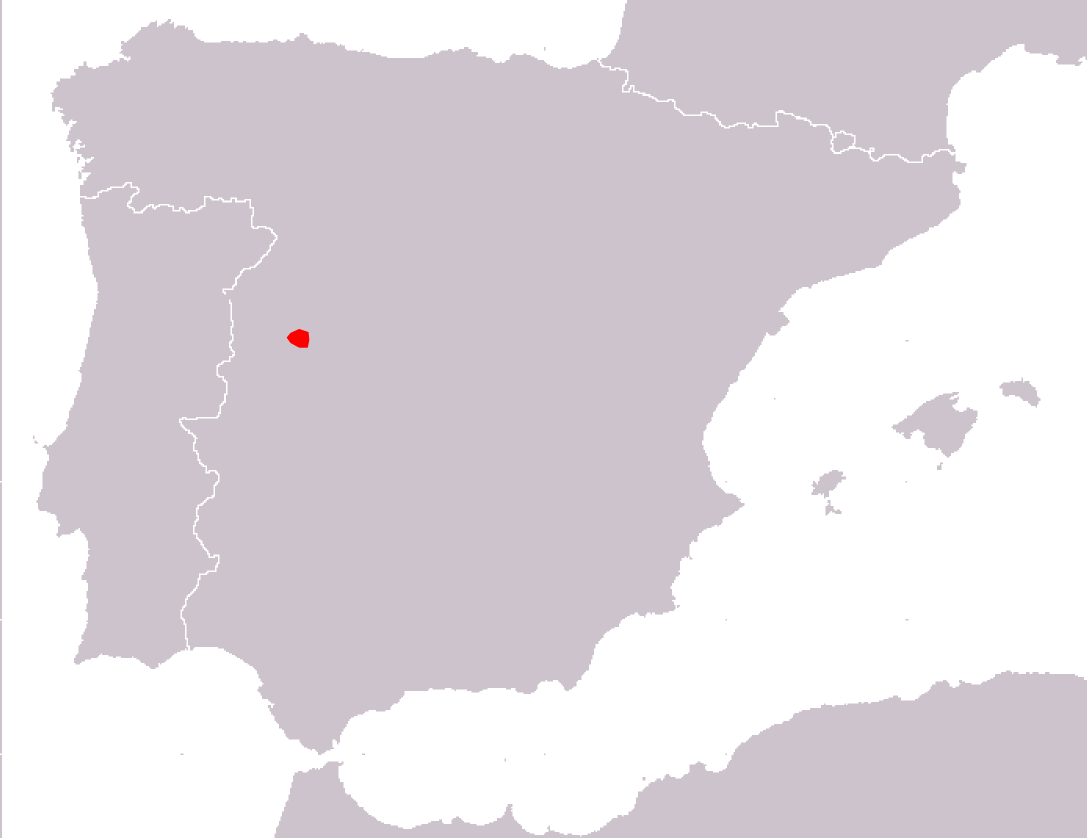

Synonyms
- Lacerta cyreni martinezricai Arribas, 1996; Iberolacerta cyreni martinezricai — Mayer & Arribas, 2003; Iberolacerta monticola martinezricai — Crochet et al., 2004; Iberolacerta martinezricai — Arribas & Carranza, 2004

= Iberolacerta martinezricai =

Species of lizard

Iberolacerta martinezricai, also known commonly as Martinez-Rica's rock lizard and the Pena de Francia rock lizard, is a species of lizard in the family Lacertidae. The species is endemic to Spain.

== Etymology ==
The specific name, martinezricai, is in honor of Spanish herpetologist Juan Pablo Martínez-Rica.

== Geographic range ==
Iberolacerta martinezricai is found in western Spain, in the Sierra de Francia in Salamanca Province.

== Habitat ==
The natural habitats of Iberolacerta martinezricai are temperate forests and rocky areas, at altitudes of 800–1,723 m (2,625–5,653 ft).

== Reproduction ==
Iberolacerta martinezricai is oviparous.

== Conservation status ==
Iberolacerta martinezricai is threatened by habitat loss.
