= Zootoca carniolica =

Conservation status
- Least Concern (IUCN 3.1)

Scientific classification
- Kingdom: Animalia
- Phylum: Chordata
- Class: Reptilia
- Order: Squamata
- Family: Lacertidae
- Genus: Zootoca
- Species: Z. carniolica

Binomial name
- Zootoca carniolica Mayer, Böhme, Tiedemann, & Bischoff, 2000

Species of lizard

Zootoca carniolica is a species of lizard in the family Lacertidae. It is found in southern Europe, in Slovenia, Italy, Austria, Switzerland, and Croatia.
