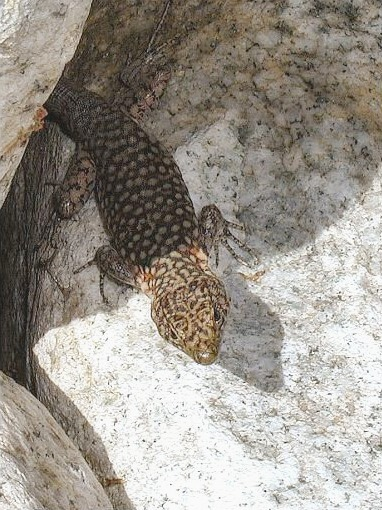

Conservation status
- Near Threatened (IUCN 3.1)

Scientific classification
- Kingdom: Animalia
- Phylum: Chordata
- Class: Reptilia
- Order: Squamata
- Family: Lacertidae
- Genus: Archaeolacerta; Mertens, 1921
- Species: A. bedriagae

Binomial name
- Archaeolacerta bedriagae (Camerano, 1885)

Synonyms
- Lacerta oxycephala bedriagae Camerano, 1885; Lacerta (Archaeolacerta) bedriagae — Mertens, 1921; Archaeolacerta bedriagae — Lanza et al., 1984

= Bedriaga's rock lizard =

Species of lizard

Bedriaga's rock lizard (Archaeolacerta bedriagae) is a species of lizard in the family Lacertidae. The species is monotypic within the genus Archaeolacerta. It is only found on the islands Corsica and Sardinia. The scientific name Lacerta bedriagae is also used. There are three recognized subspecies.

== Etymology ==
Both the common name and the specific name, bedriagae, are in honor of Russian-born herpetologist Jacques von Bedriaga.

== Habitat ==
The natural habitats of A. bedriagae are temperate forests, temperate shrubland, Mediterranean-type shrubby vegetation, rivers, rocky areas, pastureland, and rural gardens.

== Conservation status ==
A. bedriagae is threatened by habitat loss. This rare species is protected by CITES.

== Description ==
Outside the mating season, adults of A. bedriagae are brownish-grey with a dark, fine-lined net pattern on their backs. The female is browner than the male, and the male in mating season acquires a blue belly, blue loins, and blue dots on the flanks. The netlike pattern seems to turn into a pattern of white dots. Juveniles are discernible by their bright azure blue tails. The adult males can grow to a total length (including tail) of up to 30 cm (12 in). However most specimen do not get longer than 25 cm (9.8 in) in total length.

== Ecology ==
Bedriaga's rock lizard climbs vertical rocks, cliffs, walls and ruins. The species is found in mountainous regions, mostly between 600 and 1,000 m (2,000 and 3,300 ft) above sea level, but it is also found along the coast, sunbathing near small streams. When frightened, it sometimes tries to escape in the water, and it is a good swimmer. Its diet consists of insects and other small invertebrates. Peculiar to this lizard, it jumps off the ground often to catch flying insects. Most other Lacertidae cannot make high jumps to catch their prey.

== Subspecies ==
Three subspecies are recognized as being valid, including the nominotypical subspecies.

- Archeolacerta bedriagae bedriagae (Camerano, 1885) – Corsica
- Archeolacerta bedriagae paessleri (Mertens, 1927) – Sardinia
- Archeolacerta bedriagae sardoa (Peracca, 1903) – Sardinia

== See also ==
- List of reptiles of Italy
