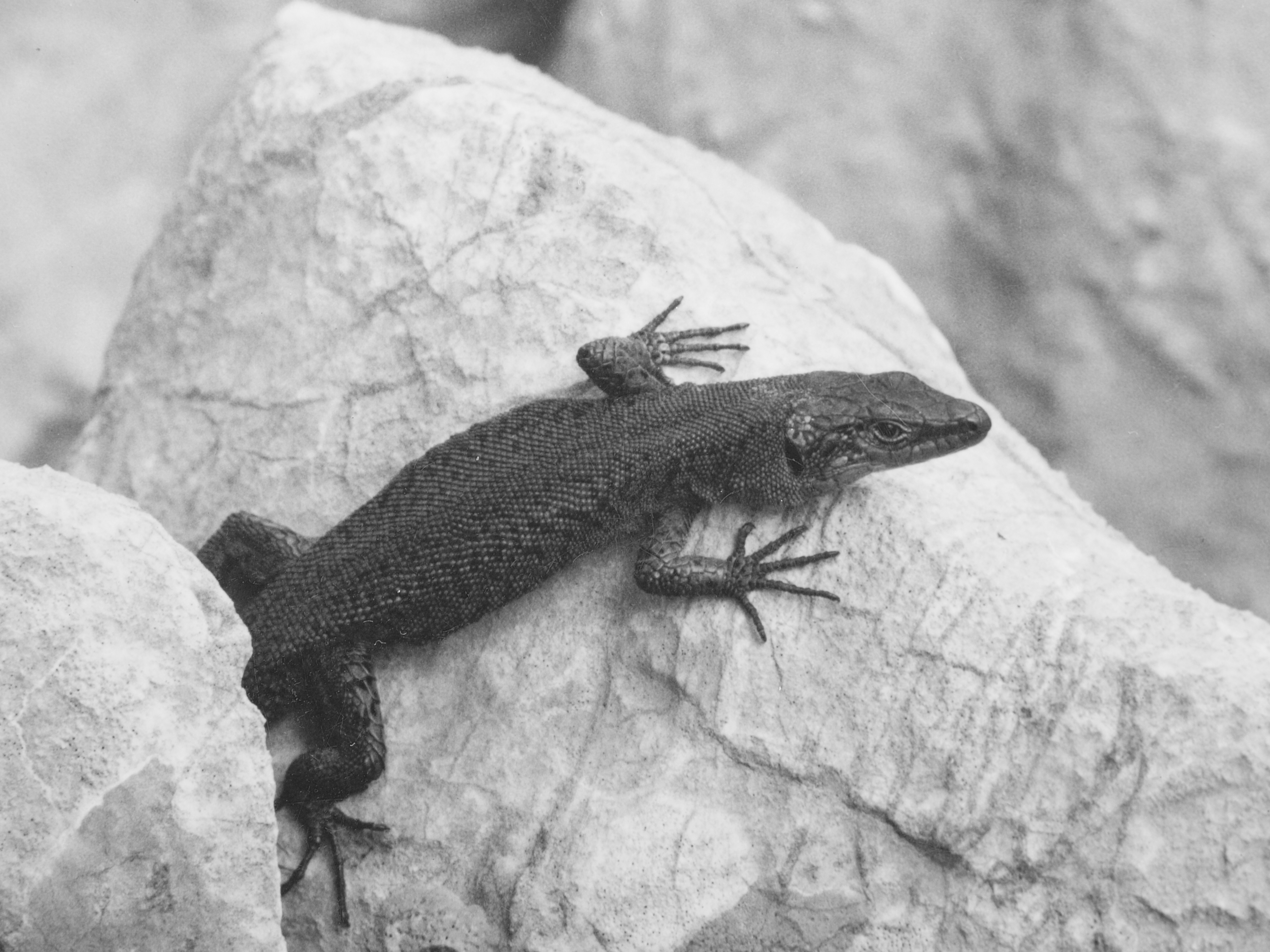

Conservation status
- Vulnerable (IUCN 3.1)

Scientific classification
- Kingdom: Animalia
- Phylum: Chordata
- Class: Reptilia
- Order: Squamata
- Suborder: Lacertoidea
- Family: Lacertidae
- Genus: Dinarolacerta
- Species: D. mosorensis

Binomial name
- Dinarolacerta mosorensis (Kolombatović, 1886)

Synonyms
- Lacerta mosorensis; Archaeolacerta mosorensis

= Mosor rock lizard =

Species of lizard

The Mosor rock lizard (Dinarolacerta mosorensis) is a species of lizard in the family Lacertidae. It is found in southern Croatia, Bosnia and Herzegovina, and Montenegro. Its possible presence in Albania requires confirmation. It is named after its type locality, Mount Mosor.

== Description ==
The Mosor rock lizard is a flattened lizard with a long head and slender tail. It grows to a snout-to-vent length of about 7 cm (2.8 in) with a tail approximately twice as long. The dorsal surface is somewhat glossy and is brown, greyish-brown or olive-brown with darker mottling and speckling. The flanks are usually darker in colour and the spotting may be restricted to the mid-dorsal area. The underparts are unspotted and usually yellow or orange in adults but may be white or grey. Juveniles have pale bellies and sometimes bluish tails.

== Behaviour ==
The Mosor rock lizard is usually found in high rainfall areas at altitudes of between 450 and 1,900 metres (1,480 and 6,230 ft). Its typical habitat is limestone outcrops or karst regions above the treeline. It also occurs on juniper-clad slopes, in open woodland and around springs. Females lay a single clutch of about four eggs once a year. The eggs are retained within the female for about five weeks after mating and hatch about two and a half weeks later. The juveniles are less than 3 cm (1.2 in) long when they hatch and have very long tails.

== Status ==
The Mosor rock lizard has a total area of occupancy of less than 2,000 square kilometres (770 sq mi) and occurs as a number of separate populations. The extent of its habitat is declining due to logging. It is generally uncommon within its range and the International Union for Conservation of Nature has assessed its conservation status as being "vulnerable.
