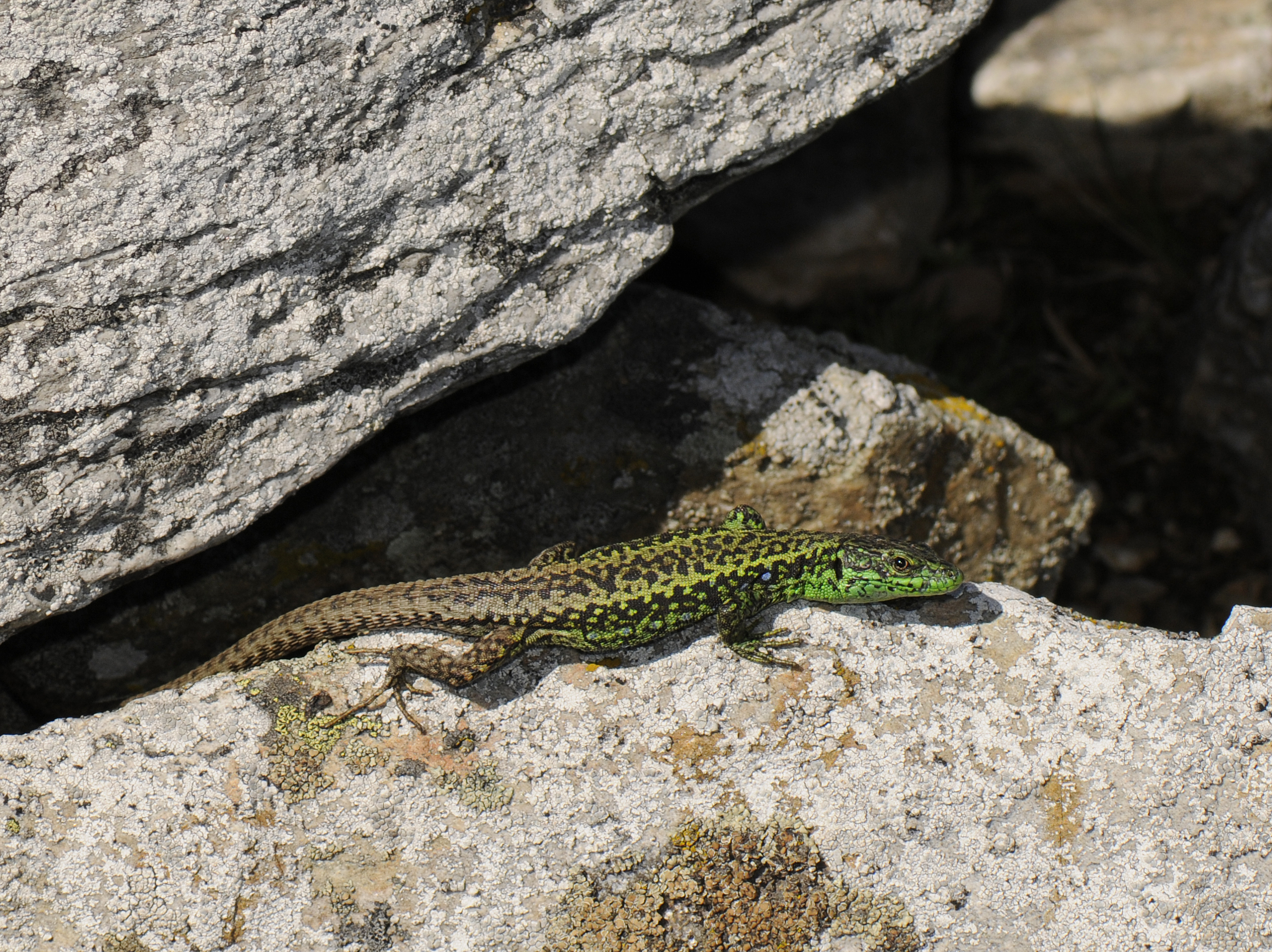

Conservation status
- Near Threatened (IUCN 3.1)

Scientific classification
- Kingdom: Animalia
- Phylum: Chordata
- Class: Reptilia
- Order: Squamata
- Family: Lacertidae
- Genus: Iberolacerta
- Species: I. galani

Binomial name
- Iberolacerta galani Arribas, Carranza & Odierna, 2006
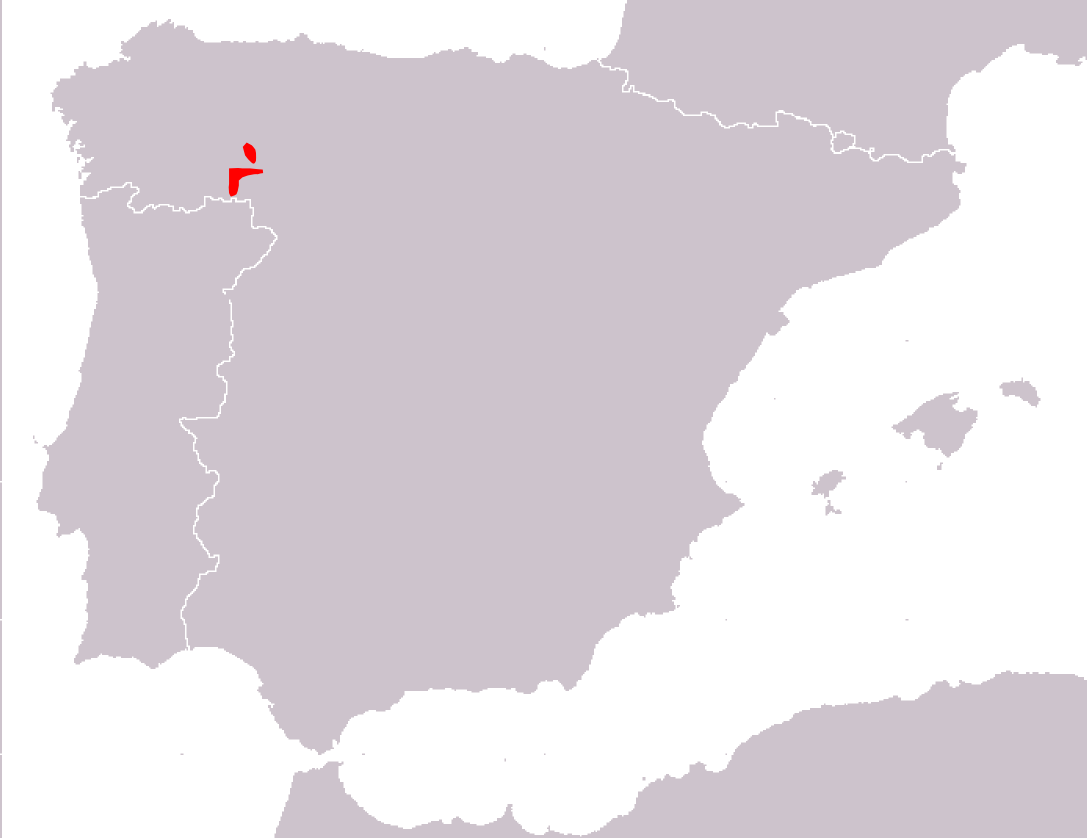
- Distribution of the Leonese rock lizard.

= Leonese rock lizard =

Species of gecko

The Leonese rock lizard (Iberolacerta galani), also known as Galan's rock lizard, is a species of lizard in the family Lacertidae. The species is indigenous to Spain.

== Geographic range ==
The species I. galani is endemic to the Montes de León in northwestern Spain.

== Etymology ==
Its specific name, galani, honors the Corunnan herpetologist Dr. Pedro Galán Regalado for his lifelong dedication to the study of the Iberian herpetofauna and natural history in general.

== Description ==
This species, I. galani, is characterized by its relatively large size. It is the biggest species of Iberolacerta with females reaching 84 mm (3.3 in) snout-to-vent length (SVL). It is also characterized by a high number of blue ocelli on the shoulders, and the relatively frequent contact or near-contact between the supranasal and the first loreal scale.

== Habitat ==
The Leonese rock lizard inhabits rocky supraforestal (above the tree line) habitats, at 1,000–2,000 m (3,300–6,600 ft), with a high-mountain climate.

== Behavior ==
As a heliothermic lizard, I.galani relies on basking to regulate its body temperature.Seasonal shifts in thermal preferences have been observed in I. galani, allowing it to maintain effective thermoregulation throughout the year.

== Reproduction ==
I. galani is oviparous.
