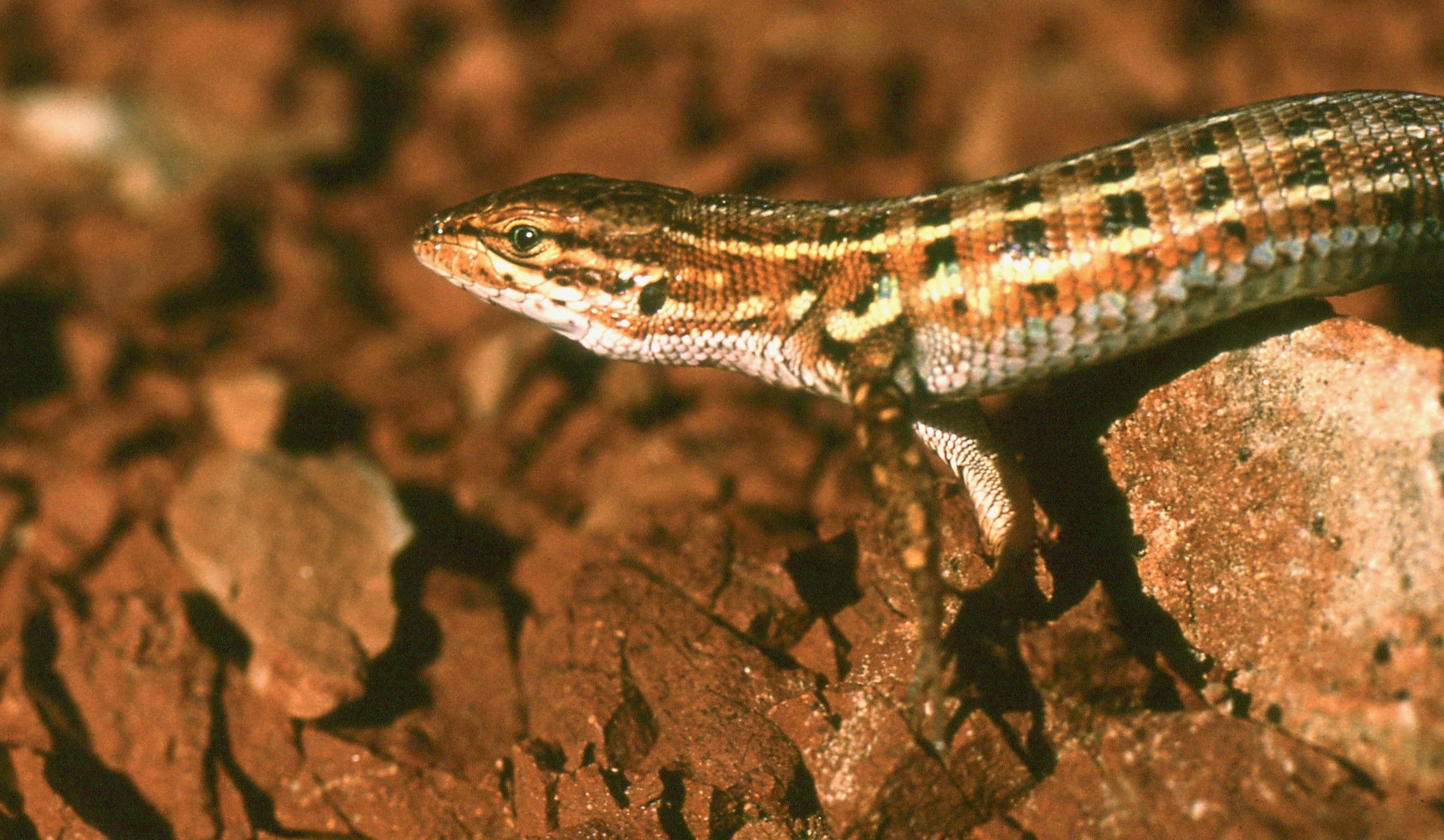

Scientific classification
- Domain: Eukaryota
- Kingdom: Animalia
- Phylum: Chordata
- Class: Reptilia
- Order: Squamata
- Family: Lacertidae
- Genus: Psammodromus
- Species: P. edwarsianus

Binomial name
- Psammodromus edwarsianus (Dugès, 1829)

= East Iberian sand racer =

Species of lizard

The East Iberian sand racer or East Iberian psammodromus (Psammodromus edwarsianus) is a species of lizards in the family Lacertidae. It is found in Spain and France.

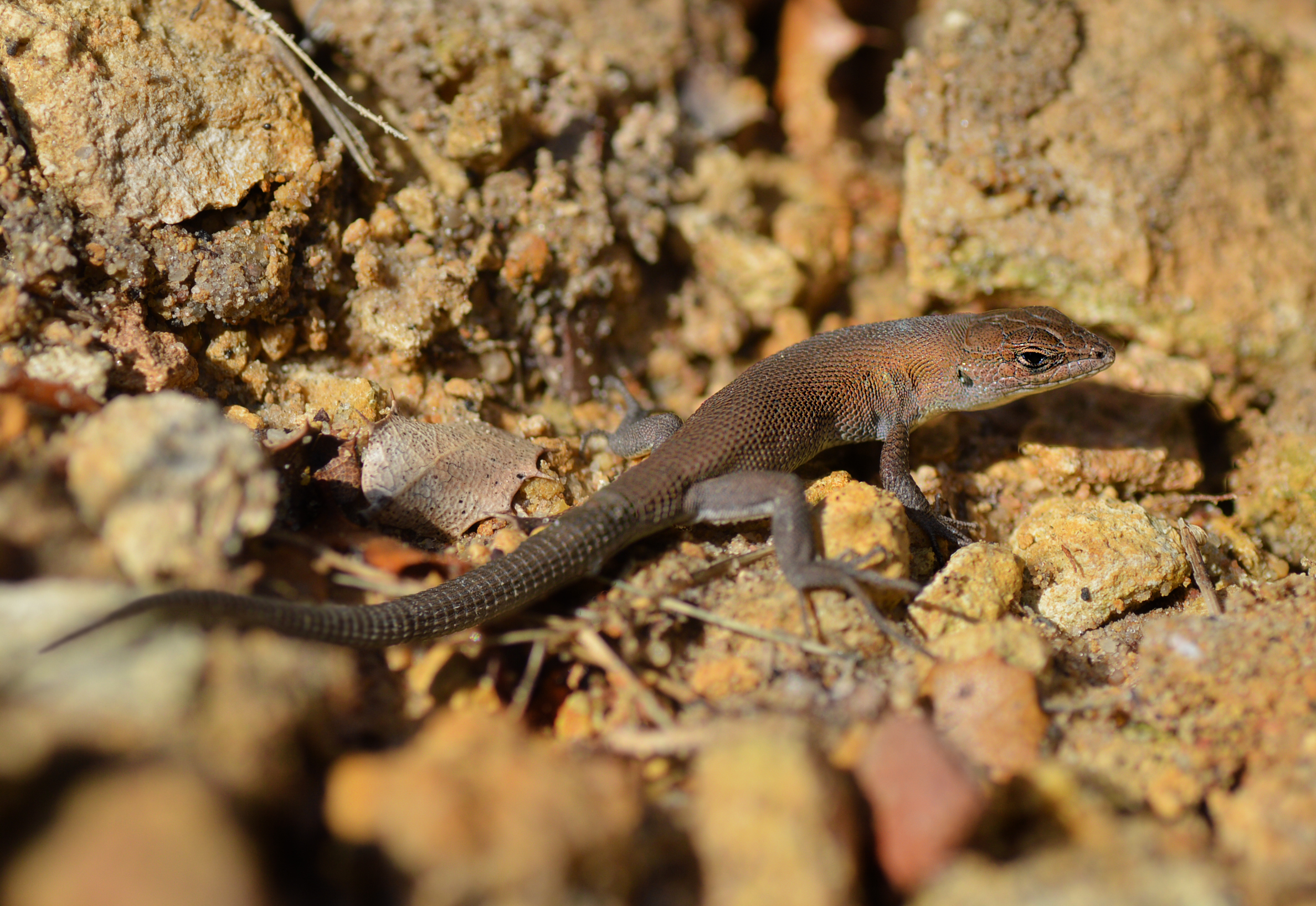
