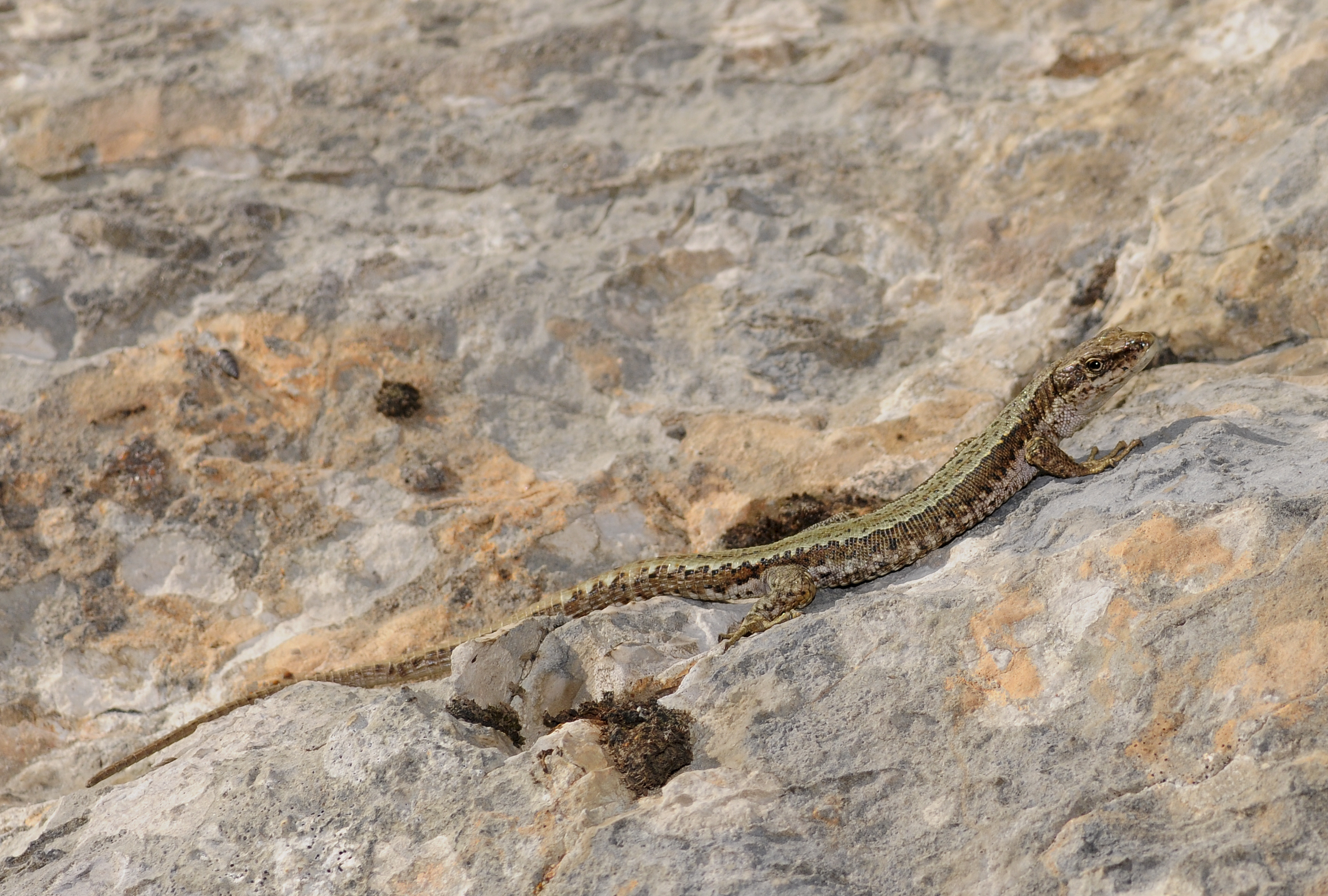

Conservation status
- Near Threatened (IUCN 3.1)

Scientific classification
- Kingdom: Animalia
- Phylum: Chordata
- Class: Reptilia
- Order: Squamata
- Family: Lacertidae
- Genus: Iberolacerta
- Species: I. horvathi

Binomial name
- Iberolacerta horvathi (Méhelÿ, 1904)

Synonyms
- Lacerta horvathi Méhelÿ, 1904; Iberolacerta horvathi — Arribas, 1997

= Horvath's rock lizard =

Species of lizard

Horvath's rock lizard (Iberolacerta horvathi) is a species of lizard in the family Lacertidae. The species is endemic to Europe. Until 1997, this species had been assigned to the genus Lacerta, the same genus as the morphologically similar sand lizard (Lacerta agilis). The natural habitats of I. horvathi are temperate forests and shrublands, and rocky areas.

== Etymology ==
The specific name, horvathi is in honor of Hungarian entomologist Géza Horváth.

== Conservation status ==
The geographic range of I. horvathi in central and southern Europe, in mountainous areas of southern Austria, northeastern Italy, western Slovenia, and western Croatia, is fragmented, and believed to be a relict of a much larger range during the last ice age. The small, fragmented range of this species is the main cause of concern for the survival of this species, which is why it is given Near threatened status in the IUCN Red List and is also legally protected in the countries in which it lives.

== Description ==
Horvath's rock lizard grows to a snout-to-vent length (SVL) of 6.5 cm (2.6 in). It has a blunt snout and is dorso-ventrally flattened. The upper surface is pale greyish-brown contrasting sharply with the dark brown sides and the unspotted white or yellowish belly. There is sometimes a thin faint dark line along part of the spine or some dark speckles. The young lizards are similarly coloured but often have a greyish-green tail.

== Geographic range ==
Horvath's rock lizard is native to northwestern Croatia, Slovenia and the adjoining parts of northeastern Italy and southern Austria. It has also been reported to be present in southern Germany. It may be under-reported because of its close resemblance to the more common wall lizard Podarcis muralis with which it co-exists in the lower part of its altitudinal range.

== Habitat ==
The typical habitats of I. horvathi are cliffs, rocky outcrops, karst pavements, boulder fields, alpine scrub, damp open woodland, embankments, and bridges. It is normally found at altitudes of 500 to 2,000 m (1,640 to 6,562 ft), usually between 800 and 1,200 m (2,625 and 3,937 ft).

== Behaviour ==
I. horvathi is very much a rock specialist and is very agile, even leaping into the air to catch prey. It prefers humid environments and may even be active under cloudy conditions.

== Diet ==
Horvath's rock lizard feeds on a range of small invertebrates including flying forms.

== Reproduction ==
Females of I. horvathi lay small clutches of four or five eggs which hatch after five to six weeks. The newly hatched young are about 2.5 cm (1 in) long from snout-to-vent and become mature at about two years of age.
