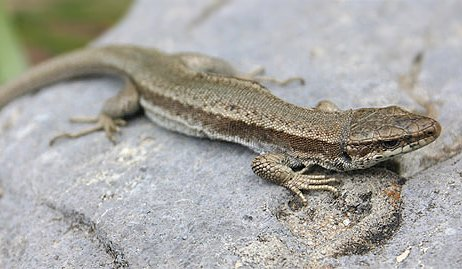
- in Ordesa y Monte Perdido National Park

Conservation status
- Near Threatened (IUCN 3.1)

Scientific classification
- Kingdom: Animalia
- Phylum: Chordata
- Class: Reptilia
- Order: Squamata
- Family: Lacertidae
- Genus: Iberolacerta
- Species: I. bonnali

Binomial name
- Iberolacerta bonnali (Lantz, 1927)
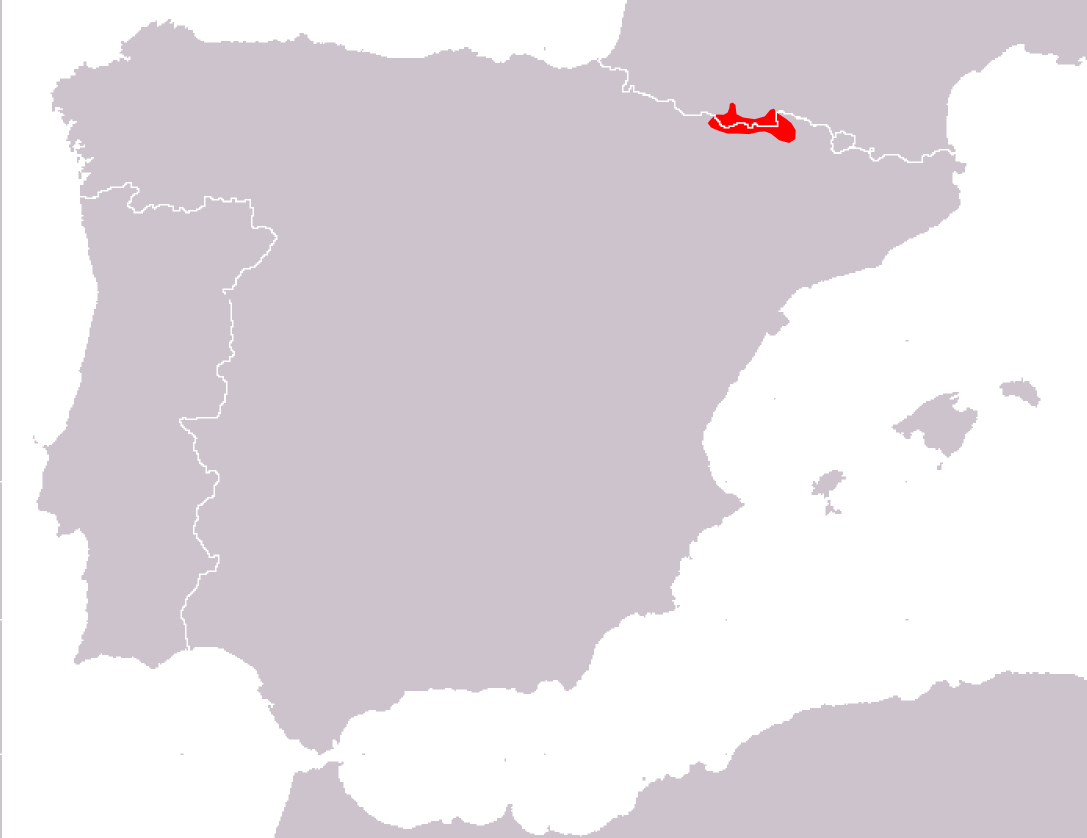

Synonyms
- Lacerta monticola bonnali Lantz, 1927; Iberolacerta (Pyrenesaura) bonnali — Arribas, 1987; Lacerta (Iberolacerta) bonnali — Carranza et al., 2004; Iberolacerta bonnali — Arnold et al., 2007

= Pyrenean rock lizard =

Species of lizard

The Pyrenean rock lizard (Iberolacerta bonnali) is a species of lizard in the family Lacertidae. The species is endemic to the Pyrenees, where it occurs at high altitudes and is only active in summer.

== Etymology and taxonomy ==
The specific name, bonnali, is in honor of the Count of Bonnal who collected amphibians and reptiles while living at Montgaillard, Hautes-Pyrénées. The Aran rock lizard was initially included here as a subspecies, Iberolacerta bonnali aranica, but is now considered a distinct species, Iberolacerta aranica.

== Description ==
The Pyrenean rock lizard grows to a snout-to-vent length (SVL) of 6 cm (2.4 in), with a tail about twice SVL. Its dorsal colour is greyish-brown, sometimes finely flecked with dark markings but without significant striping. The flanks are dark, sometimes with slight pale flecking. The underparts are white, greyish or greenish.

== Geographic range and habitat ==
The Pyrenean rock lizard is found in France and Spain in the Pyrenees Mountains at altitudes of between 1,700 and 3,000 metres (5,600 and 9,800 ft). Its natural habitats are rocky crags and screes in limestone, slate and schist areas. It is frequently found on rocks close to alpine meadows and near torrents and glacial lakes. It is only active for a short period of the year in summer.

== Reproduction ==
I. bonnali is oviparous.

== Conservation status ==
The Pyrenean rock lizard is assessed by the International Union for Conservation of Nature as being "near threatened". This is because, although the population seems to be stable and the lizard is present in a number of national parks and protected areas, it is vulnerable to disturbance to its habitat from skiing developments, the building of tracks, and the overgrazing of cattle. It may also be affected in the future by climate change.
