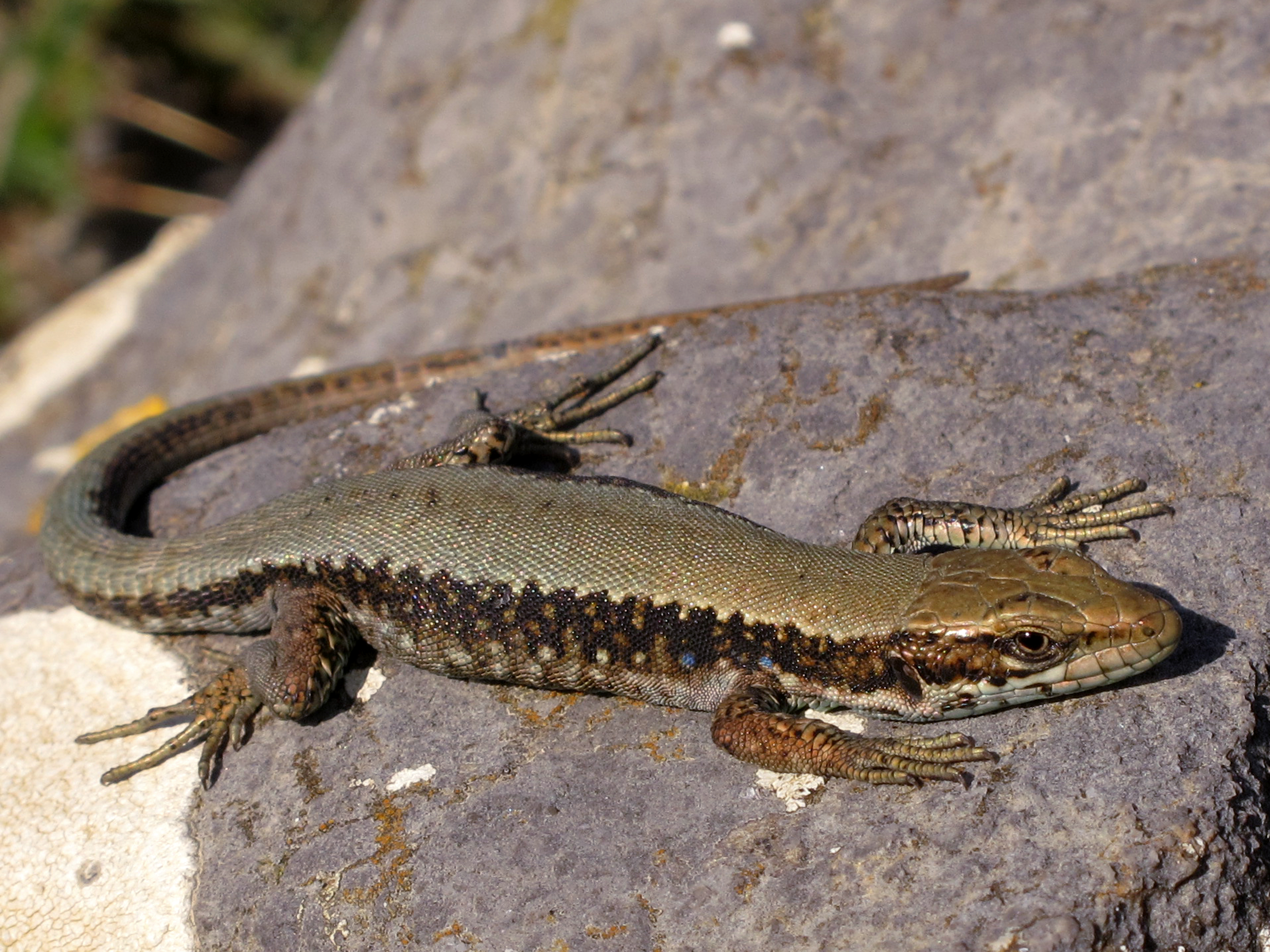

Conservation status
- Vulnerable (IUCN 3.1)

Scientific classification
- Kingdom: Animalia
- Phylum: Chordata
- Class: Reptilia
- Order: Squamata
- Family: Lacertidae
- Genus: Iberolacerta
- Species: I. monticola

Binomial name
- Iberolacerta monticola (Boulenger, 1905)
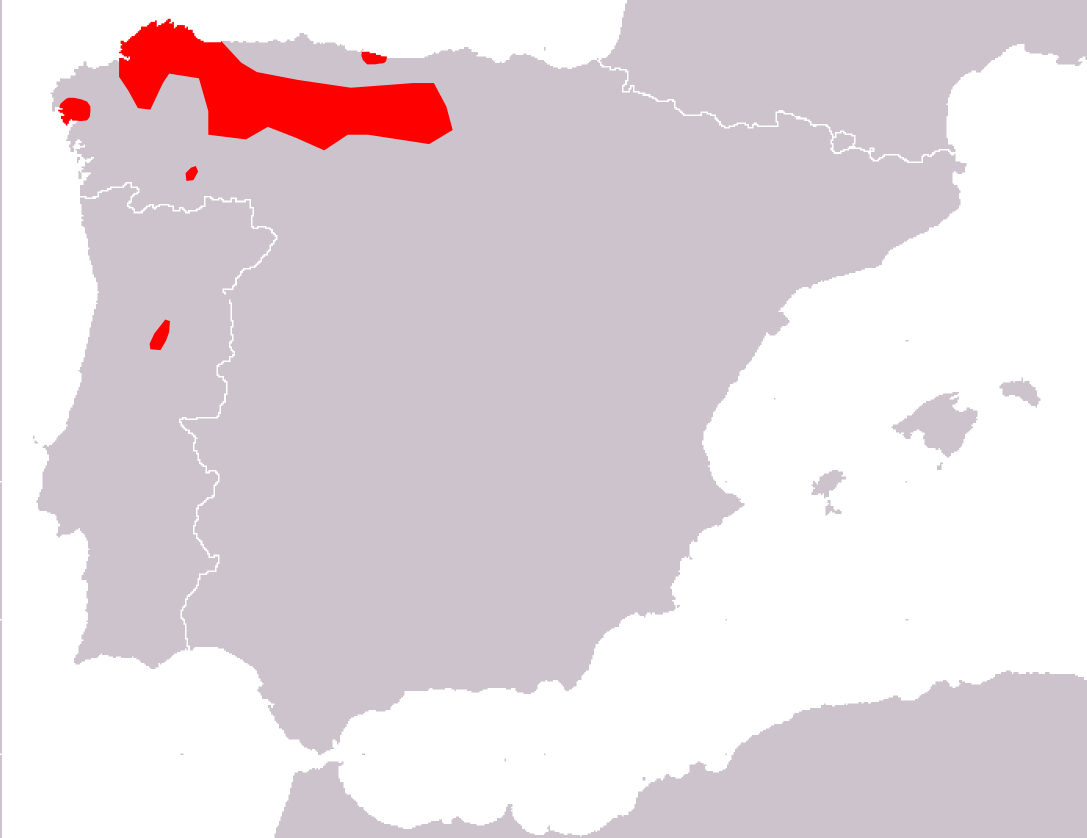

Synonyms
- Lacerta muralis Var. monticola Boulenger, 1905; Lacerta monticola — Arnold & Burton, 1978; Archaeolacerta monticola — Arribas, 1996; Iberolacerta monticola — Arribas, 1997

= Iberian rock lizard =

Species of lizard

The Iberian rock lizard (Iberolacerta monticola) is a species of lizard in the family Lacertidae. The species is endemic to Portugal and Spain. Its natural habitats are mountain forests, shrubland, rivers and rocky areas. It is threatened by habitat loss.

== Description ==
The Iberian rock lizard measures about 8 cm (3 in) from snout to vent with a long, slender tail twice as long again. It is somewhat flattened with finely boned, short limbs. The colour varies in different parts of its range. The general colour is a light brown/green color variously patterned with longitudinal bands of colour or longitudinal rows of dots and small patches. Unlike some other wall lizards, the stripe along the spine is less dark than other bands. Most, but not all, individuals have a distinctive green belly and the juveniles may have blue tails. A 2008 field study reported the underparts of Iberian rock lizards turn green with maturity, and the upperparts gradually turn green as the lizard ages further.

== Distribution and habitat ==
The Iberian rock lizard is found in the Cantabrian Mountains and in Galicia in northwest Spain, and also in the Sierra de Gredos in Central Spain and Serra da Estrela in central Portugal. It occurs at sea level in Galicia, but elsewhere is seldom found below an altitude of 1,000 m (3,281 ft) and up to 2,000 m (6,562 ft) above sea level in the mountains. It favours damp places among boulders in scrubby areas, and in Galicia, it is found in low-level woodlands. It is a cold-resistant species, often found above the tree line in areas where the winters are long and the summers wet or misty. Where its range overlaps that of the common wall lizard (Podarcis muralis), it is found at higher altitudes and it climbs higher up cliffs.

== Reproduction ==
Male Iberian rock lizards are often territorial in the breeding season. The eggs, laid by sexually mature females under stones or in other concealed locations, are about 10 to 15 mm (0.39 to 0.59 in) long. The young hatch out after about six to eight weeks and mature in about two years. A 2008 field study found females mate with males with more green on their bodies.

== Status ==
The Iberian rock lizard is listed as vulnerable in the IUCN Red List of Threatened Species, because of fragmentation of its range and threats to its habitat posed by agriculture, forestry activities and tourism. Where conditions are suitable, it can be quite common, but other populations are declining in size.

== Subspecies ==
Three subspecies of Iberolacerta monticola are recognized as valid, including the nominotypical subspecies.

- Iberolacerta monticola astur Arribas et al., 2014
- Iberolacerta monticola cantabrica (Mertens, 1929)
- Iberolacerta monticola monticola (Boulenger, 1905)

Nota bene: A trinomial authority in parentheses indicates that the subspecies was originally described in a genus other than Iberolacerta.
