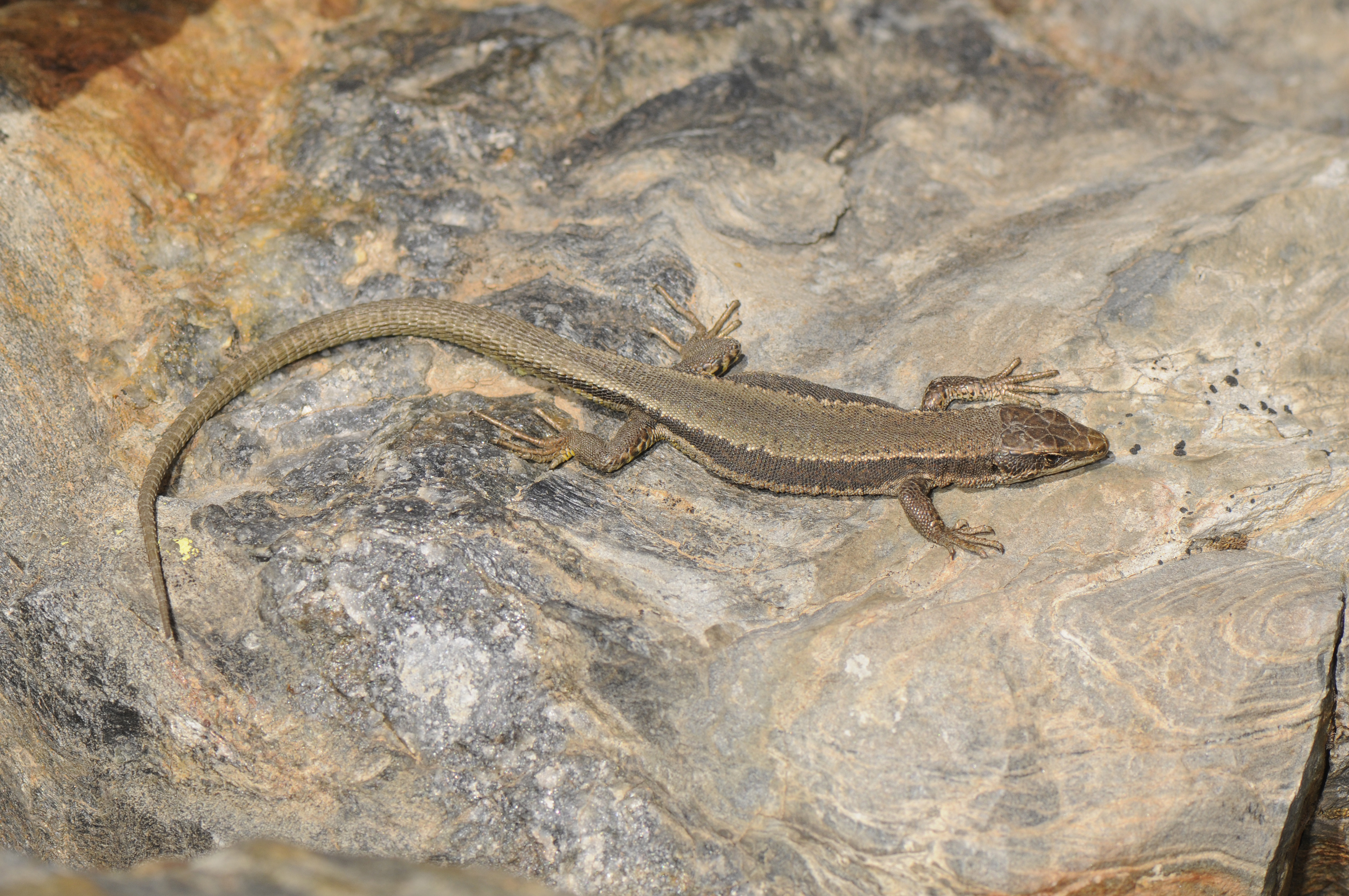

Conservation status
- Endangered (IUCN 3.1)

Scientific classification
- Kingdom: Animalia
- Phylum: Chordata
- Class: Reptilia
- Order: Squamata
- Family: Lacertidae
- Genus: Iberolacerta
- Species: I. aurelioi

Binomial name
- Iberolacerta aurelioi (Arribas, 1994)
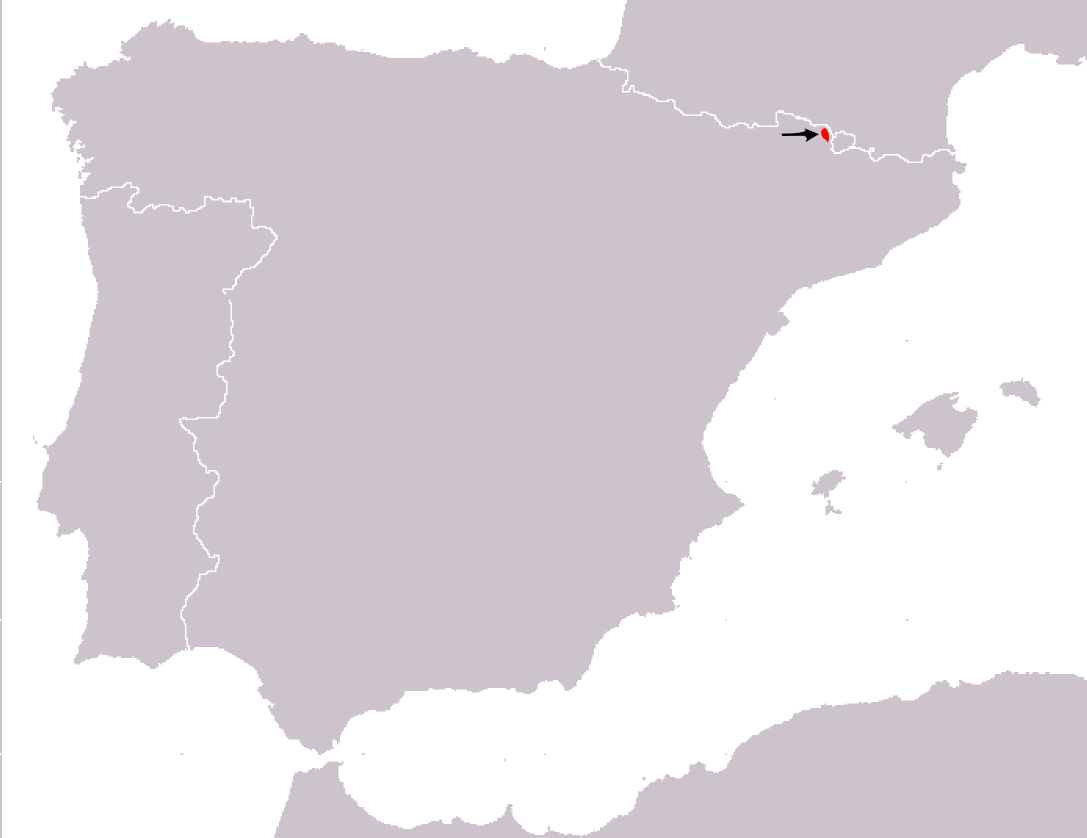

Synonyms
- Lacerta (Archaeolacerta) aurelioi Arribas, 1994; Iberolacerta (Pyrenesaura) aurelioi — Arribas, 1997; Iberolacerta aurelioi — Arnold et al., 2007

= Aurelio's rock lizard =

Species of lizard

Aurelio's rock lizard (Iberolacerta aurelioi) is a species of lizard in the family Lacertidae. The species is endemic to the Iberian Peninsula.

== Etymology ==
The specific name, aurelioi, is in honor of Aurelio Arribas, the father of the original describer of this species, Oscar J. Arribas.

== Geographic range ==
I. aurelioi is found in a small area near the confluence of Andorra, Spain and France.

== Habitat ==
The natural habitats of I. aurelioi are temperate grassland, rocky areas, and pastureland, at altitudes of 2,100–2,940 m (6,890–9,650 ft).

== Description ==
A small species, I. aurelioi may attain a snout-to-vent length (SVL) of 6 cm (2.4 in).

== Reproduction ==
I. aurelioi is oviparous.

== Conservation status ==
I. aurelioi is threatened by habitat loss.
