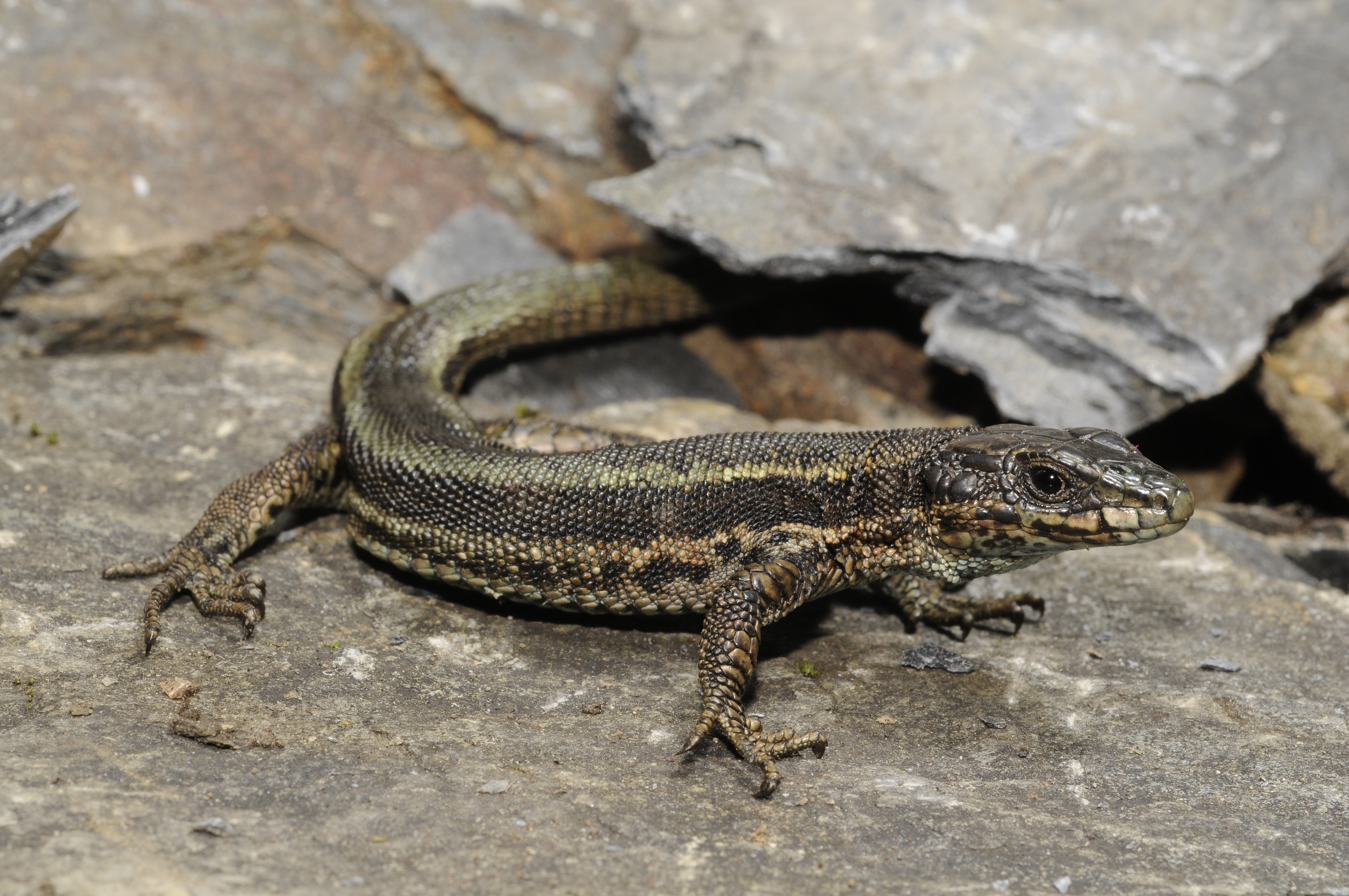

Conservation status
- Endangered (IUCN 3.1)

Scientific classification
- Kingdom: Animalia
- Phylum: Chordata
- Class: Reptilia
- Order: Squamata
- Family: Lacertidae
- Genus: Iberolacerta
- Species: I. aranica

Binomial name
- Iberolacerta aranica (Arribas, 1993)
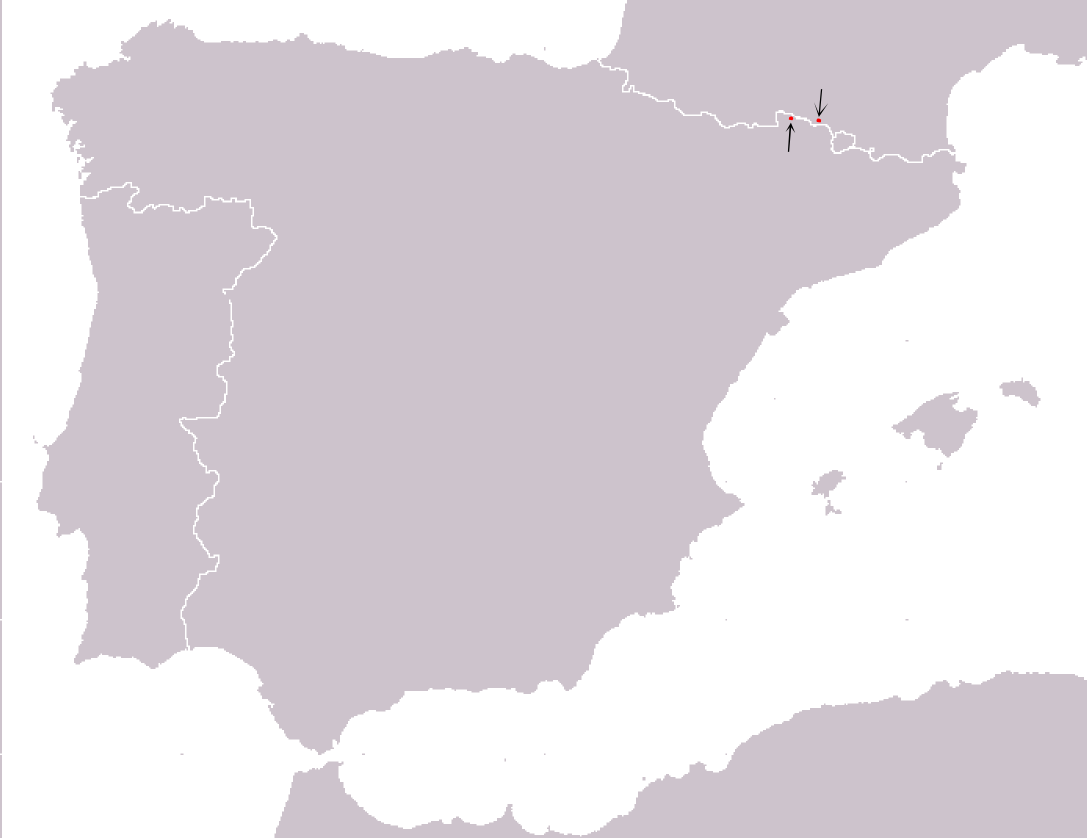

Synonyms
- Lacerta bonnali aranica Arribas, 1993; Iberolacerta (Pyrenesaura) aranica — Arribas, 1997; Lacerta (Iberolacerta) aranica — Carranza et al., 2004; Iberolacerta aranica — Arnold et al., 2007

= Aran rock lizard =

Species of lizard

The Aran rock lizard (Iberolacerta aranica) is a species of lizard in the family Lacertidae.

== Geographic range ==
I. aranica is found in a small area of the central Pyrenees on the Spanish-French border. It lives only in Mauberme massif, including its foothills between the Val d'Aran in Spain and the Ariège in France.

== Habitat ==
The natural habitats of I. aranica are temperate grassland, rocky areas, and pastureland.

== Conservation status ==
I. aranica is threatened by habitat loss.

== Description ==
The Aran rock lizard is a medium-sized lizard. Males can reach a total length (including tail) of up to 62 mm (2.4 in), females up to 67 mm (2.6 in). The back has a grayish color, which can sometimes be tinted brown or olive. The back of some males is a glossy metallic green. In the middle of the back sometimes a fine dark line can be visible. A line of dark spots usually runs along both sides of the back and sometimes extends to the tail. In the front half of the body two irregularly rimmed, light longitudinal bands are developed on the border between the back and the flanks. A wide, dark brown to black band runs along each flank from the temple to the proximal portion of the tail. The underside is white, but can be faintly bluish or greenish depending on the light.

== Sources ==
- Arribas, Oscar J. (1993). "Estatus específico para Lacerta (Archaeolacerta) monticola bonnali Lantz, 1927 (Reptilia, Lacertidae) ". Boletin de la Siciedad Española de Historia Natural (Sec. Biol.) 90: 101–112. (Lacerta bonnali aranica, new subspecies). (in Spanish).
- Arribas, Oscar J.; Galán, Pedro (2005). "Reproductive characteristics of the Pyrenean high-mountain lizards: Iberolacerta aranica (Arribas, 1993), I. aurelioi (Arribas, 1994) and I. bonnali (Lantz, 1927)". Animal Biology 55 (2): 163–190.
