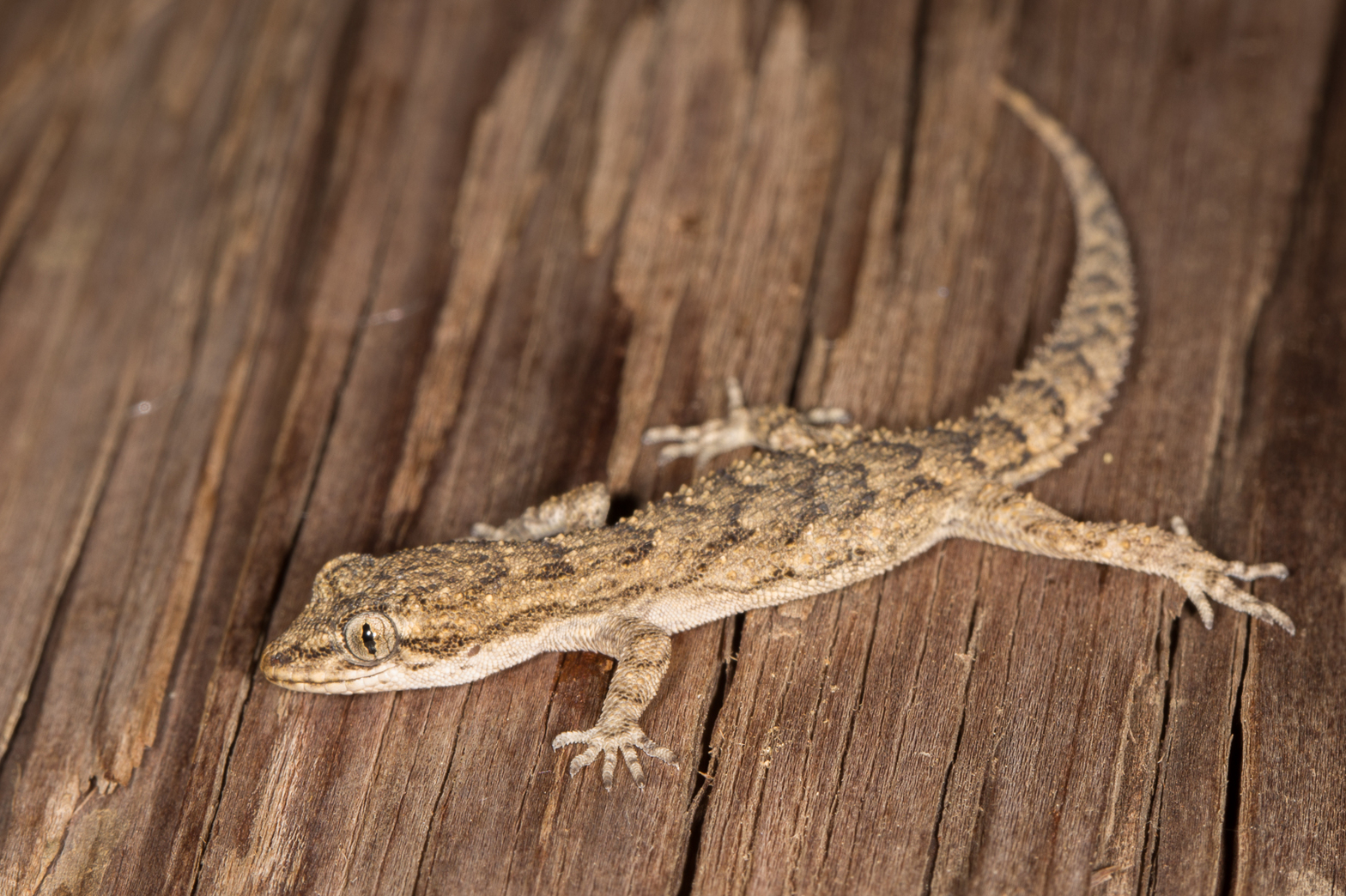

Scientific classification
- Kingdom: Animalia
- Phylum: Chordata
- Class: Reptilia
- Order: Squamata
- Suborder: Gekkota
- Family: Gekkonidae
- Genus: Mediodactylus
- Species: M. orientalis

Binomial name
- Mediodactylus orientalis (Stepánek, 1937)

Synonyms
- Gymnodactylus kotschyi orientalis Cyrtodactylus kotschyi orientalis Tenuidactylys kotschyi orientalis Mediodactylus kotschyi orientalis Cyrtopodion kotschyi orientalis Tenuidactylys kotschyi stepaneki Mediodactylus kotschyi stepaneki Cyrtopodion kotschyi stepaneki

= Mediodactylus orientalis =

Species of lizard

Mediodactylus orientalis, commonly known as the Eastern Mediterranean Thin-toed Gecko, is a species of lizard in the family Gekkonidae. It is found in Israel, Lebanon and Jordan. It is sometimes considered a subspecies of Kotschy's gecko.

The common names of Mediodactylus orientalis (Stepánek, 1937) are Mediterranean thin-toed gecko, Europäischer Nacktfinger and Ägäischer Bogenfinger.

== Reproduction ==
The reproductive system of this species of lizard is oviparous. It produces young by means of eggs which are hatched after they have been laid by the parent.
