= Diurnality =

Behavior characterized by activity during the day and sleeping during the night

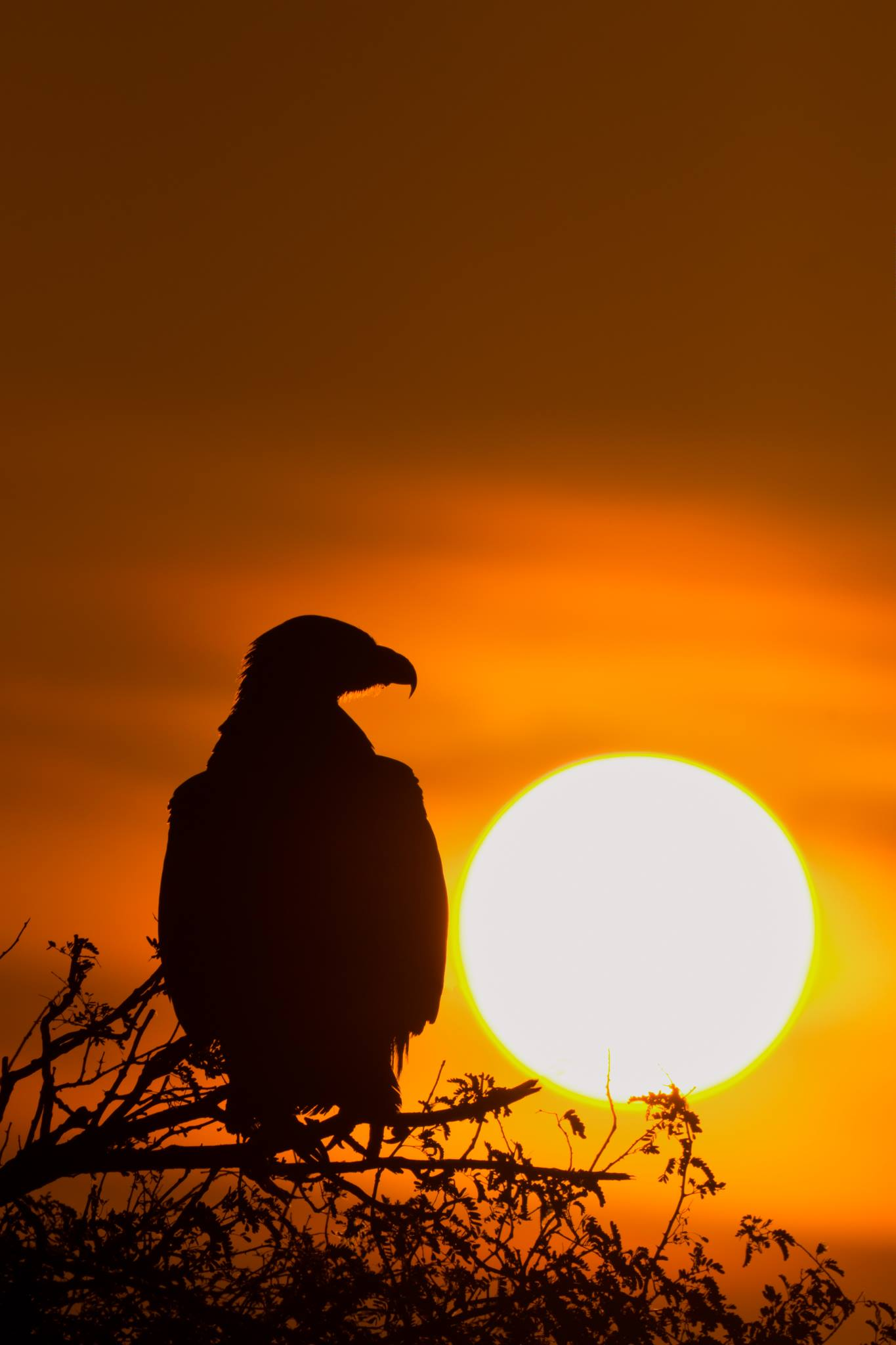
Steppe eagles are diurnal, and hunt during the day.

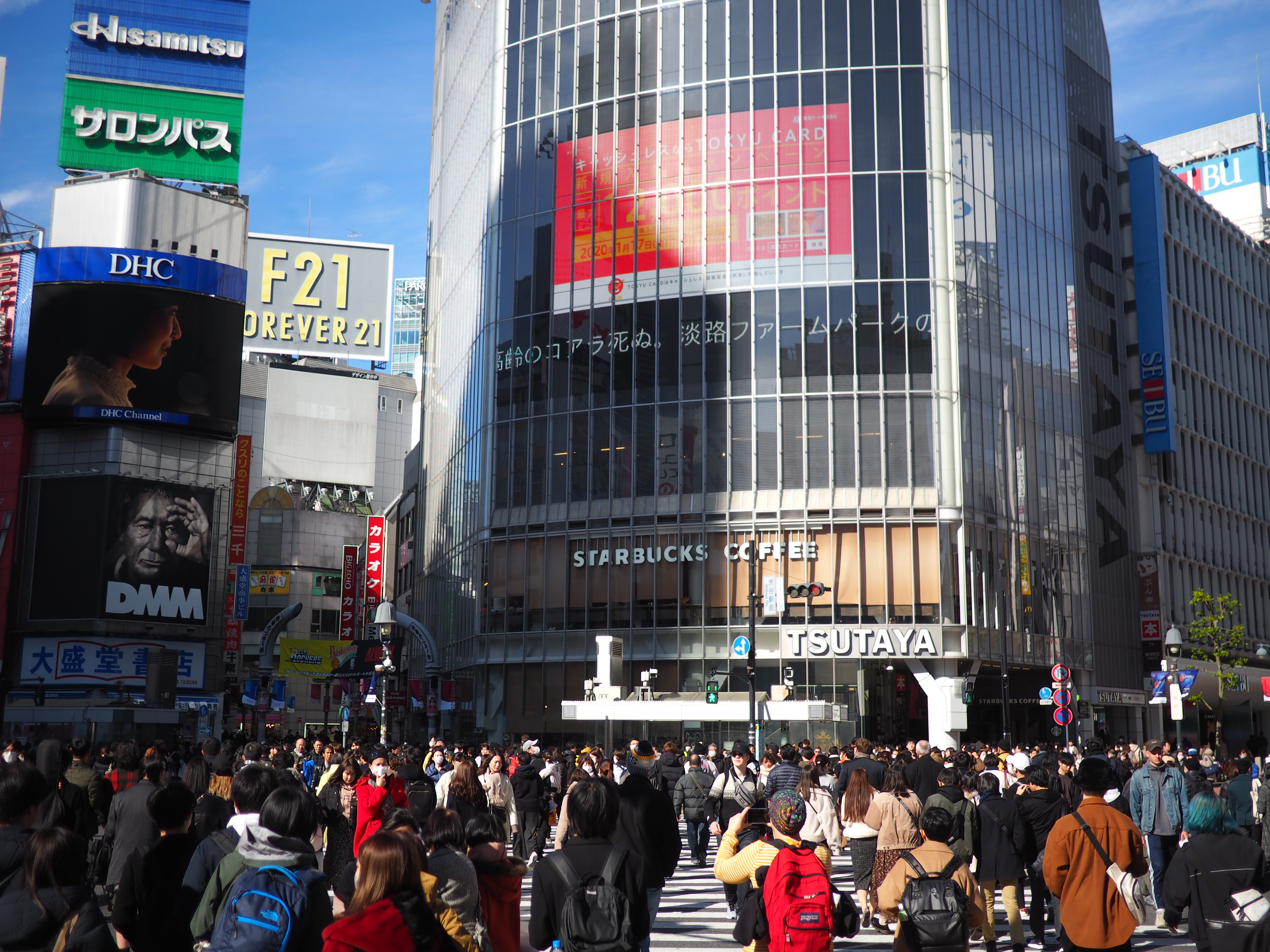
Humans are diurnal, and organize their work and business mainly in the day. (Note: All human societies are organized in a generally diurnal pattern, and humans have a natural tendency to sleep in the night.)

Diurnality is a form of plant and animal behavior characterized by activity during daytime, with a period of sleeping or other inactivity at night. The common adjective used for daytime activity is "diurnal". The timing of activity by an animal depends on a variety of environmental factors such as the temperature, the ability to gather food by sight, the risk of predation, and the time of year. Diurnality is a cycle of activity within a 24-hour period; cyclic activities called circadian rhythms are endogenous cycles not dependent on external cues or environmental factors except for a zeitgeber. Animals active during twilight are crepuscular, those active during the night are nocturnal and animals active at sporadic times during both night and day are cathemeral.

Plants that open their flowers during the daytime are described as diurnal, while those that bloom during nighttime are nocturnal. The timing of flower opening is often related to the time at which preferred pollinators are foraging. For example, sunflowers open during the day to attract bees, whereas the night-blooming cereus opens at night to attract large sphinx moths.

== Animals ==
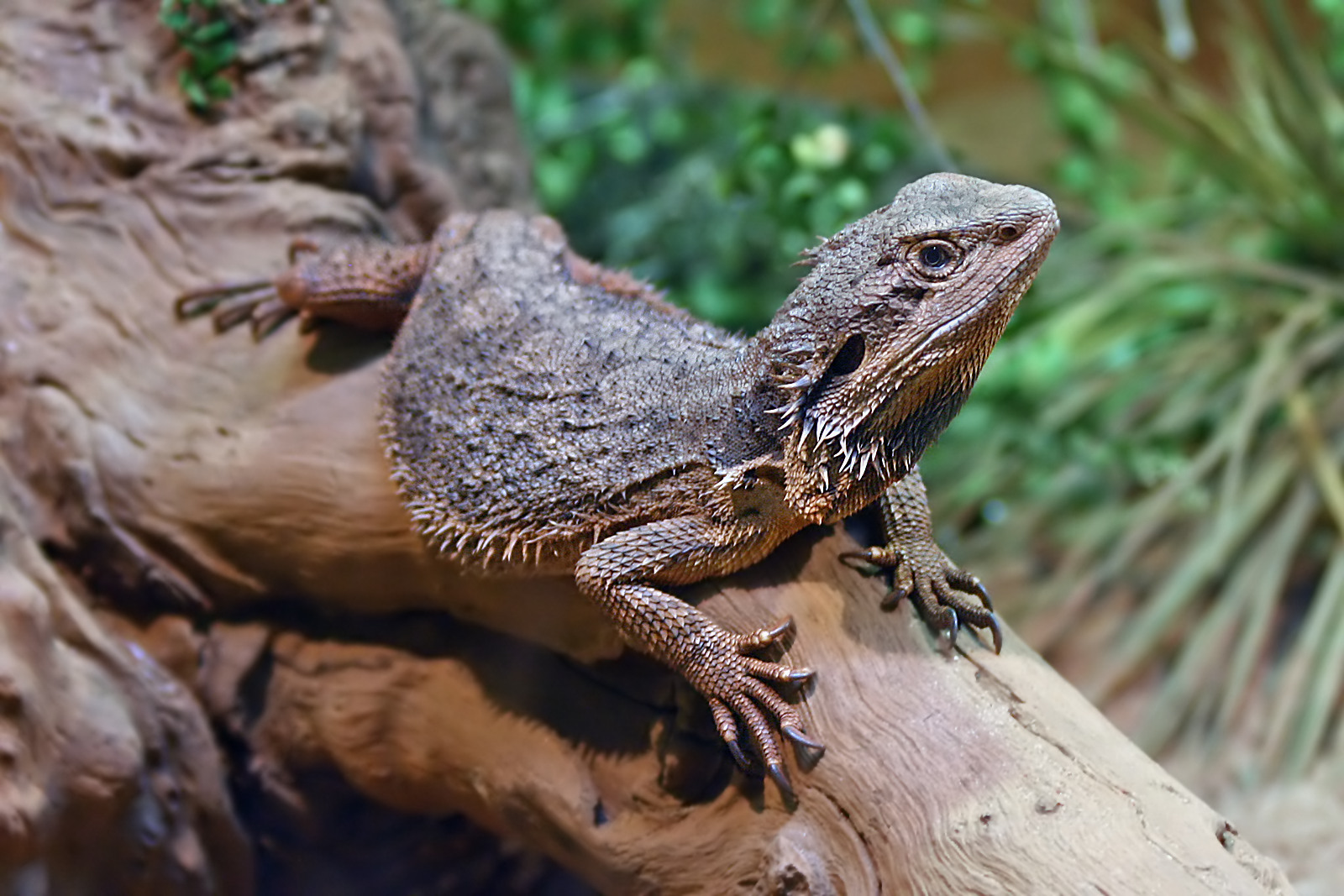
A bearded dragon, a diurnal reptile

Many types of animals are classified as being diurnal, meaning they are active during the day time and inactive or have periods of rest during the night time. Commonly classified diurnal animals include mammals, birds, and reptiles. Most primates are diurnal, including humans. Scientifically classifying diurnality within animals can be a challenge, apart from the obvious increased activity levels during the day time light.

=== Evolution of diurnality ===
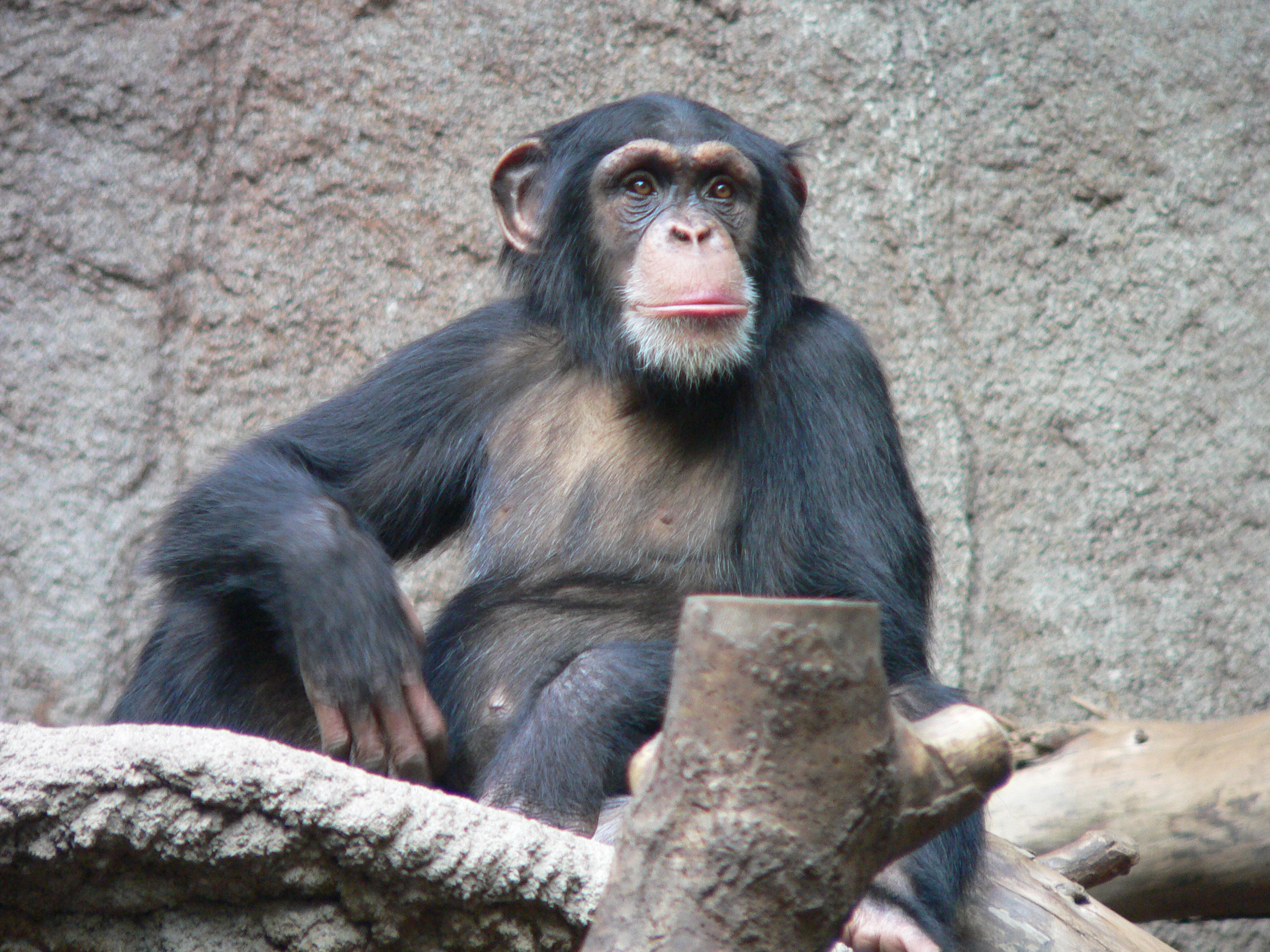
A chimpanzee, a diurnal simian

Initially, most animals were diurnal, but adaptations have allowed some animals to become nocturnal, contributing to the success of many, especially mammals. This evolutionary movement to nocturnality allowed them to better avoid predators and gain resources with less competition from other animals. This did come with some adaptations that mammals live with today. Vision has been one of the most greatly affected senses from switching back and forth from diurnality to nocturnality, and this can be seen using biological and physiological analysis of rod nuclei from primate eyes. This includes losing two of four cone opsins that assists in colour vision, making many mammals dichromats. When early primates converted back to diurnality, better vision that included trichromatic colour vision became very advantageous, making diurnality and colour vision adaptive traits of simiiformes, such as humans. Studies using chromatin distribution analysis of rod nuclei from different simian eyes found that transitions between diurnality and nocturnality occurred several times within primate lineages, with switching to diurnality being the most common transitions.

Still today, diurnality seems to be reappearing in many lineages of other animals, including small rodent mammals like the Nile grass rat and golden mantle squirrel and reptiles. More specifically, geckos, which were thought to be naturally nocturnal have shown many transitions to diurnality, with about 430 species of geckos now showing diurnal activity. With so many diurnal species recorded, comparative analysis studies using newer lineages of gecko species have been done to study the evolution of diurnality. With about 20 transitions counted for the gecko lineages, it shows the significance of diurnality. Strong environmental influences like climate change, predation risk, and competition for resources are all contributing factors. Using the example of geckos, it is thought that species like Mediodactylus amictopholis that live at higher altitudes have switched to diurnality to help gain more heat through the day, and therefore conserve more energy, especially in colder seasons.

=== Light ===
Light is one of the most defining environmental factors that determines an animal's activity pattern. Photoperiod or a light dark cycle is determined by the geographical location, with day time being associated with much ambient light, and night time being associated with little ambient light. Light is one of the strongest influences of the suprachiasmatic nucleus (SCN) which is part of the hypothalamus in the brain that controls the circadian rhythm in most animals. This is what determines whether an animal is diurnal or not. The SCN uses visual information like light to start a cascade of hormones that are released and work on many physiological and behavioural functions.

Light can produce powerful masking effects on an animal's circadian rhythm, meaning that it can "mask" or influence the internal clock, changing the activity patterns of an animal, either temporarily or over the long term if exposed to enough light over a long period of time. Masking can be referred to either as positive masking or negative masking, with it either increasing a diurnal animal's activity or decreasing a nocturnal animal's activity, respectively. This can be depicted when exposing different types of rodents to the same photoperiods. When a diurnal Nile grass rat and nocturnal mouse are exposed to the same photoperiod and light intensity, increased activity occurred within the grass rat (positive masking), and decreased activity within the mouse (negative masking).

Even small amounts of environmental light change have shown to have an effect on the activity of mammals. An observational study done on the activity of nocturnal owl monkeys in the Gran Chaco in South America showed that increased amounts of moonlight at night increased their activity levels through the night which led to a decrease of daytime activity. Meaning that for this species, ambient moonlight is negatively correlated with diurnal activity. This is also connected with the foraging behaviours of the monkeys, as when there were nights of little to no moonlight, it affected the monkey's ability to forage efficiently, so they were forced to be more active in the day to find food.

=== Other environmental influences ===
Diurnality has shown to be an evolutionary trait in many animal species, with diurnality mostly reappearing in many lineages. Other environmental factors like ambient temperature, food availability, and predation risk can all influence whether an animal will evolve to be diurnal, or if their effects are strong enough, then mask over their circadian rhythm, changing their activity patterns to becoming diurnal. All three factors often involve one another, and animals need to be able to find a balance between them if they are to survive and thrive.

Ambient temperature has been shown to affect and even convert nocturnal animals to diurnality as it is a way for them to conserve metabolic energy. Nocturnal animals are often energetically challenged due to being most active in the nighttime when ambient temperatures are lower than through the day, and so they lose a lot of energy in the form of body heat. According to the circadian thermo-energetics (CTE) hypothesis, animals that are expending more energy than they are taking in (through food and sleep) will be more active in the light cycle, meaning they will be more active in the day. This has been shown in studies done on small nocturnal mice in a laboratory setting. When they were placed under a combination of enough cold and hunger stress, they converted to diurnality through temporal niche switching, which was expected. Another similar study that involved energetically challenging small mammals showed that diurnality is most beneficial when the animal has a sheltered location to rest in, reducing heat loss. Both studies concluded that nocturnal mammals do change their activity patterns to be more diurnal when energetically stressed (due to heat loss and limited food availability), but only when predation is also limited, meaning the risks of predation are less than the risk of freezing or starving to death.

== Plants ==
Many plants are diurnal or nocturnal in the opening and closing of their flowers. Most angiosperm plants are visited by various insects, so the flower adapts its phenology to the most effective pollinators. For example, the baobab is pollinated by fruit bats and starts blooming in late afternoon; the flowers are dead within twenty-four hours.

== In technology operations ==
Human activities of everyday life that alternate between high and low rates in a diurnal cycle are described as being diurnal. Some businesses have business hours late at night; most do not. Commuters travel at certain times of day. Public transport and maintenance work are scheduled to suit. Red-eye flights are commonplace on certain airline routes. Many websites have more users during the day and fewer at night, or vice versa. Operations planners can use this cycle to plan, for example, maintenance that needs to be done when there are fewer users.

== See also ==
- Diurnal cycle
- Cathemeral
- Chronotype
- Crepuscular
- Crypsis
- Nocturnality
