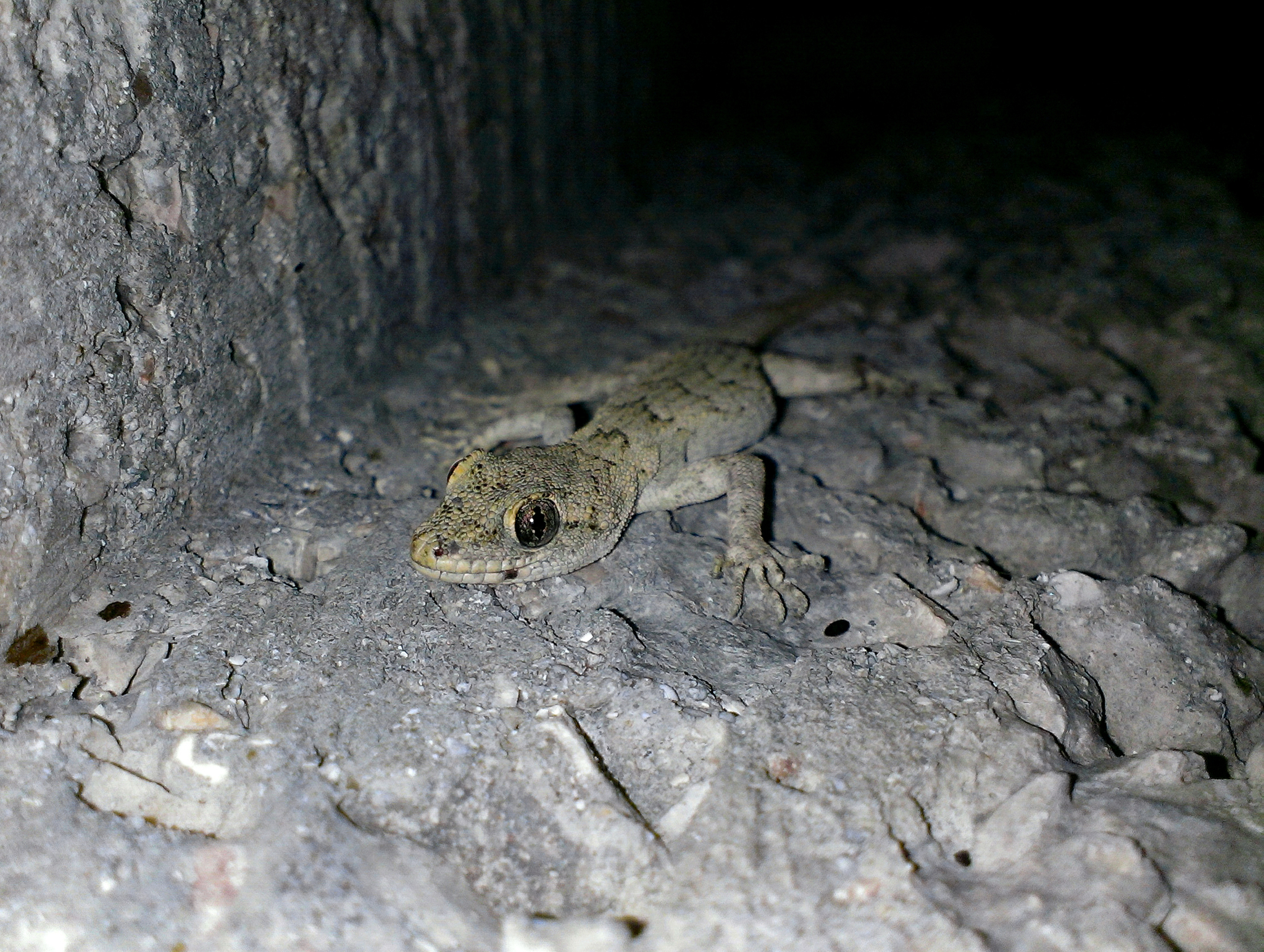

Scientific classification
- Kingdom: Animalia
- Phylum: Chordata
- Class: Reptilia
- Order: Squamata
- Suborder: Gekkota
- Family: Gekkonidae
- Genus: Mediodactylus
- Species: M. danilewskii

Binomial name
- Mediodactylus danilewskii (Strauch, 1887)

Synonyms
- Gymnodactylus danilewskii Gymnodactylus kotschyi bureschi Gymnodactylus kotschyi steindachneri Gymnodactylus kotschyi lycaonicus Cyrtodactylus kotschyi lycaonicus Cyrtodactylus kotschyi bureschi Tenuidactylys kotschyi danilewskii Mediodactylus kotschyi danilewskii Cyrtopodion kotschyi danilewskii

= Mediterranean thin-toed gecko =

Species of lizard

The Mediterranean thin-toed gecko (Mediodactylus danilewskii) is a species of lizard in the family Gekkonidae. It is found in Bulgaria, Ukraine, Turkey, and Greece. Isolated populations were also spotted in Bucharest. It is sometimes considered a subspecies of Kotschy's gecko.
