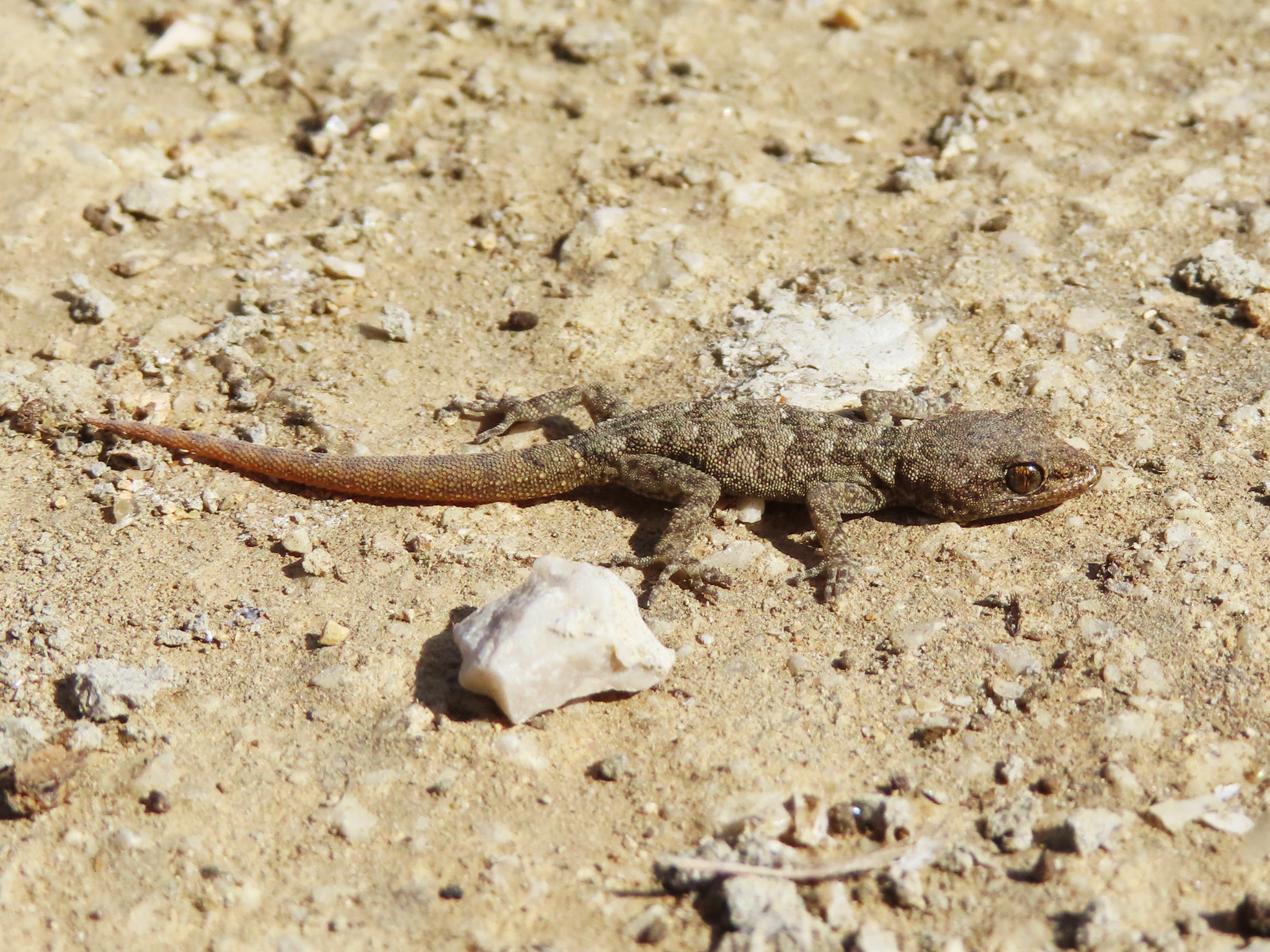

Conservation status
- Least Concern (IUCN 3.1)

Scientific classification
- Kingdom: Animalia
- Phylum: Chordata
- Class: Reptilia
- Order: Squamata
- Suborder: Gekkota
- Family: Gekkonidae
- Genus: Mediodactylus
- Species: M. oertzeni

Binomial name
- Mediodactylus oertzeni (Boettger, 1888)

Synonyms
- Gymnodactylus oertzeni Gymnodactylus kotschyi unicolor Gymnodactylus kotschyi oertzeni Cyrtodactylus oertzeni Cyrtodactylus kotschyi oertzeni Tenuidactylys kotschyi oertzeni Mediodactylus kotschyi oertzeni Cyrtopodion kotschyi oertzeni

= Mediodactylus oertzeni =

Species of lizard

Mediodactylus oertzeni is a species of lizard in the family Gekkonidae. It is endemic to the Dodecanese Islands in Greece. It used to be considered a subspecies of Kotschy's gecko.
