= Mediodactylus spinicauda =

Conservation status
- Least Concern (IUCN 3.1)

Scientific classification
- Kingdom: Animalia
- Phylum: Chordata
- Class: Reptilia
- Order: Squamata
- Suborder: Gekkota
- Family: Gekkonidae
- Genus: Mediodactylus
- Species: M. spinicauda

Binomial name
- Mediodactylus spinicauda (Strauch, 1887)
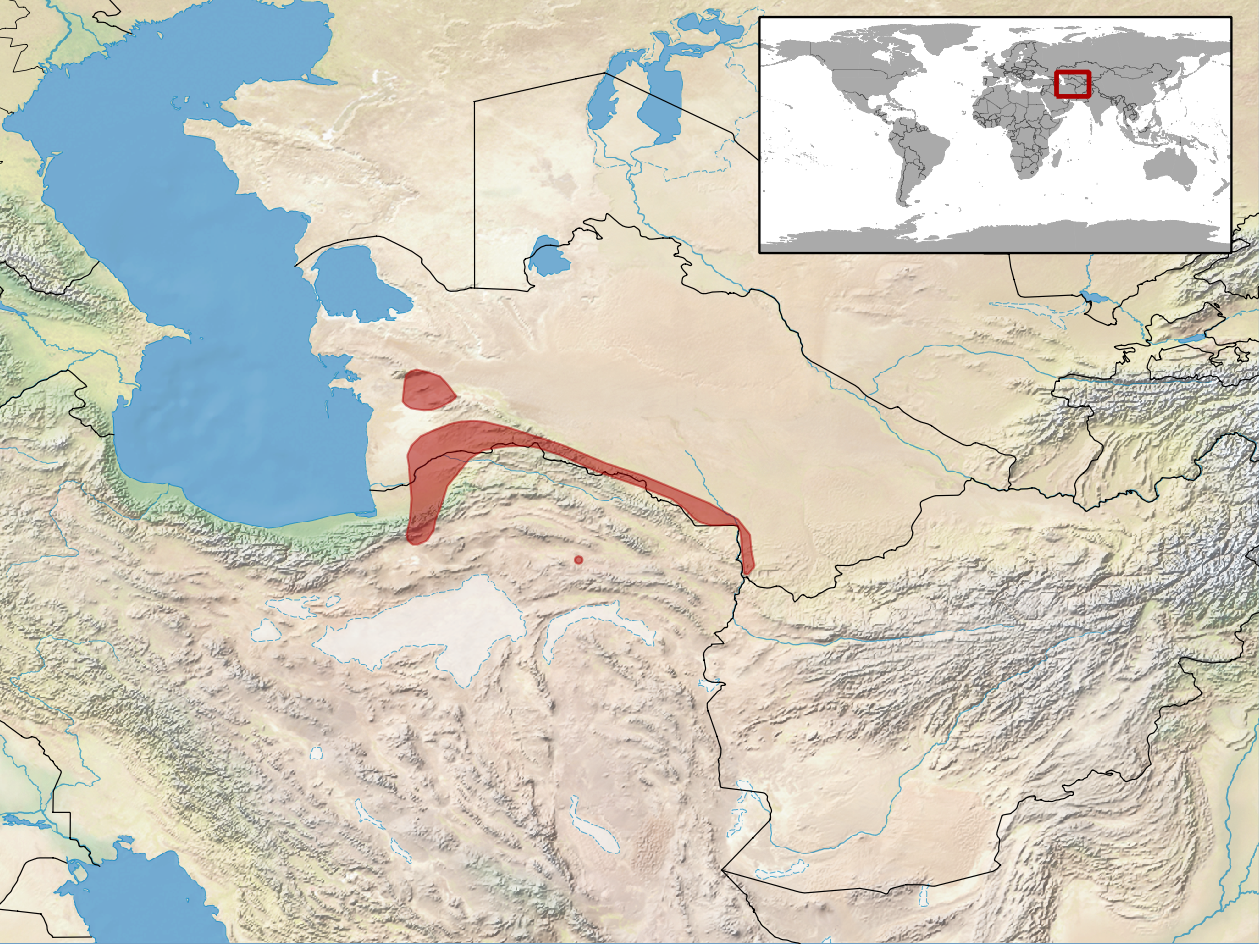

Synonyms
- Alsophylax spinicauda Gymnodactylus spinicauda Tenuidactylus spinicauda Cyrtopodion spinicauda Mediodactylus spinicaudus Cyrtopodion spinicaudus Cyrtopodion spinicaudum

Species of lizard

Mediodactylus spinicauda, also known as the Kopet Dagh bent-toed gecko or spiny-tailed thin-toed gecko, is a species of lizard in the family Gekkonidae. It is endemic to northeastern Iran and southern Turkmenistan. It can be found in rocky areas. shrubland, and grassland hiding in rock crevices and under stones. It is nocturnal.
