= Mediodactylus sagittifer =

Conservation status
- Data Deficient (IUCN 3.1)

Scientific classification
- Kingdom: Animalia
- Phylum: Chordata
- Class: Reptilia
- Order: Squamata
- Suborder: Gekkota
- Family: Gekkonidae
- Genus: Mediodactylus
- Species: M. sagittifer

Binomial name
- Mediodactylus sagittifer (Nikolsky, 1900)

Synonyms
- Gymnodactylus sagittifer Cyrtodactylus saggitifer Tenuidactylus sagittifer Cyrtopodion sagittifer Cyrtopodion sagittiferum Cyrtopodion dehakroense Mediodactylus dehakroensis

Species of lizard

Mediodactylus sagittifer, also known as the Jaz Murian bent-toed gecko or Bampur thin-toed gecko, is a species of lizard in the family Gekkonidae. It is found in southeastern Iran and in Pakistan.
