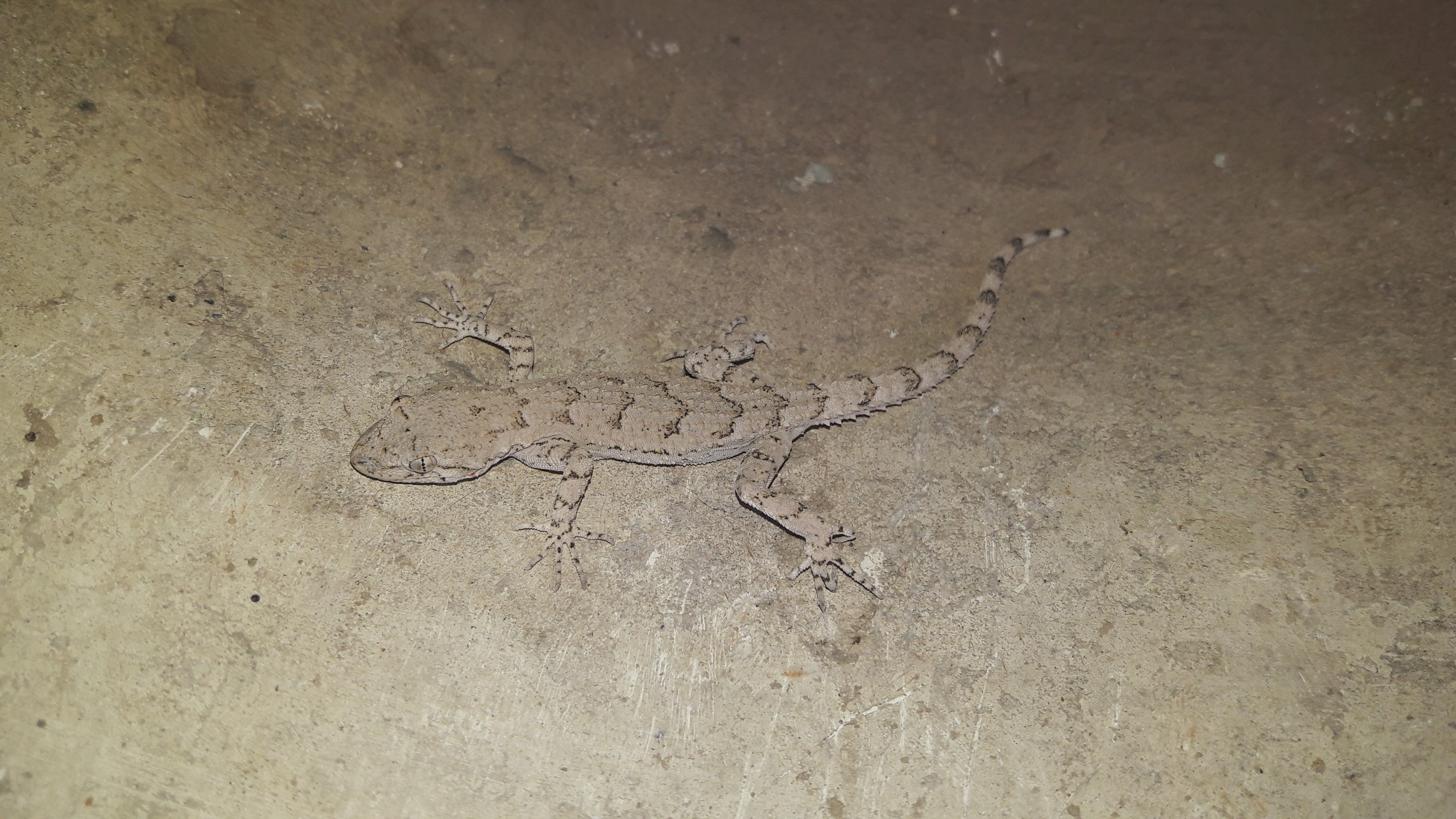
- Mediodactylus russowii

Scientific classification
- Kingdom: Animalia
- Phylum: Chordata
- Class: Reptilia
- Order: Squamata
- Suborder: Gekkota
- Family: Gekkonidae
- Genus: Mediodactylus; Szczerbak and Golubev, 1977

Species
- See text

Synonyms
- Carinatogecko

= Mediodactylus =

Genus of lizards

Mediodactylus is a genus of Gekkonidae (gecko) family. It contains the following species:

== Species ==
Species in alphabetical order by specific name:

- Lebanese thin-toed gecko, Mediodactylus amictopholis Hoofien, 1967
- Iranian gecko, Mediodactylus aspratilis Anderson, 1973
- Barton's thin-toed gecko, Mediodactylus bartoni (Stepánek, 1934)
- Short-limbed bend-toed gecko, Mediodactylus brachykolon Krysko, Rehman & K. Auffenberg, 2007
- Mediterranean thin-toed gecko, Mediodactylus danilewskii (Strauch, 1887)
- Asia Minor thin-toed gecko, Mediodactylus heterocercus (Blanford, 1874)
- Iraqi gecko, Mediodactylus heteropholis Minton, Anderson, & Anderson, 1970
- Ilamian keel-scaled gecko, Mediodactylus ilamensis (Fathinia, Karamiani, Darvishnia, Heidari & Rastegar-Pouyani, 2011)
- Kotschy's gecko, Mediodactylus kotschyi (Steindachner, 1870)
- Mediodactylus narynensis Eremchenko, Zarinenko & Panfilov, 1999
- Mediodactylus oertzeni (Boettger, 1888)
- Eastern Mediterranean Thin-toed Gecko, Mediodactylus orientalis (Stepánek, 1937)
- Mediodactylus russowi (Strauch, 1887)
- Jaz Murian bent-toed gecko, Mediodactylus sagittifer (Nikolsky, 1900)
- Kopet Dagh bent-toed gecko, Mediodactylus spinicauda (Strauch, 1887)
- Mediodactylus stevenandersoni (Torki, 2011)
- Chitral gecko, Mediodactylus walli (Ingoldby, 1922)
