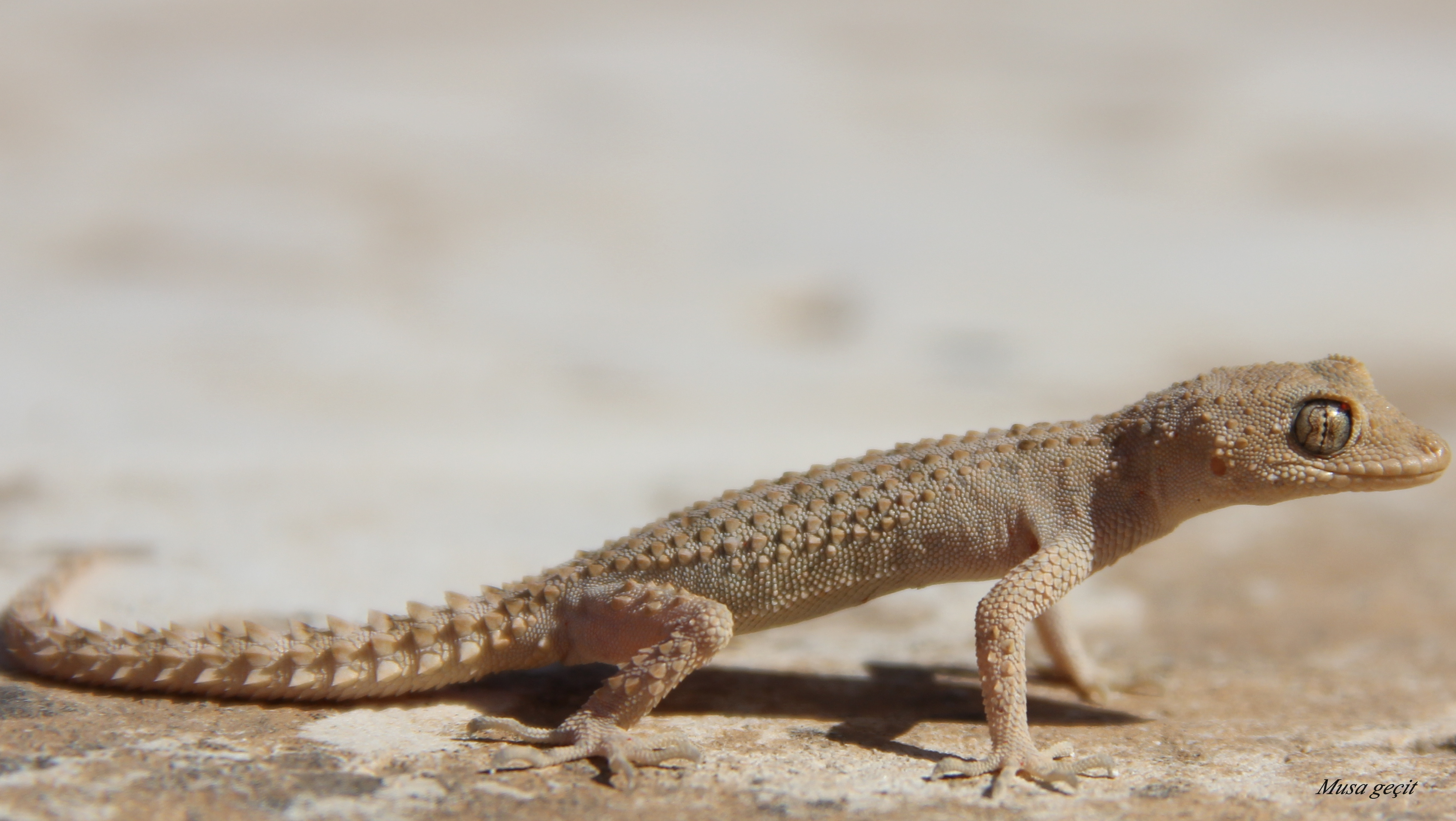

Conservation status
- Least Concern (IUCN 3.1)

Scientific classification
- Kingdom: Animalia
- Phylum: Chordata
- Class: Reptilia
- Order: Squamata
- Suborder: Gekkota
- Family: Gekkonidae
- Genus: Mediodactylus
- Species: M. heterocercus

Binomial name
- Mediodactylus heterocercus (Blanford, 1874)
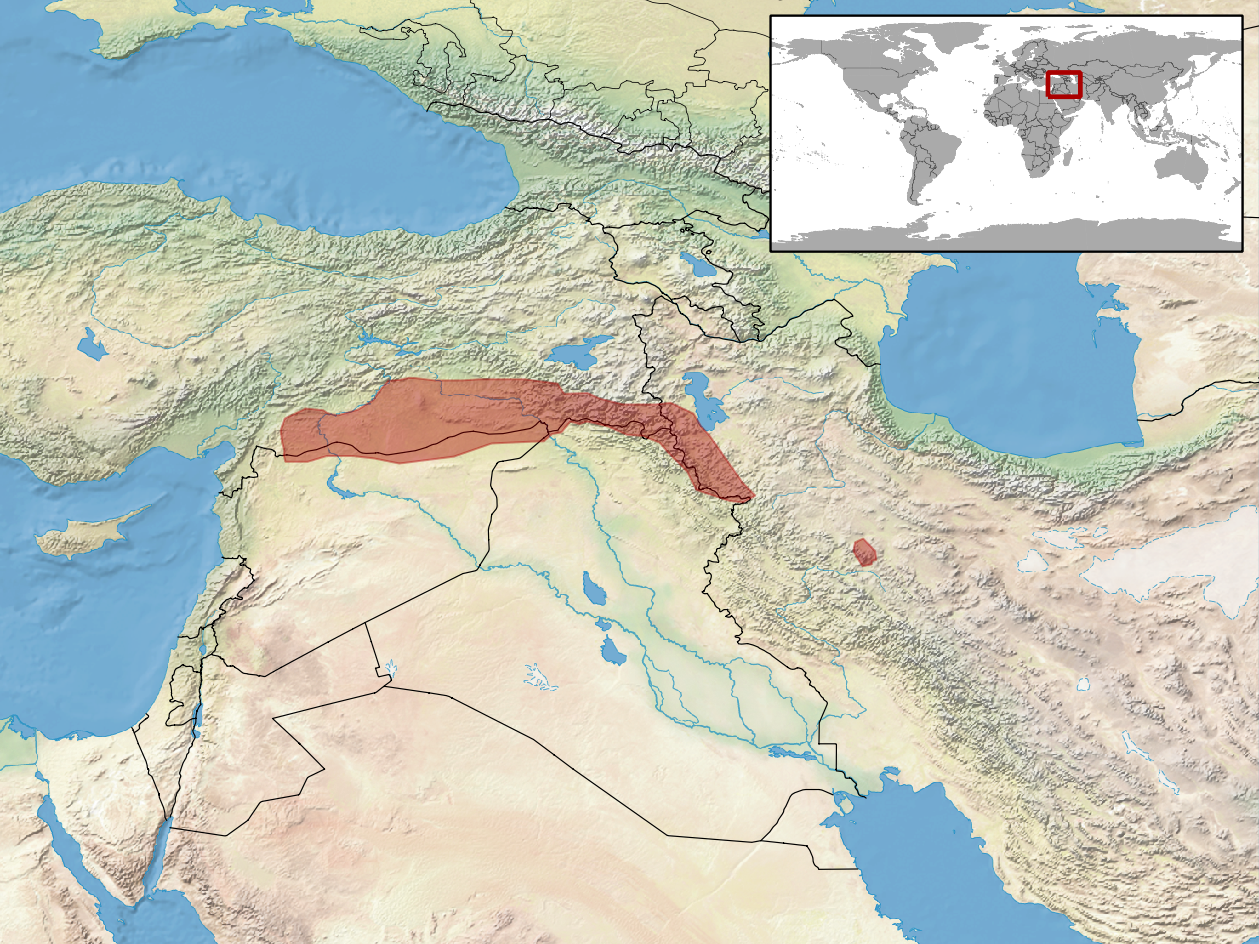

Synonyms
- Gymnodactylus heterocercus Cyrtopodion heterocercus Cyrtopodion heterocercum Tenuidactylus heterocercus

= Asia Minor thin-toed gecko =

Species of lizard

The Asia Minor thin-toed gecko (Mediodactylus heterocercus) is a species of lizard in the family Gekkonidae. It is found in Iran, southeastern Turkey, southern Iraq, and Syria.
