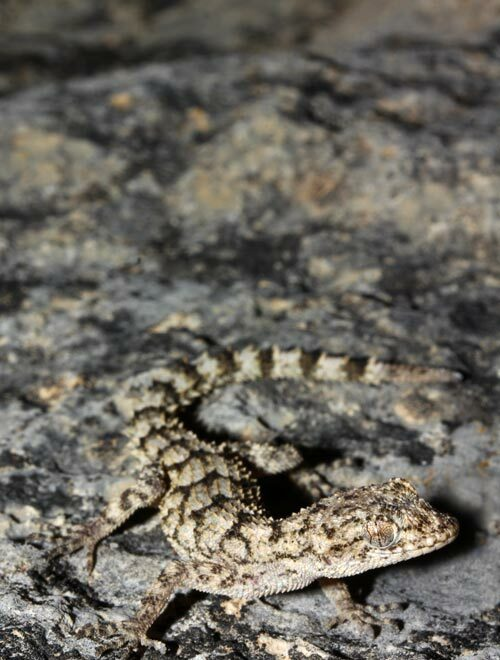

Conservation status
- Data Deficient (IUCN 3.1)

Scientific classification
- Kingdom: Animalia
- Phylum: Chordata
- Class: Reptilia
- Order: Squamata
- Suborder: Gekkota
- Family: Gekkonidae
- Genus: Mediodactylus
- Species: M. aspratilis

Binomial name
- Mediodactylus aspratilis (Anderson, 1973)

Synonyms
- Bunopus aspratilis Carinatogecko aspratilis

= Mediodactylus aspratilis =

Species of lizard

Mediodactylus aspratilis, also known as the Iranian gecko or Iranian keel-scaled gecko, is a species of lizard in the family Gekkonidae. It is endemic to southwestern Iran.
