= Mediodactylus narynensis =

Conservation status
- Least Concern (IUCN 3.1)

Scientific classification
- Kingdom: Animalia
- Phylum: Chordata
- Class: Reptilia
- Order: Squamata
- Suborder: Gekkota
- Family: Gekkonidae
- Genus: Mediodactylus
- Species: M. narynensis

Binomial name
- Mediodactylus narynensis (Jeremčenko, Carinenko, & Panfilov, 1999)

Synonyms
- Cyrtopodion narynensis Cyrtopodion narynense

Species of lizard

Mediodactylus narynensis is a species of lizard in the family Gekkonidae. It is endemic to Kyrgyzstan.
