= Mediodactylus ilamensis =

Scientific classification
- Domain: Eukaryota
- Kingdom: Animalia
- Phylum: Chordata
- Class: Reptilia
- Order: Squamata
- Infraorder: Gekkota
- Family: Gekkonidae
- Genus: Mediodactylus
- Species: M. ilamensis

Binomial name
- Mediodactylus ilamensis (Fathinia, Karamiani, Darvishnia, Heidari & Rastegar-pouyani, 2011)

Synonyms
- Carinatogecko ilamensis

Species of lizard

Mediodactylus ilamensis is a species of lizard in the family Gekkonidae. It is endemic to Iran.
