= Mediodactylus heteropholis =

Conservation status
- Data Deficient (IUCN 3.1)

Scientific classification
- Kingdom: Animalia
- Phylum: Chordata
- Class: Reptilia
- Order: Squamata
- Suborder: Gekkota
- Family: Gekkonidae
- Genus: Mediodactylus
- Species: M. heteropholis

Binomial name
- Mediodactylus heteropholis (Minton, Anderson & Anderson, 1970)

Synonyms
- Tropiocolotes heteropholis Carinatogecko heteropholis Alsophylax persicus

Species of lizard

Mediodactylus heteropholis, also known as the Iraqi gecko or Iraqi keel-scaled gecko, is a species of lizard in the family Gekkonidae. It is endemic to northeastern Iraq and western Iran.
