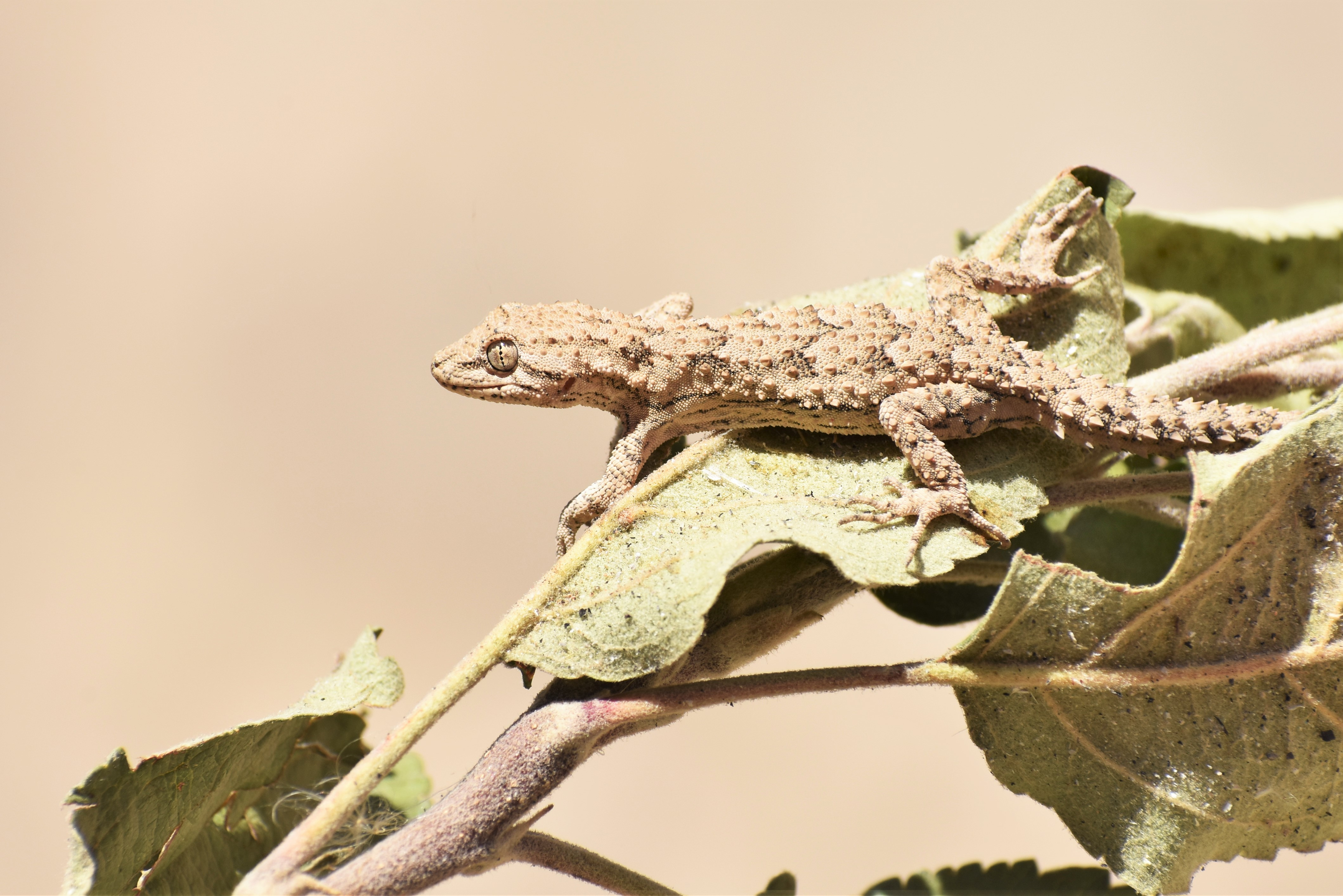

Conservation status
- Least Concern (IUCN 3.1)

Scientific classification
- Kingdom: Animalia
- Phylum: Chordata
- Class: Reptilia
- Order: Squamata
- Suborder: Gekkota
- Family: Gekkonidae
- Genus: Mediodactylus
- Species: M. russowii

Binomial name
- Mediodactylus russowii (Strauch, 1887)

Synonyms
- Gymnodactylus russowii Strauch, 1887; Hemidactylus russowi — Boettger, 1893; Cyrtodactylus russovi Underwood, 1954 (ex errore); Tenuidactylus russowi — Szczerbak & Golubev, 1984; Cyrtopodion russowi — Böhme, 1985; Mediodactylus russowii — Kluge, 1993

= Mediodactylus russowii =

Species of lizard

Mediodactylus russowii, also known commonly as the grey thin-toed gecko, Russow's bent-toed gecko, and the Transcaspian bent-toed gecko, is a species of lizard in the family Gekkonidae. The species is native to Asia. There are two recognized subspecies.

== Etymology ==
The specific name, russowii, is in honor of Estonian naturalist Valerian von Russow (1842–1879).

== Geographic range ==
M. russowii is found from Russia to Turkmenistan, Kazakhstan, northeastern Iran, northwestern China, Uzbekistan, Tajikistan, and Kyrgyzstan.

== Habitat ==
The preferred natural habitats of M. russowii are desert and shrubland, at altitudes from 45 m (148 ft) below sea level to 2,000 m (6,600 ft) above sea level.

== Reproduction ==
M. russowii is oviparous.

== Subspecies ==
The following two subspecies are recognized as being valid, including the nominotypical subspecies.

- Mediodactylus russowii russowii (Strauch, 1887)
- Mediodactylus russowii zarudnyi (Nikolsky, 1900)

Nota bene: A trinomial authority in parentheses indicates that the subspecies was originally described in a genus other than Mediodactylus.

== Gallery ==
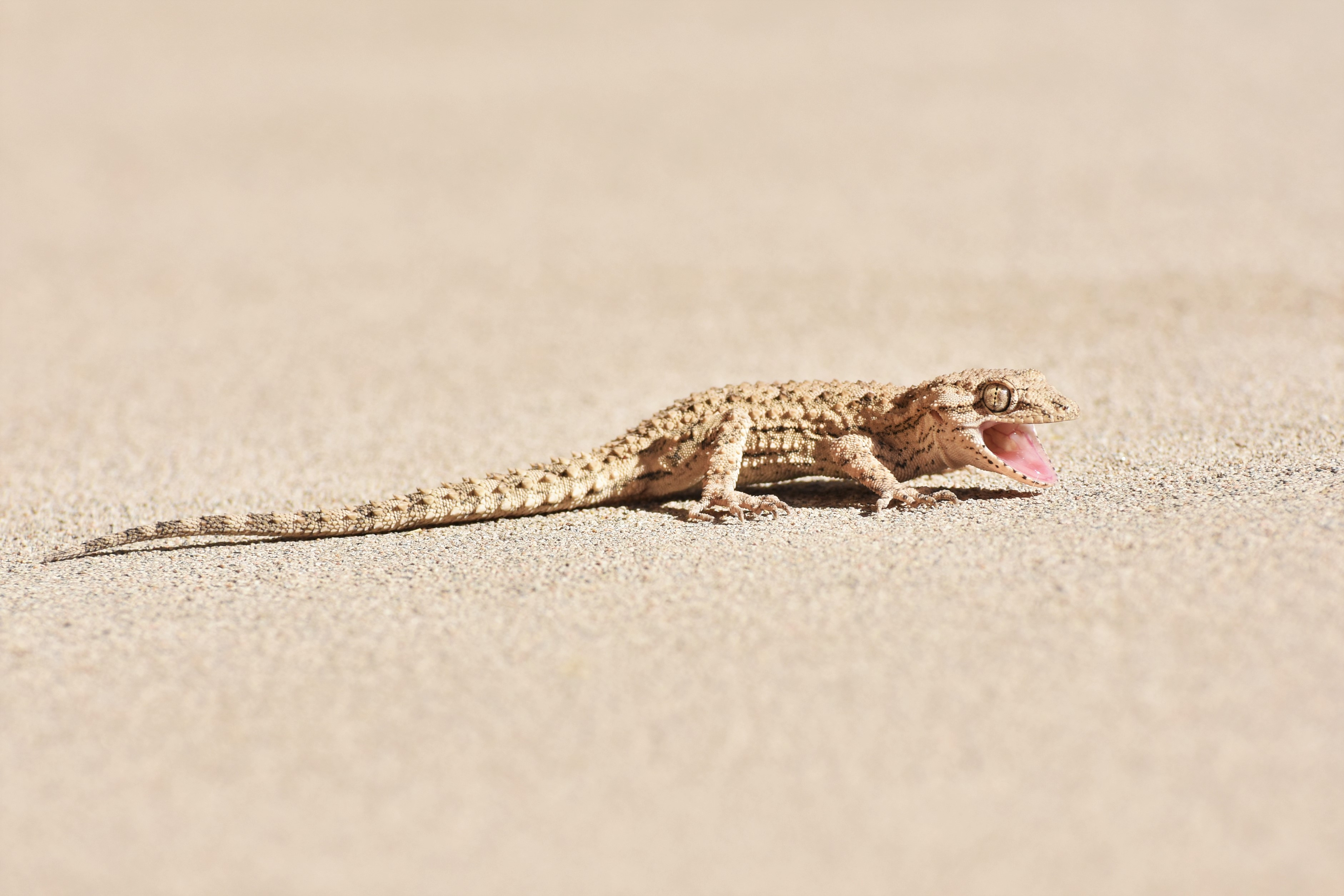
Mediodactylus russowii

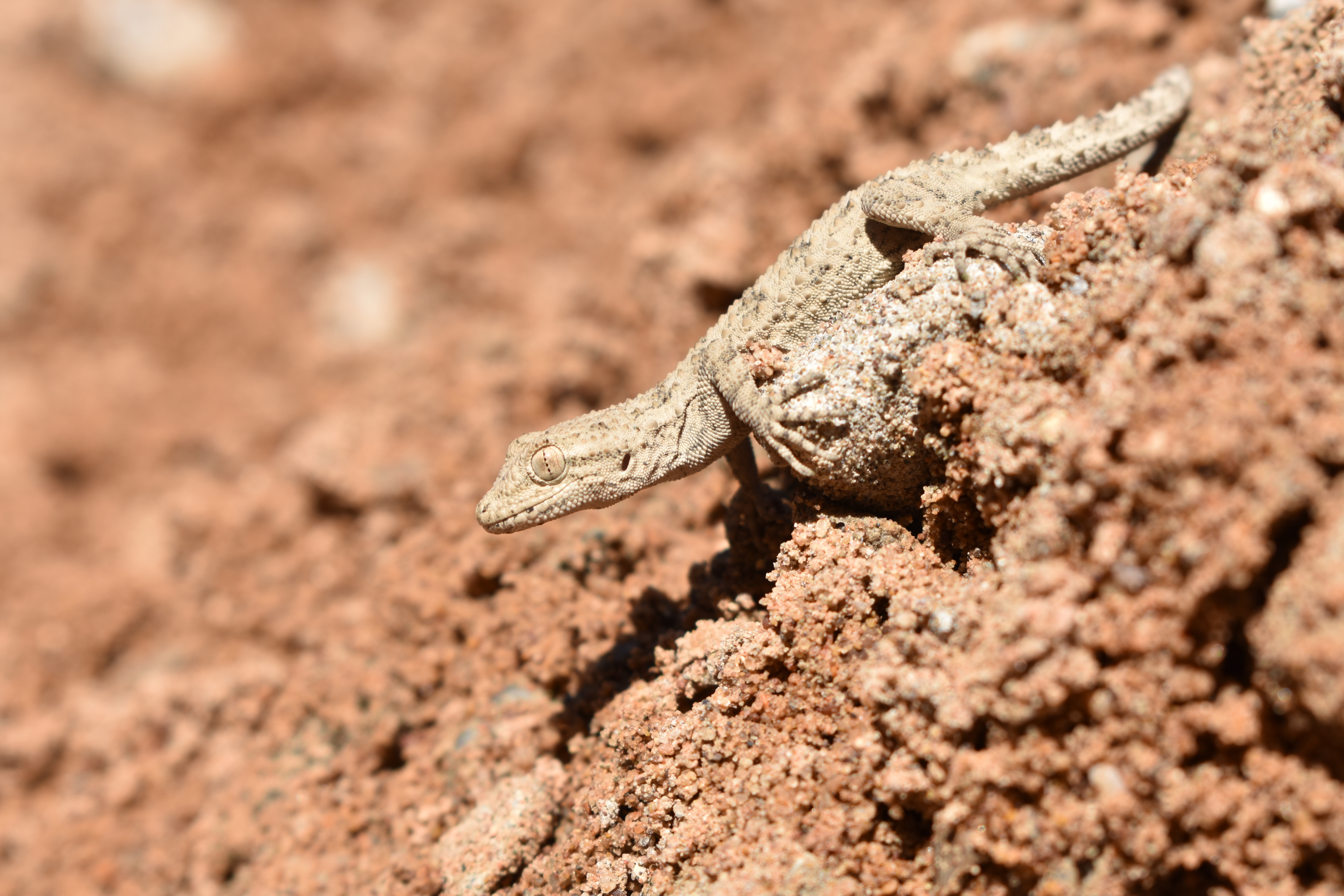
Mediodactylus russowii

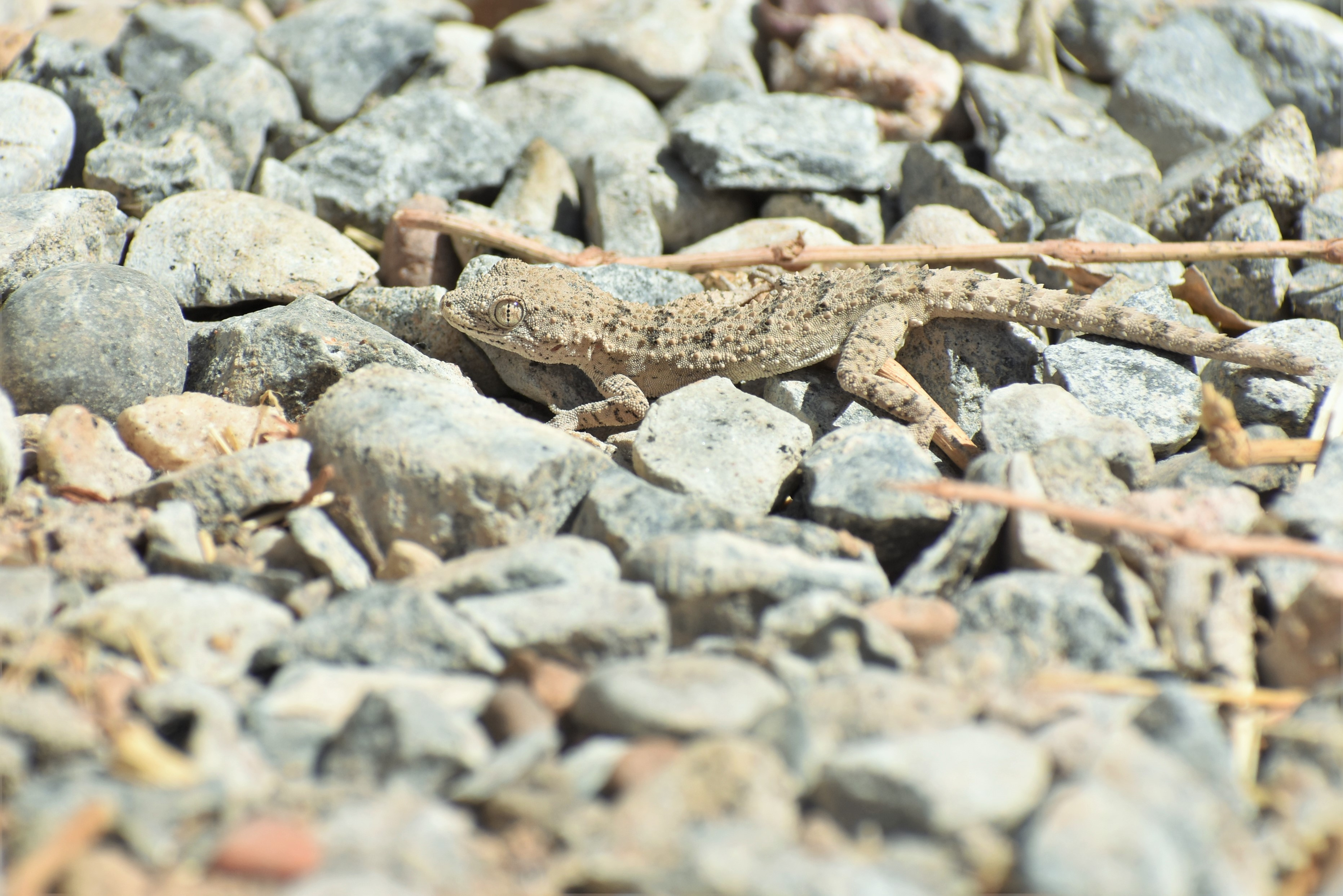
Mediodactylus russowii
