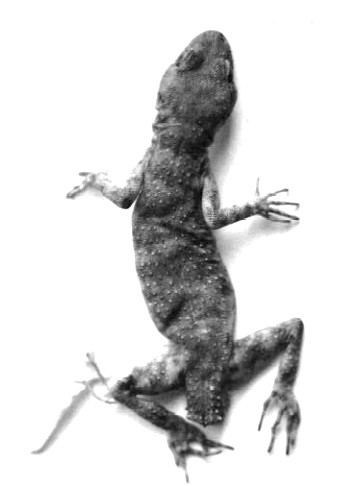

Conservation status
- Least Concern (IUCN 3.1)

Scientific classification
- Kingdom: Animalia
- Phylum: Chordata
- Class: Reptilia
- Order: Squamata
- Suborder: Gekkota
- Family: Gekkonidae
- Genus: Mediodactylus
- Species: M. walli

Binomial name
- Mediodactylus walli (Ingoldby, 1922)
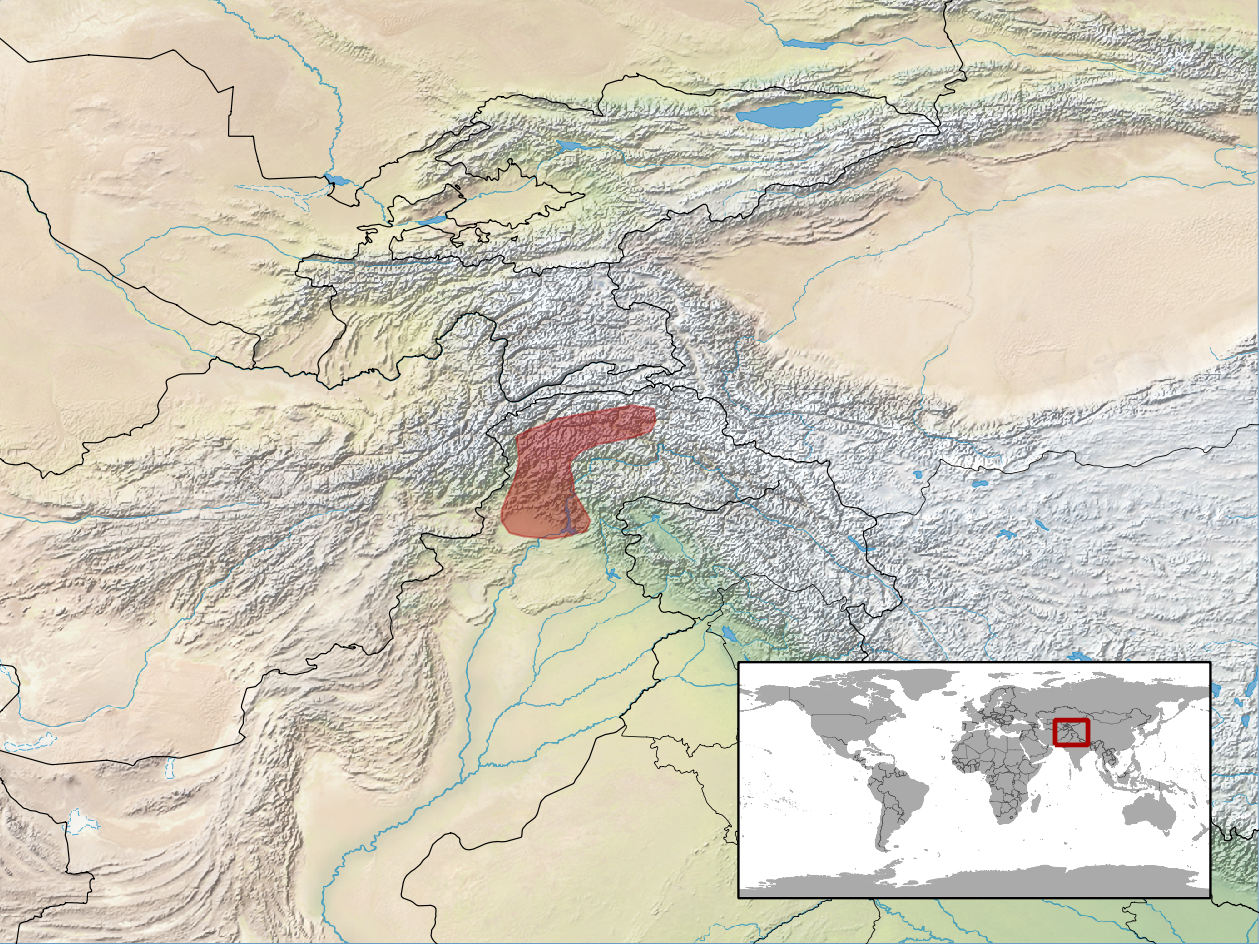

Synonyms
- Gymnodactylus walli Ingoldby, 1922; Cyrtodactylus walli — Kluge, 1993; Gonydactylus walli — Das, 1994; Cyrtopodion walli — Rösler, 2000; Tenuidactylus walli — Khan, 2003; Altiphylax walli — Sindaco & Jeremčenko, 2008; Mediodactylus walli — Bauer et al., 2013

= Chitral gecko =

Species of lizard

The Chitral gecko (Mediodactylus walli), also known commonly as the Chitral bow-foot gecko, is a species of lizard in the family Gekkonidae. The species is endemic to Pakistan.

== Etymology ==
The specific name, walli, is in honor of British herpetologist Frank Wall.

== Geographic range ==
M. walli is found in northwestern Pakistan. The type locality is "Chitral, Northwest Frontier Province, Pakistan".

== Habitat ==
The preferred natural habitats of M. walli are shrubland and rocky areas, at altitudes of 1,500–1,850 m (4,920–6,070 ft).

== Reproduction ==
M. walli is oviparous.
