= Mediodactylus stevenandersoni =

Scientific classification
- Domain: Eukaryota
- Kingdom: Animalia
- Phylum: Chordata
- Class: Reptilia
- Order: Squamata
- Infraorder: Gekkota
- Family: Gekkonidae
- Genus: Mediodactylus
- Species: M. stevenandersoni

Binomial name
- Mediodactylus stevenandersoni (Torki, 2011)

Synonyms
- Carinatogecko stevenandersoni

Species of lizard

Mediodactylus stevenandersoni is a species of lizard in the family Gekkonidae. It is endemic to western Iran.
