= Lebanese thin-toed gecko =

Conservation status
- Endangered (IUCN 3.1)

Scientific classification
- Kingdom: Animalia
- Phylum: Chordata
- Class: Reptilia
- Order: Squamata
- Suborder: Gekkota
- Family: Gekkonidae
- Genus: Mediodactylus
- Species: M. amictopholis

Binomial name
- Mediodactylus amictopholis Hoofien, 1967
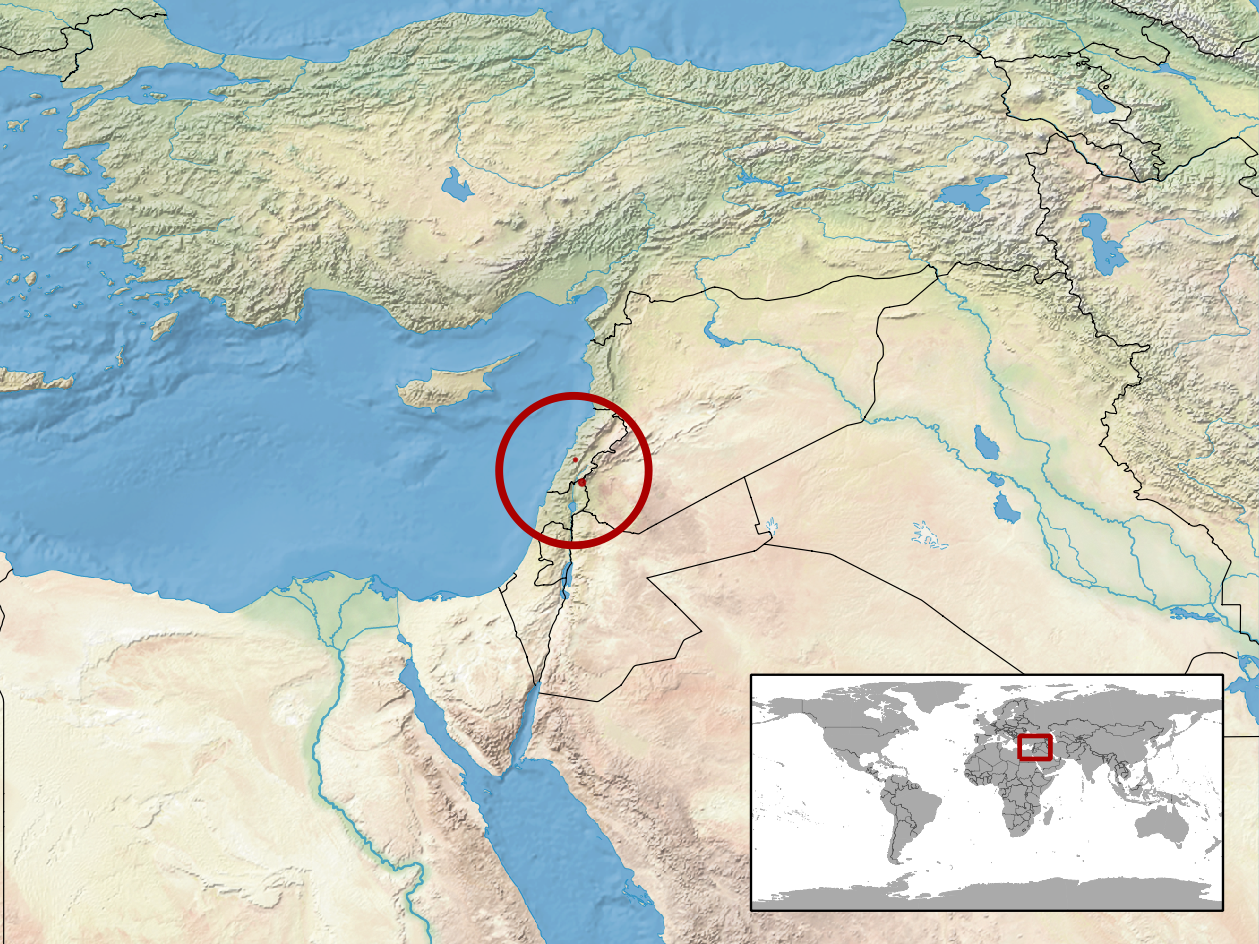

Synonyms
- Cyrtopodion amictopholis

Species of lizard

The Lebanese thin-toed gecko (Mediodactylus amictopholis) is a species of lizard in the family Gekkonidae. It is found in Lebanon, Syria and Israel. Its natural habitat is elevated rocky areas. It is threatened by habitat loss.
