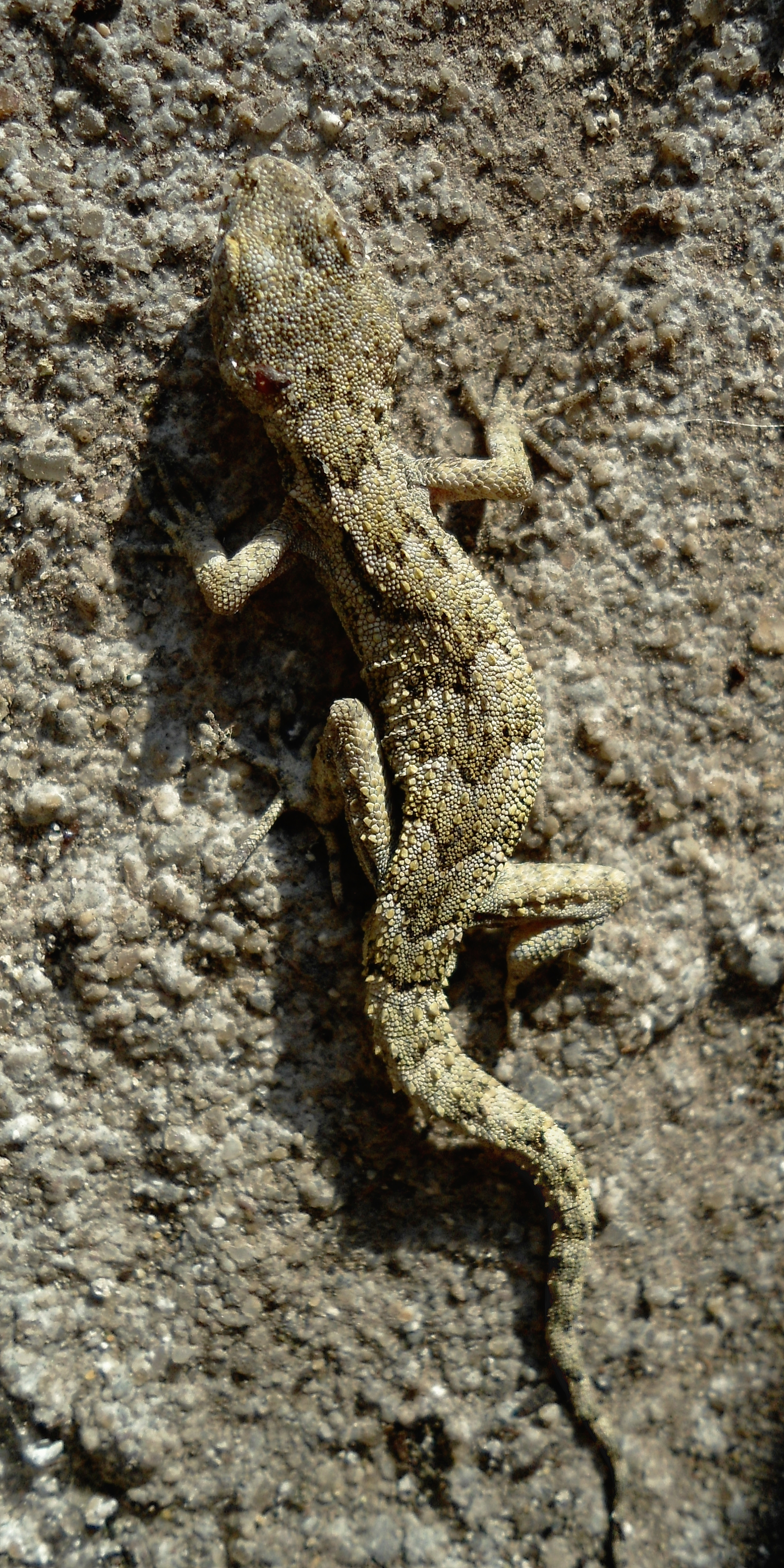

Conservation status
- Least Concern (IUCN 3.1)

Scientific classification
- Kingdom: Animalia
- Phylum: Chordata
- Class: Reptilia
- Order: Squamata
- Suborder: Gekkota
- Family: Gekkonidae
- Genus: Mediodactylus
- Species: M. kotschyi

Binomial name
- Mediodactylus kotschyi (Steindachner, 1870)

Synonyms
- Gymnodactylus kotschyi Steindachner, 1870; Cytrodactylus [sic] kotschyi — Nader & S.Z. Jawdat, 1976; Cyrtodactylus kotschyi — Baran & Gruber, 1982; Cyrtopodion kotschyi — Rösler, 2000; Mediodactylus kotschyi — Szczerbak, 2003

= Kotschy's gecko =

Species of lizard

Kotschy's gecko (Mediodactylus kotschyi) is a species of gecko, a lizard in the family Gekkonidae. The species is native to southeastern Europe and the Middle East. It is named in honour of the Austrian botanist and explorer Theodor Kotschy.

== Description ==
Kotschy's gecko is a slender lizard growing to a length of about 10 cm (4 in) including its tail. Females grow slightly larger than males. The limbs and tail are slim and there are small tubercles on the back and tail. The digits do not have adhesive pads but the toes are relatively long with a kink in the middle. The colour is rather variable and may have a background of yellowish-grey, greyish-brown, dark brown or reddish-black. The dorsal surface is marked with W-shaped transverse bands of darker colour. Like other geckos, the markings remain the same but the overall shade can be darker in cool conditions and paler in the heat of the day. The underparts may be yellowish or orange.

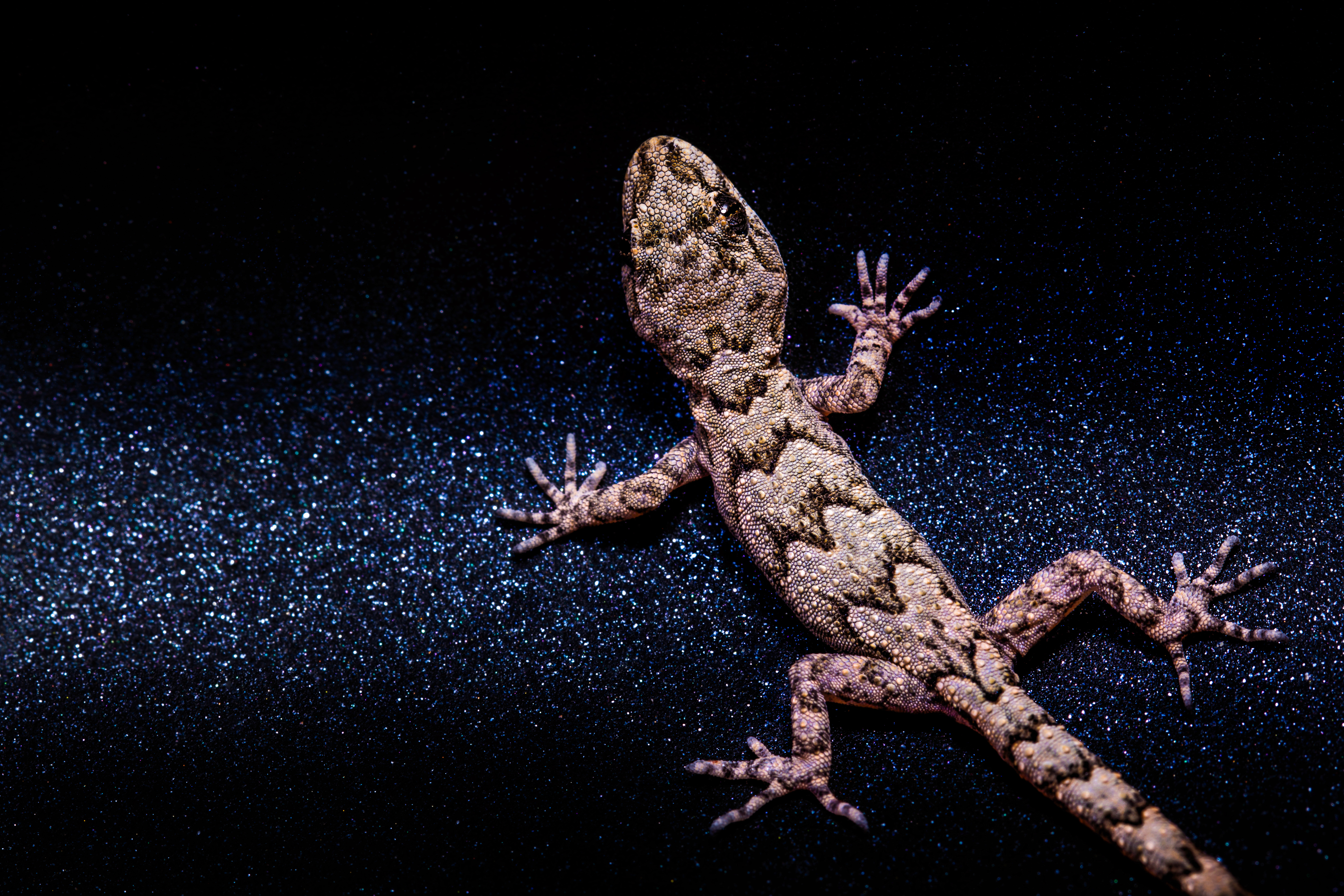
Cyrtopodion kotschyi.

== Distribution and habitat ==
Kotschy's gecko is mostly distributed along the coastal areas of the Eastern Mediterranean Sea and the Black Sea. It is native to Ukraine (Crimean Peninsula), Bulgaria, Serbia, North Macedonia, Albania, Greece, Cyprus, Turkey, Syria, Lebanon, Jordan, Israel and Southern Italy (Apulia).

Its typical habitat is cliffs, dry stony areas, scrub, tree trunks, stone walls, and the external and internal walls of buildings. It is found at elevations of up to 1,700 m (5,577 ft) but is mostly a lowland species.

== Behaviour ==
Kotschy's gecko is mainly nocturnal but at cooler times of year it is often active in the day as well, especially early and late. It climbs very well despite having no adhesive pads, but spends less time on cliffs and climbs less high than the wall lizards (Podarcis) spp., with which it is often found. When disturbed, it retreats into dense undergrowth, hides in crevices among rocks, or clings onto the underside of overhangs. It is infrequently found in buildings. The voice is a repeated high-pitched "chick", and males and females may call to each other during courtship.

== Reproduction ==
The female Kotschky's gecko lays two eggs (occasionally one) under stones or in a crevice and these take eleven to eighteen weeks to hatch into juveniles about 2 cm (0.8 in) long. These offspring become mature in about two years, and Kotschy's gecko has been known to live for nine years in captivity.

== Status ==
Kotschy's gecko is listed by the IUCN as being of "Least Concern". This is because it has a very wide range and is common over much of this range. The population trend is unknown, but it faces no particular threats, although deforestation might be a threat in Israel and Jordan where it is mostly found on tree trunks. It is possible that this might be a species complex, and if so, individual populations might need to be placed in a more threatened category.
